= Hobart =

Capital city of Tasmania, Australia

Hobart nipaluna (Southeast Tasmanian)
- City
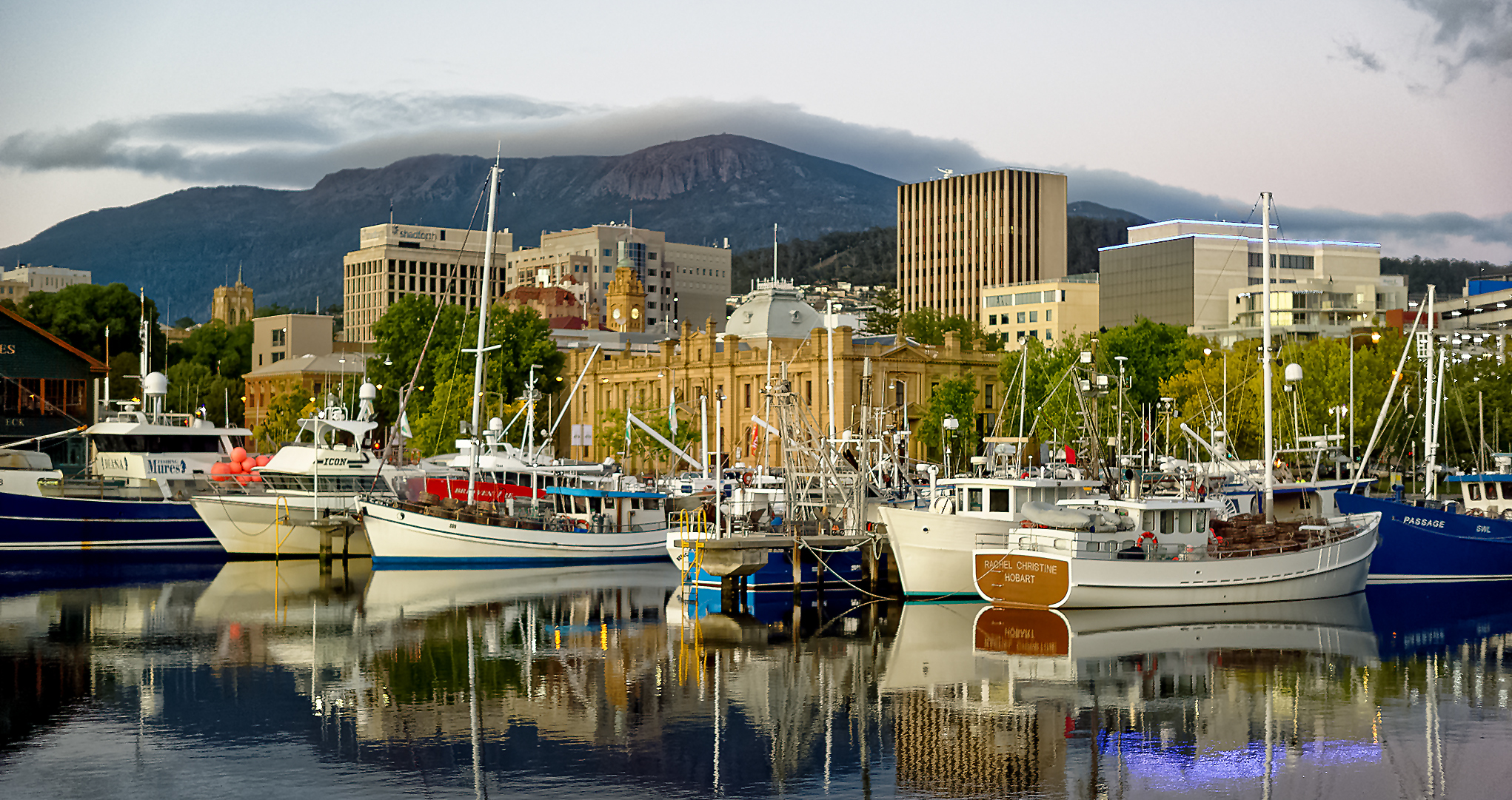
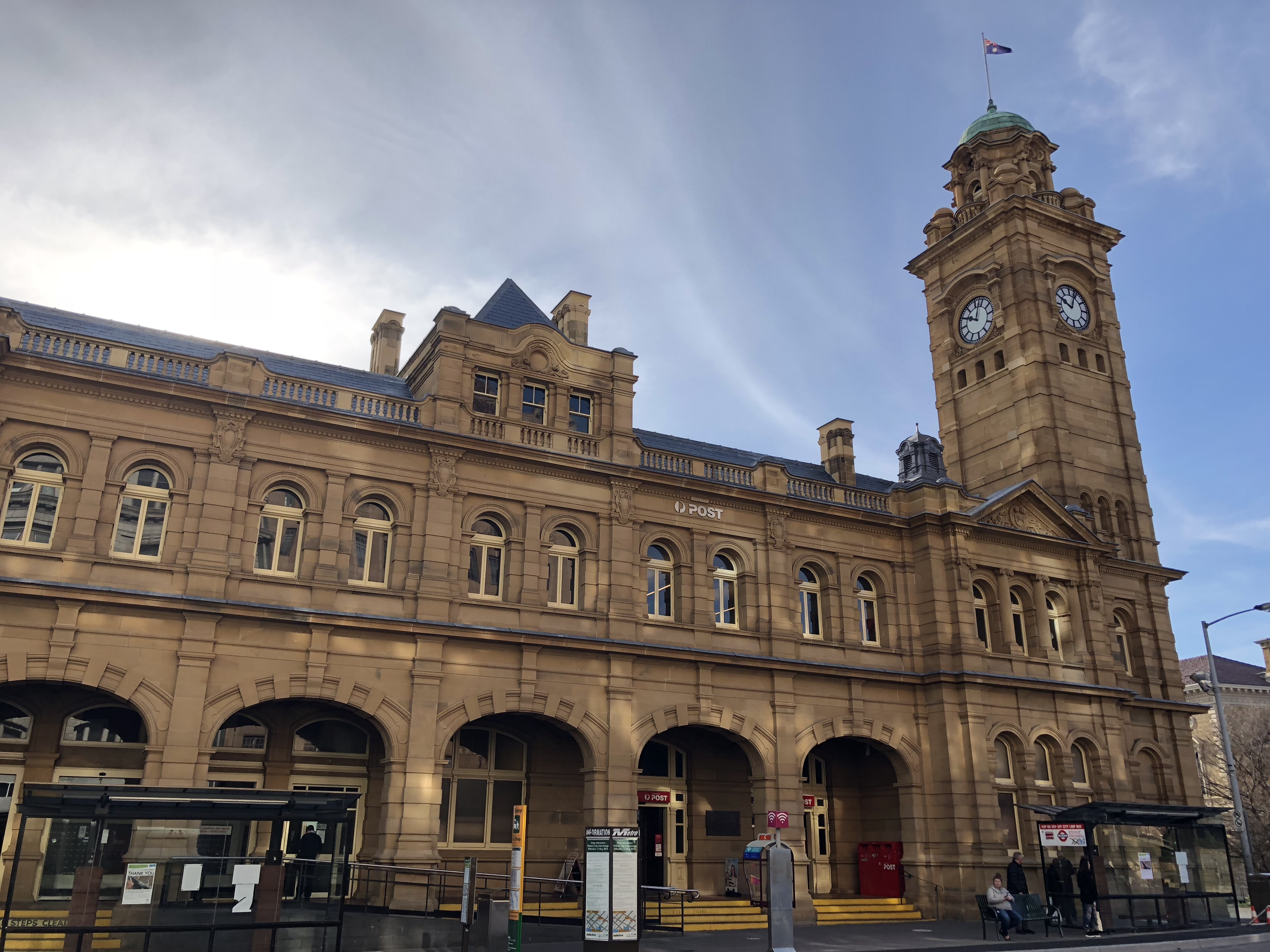
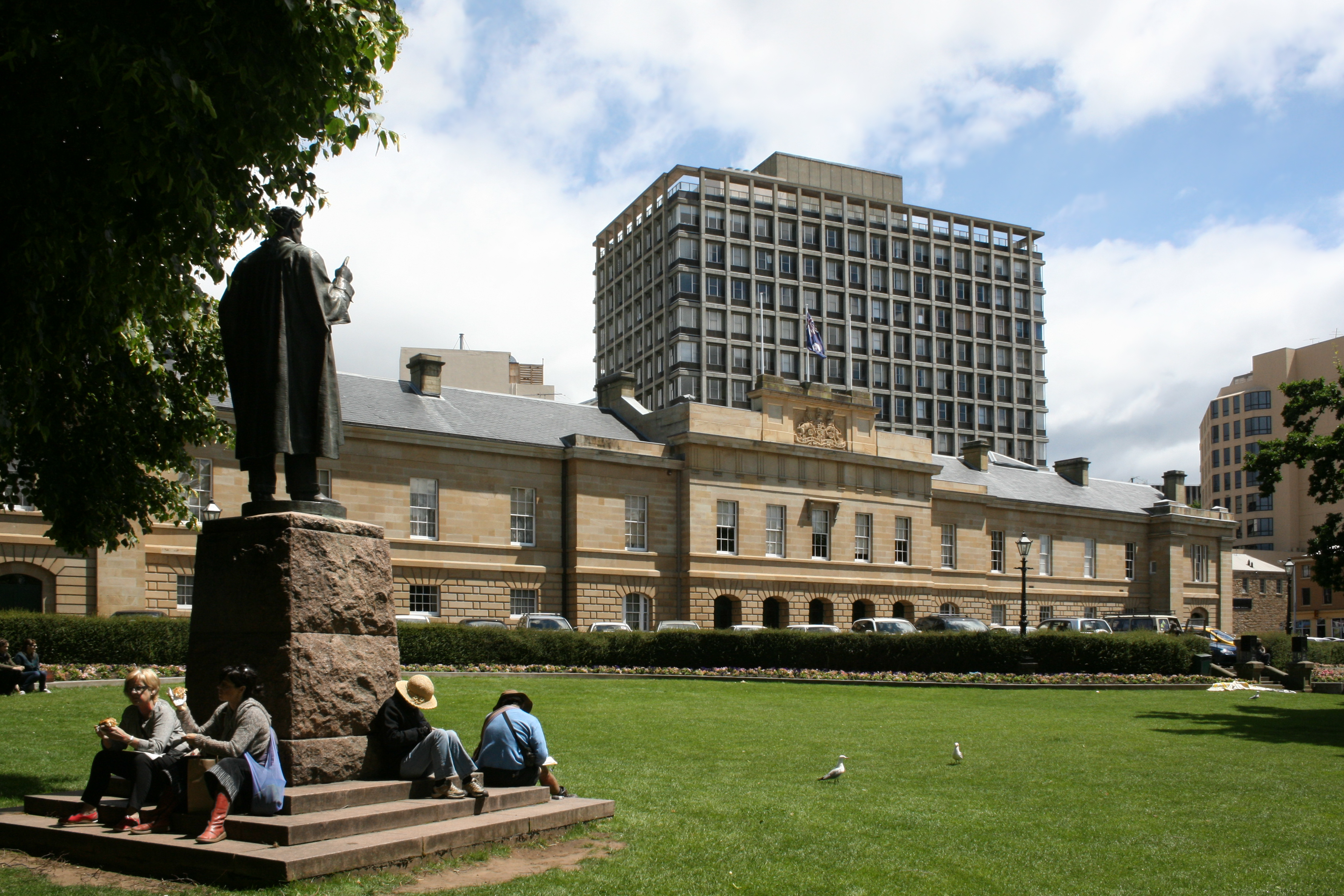
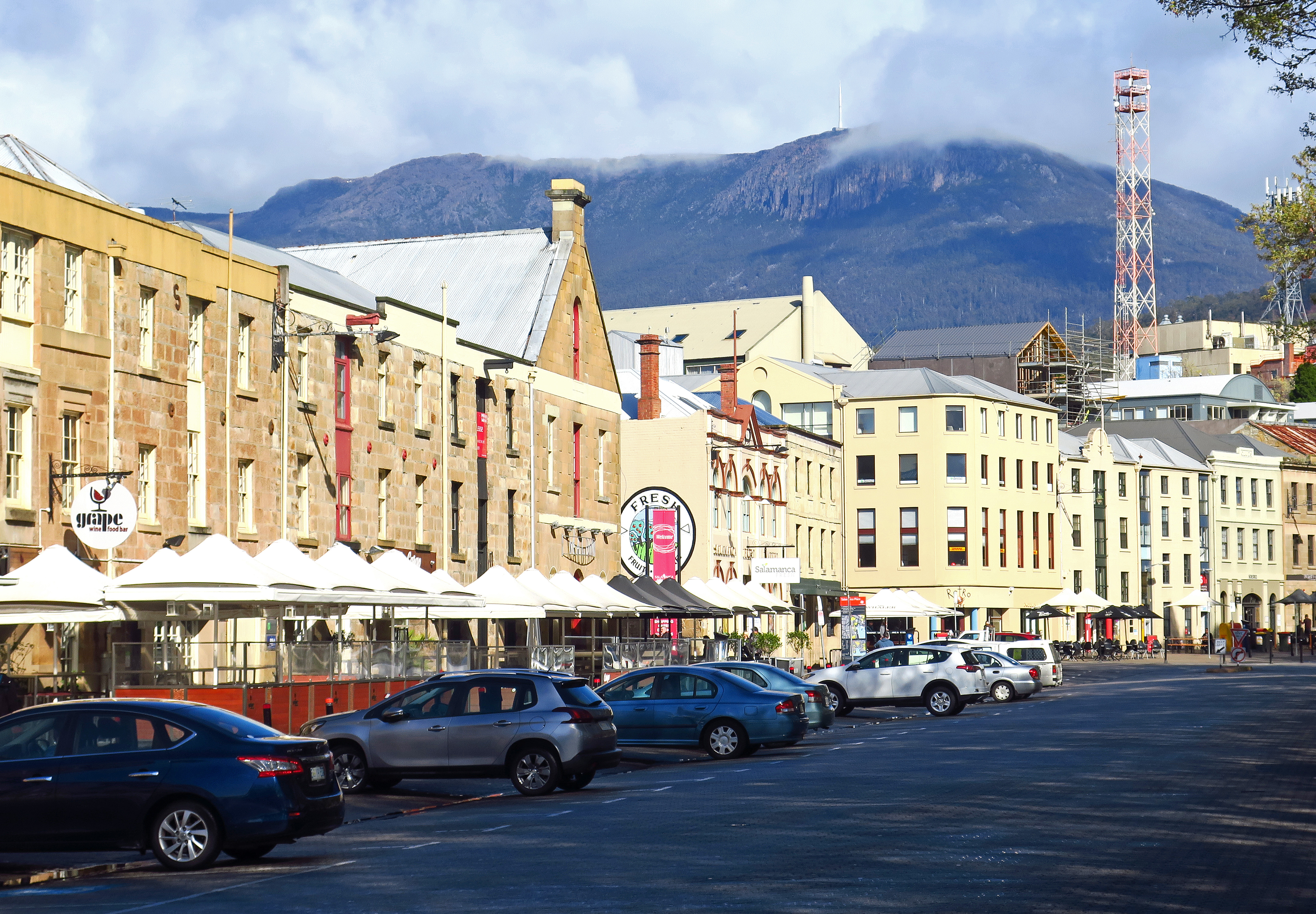
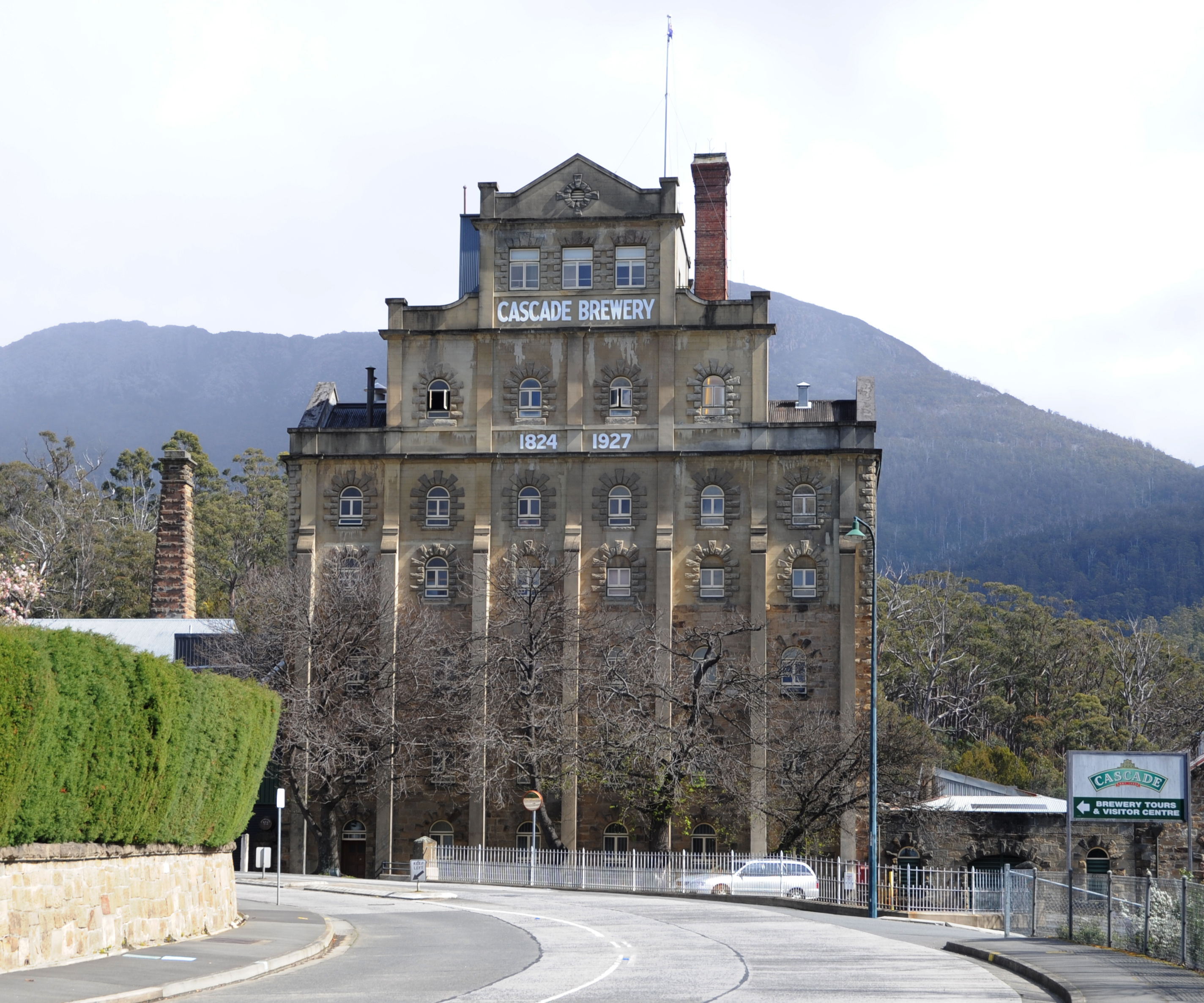
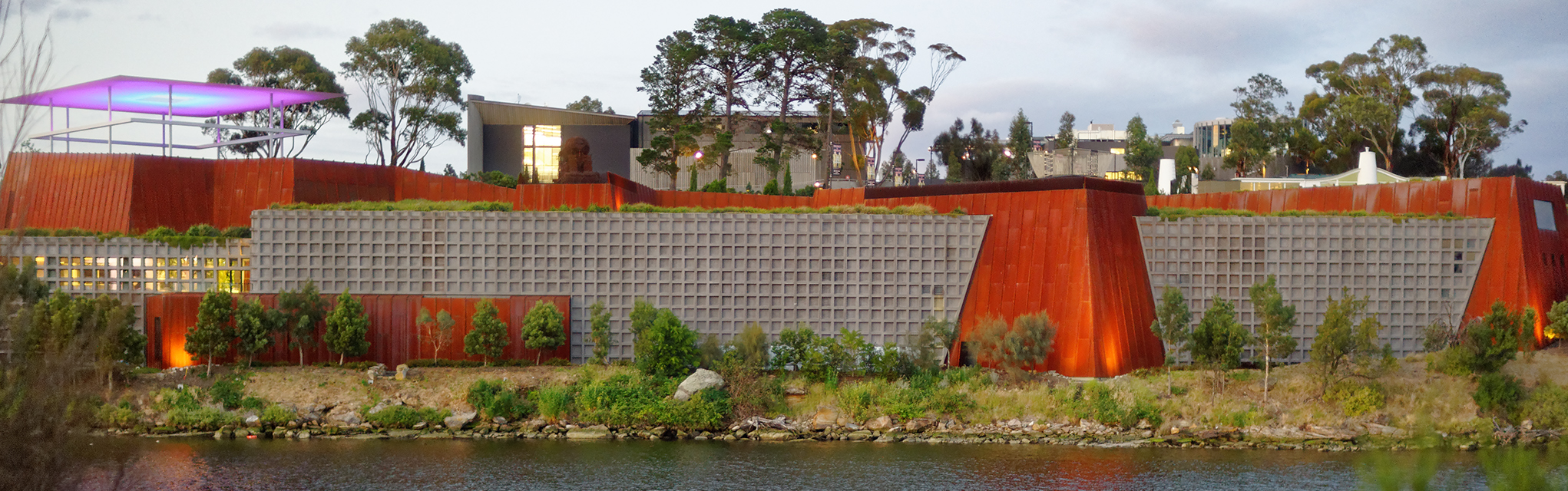
- Hobart City Centre and Mount Wellington General Post Office Parliament House of Tasmania Salamanca Place Cascade Brewery Museum of Old and New Art City logo

- Interactive map of Hobart
- Coordinates: 42°52′50″S 147°19′30″E
- Country: Australia
- State: Tasmania
- LGAs: Cities; City of Hobart; City of Glenorchy; City of Clarence; Other LGAs; Kingborough Council (Note: Excluding Bruny Island); Brighton Council; Sorell Council; Derwent Valley Council (Note: Only including New Norfolk); Huon Valley Council
- First People: palawa
- Location: 134 km (83 mi) from Swansea; 198 km (123 mi) from Launceston; 248 km (154 mi) from Queenstown; 284 km (176 mi) from Devonport; 325 km (202 mi) from Burnie
- Established: 20 February 1804

Government
  - State electorates: Clark; Franklin; Lyons
  - Federal divisions: Clark; Franklin; Lyons

Area
  - Total: 1,695.3 km^{2} (654.6 sq mi)

Population
  - Totals: 254,930 (2024) (11th); 197,451 (urban) (2021)
  - Density: 145.7/km^{2} (377/sq mi)(2021)
- Time zone: UTC+10 (AEST)
  - Summer (DST): UTC+11 (AEDT State: Tasmania.)
- Mean max temp: 17.6 °C (63.7 °F)
- Mean min temp: 9.0 °C (48.2 °F)
- Annual rainfall: 565.3 mm (22.26 in)

Hobart (/ˈhoʊbɑːrt/ HOH-bart; Southeast Tasmanian: nipaluna) is the capital and most populous city of the island state of Tasmania, Australia. Located in Tasmania's south-east on the estuary of the River Derwent, it is the southernmost capital city in Australia. Despite containing nearly half of Tasmania's population, Hobart is the least-populated Australian state capital city, and second-smallest by population and area after Darwin if territories are taken into account. Its skyline is dominated by the 1,271-metre (4,170 ft) kunanyi / Mount Wellington, and its harbour forms the second-deepest natural port in the world, with much of the city's waterfront consisting of reclaimed land. The metropolitan area is often referred to as Greater Hobart, to differentiate it from the City of Hobart, one of the seven local government areas that cover the city. It has a mild maritime climate.

The city lies on country which was known by the local Muwinina people as nipaluna, a name which includes surrounding features such as kunanyi / Mount Wellington and Timtumili Minanya (River Derwent). Prior to British colonisation, the land had been occupied for possibly as long as 35,000 years by Aboriginal Tasmanians, who generally refer to themselves as Palawa or Pakana.

Founded in 1804 as a British penal colony, Hobart is Australia's second-oldest capital city after Sydney, New South Wales. Whaling quickly emerged as a major industry in the area, and for a time Hobart served as the Southern Ocean's main whaling port. Penal transportation ended in the 1850s, after which the city experienced periods of growth and decline. The early 20th century saw an economic boom on the back of mining, agriculture and other primary industries, and the loss of men who served in the world wars was counteracted by an influx of immigration. Despite the rise in migration from Asia and other non-English speaking regions, Hobart's population is predominantly ethnically Anglo-Celtic and has the highest percentage of Australian-born residents among Australia's capital cities.

Today, Hobart is the financial and administrative hub of Tasmania, serving as the home port for both Australian and French Antarctic operations and acting as a tourist destination. Well-known drawcards include its convict-era architecture, Salamanca Market and the Museum of Old and New Art (MONA), the Southern Hemisphere's largest private museum.

== Name ==
In 1804, the settlement was named Hobart Town or Hobarton by the first Lt-governor David Collins after then British Secretary of State for war and the colonies Lord Hobart (a variant of Hubert, his name was pronounced with emphasis on the second syllable) at Sullivans Cove (named after the under-secretary). Earlier in 1793, Risdon Cove was named after the second officer on the ship Duke of Clarence by the captain John Hayes, and the river after the River Derwent, Cumbria (also briefly named by Bruni D'Entrecasteaux as La Rivière du Nord). The city was named the singular Hobart in 1881, and an inhabitant is known as a Hobartian.

Though the city is not officially dual-named, the 'saltwater country' of the western shore where the city is located has the palawa kani name nipaluna, which was originally documented on 16 January 1831 by George Augustus Robinson (as nibberloonne, later niberlooner) when he was told by Woureddy, a Nununi chief from Bruny Island who spoke five dialects. Though the island is offshore, the language is related and in the same family as the Southeastern Tasmanian language which the local Muwinina people spoke. Another recorded name was an Oyster Bay word lebralawaggena (Bedford).

A semi-permanent settlement at Little Sandy Bay was called kriwa beneath the hill of kriwalayti. The dividing line of the region is the timtumili minanya (river), which winds its way down from the centre of the island through the lands of the Big River (Lemerina) people. On the eastern shore, the name for the Clarence Plains was known as naniyilipata by the Mumirimina, a group of the Oyster Bay (Poredareme) people. Droughty Point was known as trumanyapayna (kangaroo point) as it was a hunting ground, and South Arm as mutatayna. Later names by the TAC include piyura kitina (little native hens) at Risdon Cove and turikina truwala (mountain waterfall) on the Myrtle Gully Falls track.

== History ==
The first European settlement began in 1803 as a military camp at Risdon Cove on the eastern shores of the River Derwent, amid British concerns over the presence of French explorers. It was the site of the 1804 Risdon Cove massacre. Later that year, along with the military, settlers and convicts from the abandoned Port Phillip settlement, the camp at Risdon Cove was moved by Captain David Collins to a better location at the present site of Hobart at Sullivans Cove.

The area's Indigenous inhabitants were members of the semi-nomadic Mouheneener tribe. Violent conflict with the European settlers, and the effects of diseases brought by them, dramatically reduced the Aboriginal population, which was rapidly replaced by free settlers and the convict population. In 1832, four years after martial law had been declared, 26 people, including Tongerlongeter (Tukalunginta) and Montpelliatta (Muntipiliyata) of the combined Big River and Oyster Bay nations, surrendered to G. A. Robinson's "friendly mission" and were marched into Hobart to negotiate a truce with Governor George Arthur. They were forcibly exiled ten days later to Flinders Island.

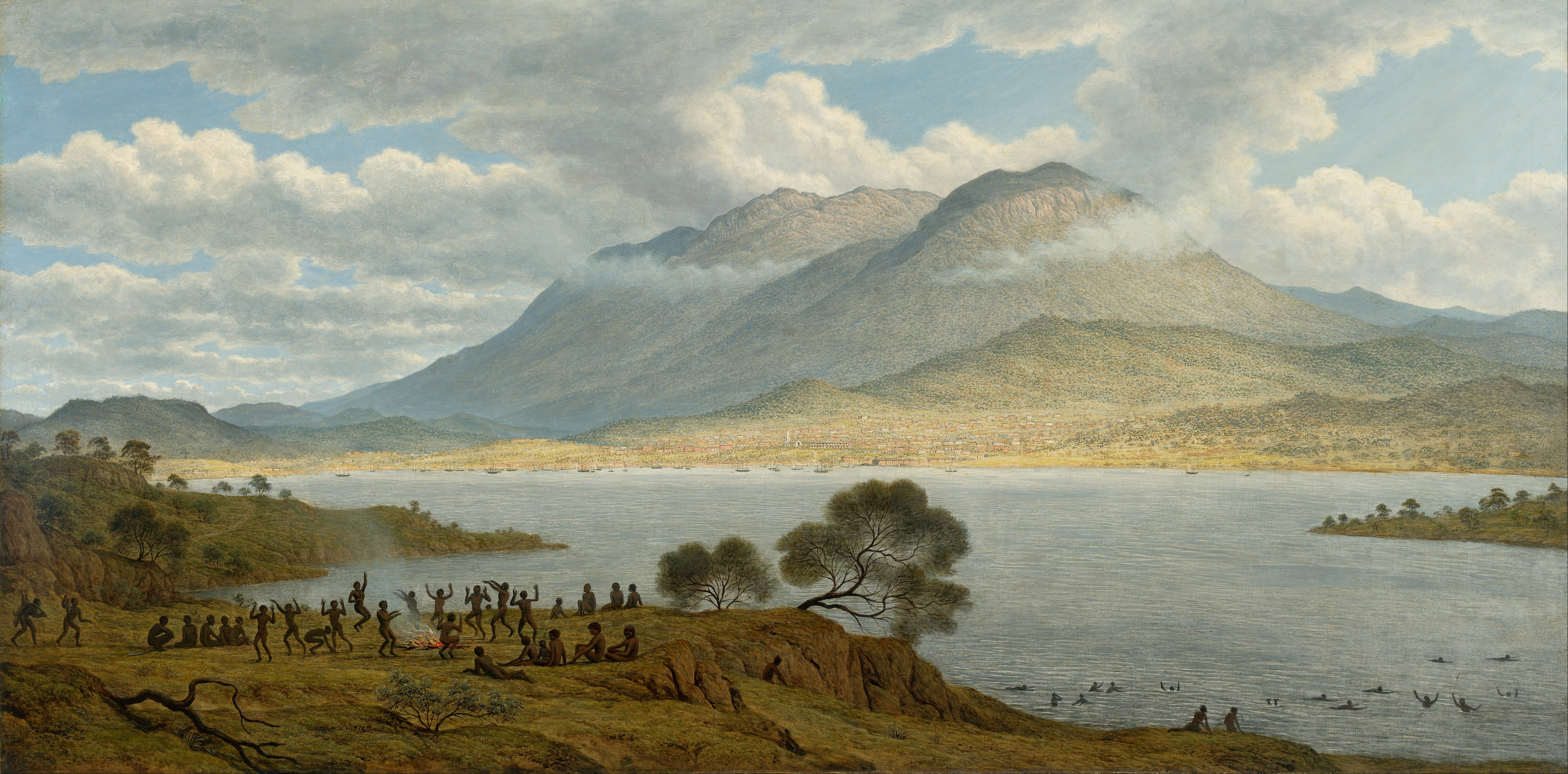
John Glover's 1834 painting Mount Wellington and Hobart Town from Kangaroo Point depicts Aboriginal Tasmanians dancing in the foreground. By this stage however, Aboriginal people had been forcibly exiled from the area following the Black War.

Charles Darwin visited Hobart Town in February 1836 as part of the Beagle expedition. He compares it to Sydney and compliments the "noble forest". He writes of Hobart and the Derwent estuary in The Voyage of the Beagle:

"...The lower parts of the hills which skirt the bay are cleared; and the bright yellow fields of corn, and dark green ones of potatoes, appear very luxuriant... I was chiefly struck with the comparative fewness of the large houses, either built or building. Hobart Town, from the census of 1835, contained 13,826 inhabitants, and the whole of Tasmania 36,505."

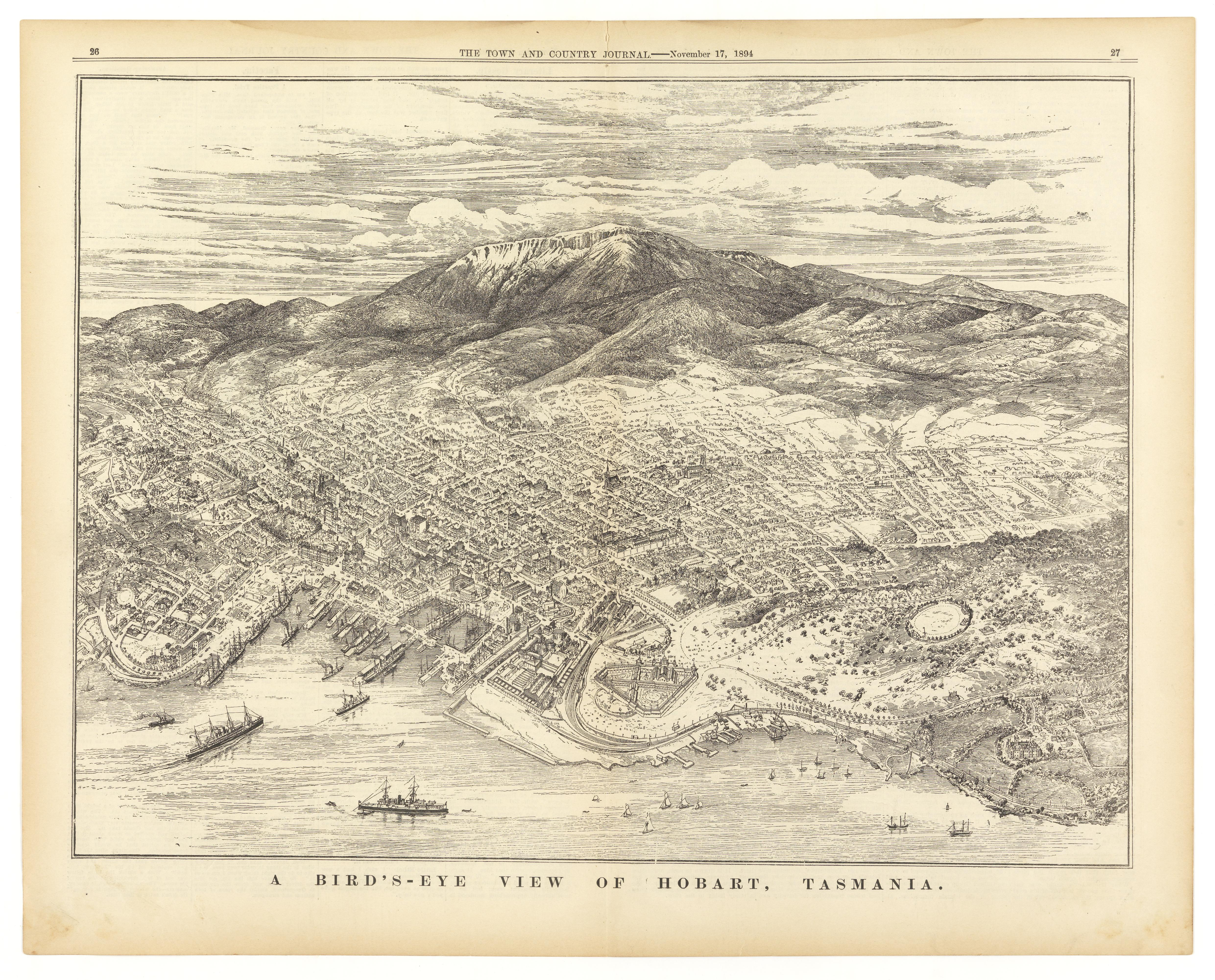
A bird's eye view of Hobart. The 1894 International Exhibition is visible near the future Hobart Cenotaph site

The River Derwent was one of Australia's finest deepwater ports and was the centre of South Seas whaling and sealing trades. The settlement rapidly grew into a major port, with allied industries such as shipbuilding.

Hobart Town became a city on 21 August 1842, and was renamed Hobart from the beginning of 1881. The post-transportation era saw the city shift between periods of economic uncertainty in the 1860s and 1890s:

"...While brash Victorians talked of the future, Tasmanians nurtured memories of a more prosperous past. In the 'sixties Martineau found elderly ladies lamenting the gaiety of the old days and merchants the time when 'Hobart Town promised to be the emporium if not the metropolis of Australia'."

However, this was mixed in with evolving politics, a greater connection with mainland Australia, tourism in the 1880s and the establishment of important cultural and social institutions including The University of Tasmania. "When the Town Hall was opened in 1866 it symbolised the hope of future greatness for the city". The Russian navy visited the port multiple times, which had become a leading reason for the Hobart coastal defences. Mark Twain also visited in 1895 when he wrote "Hobart has a peculiarity—it is the neatest town that the sun shines on; and I incline to believe that it is also the cleanest."

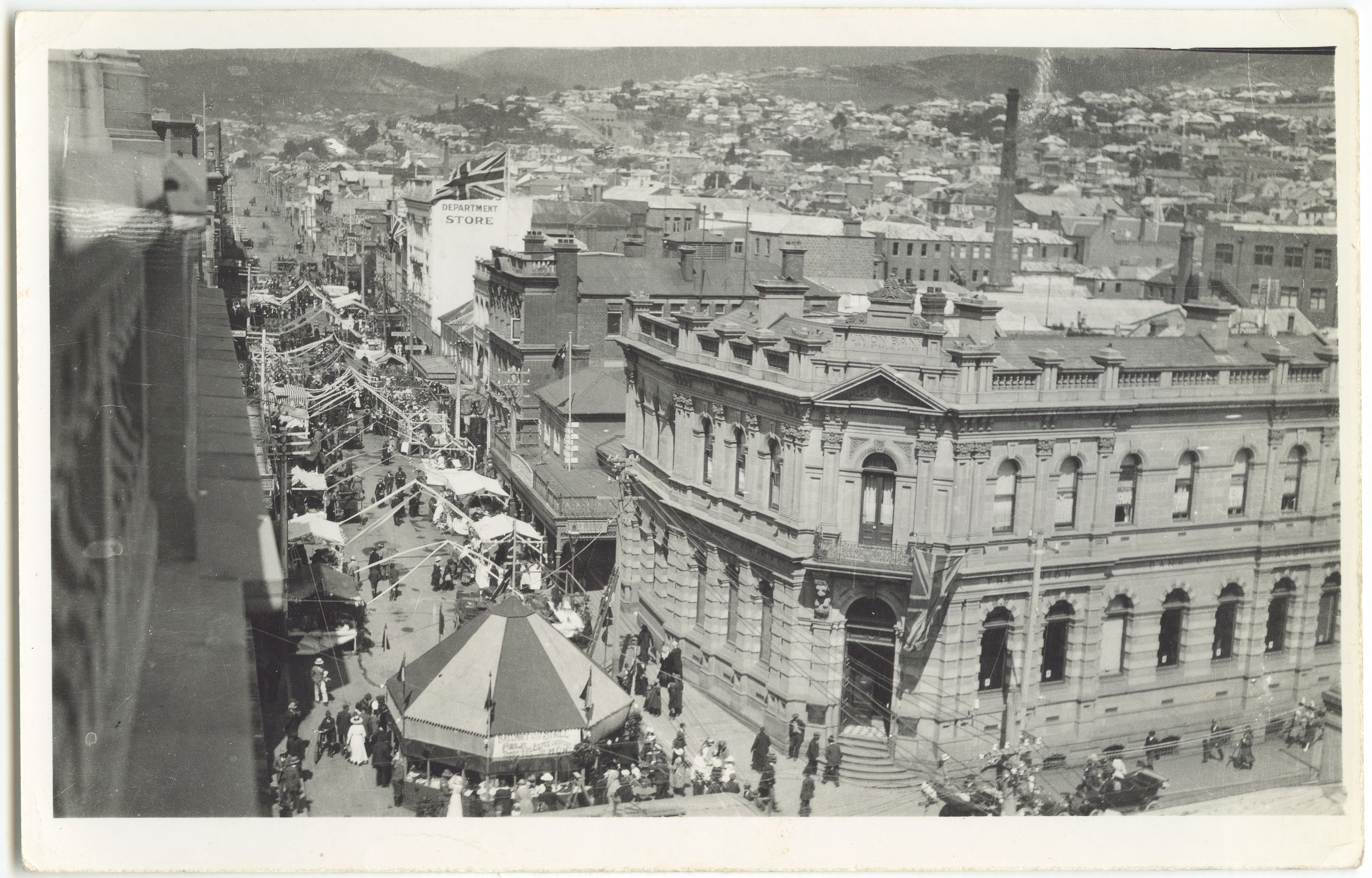
A carnival on Collins Street in 1915

On 7 September 1936, one of the last known surviving thylacines died at the Beaumaris Zoo in Hobart. During World War II, the city performed drills and built shelters, with German mines found in the estuary and a Japanese scout plane flyover in 1942. While Hobart was isolated, it also contained the not insignificant Electrolytic Zinc Company which was essential for ammunition production.

During the mid 20th century, the state and local governments invested in building Hobart's reputation as a tourist attraction—in 1956 the Lanherne Airport (now Hobart Airport) was opened. Australia's first legal casino, Wrest Point Hotel Casino, opened in 1973. Despite these successes, Hobart faced significant challenges during the 20th century, including the 1967 Tasmanian fires, which claimed 64 lives in Hobart itself and destroyed over 1200 homes, and the 1975 Tasman Bridge disaster, when a bulk ore carrier collided with and destroyed the concrete span bridge that connected the city to its eastern suburbs.

In the 21st century, Hobart benefited as Tasmania's economy recovered from the 1990s recession, and the city's long-stagnant population growth began to reverse. A period of significant growth has followed, including the redevelopment of the former Macquarie Point railyards, Parliament Square, and new hotel developments throughout the city.

== Geography ==
=== Topography ===
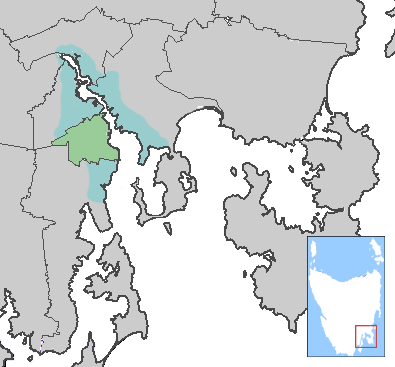
The City of Hobart (green) and Greater Hobart (teal). Greater Hobart covers 1,695.5 km^{2} (654.6 sq mi), whereas the built-up urban area covers 81 km^{2} (31 sq mi).

Hobart is located on the estuary of the River Derwent in the state's south-east. It is built predominantly on Jurassic dolerite around the foothills interspersed with smaller areas of Triassic siltstone and Permian mudstone, straddling the River Derwent.

The Western Shore extends from the Derwent Valley in the northwest through the flatter areas around Glenorchy (which rests on older Triassic sediment) bounded by peaks averaging around 1,000 metres (3,300 ft) (including Mount Wellington, Mount Hull, Mount Faulkner and Mount Dromedary). The hilly inner areas rest on the younger Jurassic dolerite deposits, before stretching into the lower areas such as the beaches of Sandy Bay in the south, while the City and Kingston are separated by Tolmans Hill and Taroona's Alum Cliffs. The Derwent estuary exits into Storm Bay wrapped by the South Arm Peninsula, Iron Pot and Betsey Island, with Turrakana and Bruny Island beyond.

The Eastern Shore also extends from the Derwent in a southeasterly direction hugging the Meehan Range (which hovers around 400 metres (1,300 ft) with distinctive summits such as Mount Direction, Flagstaff Hill and Gunners Quoin towards the irregular valleys of Brighton) before sprawling into flatter land in suburbs such as Bellerive. These flatter areas of the eastern shore rest on far younger Quaternary deposits. From there the city wraps around the estuary to peninsulas and extends across the hills in an easterly direction into the valley area of Rokeby, before reaching into the tidal flatland area of Lauderdale (between Ralphs Bay and Frederick Henry Bay).

Hobart has access to a number of beach areas including those in the Derwent estuary itself: Long Beach, Nutgrove Beach, Bellerive Beach, Cornelian Bay, Kingston, and Howrah Beaches, as well as many more in Frederick Henry Bay such as Seven Mile, Roaches, Cremorne, Clifton and Goats Beaches.

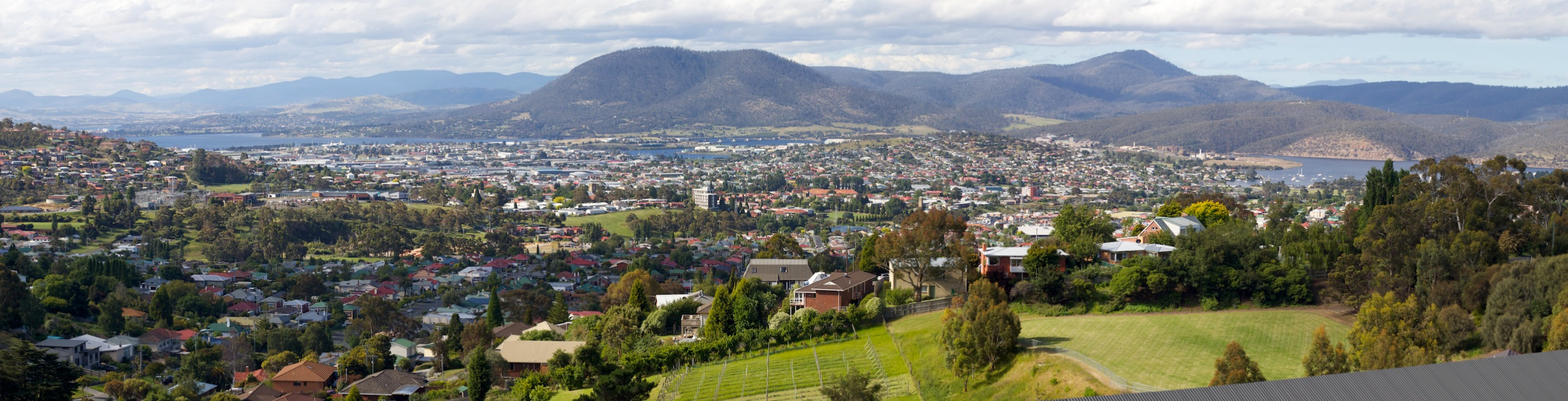
Panorama of the Hobart metropolitan area from Mount Stuart. In the background is Mount Direction with the Jordan River valley to the left and Shag Bay to the right

=== Ecology ===
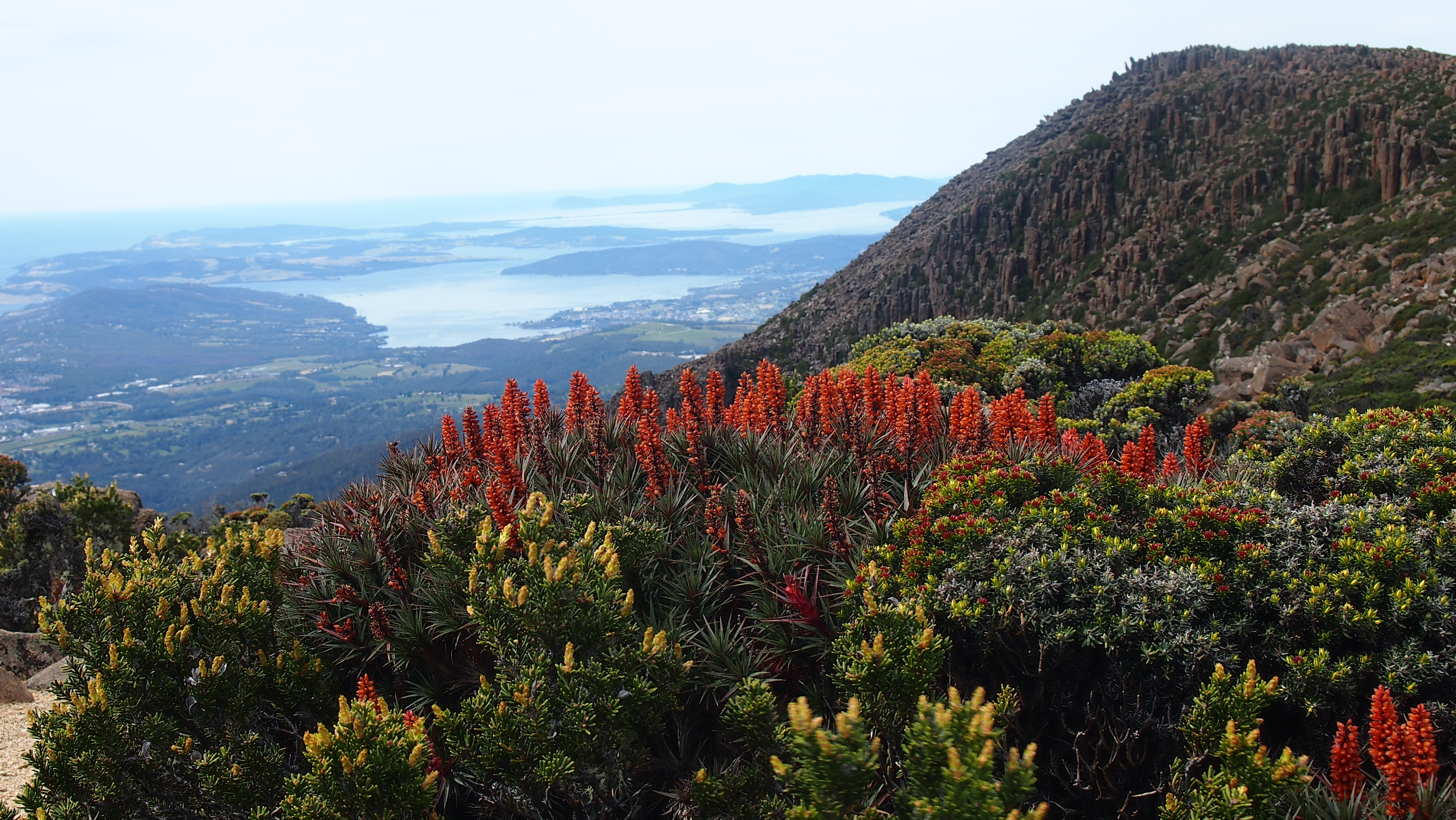
Richea scoparia flowering on kunanyi / Mount Wellington

Hobart is located on the edge of the Tasmanian South East and Tasmanian Southern Ranges IBRA bioregions as well as being surrounded by parts of the South-east Tasmania Important Bird Area (such as the Meehan and Wellington Ranges) which provide important habitat for Tasmanian birds. The East Risdon State Reserve contains the wattles Derwent cascade and Acacia riceana, as well as the rare or endangered Risdon peppermint and Eucalyptus morrisbyi. Other local plant species like heartleaf silver gum and the abundant blue gum are also planted horticulturally, while many exotic species were planted as a result of aesthetic preferences from British colonisation. Black peppermint, silver peppermint, blue wattle, blackwood, drooping sheoak and cherry ballart are another common woodland combination.

Threatened species of wildlife found in Hobart include the swift parrot, grey goshawk, Tasmanian masked owl, eastern barred bandicoot and eastern quoll. These amount to 11 species of fauna, 10 of flora and 4 vegetation communities. 5 of the threatened species are endemic to Hobart. A common sight within the city are pademelons and wallabies.

The Hobart Rivulet is home to urban platypuses. A local community group – Hobart Rivulet Platypus - is dedicated to the conservation and protection of Hobart's urban platypus population, vigorously campaigning on their behalf. As a result, the health of the Hobart Rivulet has improved over recent years. Wildlife groups and road safety advocates have also highlighted the role of slower speeds in reducing urban roadkill and traffic injuries.

While parts of Mount Wellington have been cleared in the past (and species like celery top pine were allegedly present), stands of old-growth white gums accompanied by giant stringybarks (such as the Octopus tree) remain there. A rare patch of non-sclerophyll Tasmanian rainforest dominated by myrtle beech and blackheart sassafras is located near Collinsvale. A famous tree within the city of Hobart is the Anglesea Barracks blue gum which may have been a seedling before the colonial era.

=== Climate ===
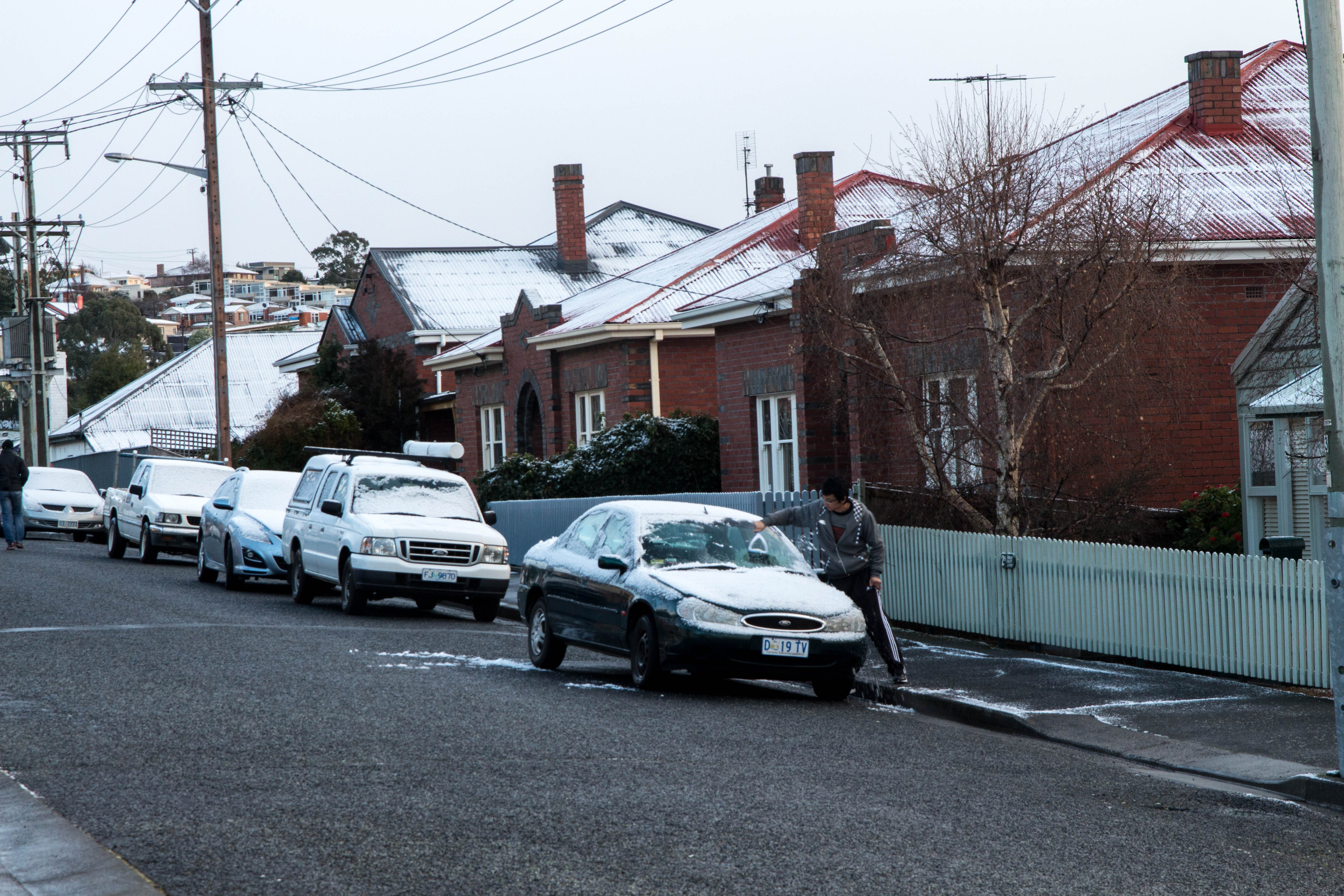
Snow in Hobart, 2015. While sleet is not rare in Hobart during the colder months, and many outer suburbs receive snow frequently, snow is rare in the inner suburbs.

Hobart has a cool to mild oceanic climate (Köppen: Cfb; Trewartha: Cflk). The highest temperature recorded was 41.8 °C (107.2 °F) on 4 January 2013 and the lowest was −2.8 °C (27.0 °F) on 25 June 1972 and 11 July 1981. By global standards, Hobart has cool summers and mild winters for its latitude, being influenced by its seaside location. Nevertheless, the strong northerly winds from the Australian outback ensure that Hobart experiences temperatures above 35 °C (95 °F) most years.

Annually, Hobart receives only 40.8 clear days. Compared to other major Australian cities, Hobart has the fewest daily average hours of sunshine, with only 5.9 hours per day. However, during the summer it has the most hours of daylight of any Australian city, with 15.3 hours on the summer solstice. Hobart has nonetheless exceptionally sunny winters by Tasmanian standards, where its sun hours in June and July exceed those of Wagga Wagga in New South Wales (especially when accounting for latitudinal day length). Strathgordon at the same latitude averages only 51 and 62 sun hours in June and July (compared with Hobart's 132 and 152 hours). This is due to the foehn effect created by the Central Highlands to the west.

Light frost occurs most years, though air frosts are uncommon. Although Hobart itself rarely receives snow due to the foehn effect, the adjacent Mount Wellington is frequently seen with a snowcap throughout the year. During the 20th century, the city itself has received snowfalls at sea level on average only once every 5 years; however, outer suburbs lying higher on the slopes of Mount Wellington receive snow more often, owing to the more exposed location coupled with their higher altitude. These snow-bearing winds often carry on through Tasmania and southern Victoria, to the Snowy Mountains in north-east Victoria and southern New South Wales (though to a much lesser degree outside of winter). Nevertheless, sleet can occur in Hobart from June to September.

Average sea temperatures range from 12.5 °C (54.5 °F) in September to 16.5 °C (61.7 °F) in February.

Climate data for Hobart (Battery Point) 1991–2020 averages, 1882–present extremes
Month	Jan	Feb	Mar	Apr	May	Jun	Jul	Aug	Sep	Oct	Nov	Dec	Year
Record high °C (°F)	41.8 (107.2)	40.1 (104.2)	39.1 (102.4)	32.3 (90.1)	26.9 (80.4)	20.6 (69.1)	22.1 (71.8)	24.5 (76.1)	31.0 (87.8)	34.6 (94.3)	36.8 (98.2)	40.8 (105.4)	41.8 (107.2)
Mean maximum °C (°F)	35.2 (95.4)	33.3 (91.9)	30.8 (87.4)	25.5 (77.9)	21.3 (70.3)	17.5 (63.5)	16.7 (62.1)	19.6 (67.3)	22.8 (73.0)	27.2 (81.0)	30.3 (86.5)	32.1 (89.8)	36.9 (98.4)
Mean daily maximum °C (°F)	22.7 (72.9)	22.2 (72.0)	20.7 (69.3)	17.9 (64.2)	15.3 (59.5)	12.7 (54.9)	12.6 (54.7)	13.7 (56.7)	15.7 (60.3)	17.6 (63.7)	19.1 (66.4)	21.0 (69.8)	17.6 (63.7)
Daily mean °C (°F)	17.9 (64.2)	17.5 (63.5)	16.2 (61.2)	13.7 (56.7)	11.5 (52.7)	9.1 (48.4)	8.9 (48.0)	9.7 (49.5)	11.3 (52.3)	13.0 (55.4)	14.6 (58.3)	16.3 (61.3)	13.3 (55.9)
Mean daily minimum °C (°F)	13.0 (55.4)	12.8 (55.0)	11.6 (52.9)	9.4 (48.9)	7.6 (45.7)	5.5 (41.9)	5.2 (41.4)	5.6 (42.1)	6.9 (44.4)	8.3 (46.9)	10.0 (50.0)	11.6 (52.9)	9.0 (48.2)
Mean minimum °C (°F)	8.2 (46.8)	7.9 (46.2)	6.4 (43.5)	4.2 (39.6)	2.8 (37.0)	0.9 (33.6)	1.1 (34.0)	1.4 (34.5)	2.2 (36.0)	3.3 (37.9)	5.0 (41.0)	6.7 (44.1)	0.5 (32.9)
Record low °C (°F)	3.3 (37.9)	3.4 (38.1)	1.8 (35.2)	0.7 (33.3)	−1.6 (29.1)	−2.8 (27.0)	−2.8 (27.0)	−1.8 (28.8)	−0.8 (30.6)	0.0 (32.0)	0.3 (32.5)	3.3 (37.9)	−2.8 (27.0)
Average rainfall mm (inches)	43.7 (1.72)	37.8 (1.49)	37.0 (1.46)	42.6 (1.68)	39.2 (1.54)	46.0 (1.81)	44.5 (1.75)	63.0 (2.48)	55.6 (2.19)	52.8 (2.08)	50.7 (2.00)	53.0 (2.09)	565.9 (22.28)
Average precipitation days (≥ 0.2 mm)	9.5	9.1	11.3	11.1	12.0	12.4	14.1	15.3	15.7	15.0	13.5	11.7	150.7
Average rainy days (≥ 1 mm)	5.5	5.2	6.7	7.2	6.5	7.2	8.4	9.9	9.7	9.2	8.1	7.4	91.0
Average afternoon relative humidity (%)	51	52	52	56	58	64	61	56	53	51	53	49	55
Mean monthly sunshine hours	257.3	226.0	210.8	177.0	148.8	132.0	151.9	179.8	195.0	232.5	234.0	248.0	2,393.1
Percentage possible sunshine	59	62	57	59	53	49	53	58	59	58	56	53	56
Source 1: Bureau of Meteorology (1991–2020 averages; extremes 1882–present)
Source 2: Bureau of Meteorology, Hobart Airport (sunshine hours)

Climate data for Hobart Airport (Cambridge) 1991–2020 averages, 1958–2022 extremes
Month	Jan	Feb	Mar	Apr	May	Jun	Jul	Aug	Sep	Oct	Nov	Dec	Year
Record high °C (°F)	41.4 (106.5)	39.8 (103.6)	38.1 (100.6)	31.8 (89.2)	25.6 (78.1)	19.6 (67.3)	20.4 (68.7)	23.7 (74.7)	31.1 (88.0)	33.4 (92.1)	38.5 (101.3)	40.8 (105.4)	41.4 (106.5)
Mean maximum °C (°F)	35.2 (95.4)	33.3 (91.9)	31.2 (88.2)	25.5 (77.9)	21.5 (70.7)	17.6 (63.7)	16.8 (62.2)	19.4 (66.9)	22.4 (72.3)	27.0 (80.6)	30.2 (86.4)	32.2 (90.0)	36.9 (98.4)
Mean daily maximum °C (°F)	23.1 (73.6)	22.5 (72.5)	21.1 (70.0)	18.2 (64.8)	15.6 (60.1)	13.2 (55.8)	13.0 (55.4)	13.9 (57.0)	15.7 (60.3)	17.7 (63.9)	19.5 (67.1)	21.4 (70.5)	17.9 (64.2)
Daily mean °C (°F)	17.9 (64.2)	17.5 (63.5)	16.1 (61.0)	13.5 (56.3)	11.3 (52.3)	9.1 (48.4)	8.7 (47.7)	9.5 (49.1)	11.1 (52.0)	12.8 (55.0)	14.6 (58.3)	16.3 (61.3)	13.2 (55.8)
Mean daily minimum °C (°F)	12.6 (54.7)	12.4 (54.3)	11.0 (51.8)	8.8 (47.8)	6.9 (44.4)	4.9 (40.8)	4.4 (39.9)	5.0 (41.0)	6.4 (43.5)	7.9 (46.2)	9.7 (49.5)	11.2 (52.2)	8.4 (47.1)
Mean minimum °C (°F)	7.1 (44.8)	7.0 (44.6)	5.6 (42.1)	3.3 (37.9)	1.9 (35.4)	0.1 (32.2)	0.2 (32.4)	0.5 (32.9)	1.4 (34.5)	2.6 (36.7)	4.3 (39.7)	5.8 (42.4)	−0.4 (31.3)
Record low °C (°F)	3.7 (38.7)	3.4 (38.1)	2.2 (36.0)	−0.6 (30.9)	−2.2 (28.0)	−3.9 (25.0)	−3.2 (26.2)	−2.0 (28.4)	−2.3 (27.9)	−1.0 (30.2)	1.7 (35.1)	2.7 (36.9)	−3.9 (25.0)
Average rainfall mm (inches)	40.7 (1.60)	35.2 (1.39)	34.1 (1.34)	35.6 (1.40)	30.4 (1.20)	38.9 (1.53)	33.8 (1.33)	46.0 (1.81)	39.8 (1.57)	40.2 (1.58)	42.2 (1.66)	46.6 (1.83)	463.5 (18.25)
Average rainy days (≥ 0.2 mm)	9.0	8.8	10.3	10.1	10.3	11.4	13.0	13.6	13.9	13.3	12.4	11.3	137.4
Average afternoon relative humidity (%)	49	51	50	54	57	62	60	55	52	50	50	47	53
Source: Bureau of Meteorology

Climate data for Hobart
Month	Jan	Feb	Mar	Apr	May	Jun	Jul	Aug	Sep	Oct	Nov	Dec	Year
Average sea temperature °C (°F)	16.9 (62.4)	16.4 (61.5)	16.4 (61.5)	15.4 (59.7)	14.6 (58.3)	13.6 (56.5)	12.9 (55.2)	12.7 (54.9)	12.7 (54.9)	13.1 (55.6)	14.4 (57.9)	15.9 (60.6)	14.6 (58.3)
Mean daily daylight hours	15.0	14.0	12.0	11.0	10.0	9.0	9.0	10.0	12.0	13.0	15.0	15.0	12.1
Average Ultraviolet index	11	9	6	4	2	1	1	2	4	6	8	10	5.3
Source: Weather Atlas, seatemperature.org

== Urban structure ==
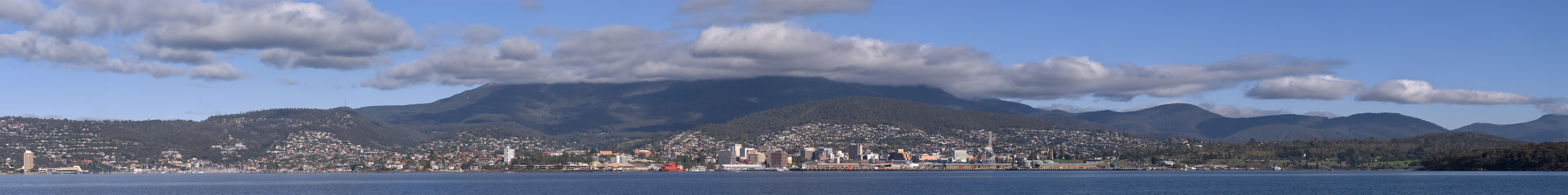
Hobart area from Bellerive Beach

=== Parks and nature reserves ===
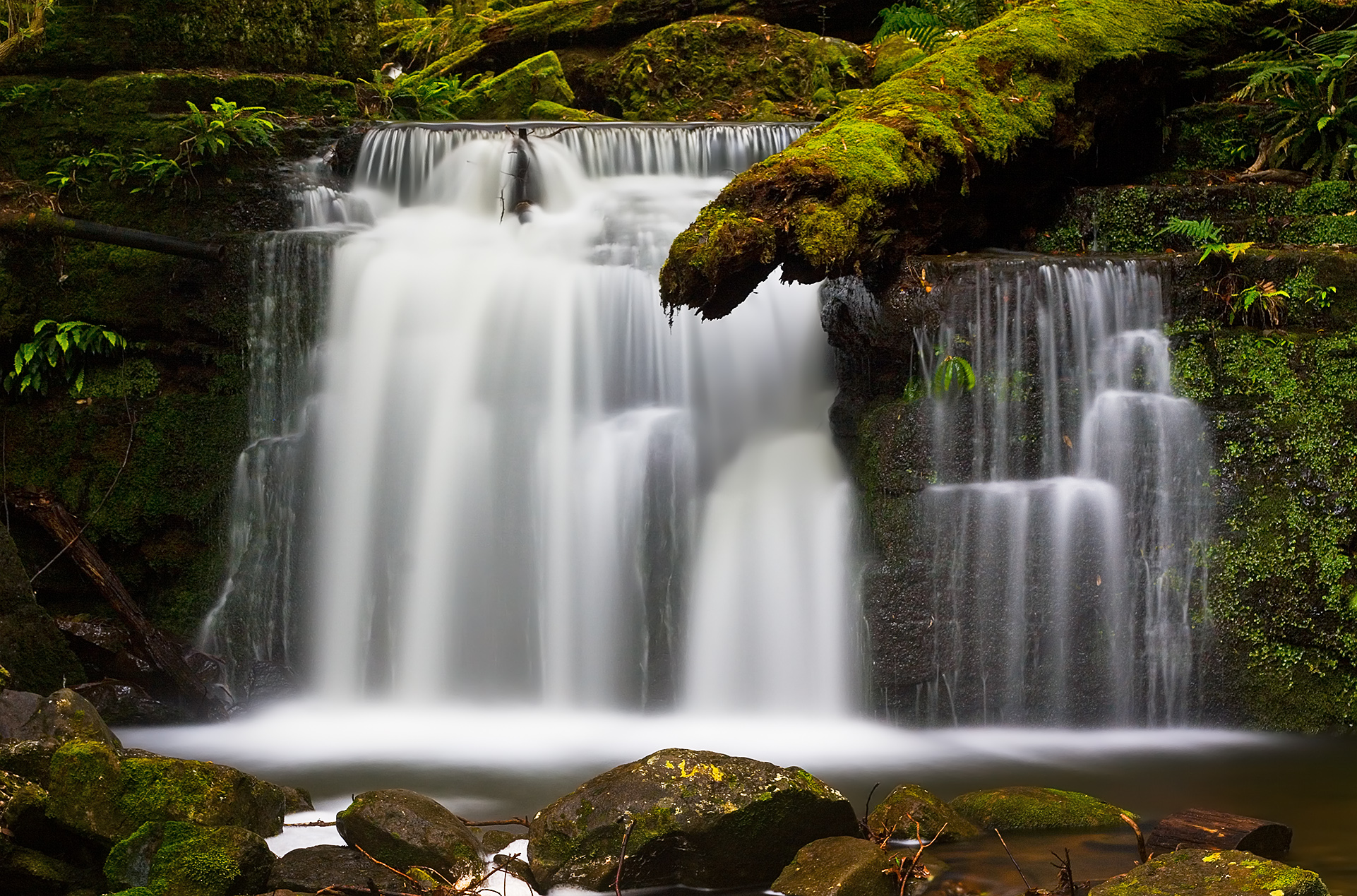
Strickland Falls on the upper Hobart Rivulet

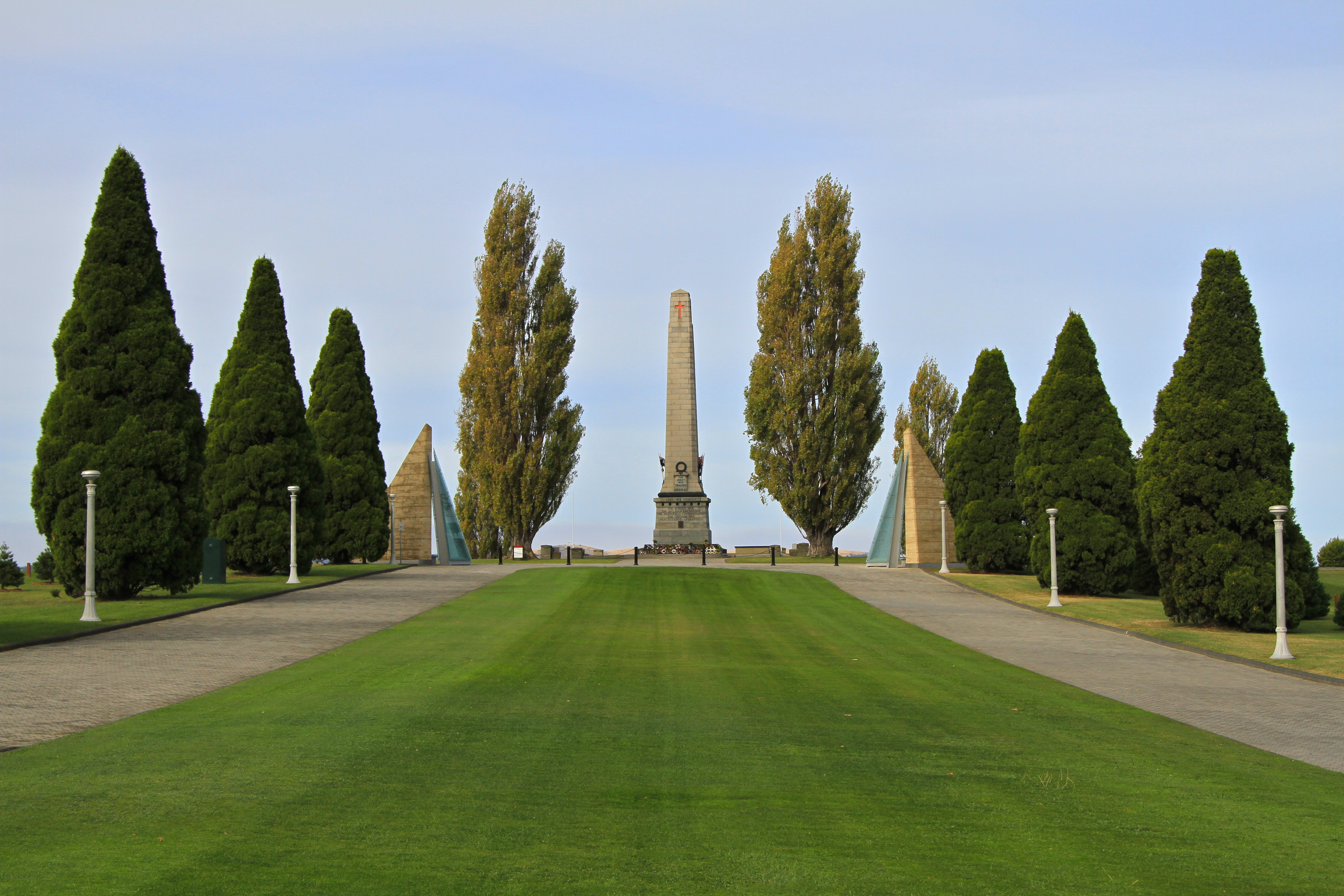
The Hobart Cenotaph, located within Queens Domain

Hobart has a diverse array of natural areas, parks and gardens. It is most notably defined by its large areas of native bushland owing to its location. The most prominent of these is Wellington Park which encompasses the plateau of Mount Wellington itself as well as much of the surrounding alpine woodland and dense forests. This is taken advantage of with a large number of trails for walking, hiking and mountain biking activities all across the Hobart metropolitan area, some of which follow watercourses like the Hobart Linear Park (Cascade Gardens), Lambert Park, New Town Rivulet (Ancanthe Park) and Tolosa Park, or ridgelines to viewing points in places like the Truganini Conservation Area and Bicentennial Park. The former Fern Tree Bower of Dicksonia antarctica can be visited on the Pipeline Track.

The city also has many urban bushland areas, most prominent of which is the centrally located Queens Domain which contains the Royal Tasmanian Botanical Gardens established in 1818 (which, though ringed by expressways, remain a highly popular destination with a variety of attractions), the Hobart Cenotaph (accessed via the Bridge of Remembrance and Hobart Regatta grounds which link to the Intercity Cycleway), the University Rose Gardens, a number of sporting facilities (like the Domain Athletic Centre and Doone Kennedy Hobart Aquatic Centre), and formerly the Hobart Zoo (a role now taken up by Bonorong Wildlife Sanctuary in Brighton). Areas along the eastern shore also provide recreation, including many coastal walks to areas like Kangaroo Bluff (one of many former Hobart coastal defences which are now parks) and the Kangaroo Bay Parkland (near Charles Hand Park and the Rosny Parklands) in Bellerive, Anzac Park and Simmons Park in Lindisfarne, Wentworth park at Howrah Beach, as well as hills within the urban area such as Gordons Hill, Natone Hill, Rokeby Hills, Waverly Flora Park and the panoramic lookout at Rosny Hill.

In the city, many urban parks and gardens have sprung up over the years, like St David's Park, Franklin Square, the Parliament or Salamanca Gardens, Boat Park (Princes Park), Fitzroy Gardens and St Andrews Park, along with newer pocket parks like the Garden of Memories on Elizabeth Street. Inner suburban parks like Wellesley Park in South Hobart, the Train Park (Caldew Park) in West Hobart, and the Cultural Skatepark and Soundy Park in North Hobart are also popular. Parks continue to extend along the complex coastline of the estuary, from the birdwatching area of Goulds Lagoon, Old Beach's "little doors", the Claremont Cenotaph by Windermere Beach, Moorilla Estate winery, Glenorchy Art and Sculpture Park (GASP) with the Montrose Boardwalk, Giblins Reserve and Cornelian Bay to the north, and the Battery Point Sculpture Trail, Errol Flynn Reserve, Long Beach Reserve by Nutgrove Beach and the Alexandra Battery, and Kingston Park to the south.

Annotated view of Hobart straddled along the estuary as seen from kunanyi / Mt Wellington

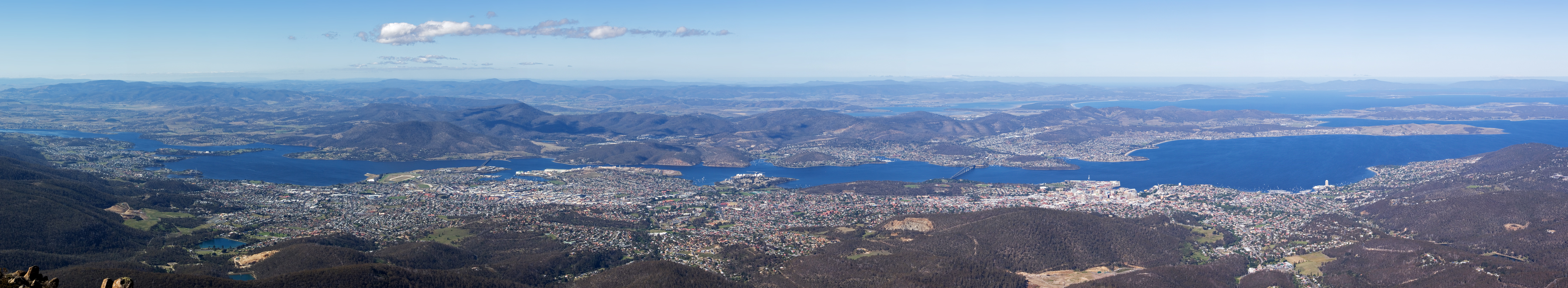

1	Wrest Point Casino
2	MONA
3	Tasman Bridge

4	Bowen Bridge
5	Risdon Zinc Works
6	Queens Domain

7	Meehan Range
8	Knocklofty
9	Tolosa Park

10	Mount Nelson
11	River Derwent
12	Pitt Water

13	Risdon Cove
14	Hobart CBD
15	Glenorchy

=== Architecture ===
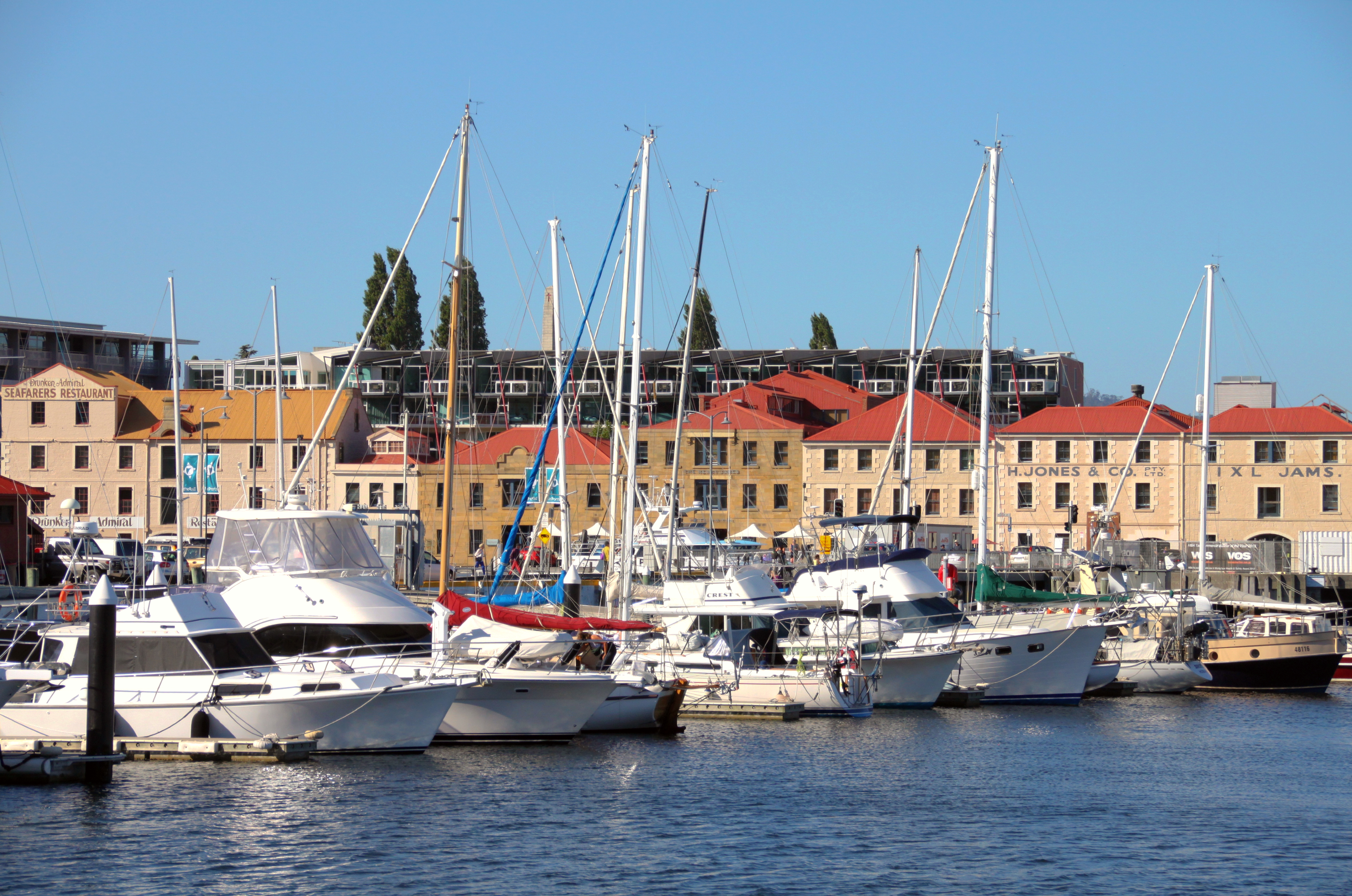
The Hunter Street Precinct is known for its Georgian era waterfront warehouses, since converted into restaurants, bars and galleries.

Hobart's architecture is stylistically eclectic and reflects various periods of Australian history. The city is known for its well-preserved Georgian and Victorian-era buildings, giving specific areas an "Old World" feel. For locals, this became a source of discomfiture about the city's convict past, but is now a draw card for tourists.

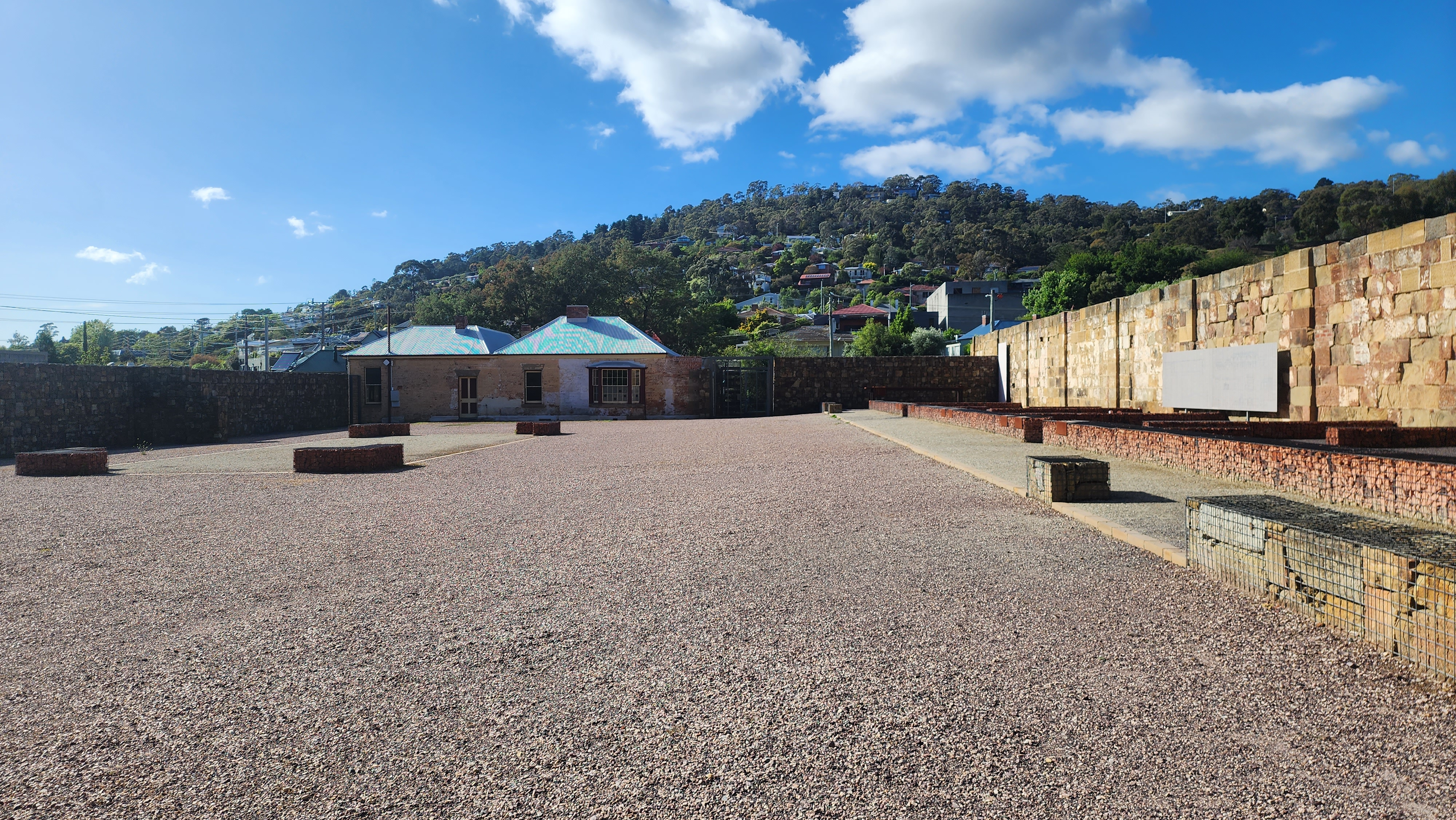
A yard and cottages within the Cascades Female Factory, one of eleven UNESCO World Heritage-listed Australian Convict Sites

The city centre contains many of the city's oldest buildings, including the Hope and Anchor Tavern (1807) and Ingle Hall (1811–14). The Cascade Brewery (1824), Australia's longest operating brewery, was built using convict labour, as was the Cascades Female Factory (1828), now a UNESCO World Heritage Site. Other notable early buildings include: Hadley's Orient Hotel (1834), Australia's oldest continuously operating hotel; the Theatre Royal (1837), Australia's oldest continually operating theatre; the Greek revival Lady Franklin Gallery (1843), Australia's first private museum; and the Hobart Synagogue (1845), which is Australia's oldest synagogue and a rare example of an Egyptian revival synagogue. Salamanca Place contains many Georgian era buildings, as well as Kelly's Steps, which were built in 1839 to provide a short-cut to Battery Point, a largely residential suburb known for its weatherboard cottages and multi-storey terraces.

Government architect John Lee Archer designed the Regency-style Customs House (1840), facing Sullivans Cove and now used as Parliament House. He also designed the Gothic revival Engineers Building (1847) later used as the Tasmanian Main Line Company headquarters. Nearby are more buildings in the same style, Australia's oldest tertiary institution was based in the former Hobart High School from 1848 (Domain House, now owned by UTAS), and the Government House building was built in 1857 and is the third iteration. Henry Hunter was an architect known for churches such as St Mary's Cathedral (1898), but he also designed Hobart Town Hall (1866), located on the site of the old Government House.

The TMAG building, built in 1902 as a new Second Empire style Customs House, is situated on Constitution Dock and incorporates the Bond (1824) and Commisariat Store buildings (1810), the latter of which contributed to Hobart's early street layout when the Hobart Rivulet passed beside it. Away from the mouth of the rivulet was Hunter Island and after 1820 was also used for extensive warehousing.

Hobart is home to many historic churches. The Scots Church (formerly known as St Andrew's) was built in Bathurst Street from 1834 to 1836, and a small sandstone building within the churchyard was used as the city's first Presbyterian Church. St John's in New Town, featuring a clocktower and turrets, sat in the middle of the Queens Orphanage complex (now near the Hobart City High School) from 1835. The Greek revival St George's Anglican Church in Battery Point was completed in 1838, and a classical tower designed by James Blackburn (who also designed the Holy Trinity Church) was added in 1847. St Joseph's was built in 1840 and the Davey Street Congregational Church in 1857. St David's Cathedral, Hobart's first, was consecrated in 1874. The grand Queen Anne style Mount Saint Canice (1893) sits above Sandy Bay.

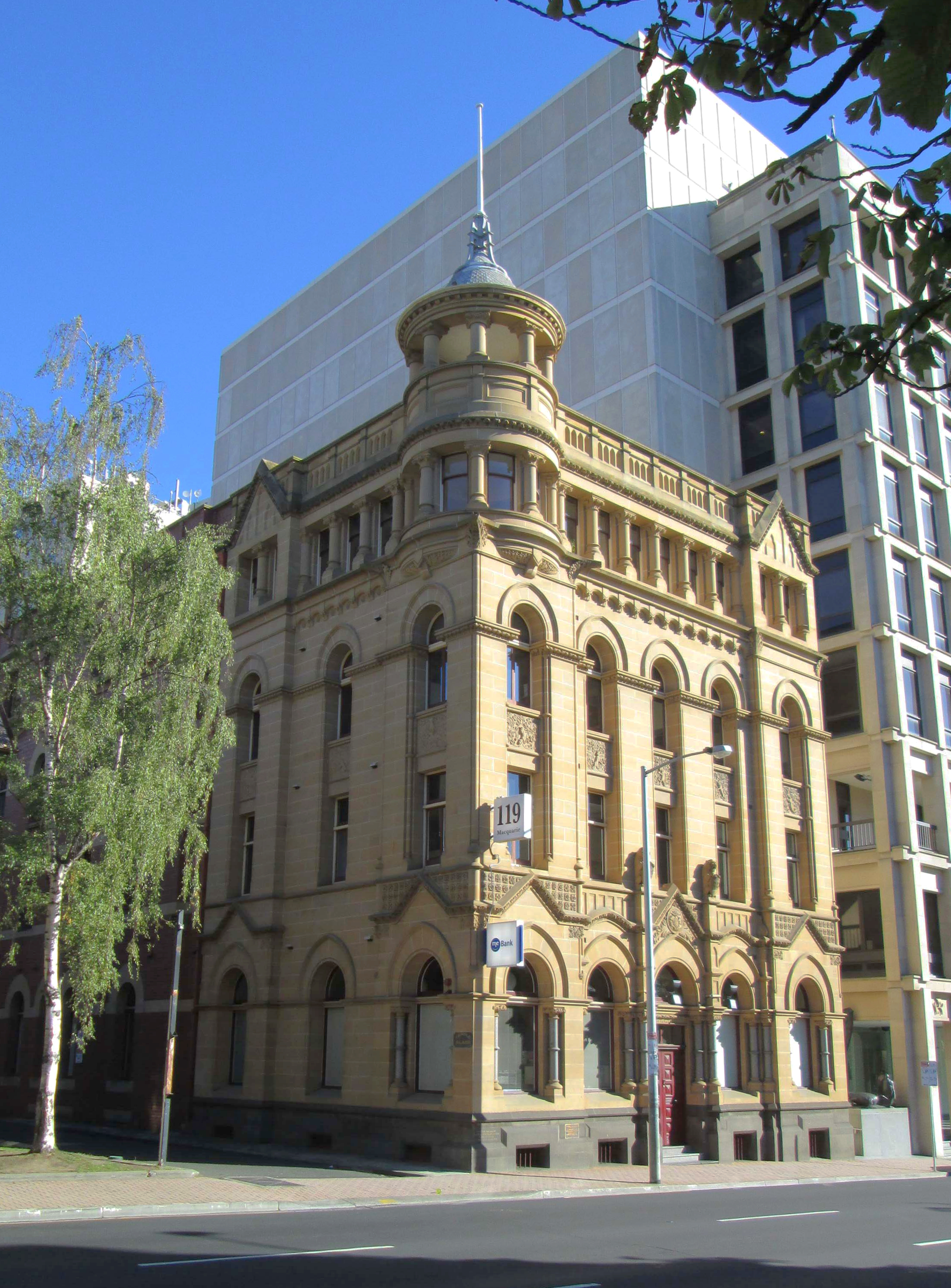
The neo-gothic National Mutual Life Building (1906) next to the brutalist RBA Building (1977)

The Edwardian Baroque GPO was built in 1905, and the Hobart City Hall was built in 1915 in a Federation warehouse style on the former city marketplace. The North Hobart Post Office (1913) of a John Smith Murdoch design is in a colourful Edwardian style. Hobart is also home to a number of Art Deco landmarks, including the T&G building (1938) on Murray Street, the Old Mercury Building on Macquarie Street (1938), the former Hydro Tasmania (1938) and the Colonial Mutual Life buildings (1936) on Elizabeth Street. The 1939 Streamline Moderne Riviera Hotel is joined by what remains the tallest building in Tasmania, the Wrest Point Casino (1973) designed by Roy Grounds in Moderne. Several of the tallest buildings in Hobart were built in this era, such as the International Style MLC building (1958–77), the Empress Towers (1967), the Brutalist NAB House (1968) and former Reserve Bank Building (1977), and the brown-coloured Modernist Marine Board Building (1972) and Jaffa Building (1978). Dorney House (1978) at the former Fort Nelson is an example of residential modernism.

The postmodern Hotel Grand Chancellor was built in 1987 in what was the Wapping neighbourhood, which now features many examples of contemporary architecture, such as the 2001 Federation Concert Hall and The Hedberg, designed in 2013 around Conceptualism. The distinctive shapes of the 2020 K-Block redevelopment of the Royal Hobart Hospital was based on the street grid and convict-made Rajah Quilt. Nearby is the Menzies Institute and UTAS Medical Science Precinct, which features two 2009 examples of avant-garde styles inspired by land-water interplay. On Castray Esplanade, the Salamanca Wharf Hotel was built in 2013 and combines Antarctic colours with the surrounding former-ordnance warehouses. The Myer Centre Icon Complex was completed in 2020 as a replacement for the 1908 Liverpool Street building which burnt down in 2007, while retaining the façade on Murray Street. Projects designed by local architects include the Mövenpick Hotel, built in 2021 by Jaws.

=== Housing ===
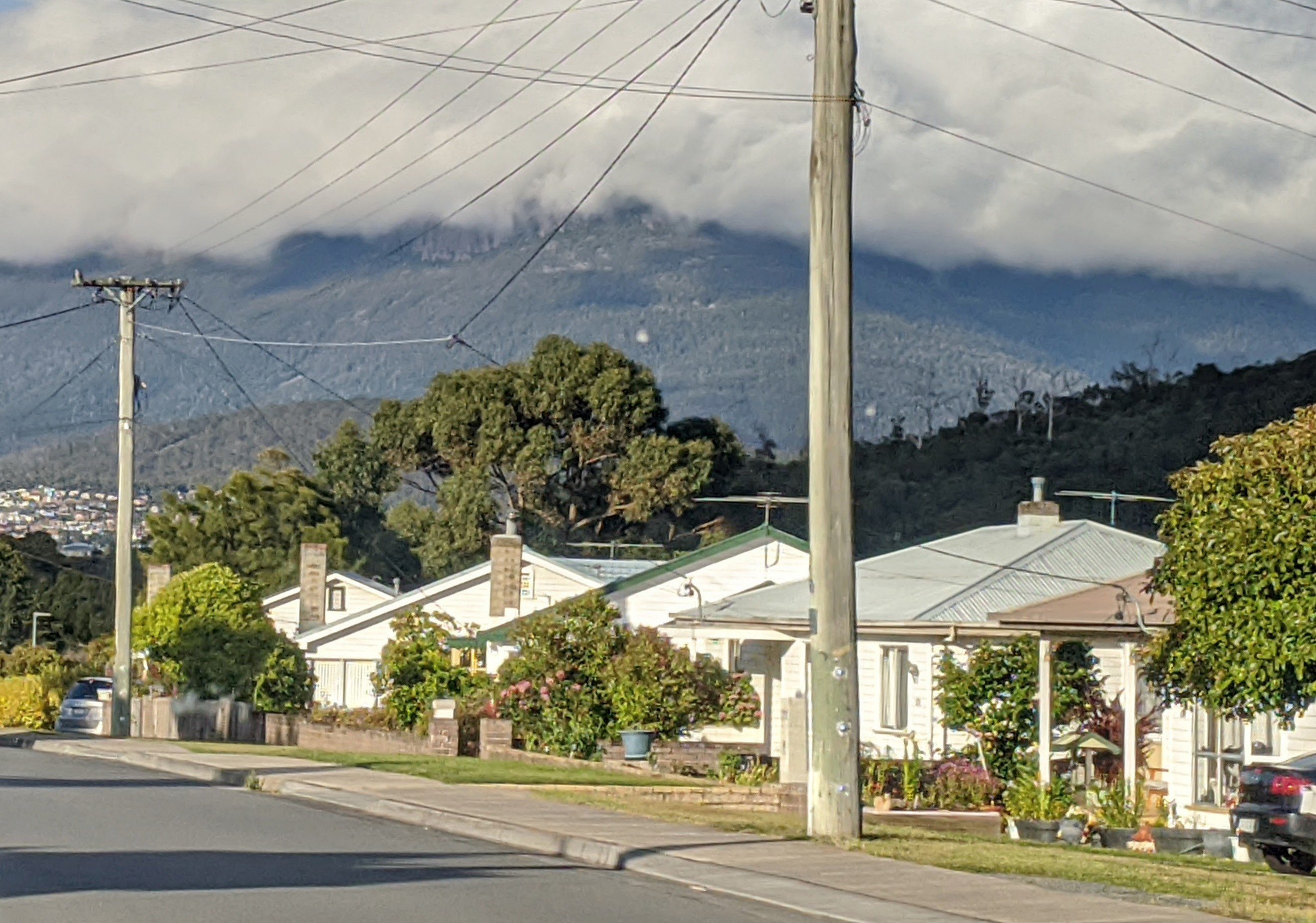
Post-war housing is common throughout the city

Hobart as a city has delivered its housing by various means and forms. For its early history, housing was small-scale but clustered in very small areas (the highest concentration and diversity of Hobart's heritage remains around the constantly-evolving city centre). With the development of streets and public transport, such as a railway in 1876 and Australia's first fully-electric tram network in 1893, further growth of the urban area was enabled. Inner suburbs from this era typically have orderly streets (around planned subdivisions of former agriculture grants, often inspired by the City Beautiful movement) with shopfronts (the Hill Street Grocer franchise derives from the commercial legacy of a former tramway) and narrow lanes lined with timber and brick cottages, townhouses and small apartment buildings.

Social housing was usually organised by private societies and entities as outreach to those in need until crises brought greater attention from government authorities, such as the Homes Act (1919) and Housing Agreement (1945). The Housing Department focused mainly on mixing these with broad-acre suburban estates, which were sometimes expensive to service with adequate infrastructure. Architects such as Margaret Findlay were employed by the public works department. Bungalows were mass-produced in weatherboard and then fibro materials. The 1944 Town and Country Planning Act was the instrument to transfer control of urban housing to municipalities, which automatically resulted in tightly restricted homebuilding in existing urban areas. The advent of the automotive city and the 1965 Hobart Area Transportation Study (which ultimately resulted in cuts to public transport and parts of the inner city being converted into parking) further made Hobart a sprawling city. Zoning now applies and specific area plans can also be prepared (with the land use near Hobart's northern suburbs transit corridor under particular focus), though planning reform and new provisions schedules are being prepared. While community and social housing projects do occur in expensive areas (such as 25 apartments on Goulburn Street in 2021), it is still difficult to achieve approval.

As of 2024, Hobart is the least dense Australian capital with the highest costs per capita (alongside Sydney) for housing and car-ownership (19.7% cost-to-income in 2024). This is credited with contributing to the broader Tasmanian demographic crisis and emigration. The median house price of inner Hobart was A$1,026,500 in 2021, which would be 12.8x the region's median household income per year. Of the 76,686 total dwellings in urban Greater Hobart in 2021, only 10% were a flat or apartment and 7.2% semi-detached or terrace. Greater Hobart builds on average 700 new dwellings per year, which equates to between 3–3.5 per 1000 people (lower than the 6–9 of other states), mostly concentrated in outer suburbs like Bridgewater (which has the lowest life expectancy in Hobart at 67) which studies show can cost 8x more than infill, meaning they require more infrastructure per dwelling to service than areas closer to existing services (which are more often under-capacity). Rental vacancies have generally been on decline since about 2013 with the rate consistently under 3% and listings 50.5% lower in southern Tasmania over 11 years. Renting is also typically less protected than other states.

Tenant-oriented housing models may become more common, with a few examples in Hobart such as 2020's all-electric The Commons Hobart where expensive parking mandates were waivered to enable an affordable green lifestyle.

== Culture ==
Since the 2000s, Hobart has gained a reputation as a "cool" and creative cultural capital with increasing numbers of tourists drawn to its unconventional or quirky events and art projects, many spurred by the Museum of Old and New Art (MONA). The term "MONA effect" refers to the museum's significant impact on the local economy and Tasmanian tourism.

The city's nightlife is primarily concentrated in Salamanca Place, North Hobart, the waterfront area, Elizabeth Street (which includes the pedestrianised Elizabeth Street Mall) and Sandy Bay. These areas are home to popular dining strips, pubs, bars and nightclubs.

=== Theatre and entertainment ===
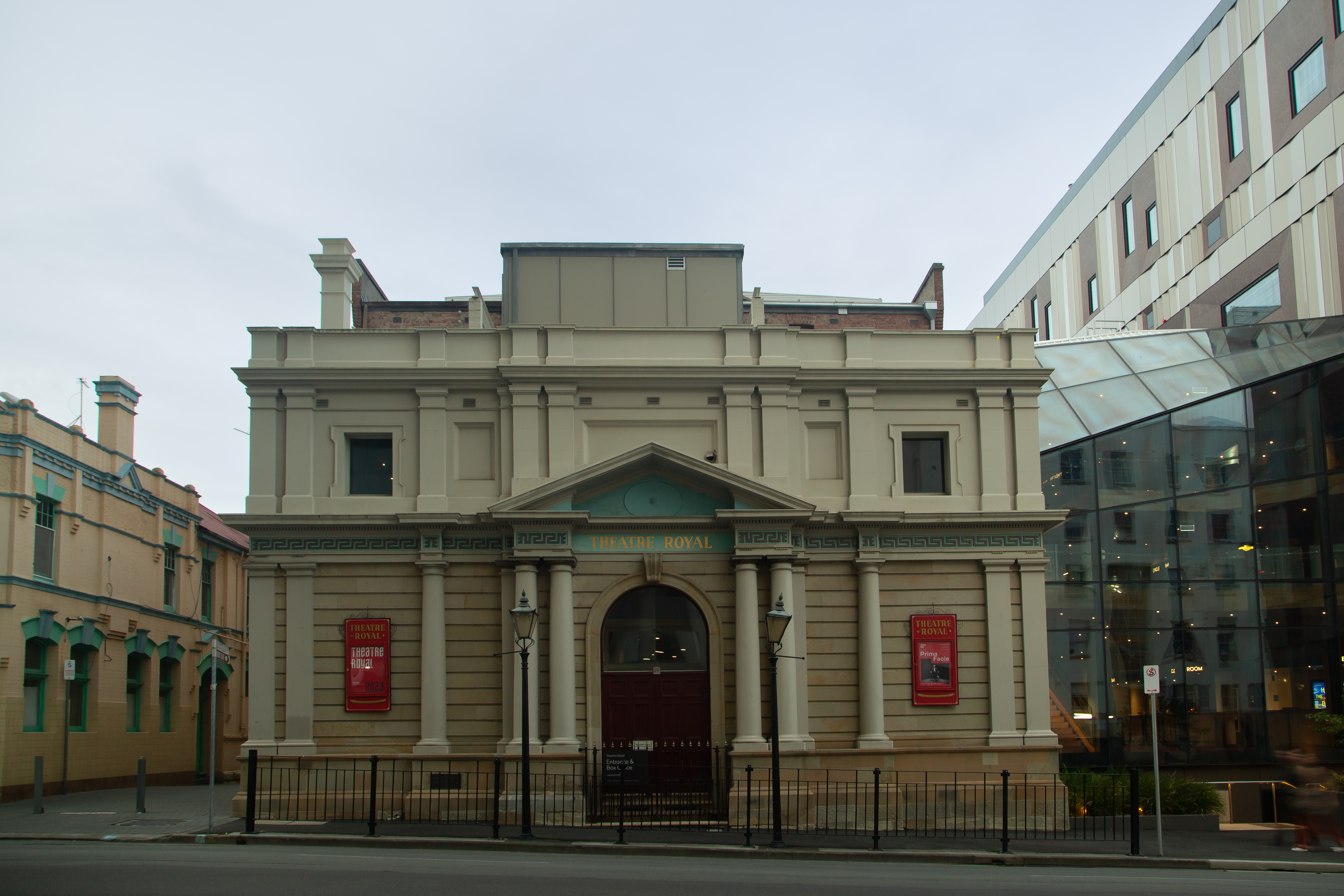
Established in 1837, Theatre Royal is Australia's oldest continually operating theatre.

The city centre is home to several theatres, including live theatre venues, picture palaces, and a multiplex operated by Village Cinemas.

The Theatre Royal, established in 1837, is Australia's oldest continually operating theatre, designed by colonial architect John Lee Archer. Another historic theatre is the Playhouse Theatre. Built in the 1860s, it was originally a chapel designed by Henry Bastow. Today, it is owned by the Hobart Repertory Theatre Society.

Hobart's largest arthouse cinema, the State Cinema in North Hobart, was established as the North Hobart Picture Palace in 1913. It was acquired by the Reading Cinemas chain in 2019. Located in New Town, the Rewind Cinema, formerly the Hidden Theatre, is housed in a 19th-century convict-built structure.

Another popular live entertainment location is the Hanging Garden precinct, which contains several venues and hosts Dark Mofo and Hobart Festival of Comedy events.

=== Galleries and museums ===
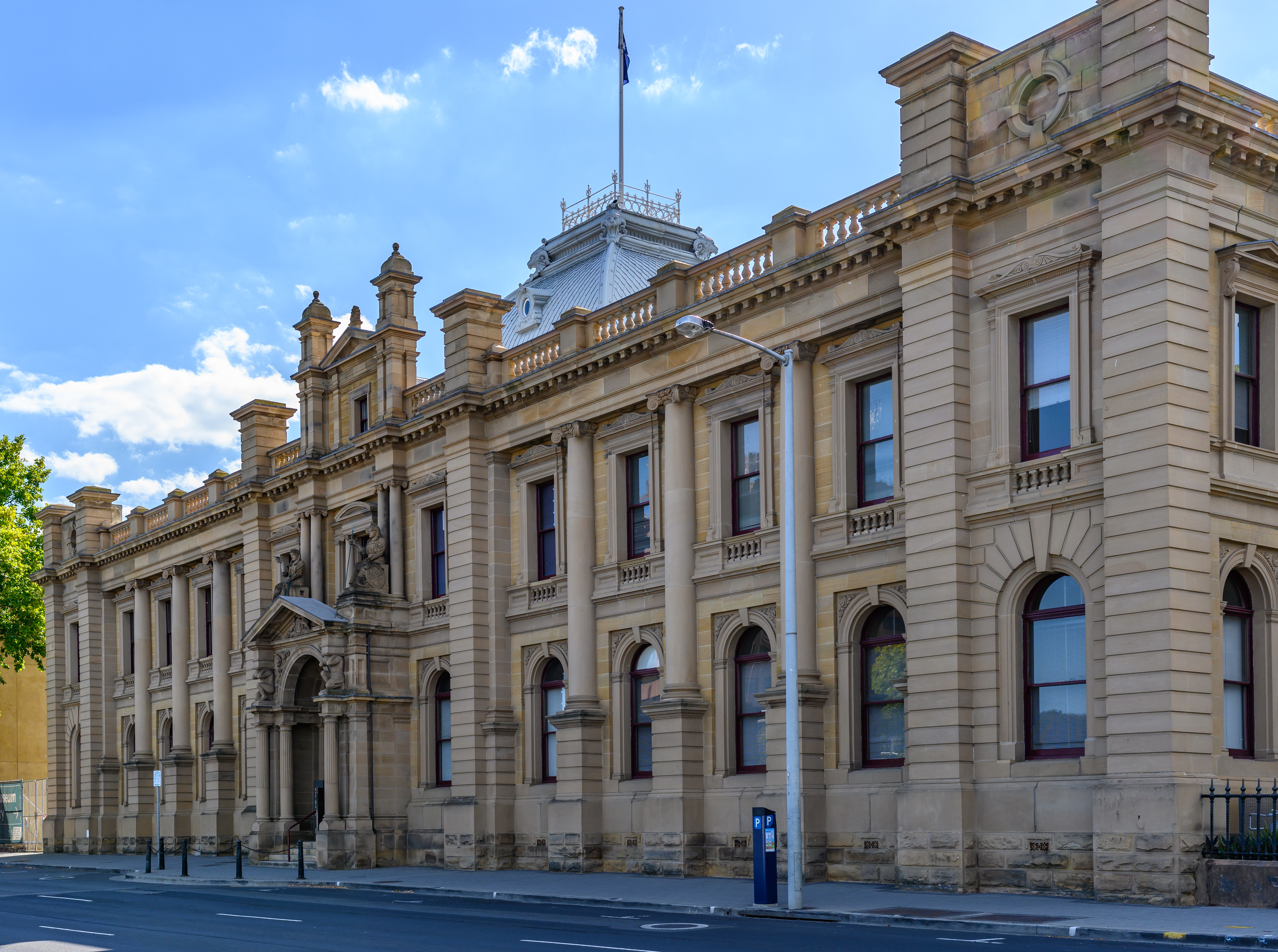
Tasmanian Museum and Art Gallery

Australia's first privately funded museum, the Lady Franklin Gallery, was established in Acanthe Park by Lady Jane Franklin in 1843 and is now run by The Art Society of Tasmania. Three years later, the Royal Society of Tasmania (the oldest Royal Society outside England) founded the Tasmanian Museum and Art Gallery (TMAG). Its first permanent home opened in 1863 and the museum has gradually expanded to occupy several surrounding buildings, including the Commisariat Store, built in 1810. The TMAG-run Narryna was founded in 1955 as the Van Diemen's Land Memorial Folk Museum and is housed within an 1830s Georgian town house. Maritime Museum Tasmania is located near TMAG on the waterfront and has been in operation since 1974.

The Museum of Old and New Art (MONA) opened in 2011 to coincide with the third annual MONA FOMA festival. Located within the Moorilla winery on the Berriedale peninsula, the multi-storey MONA gallery houses the collection of David Walsh and is the Southern Hemisphere's largest privately owned museum.

=== Literature ===
The first book of general Australian literature was published in Hobart. Titled The Last and Worst of the Bushrangers of Van Diemen's Land, it was printed by convict Andrew Bent and details the life and crimes of Michael Howe, the bushranger and outlaw. In 1824, Bent, as proprietor of the Hobart Town Gazette, established the first free press in Australia. The first Australian novel, Quintus Servinton, was written in 1831 by convict Henry Savery and published in Hobart. Written during his imprisonment, it is a semi-autobiographical work about the life of a convict in Van Diemen's Land. Mary Leman Grimstone, whose book Woman's Love was written in Hobart between 1826 and 1829, holds the distinction of being the author of the first non-biographical Australian novel. It was printed in London in 1832.

The State Library of Tasmania is located in the city centre and comprises the Allport Library and Museum of Fine Arts, which houses an extensive collection of colonial works and artefacts. In 2023, Hobart became a UNESCO City of Literature.

=== Music ===
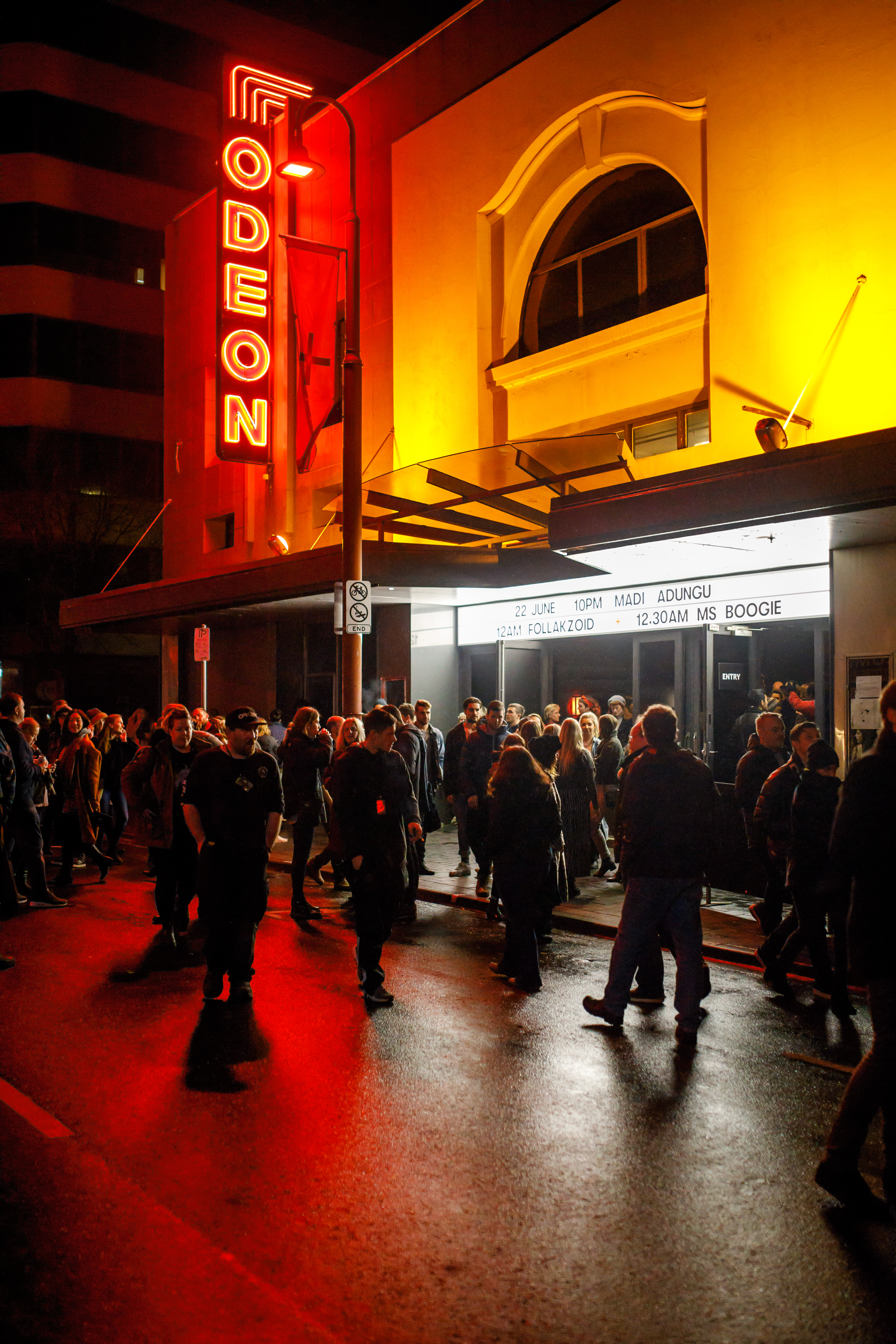
Odeon Theatre, a popular live music venue

The Tasmanian Symphony Orchestra is based at the Federation Concert Hall on the city's waterfront. The Federation Concert Hall also hosts the University of Tasmania's Australian International Symphony Orchestra Institute (AISOI) which fosters advanced young musicians from across Australia and internationally. Other live music venues in Hobart include Odeon Theatre, Avalon Theatre and Hobart City Hall. Major national and international music events are usually held at MyState Bank Arena, or the Tasman Room at Wrest Point Hotel Casino.

The city's music scene has given rise to internationally acclaimed acts working in a variety of genres, including Striborg and Psycroptic (metal), The Paradise Motel (chamber pop), Sea Scouts (noise rock), and Monique Brumby (indie pop). Other Hobart musicians have co-founded successful mainland Australian bands, including singer-songwriters Sacha Lucashenko (of The Morning After Girls) and Michael Noga (of The Drones), and multi-instrumentalist Monika Fikerle (of Love of Diagrams). Theremin player Miles Brown, blues guitarist Phil Manning (of blues-rock band Chain), and TikTok artist Kim Dracula all originated in Hobart. In addition, founding member of Violent Femmes, Brian Ritchie, now calls Hobart home, and curated the annual international arts festival MONA FOMA. Chloe Alison Escott is from Hobart, and founded The Native Cats with Julian Teakle.

=== Events ===
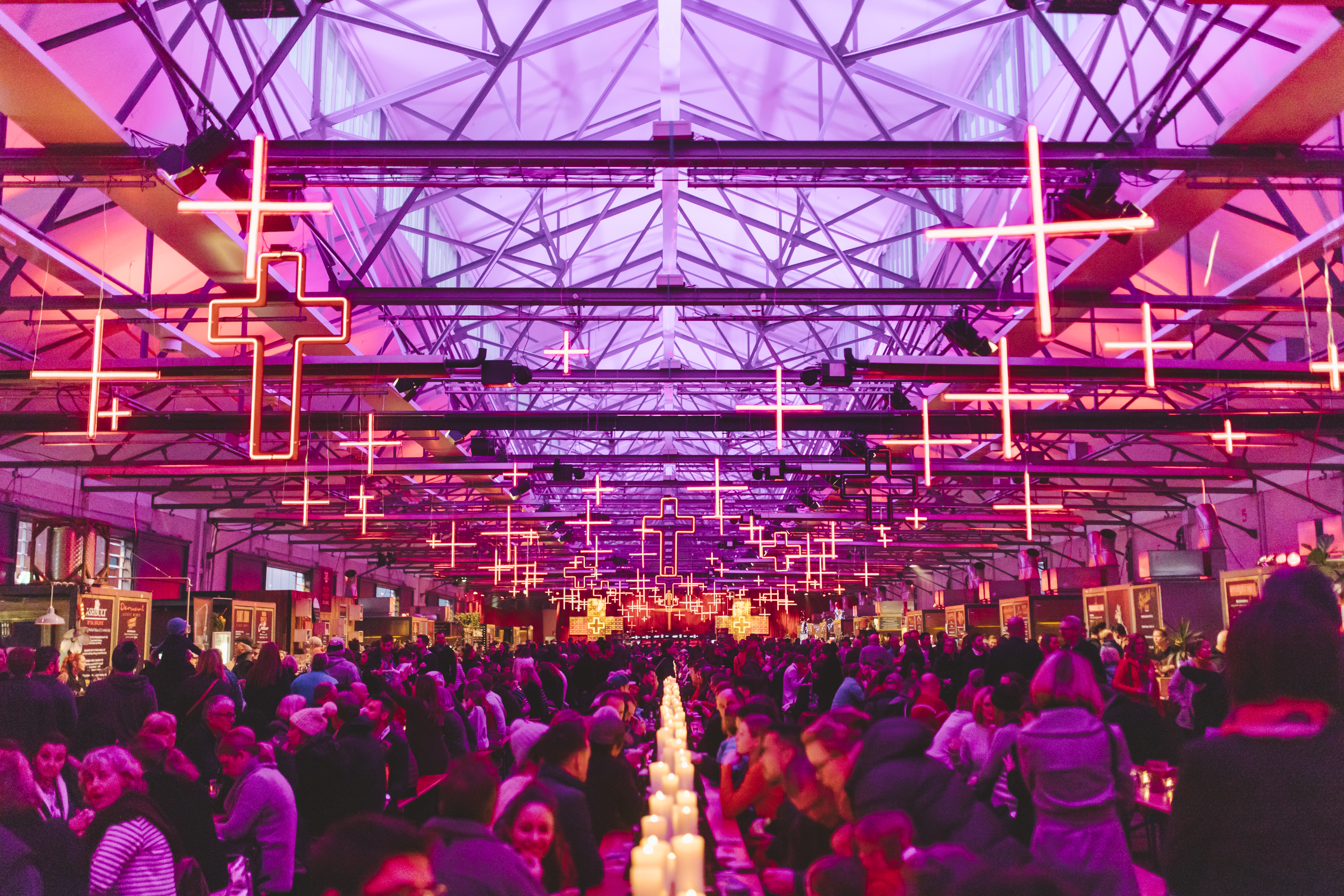
Winter Feast during the Dark Mofo arts and music festival

Hobart's recurring events consist of weekly markets, most notably Salamanca Market. The city also hosts festivals including Taste of Tasmania, which celebrates local produce, wine and music; Dark Mofo which is the city's biggest winter festival leading into the solstice featuring the Winter Feast; and Tasmania's biennial international arts festival Ten Days on the Island. Other festivals, including the Southern Roots Festival and the Falls Festival in Marion Bay, also capitalise on Hobart's artistic communities.

The Australian Wooden Boat Festival is a biennial event held in Hobart celebrating wooden boats. It is held concurrently with the Royal Hobart Regatta, which began in 1830 and is therefore Tasmania's oldest surviving sporting event. The Sandy Bay Regatta began in 1849. In October is Hobart Show Day where agriculture is showcased at the Hobart Showground in Glenorchy.

Sustainable Living Tasmania has hosted events in Hobart focused on environmental sustainability, such as their Sustainable Living Festivals, since the 1970s.

=== Sport ===
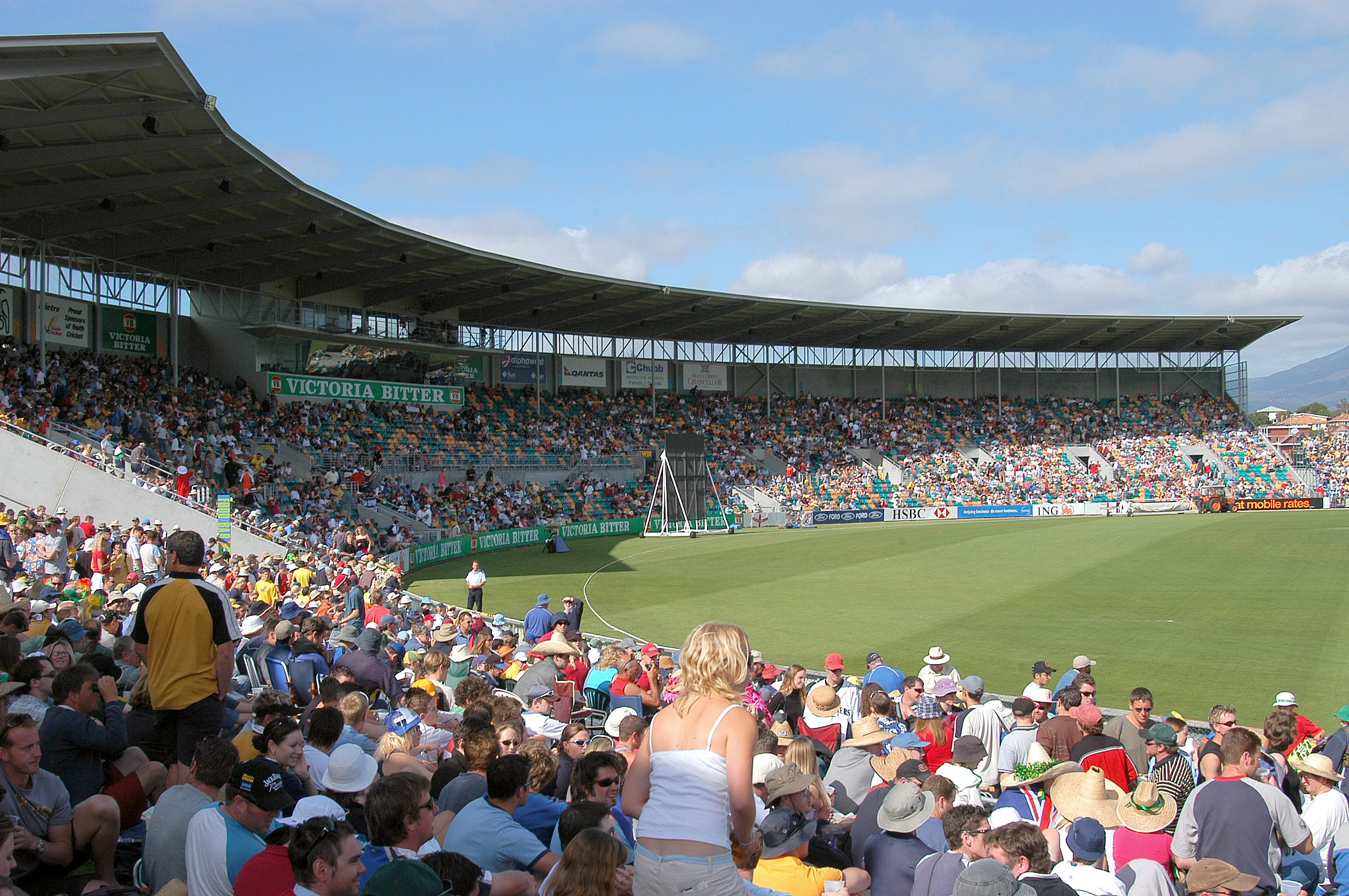
Bellerive Oval hosts cricket and Australian rules football, Hobart's two most popular spectator sports.

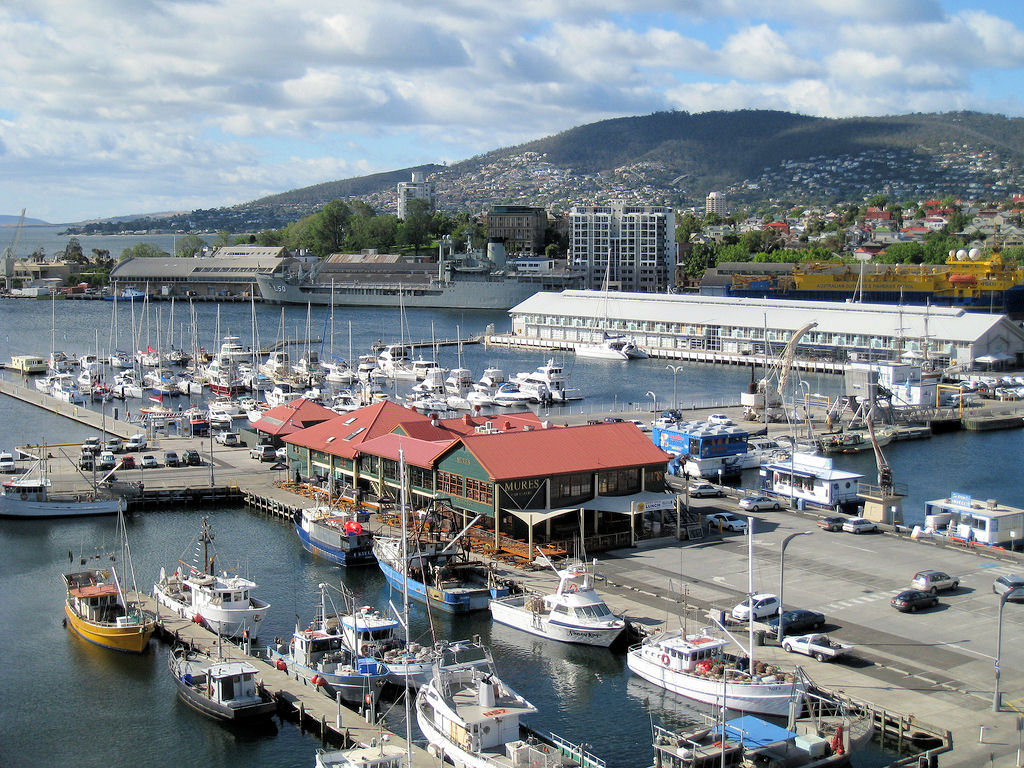
Hobart's Constitution Dock is the arrival point for yachts after they have completed the Sydney to Hobart Yacht Race and is a scene of celebration during the new year festivities

Most professional Hobart-based sports teams represent Tasmania as a whole rather than exclusively the city.

Cricket is a popular sport in Hobart. The Tasmanian Tigers cricket team plays its home games at Bellerive Oval on the Eastern Shore, and the Hobart Hurricanes compete in the Big Bash League.

Australian rules football was introduced to Hobart in the 1860s and has long been the city's most popular spectator sport. Founded in 1879 and headquartered at Hobart, the Tasmanian Football League features four Hobart-based clubs: Clarence, Glenorchy, Lauderdale and North Hobart. Hobart-based teams also play in the Southern Football League. Hobart has hosted Australian Football League (AFL) matches since 1952, and in 2023, Tasmania was awarded a conditional license to field the league's 19th AFL team, nicknamed the Tasmanian Devils. The conditional license is contingent on a 23,000 seat roofed stadium being built at Hobart's Macquarie Point. It is anticipated that the men's team will join the AFL by 2028.

Tasmania is not represented by teams in the National Rugby League (rugby league), nor the Super Rugby (rugby union), Super Netball (netball) and A-League (soccer) competitions. However, the Tasmania JackJumpers entered the National Basketball League in 2021. the Tasmania Jewels entered the Women's National Basketball League in 2026. The Hobart Chargers also represent Hobart in the second-tier NBL1 South.

The Tassie Tigers field men's and women's representative sides in Hockey One, which replaced the Australian Hockey League in 2019. They play their home matches at the Tasmanian Hockey Centre, which has also hosted international competition matches, such as the Men's FIH Pro League.

The Hobart International is an annual tennis tournament held since 1994. The city is the finishing point of the Targa Tasmania rally car event, which has been held annually in April since 1991.

Hobart is internationally famous among the yachting community as the finish of the Sydney to Hobart Yacht Race which starts in Sydney on Boxing Day. The arrival of the yachts is celebrated as part of the Hobart Summer Festival, a food and wine festival beginning just after Christmas and ending in mid-January.

In 2022 Tasmania made a bid to host the 2026 Commonwealth Games in Hobart, but lost out to regional Victoria (which later ceded the hosting rights to Glasgow).

Active sports teams in Hobart
Club	League	Sport	Venue	Established
Tasmania Football Club	AFL/AFLW/VFL/VFLW	Australian rules football	Ninja Stadium/Macquarie Point Stadium/Kingston Twin Ovals/North Hobart Oval	2023
Tasmania JackJumpers	NBL	Basketball	MyState Bank Arena	2020
Hobart Hurricanes	BBL	Cricket	Ninja Stadium	2011
Hobart Hurricanes Women	WBBL	Cricket	Ninja Stadium	2015
Tasmania Men	Sheffield Shield	Cricket	Ninja Stadium	1851
Tasmania Women	WNCL	Cricket	Ninja Stadium	1906
Hobart Chargers	NBL1 South	Basketball	The Hutchins School	1981
Tasmania Rugby Union Team	Australian Rugby Shield	Rugby Union	Rugby Park	1949
Tasmania Rugby League Team	Affiliated States Championship	Rugby League	North Hobart Oval	1953
Tasmania Wild	Super Netball Reserves	Netball	Hobart Netball and Sports Centre/Kingborough Sports Centre	2022
Tassie Tigers	Hockey One	Field hockey	Tasmanian Hockey Centre	1991
Tasmania Devils Academy	Talent League Boy/Talent League Girls	Australian rules football	Ninja Stadium/North Hobart Oval	2018
Tasmania Jewels	WNBL	Basketball	MyState Bank Arena	2025
South Hobart FC	Australian Championship	Soccer	D'Arcy Street	1910

=== Media ===
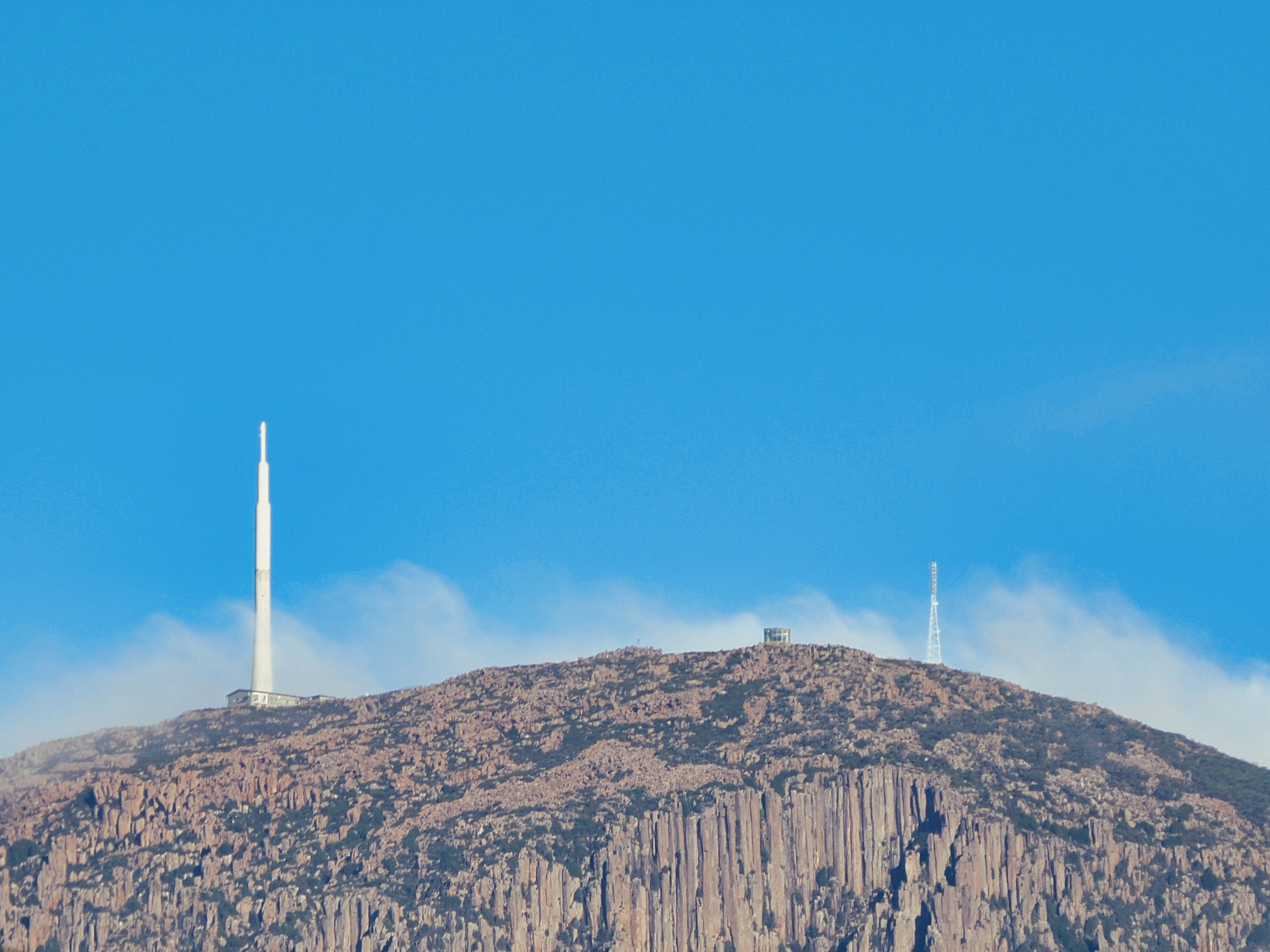
The 130 m (430 ft) tall television and radio transmitter of Hobart is to the left over the Organ Pipes of kunanyi / Mt Wellington

Station	Frequency	
Energy FM	87.8 FM	Commercial
Triple J	92.9 FM	Government funded
ABC Classic	93.9 FM	Government funded
Hobart FM	96.1 FM	Community
Edge Radio	99.3 FM	Community
hit100.9 Hobart	100.9 FM	Commercial
7HO FM	101.7 FM	Commercial
SBS Radio	105.7 FM	Government funded
Ultra106five	106.5 FM	Christian/narrowcast
Triple M Hobart	107.3 FM	Commercial
ABC Radio National	585 AM	Government funded
ABC NewsRadio	747 AM	Government funded
7RPH	864 AM	Community
936 ABC Hobart	936 AM	Government funded
TOTE Sport Radio	1080 AM	Racing/narrowcast
Rete Italia	1611 AM	Italian radio
NTC Radio Australia	1620 AM	Community

Five free-to-air television stations service Hobart:

- ABC Tasmania (ABT)
- SBS Tasmania (SBS)
- Seven Tasmania (TNT)
- Nine Tasmania (TVT) – Nine Network affiliate
- Tasmanian Digital Television (TDT) – Network 10 affiliate

Each station broadcasts a primary channel and several multichannels.

Hobart is served by twenty–eight digital free-to-air television channels:

1. ABC
2. ABC HD (ABC broadcast in HD)
3. ABC Family
4. ABC Kids
5. ABC Entertains
6. ABC News
7. SBS
8. SBS HD (SBS broadcast in HD)
9. SBS2 (SBS 2 broadcast in HD)
10. SBS Food
11. NITV
12. SBS WorldWatch
13. SBS World Movies
14. 7 Tasmania (on relay from Melbourne)
15. 7HD (Seven broadcast in HD)
16. 7two
17. 7mate
18. 9HD (Nine broadcast in HD)
19. 9Gem
20. 9Go!
21. 9Life
22. TVSN
23. Gold
24. 10 (on relay from Melbourne)
25. 10 HD (TDT broadcast in HD)
26. 10 Drama
27. 10 Comedy
28. Nickelodeon

The majority of pay television services are provided by Foxtel via satellite, although other smaller pay television providers do service Hobart.

Commercial radio stations licensed to cover the Hobart market include Triple M Hobart, hit100.9 Hobart and 7HO FM. Local community radio stations include Christian radio station Ultra106five, Edge Radio and Hobart FM which targets the wider community with specialist programs. The five ABC radio networks available on analogue radio broadcast to Hobart via 936 ABC Hobart, Radio National, Triple J, NewsRadio and ABC Classic.

Hobart's major newspaper is The Mercury, which was founded by John Davies in 1854 and has been continually published ever since. The paper is owned and operated by Rupert Murdoch's News Limited. Pulse Tasmania, formerly Pulse Hobart, started as a radio station in Hobart and focuses mainly on short-form news media on its website.

== Demographics ==
At the 2021 census, there were 247,068 people in the Greater Hobart. The City of Hobart local government area had a population of 55,077.

As of 2021, the median weekly household income was $1,542, compared with $1,746 nationally.

18.1% of households total weekly income is less than $650 week, while 18.9% of households weekly income exceeds $3,000. This compares to national rates of 16.5% and 24.3% respectively.

35.4% of renting households, and 10.3% of owned households with a mortgage experience housing stress, where rent or mortgage repayments exceed 30% of income.

At the 2016 census, The most common occupation categories were professionals (22.6%), clerical and administrative workers (14.7%), technicians and trades workers (13.3%), community and personal service workers (12.8%), and managers (11.3%).

=== Ancestry and immigration ===
Country of birth (2021)
Birthplace (Note: In accordance with the Australian Bureau of Statistics source, England, Scotland, Mainland China and the Special Administrative Regions of Hong Kong and Macau are listed separately.)	Population
Australia	189,218
England	8,155
Mainland China	5,544
Nepal	4,107
India	4,074
New Zealand	2,108
Philippines	1,165

4.5% of the population (11,216 people) are Indigenous Australians (Aboriginal Australians and Torres Strait Islanders). (Note: Of any ancestry. Includes those identifying as Aboriginal Australians or Torres Strait Islanders. Indigenous identification is separate to the ancestry question on the Australian Census and persons identifying as Aboriginal or Torres Strait Islander may identify any ancestry.)

At the 2021 census, the most commonly nominated ancestry groups include:

- English (42.5%)
- Australian (37.6%) (Note: The Australian Bureau of Statistics has stated that most who nominate "Australian" as their ancestry are part of the Anglo-Celtic group.)
- Irish (10.7%)
- Scottish (9.4%)
- Aboriginal (4.1%) (Note: Of any ancestry. Includes those identifying as Aboriginal Australians or Torres Strait Islanders. Indigenous identification is separate to the ancestry question on the Australian Census and persons identifying as Aboriginal or Torres Strait Islander may identify any ancestry.)
- German (3.7%)
- Chinese (3.7%)
- Dutch (2%)
- Italian (1.9%)
- Nepalese (1.8%)

23.4% of the population was born overseas at the 2021 census. The five largest groups of overseas-born were from England (3.3%), Mainland China (2.2%), Nepal (1.7%), India (1.6%) and New Zealand (0.9%).

=== Language ===
At the 2021 census, 82.6% of the population spoke only English at home. The other languages most commonly spoken at home were Mandarin (2.6%), Nepali (1.8%), Punjabi (0.7%), Cantonese (0.5%) and Vietnamese (0.4%).

=== Religion ===
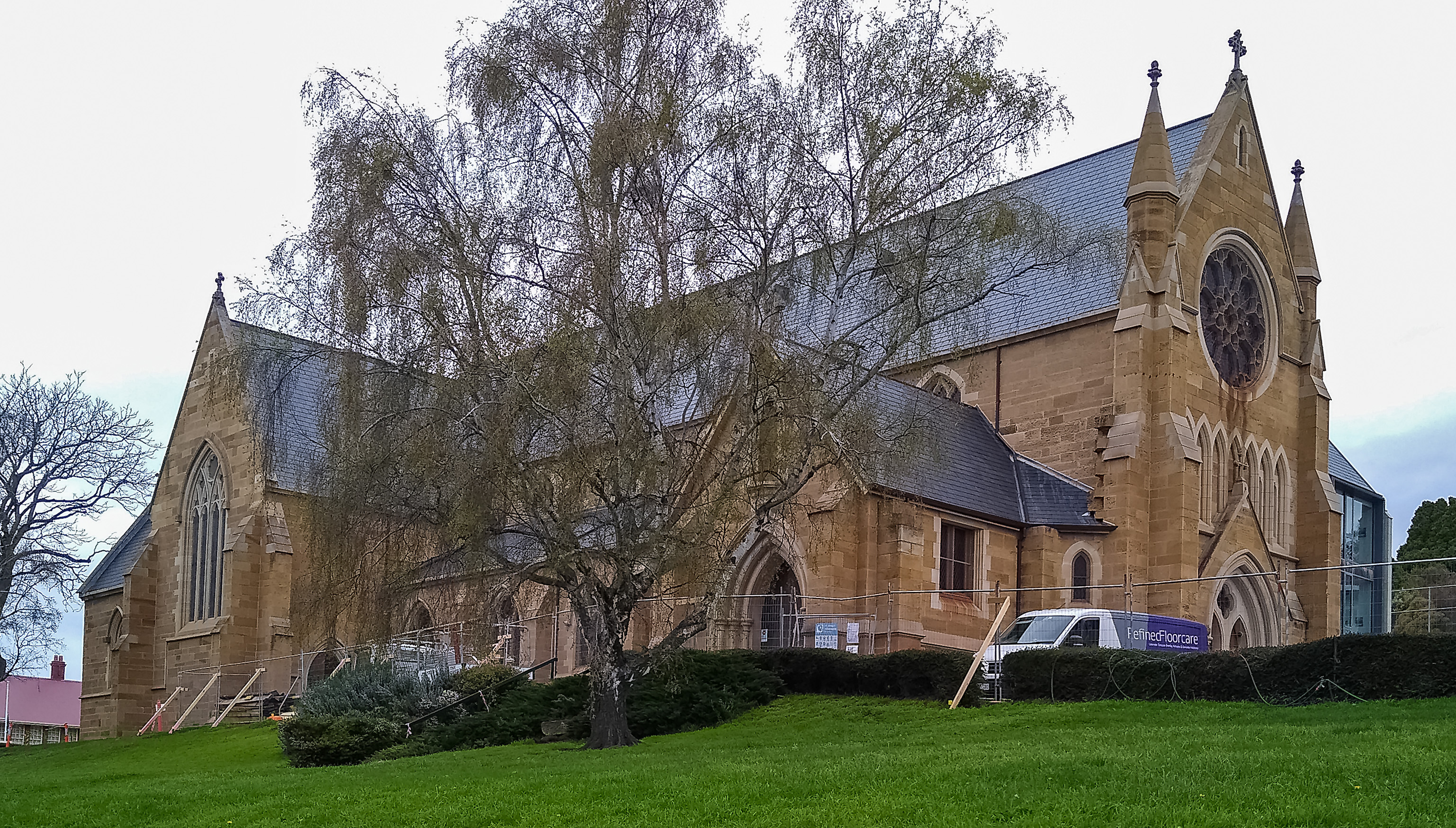
St Mary's Catholic Cathedral

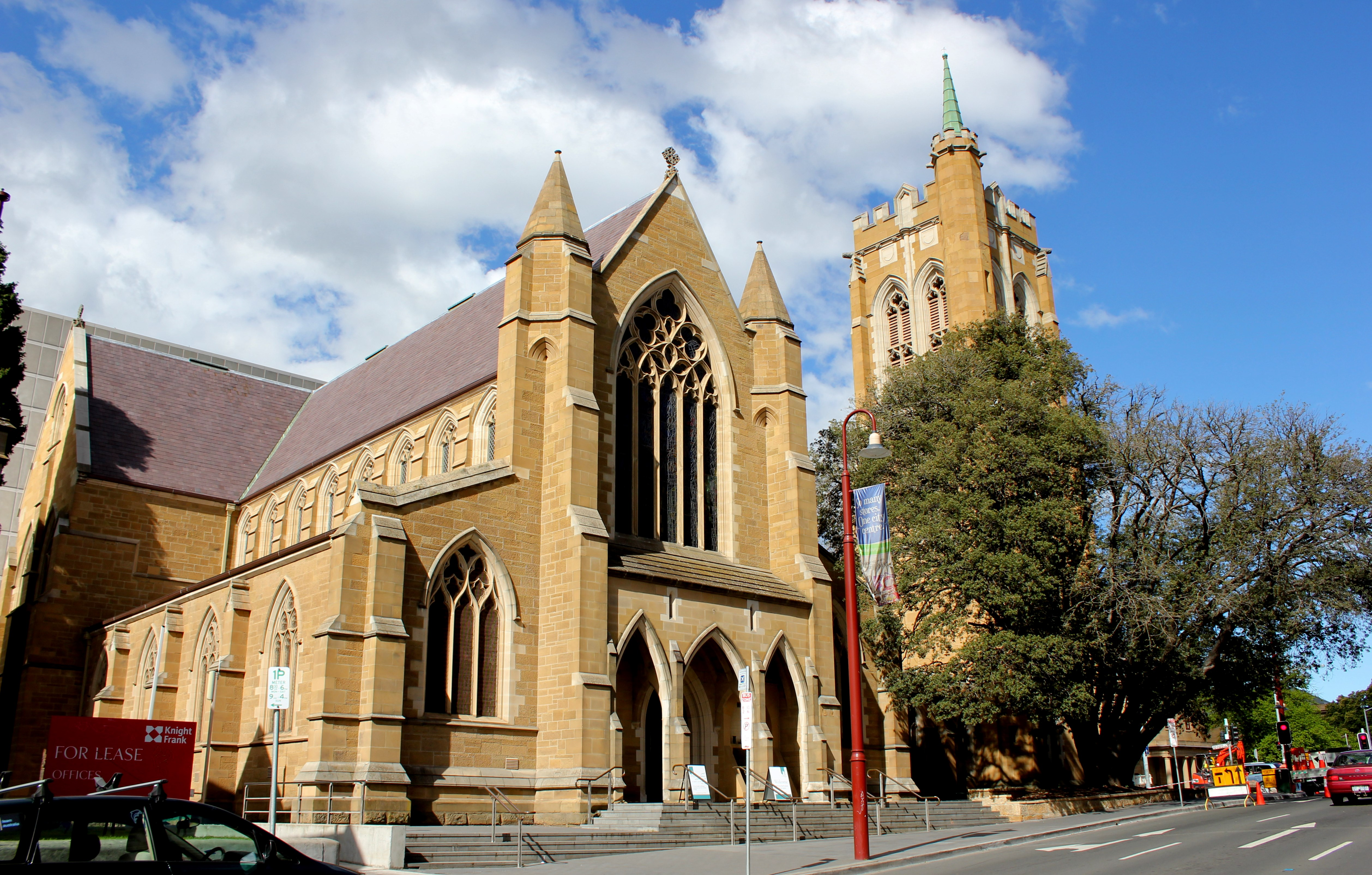
St David's Cathedral

In the 2021 census, 49.9% of Greater Hobart residents specified no religion. Christianity comprised the largest religious affiliation (37.1%), with the largest denominations being Anglicanism (14.1%) and Catholicism (14.1%). Hinduism (2.6%), Buddhism (1.3%), Islam (1.3%) and Sikhism (0.6%) constitute the remaining largest religious affiliations.

Hobart has a small community of 456 members of the Church of Jesus Christ of Latter-day Saints, with meetinghouses in Glenorchy, Rosny, and Glen Huon. There is also a synagogue, with a Jewish community of 203 people. Hobart has a Baháʼí community, with a Baháʼí Centre of Learning, located within the city. In 2013, Hillsong Church established a Hillsong Connect campus in Hobart.

== Economy ==
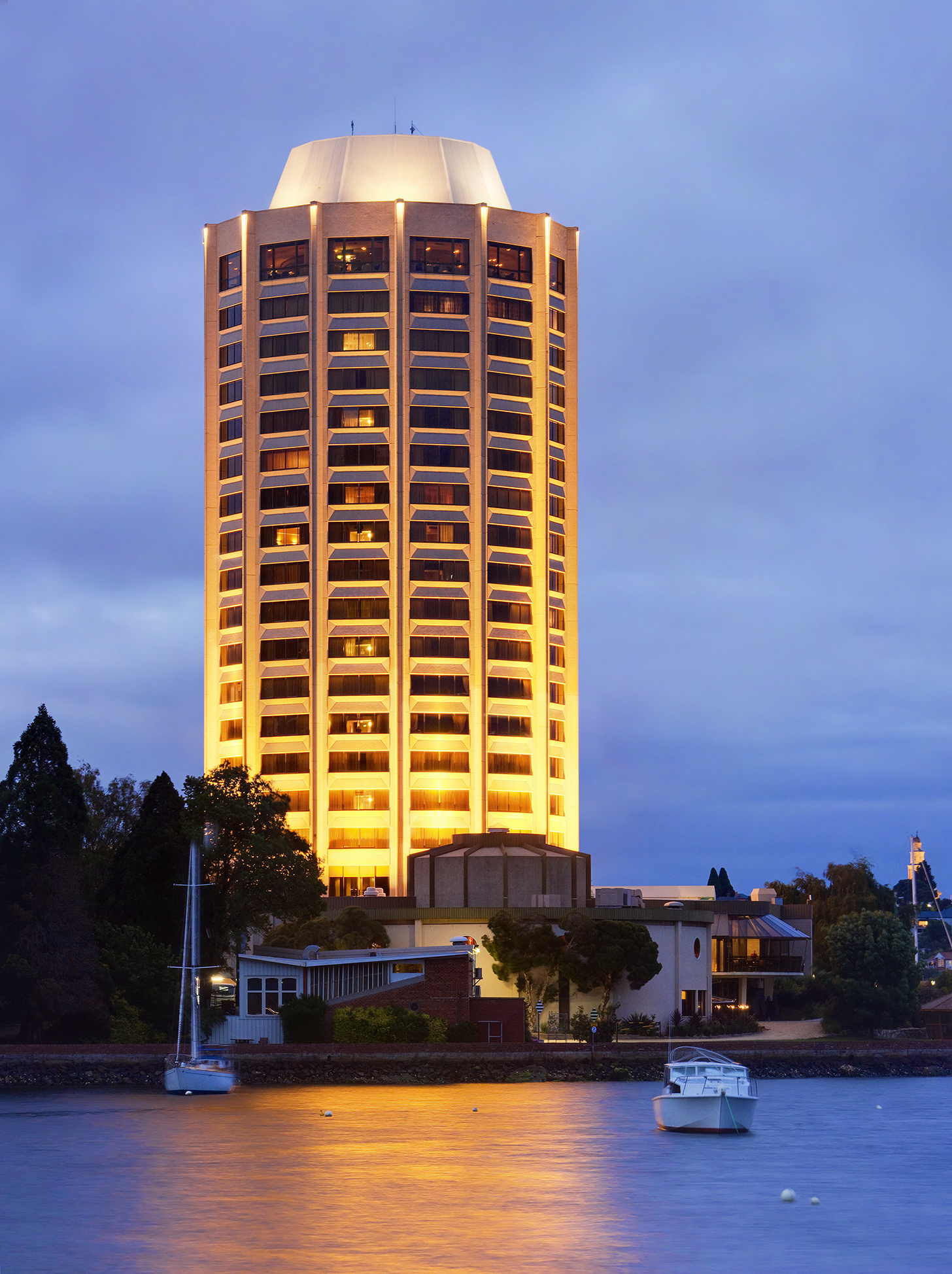
Designed by Roy Grounds, the 17-storey Wrest Point Hotel Casino in Sandy Bay, opened as Australia's first legal casino in 1973.

In 2021, Greater Hobart's main occupations were professionals and service workers, trades, administration and management and other labour professions working in industries such as healthcare, the public service, and supermarkets and small businesses. Incomes are higher than the rest of Tasmania, but lower than the Australian median. These employment areas are reflected by the gross value added provided by industries, which is greatest among the "healthcare and social assistance (17%), public administration and safety (11%), and financial and insurance services (10%)." Healthcare is also the fastest-growing, while services and construction have the highest business count. The vast majority of this economic production is concentrated in the City of Hobart area, except manufacturing which is higher in Glenorchy City.

Major shopping areas include the Elizabeth Street Mall (the only fully pedestrianised block in the city), which is connected with the Cat and Fiddle Arcade, Centrepoint and Liverpool Street in the CBD, Mayfair Shopping Plaza on Sandy Bay Road, New Town Plaza, Moonah Central (near a foodmarket), Northgate Shopping Centre and Centro in Glenorchy, Claremont Plaza, Eastlands Shopping Centre (Tasmania's biggest) in Rosny Park, Lindisfarne village, Shoreline Plaza in Howrah, Glebe Hill Village Shopping Centre, Cambridge Homemaker Centre by the airport, Gateway Shopping Centre and Sorell Plaza in Sorell, Green Point Plaza and Covehill Fair Shopping Centre in Bridgewater, New Norfolk, and Channel Court and Kingston Town Shopping Centre in Kingston.

Shipping is significant to the city's economy. The city is a popular cruise ship destination during the summer months, with 47 such ships docking during the course of the 2016–17 summer season, and $34.5 million in direct expenditure in 2017 (an average spend of $172 per passenger).

Tourism is a significant part of the economy, with visitors coming to the city to explore its historic inner suburbs and nationally acclaimed restaurants and cafes, as well as its vibrant music and nightlife culture. The two major draw-cards are the weekly market in Salamanca Place, and the Museum of Old & New Art. The city is also used as a base from which to explore the rest of Tasmania.

The city also supports many other industries. Major local employers include the Boyer Mill, Incat, Cadbury's, Cascade Brewery, Risdon Zinc Works and Wrest Point Casino. The city also supports a host of light industry manufacturers, as well as a range of redevelopment projects, including the $689 million Royal Hobart Hospital Redevelopment – standing as the states largest ever Health Infrastructure project.

The last 15–20 years have seen many vineyards develop in countryside areas outside Hobart, including the Coal River Wine Region and D'Entrecasteaux Channel, with Moorilla Estate at Berriedale being one of the most awarded vineyards in Australia.

=== Antarctic gateway ===
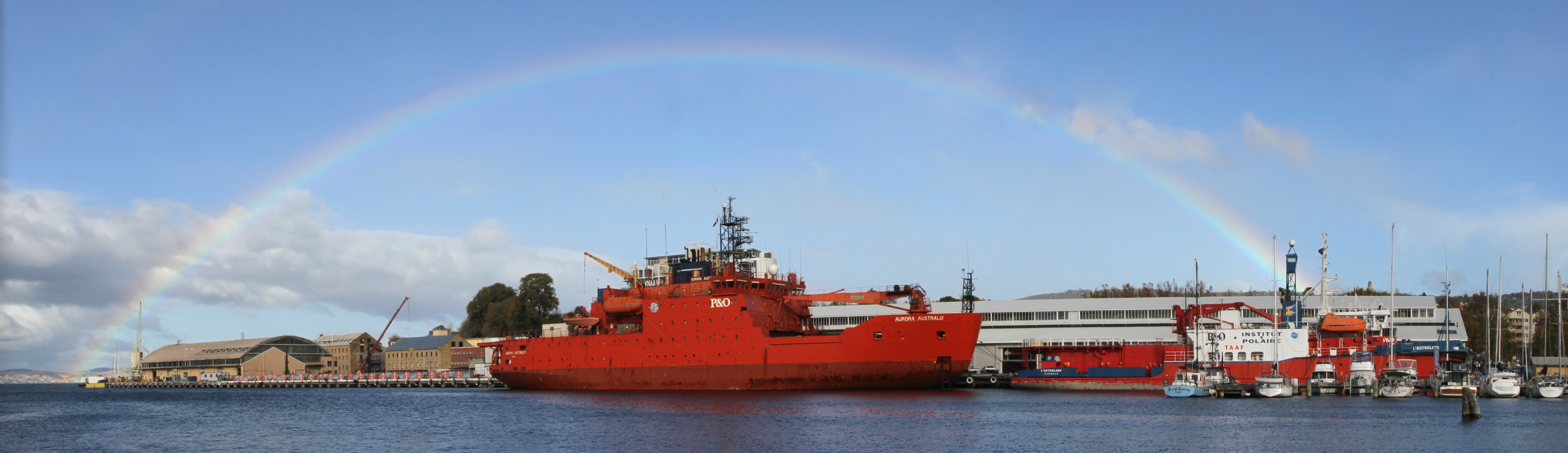
The icebreakers Aurora Australis and L'Astrolabe berthed in Hobart

Hobart is an Antarctic gateway city, with geographical proximity to East Antarctica and the Southern Ocean. Infrastructure is provided by the port of Hobart for scientific research and cruise ships, and Hobart Airport supports an Antarctic Airlink to Wilkins Runway at Casey Station. Hobart is a logistics point for the Australian vessel Nuyina and French icebreaker L'Astrolabe.

Hobart is the home port for the Australian and French Antarctic programs, and provides port services for other visiting Antarctic nations and Antarctic cruise ships. Antarctic and Southern Ocean expeditions are supported by a specialist cluster offering cold climate products, services and scientific expertise. The majority of these businesses and organisations are members of the Tasmanian polar network, supported in part by the Tasmanian State Government.

Tasmania has a high concentration of Antarctic and Southern Ocean scientists. Hobart is home to the following Antarctic and Southern Ocean scientific institutions:

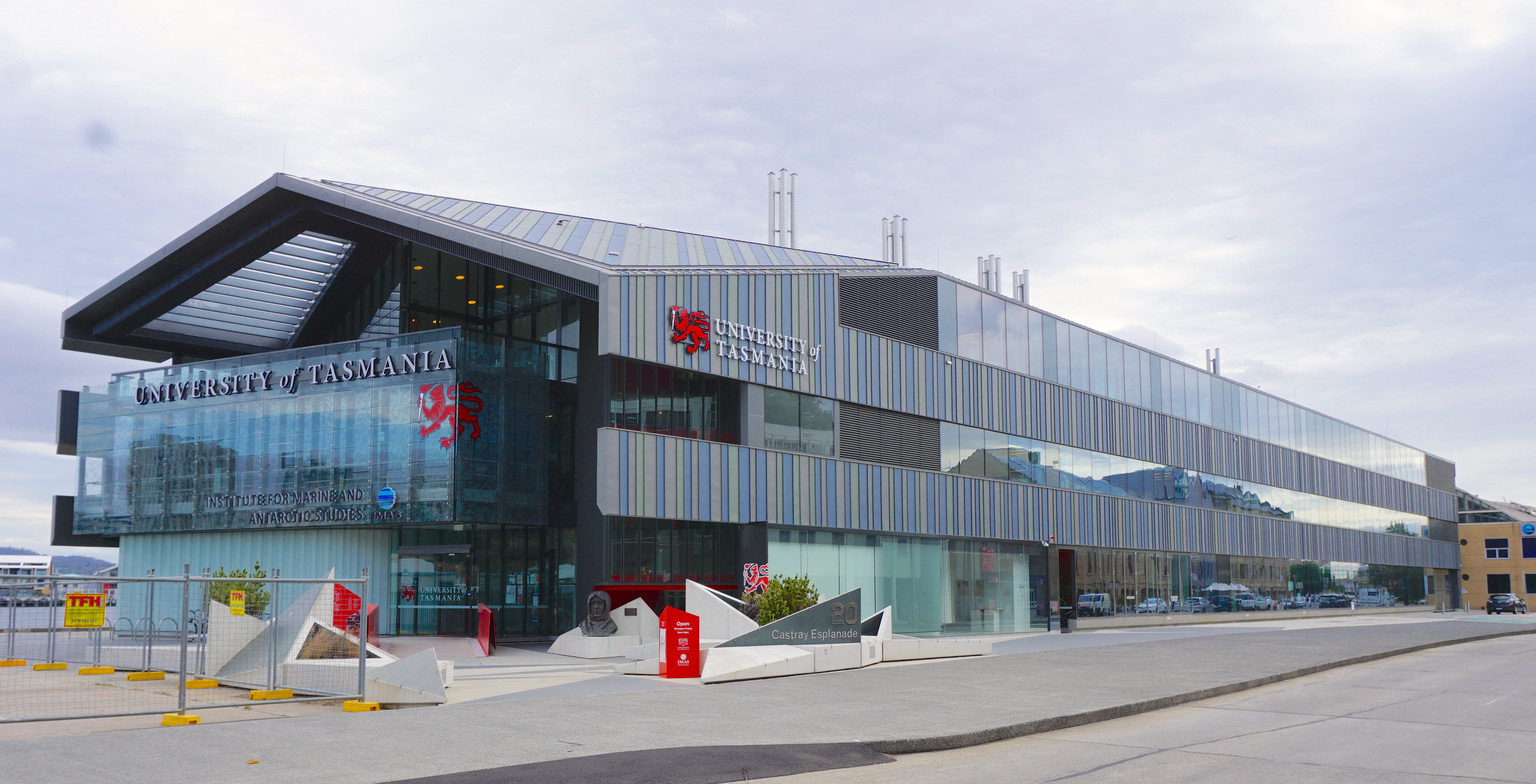
The Institute for Marine and Antarctic Studies at Salamanca Wharf

- Australian Antarctic Division
- Commission for the Conservation of Antarctic Marine Living Resources (CCAMLR)
- Agreement on the Conservation of Albatrosses and Petrels (ACAP)
- The University of Tasmania (UTAS) – expertise in Antarctic and Southern Ocean science and research
- Institute for Marine and Antarctic Studies (IMAS) (established by UTAS)
- Integrated Marine Observing System (IMOS)
- Antarctic Climate and Ecosystems Cooperative Research Centre (ACE-CRC)
- International Antarctic Institute (IAI) (hosted by UTAS)
- Southern Ocean Observing System (hosted by UTAS/ IMAS)
- CSIRO Marine and Atmospheric Research

=== Tourism ===
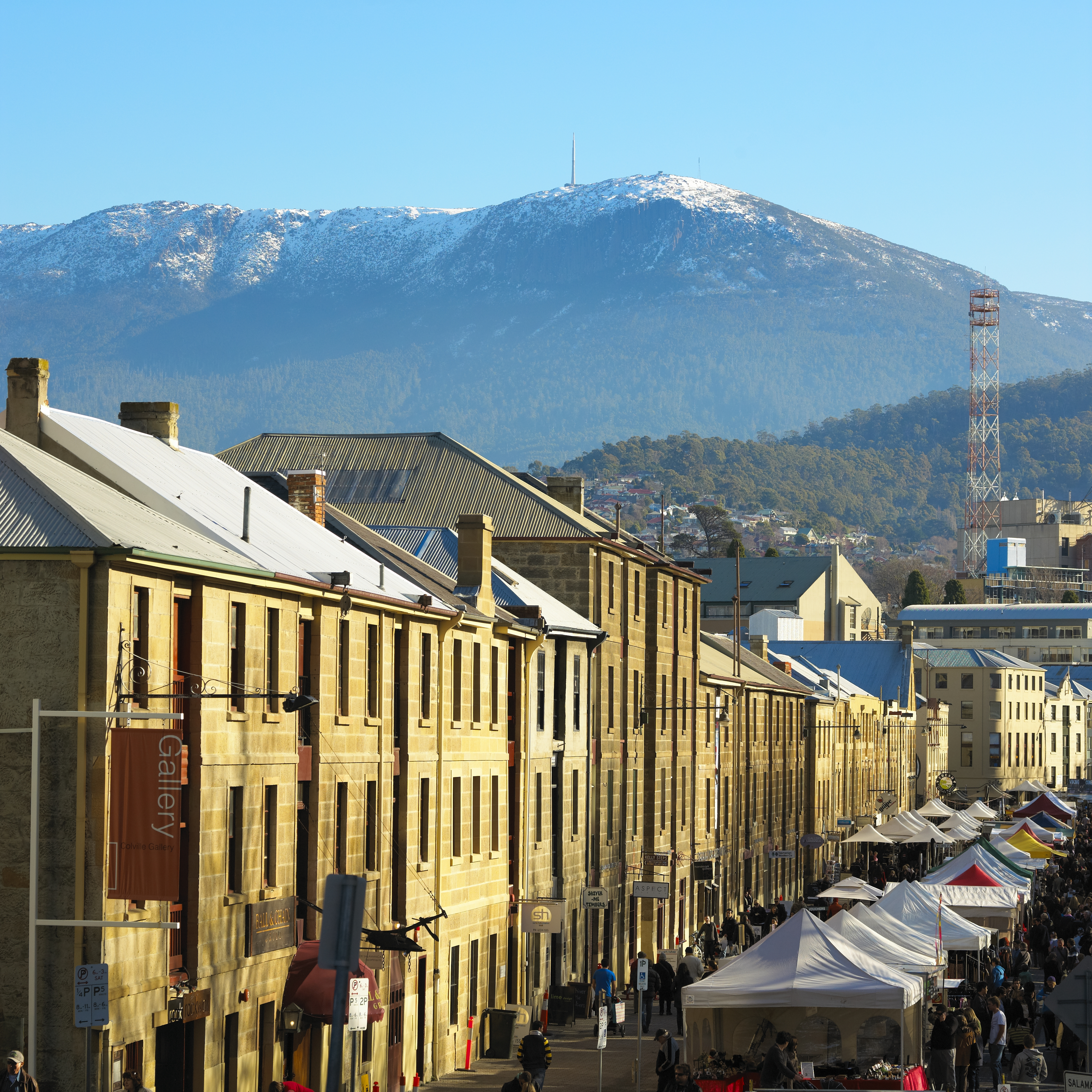
Salamanca Market with the snow-capped Mount Wellington in the background

The MONA Effect is a term for the significant influence of the Museum of New and Old Art (MONA), the Southern Hemisphere's largest private museum, on the local tourist econoy, comparable to the effect of the Guggenheim Museum on Bilbao. Since opening in 2011, MONA had received 2.5 million visitors by 2022 and has helped establish a number of art and food venues and events, including MONA FOMA, and the winter festivals of Mid-Winter Fest and Dark Mofo. 27% of visitors to Tasmania visit the museum.

In 2016, Hobart received 1.8 million visitors, surpassing both Perth and Canberra, tying equally with Brisbane. Visitor numbers reached a low of 744,200 in 2021, primarily as a result of the COVID-19 pandemic, with expectations that numbers would return to normal by 2023.

Hobart has nationally known restaurants, boutique alcohol producers, including Sullivans Cove Whiskey, which won world's best single malt in 2014. Other significant tourist attractions include Australia's second oldest botanic gardens, the Royal Tasmanian Botanical Gardens, which holds extensive significant plant collections, a range of public and private museums including the Tasmanian Museum & Art Gallery and Maritime Museum Tasmania, and Mount Wellington, one of the dominant features of Hobart's skyline. At 1,271 metres (4,170 ft), the mountain has its own ecosystems, is rich in biodiversity and plays a large part in determining the local weather.

== Government ==
=== Local ===
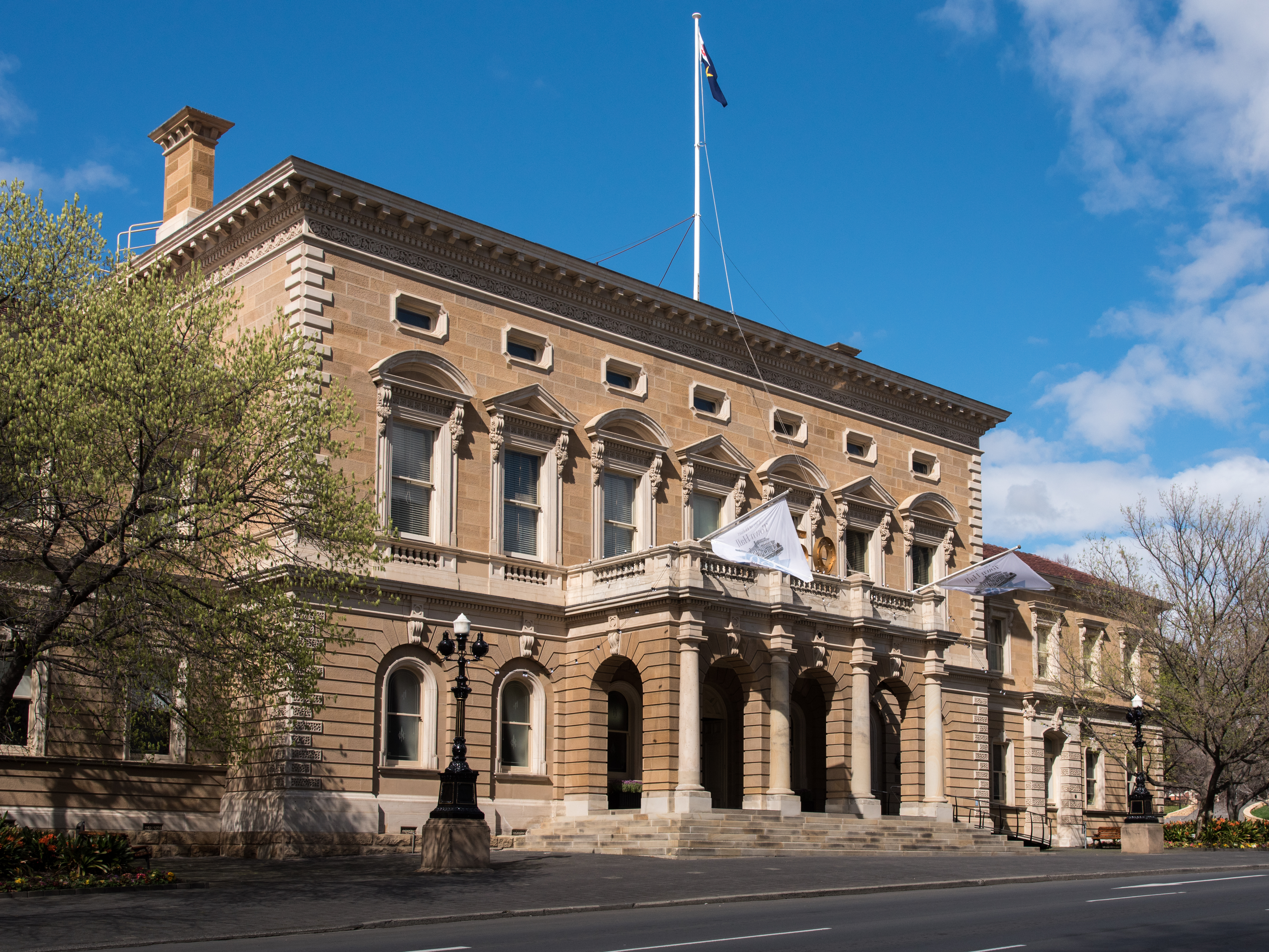
Hobart Town Hall

Greater Hobart as of the 2021 Census is divided into seven local government areas – three of which are designated as cities, City of Hobart, City of Glenorchy and City of Clarence. The remaining metropolitan area is within the Municipality of Kingborough, the Municipality of Brighton, the Municipality of Sorell and the Municipality of Derwent Valley. Each local government area has an elected council which manages functions delegated by the Tasmanian state government such as roads, planning, animal control and parks. Mains water and sewerage processing are serviced by TasWater, which is a state-wide authority part owned by the state government and local government areas.

=== State ===
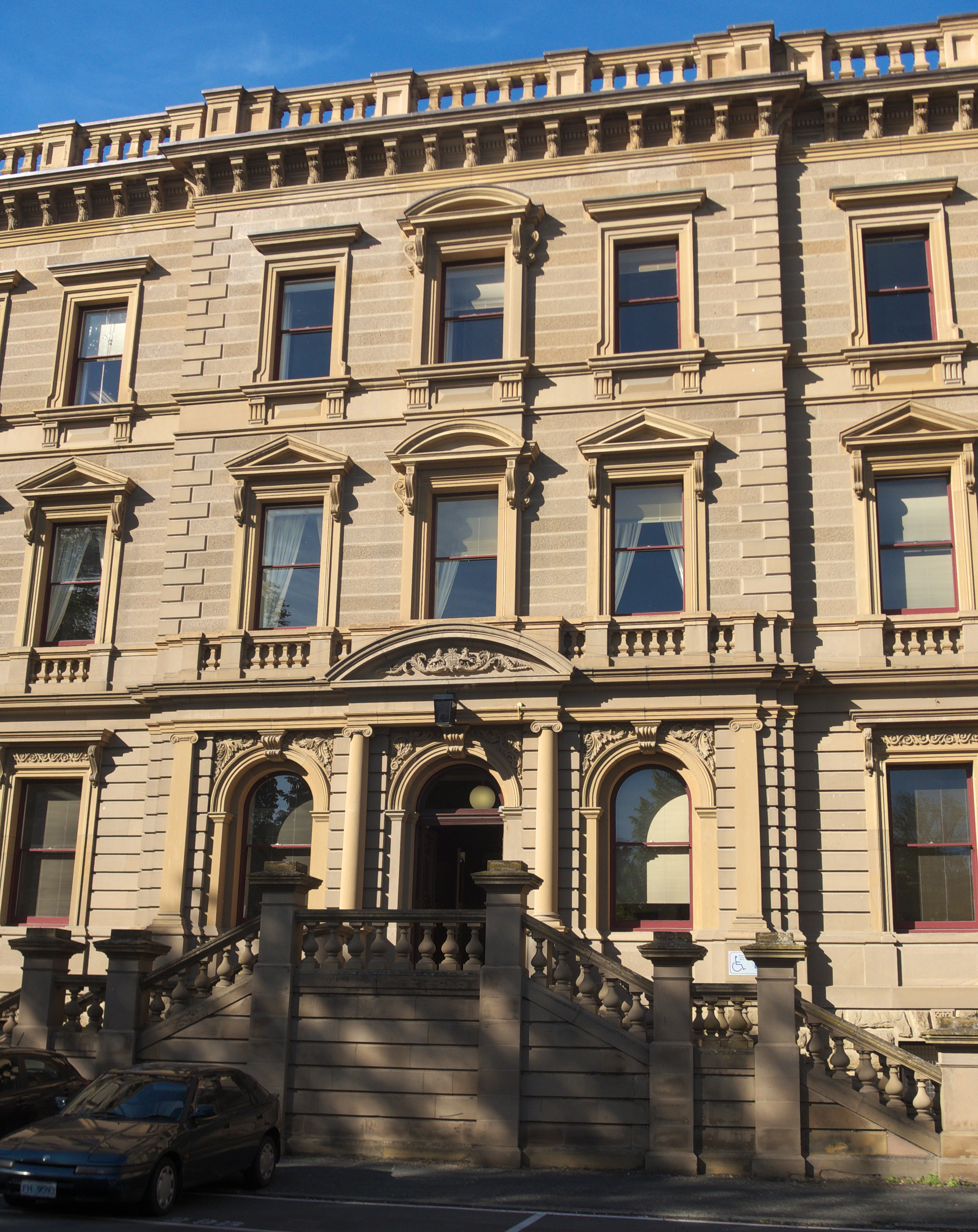
Franklin Square Offices

Hobart is the seat of the Parliament of Tasmania, located at Parliament House, Salamanca Place, and the location of the official residence of the Governor of Tasmania, Government House.

The senior sitting of the Supreme Court of Tasmania, and only sitting of the Court's appeal division, as well as the Magistrates' Court and Tasmanian Civil and Administrative Tribunal (TASCAT), sit in Hobart. The Risdon Prison Complex (which includes the Mary Hutchinson Women's Prison and Barwick Minimum Security Prison) and Hobart Reception Centre are in the region.

Hobart was made the seat of government for the southern district of Tasmania (then called Van Diemen's Land), Buckingham County in 1804, with the northern half of the state separately governed from Port Dalrymple, now George Town. At the time, Van Diemen's Land remained part of the Colony of New South Wales. In 1812, the northern lieutenant governorship ceased and Hobart become de facto seat of government for the entire island. Hobart officially became capital of an independent colony of Van Diemen's Land in 1825, and the seat of responsible self government in 1850 with the Australian Constitutions Act 1850.

== Transport ==
=== Bus ===
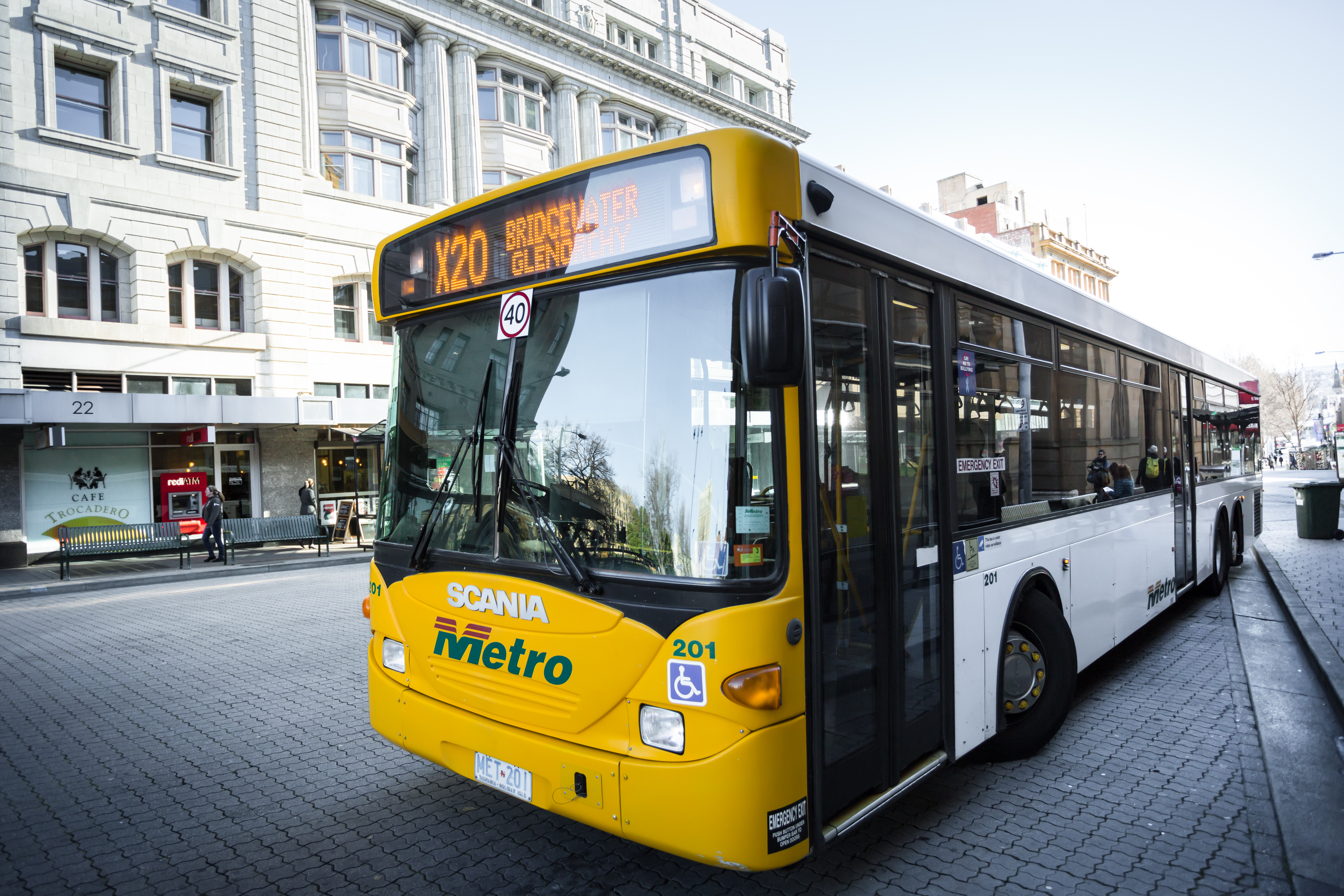
A metro bus in the Hobart Bus Mall

The main public transportation within the city of Hobart is via a network of Metro Tasmania buses operated by the Tasmanian Government. The main hub is at the centrally located Hobart Bus Mall on Elizabeth Street. The GreenCard fare ticketing system is held by about 100 thousand customers.

There are also a small number of private bus services, departing from Murray Street and the Brooke Street Pier. These include the airport SkyBus, and charters and coaches by Tassielink Transit and Kinetic Tasmania.

Tasmania spends the least per capita on public transport in Australia, which is partly responsible for a weekday usage decline of 80.8% between 1964 and 2021.

=== Road ===
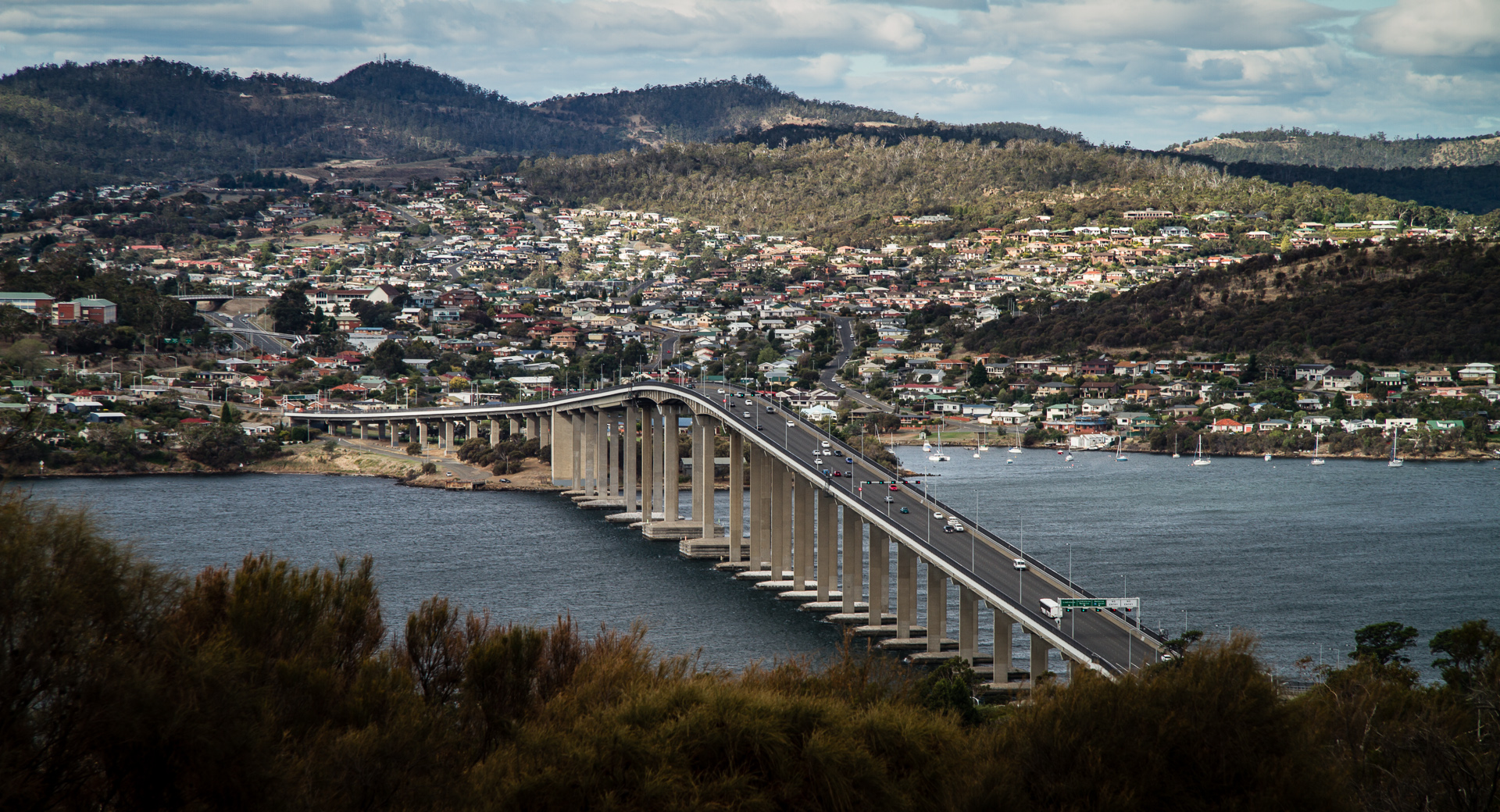
Tasman Bridge

Hobart's transport is centred around roads. The main arterial routes within the urban area are the Brooker Highway to Glenorchy and the northern suburbs, the Tasman Bridge and Bowen Bridge across the river to Rosny and the Eastern Shore. The East Derwent Highway to Lindisfarne, Geilston Bay, and northwards to Brighton, the South Arm Highway leading to Howrah, Rokeby, Lauderdale and Opossum Bay and the Southern Outlet south to Kingston and the D'Entrecasteaux Channel. Leaving the city, motorists can travel the Lyell Highway to the west coast, Midland Highway to Launceston and the north, Tasman Highway to the east coast, or the Huon Highway to the far south.

Many of these highways were built after Australia's first motor vehicle transportation study by US consultants in the 1960s, with an apparent urgency to cater to growing road traffic volumes. However, most of the targets were not achieved in the years after 1985 despite the scale of these projects, with the large amount of public funds required curbing feasibility. Another side-effect of this transition in investment away from public transport is that Hobart has limited mode redundancy compared to larger Australian capitals and a higher proportion of vehicle traffic, meaning that individual incidents can shut the entire network down.

Tasmania's largest transport project, the $786 million Bridgewater Bridge, was completed in 2025.

=== Ferry ===
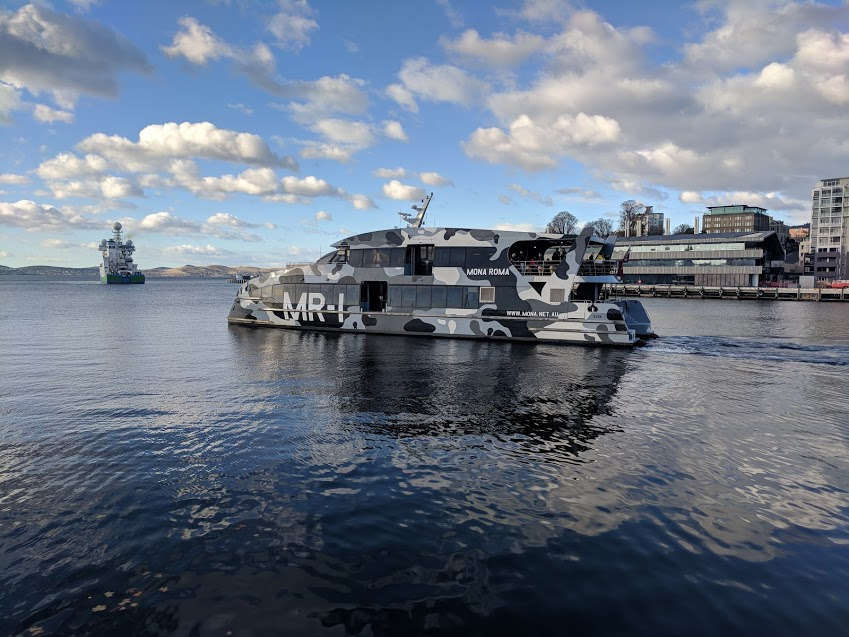
Ena departing the Port of Hobart for MONA

There is a ferry service by Derwent Ferries which operates a single line (F2) between Brooke Street Pier and Bellerive Quay that operates six days a week. It was initiated as a trial in 2021 servicing the Hobart central business district and Bellerive on the eastern shore, garnering 110 thousand passengers by the end of the year. The ferry provides a convenient alternative to crossing the Tasman Bridge choke point, with its purpose being to reduce congestion. It is seen as a first step in diversifying Hobart's transport options to reduce traffic problems by taking the number of cars off the road rather than inducing more traffic. More ferry terminal sites were revealed in 2023 to Regatta Point, Wrest Point, Wilkinsons Point, Howrah Point, Lindisfarne and Kingston Beach.

There are also private tourist ferries like the Spirit of Hobart, and two MONA Roma catamarans which take 25 minutes to the Museum of Old and New Art.

Ferry services from Hobart's Eastern Shore into the city were once a common form of public transportation, but with lack of government funding, as well as a lack of interest from the private sector, the commuter ferry service was closed for many decades – leaving Hobart's commuters relying solely on travel by automobiles and buses. There was however a water taxi service operating from the Eastern Shore into Hobart which provides an alternative to the Tasman Bridge (ferries were temporarily loaned from Sydney following the Tasman Bridge disaster). The MV Cartela was one of Australia's oldest still operating since 1912.

=== Air ===
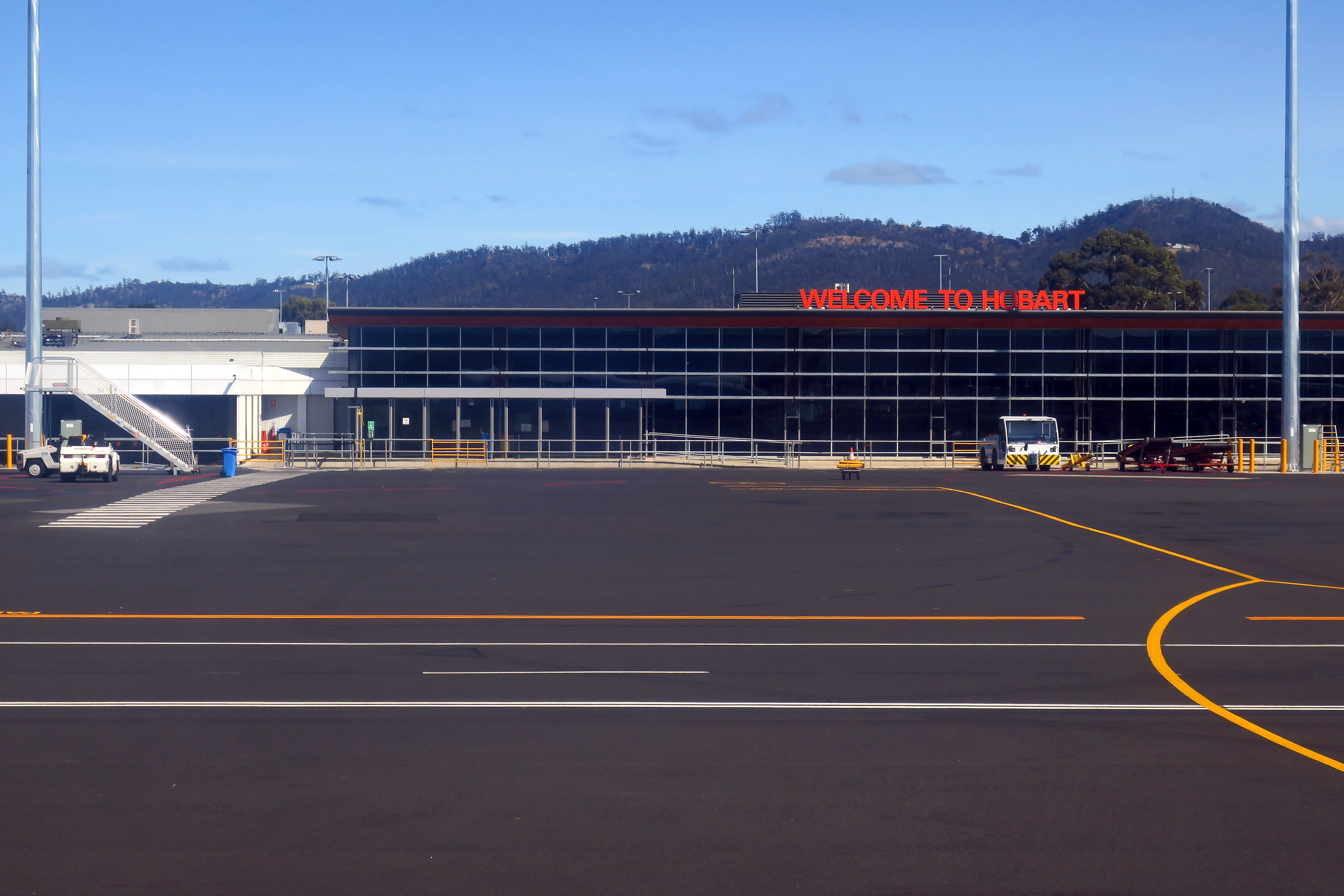
Hobart Airport terminal

Hobart is served by Hobart Airport with flights to/from Adelaide, Auckland, Brisbane, Canberra, Gold Coast, Melbourne, Perth, Sydney, and regional destinations including the Bass Strait islands. The smaller Cambridge Aerodrome mainly serves small charter airlines offering local tourist flights. In the past decade, Hobart International Airport received a huge upgrade, with the airport now being a first class airport facility.

In 2009, it was announced that Hobart Airport would receive more upgrades, including a first floor, aerobridges (currently, passengers must walk on the tarmac) and shopping facilities. Possible new international flights to Asia and New Zealand, and possible new domestic flights to Darwin and Cairns have been proposed. A second runway, possibly to be constructed in the next 15 years, would assist with growing passenger numbers to Hobart. Hobart Control Tower may be renovated and fitted with new radar equipment, and the airport's carpark may be extended further. Also, new facilities will be built just outside the airport. A new service station, hotel and day care centre have already been built and the road leading to the airport has been maintained and re-sealed. In 2016, work began on a 500-metre extension of the existing runway in addition to a $100 million upgrade of the airport. The runway extension is expected to allow international flights to land and increase air-traffic with Antarctica. This upgrade was, in part, funded under a promise made during the 2013 federal election by the Abbott government.

=== Seaport ===
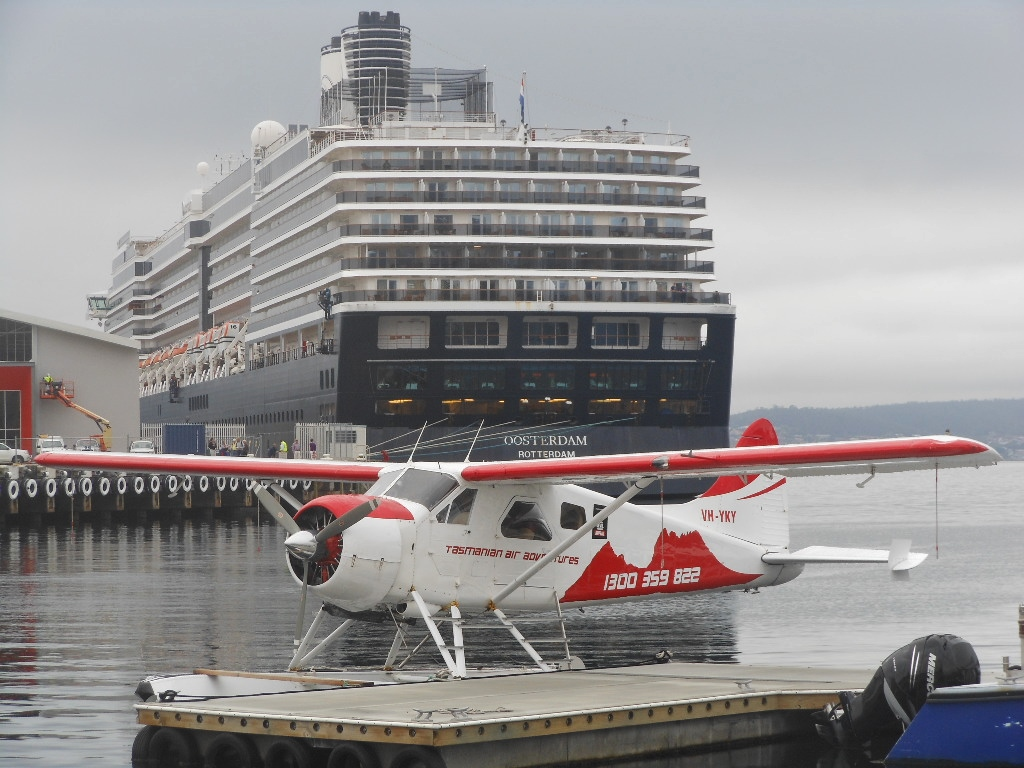
Cruise ship and seaplane at the port

Hobart's main port is managed by TasPorts and has a variety of uses. In Sullivans Cove, the two Princes Wharves are used for Antarctic restocking operations, while there are many piers and pontoons for berthing sailing boats, fishing vessels and yachts (at Victoria and Constitution Docks, especially following the Sydney to Hobart) and a seaplane. At Macquarie Point, the six Macquarie wharves are used for cruise ships (with a terminal onto Hunter Street by the port tower building) and defence vessels. Previously, shipping and services to ferry people between Sydney and Hobart such as Tasmanian Steamers and the Australian National Line, and shipbuilding occurred nearby.

=== Rail ===
While freight rail no longer operates within Hobart (since 2014), TasRail still operates the Brighton Transport Hub which connects to the main line to the north of Tasmania. Locomotives can be seen in Bridgewater as they make their way from the Boyer Mill near New Norfolk on the operational part of the Derwent Valley railway.

Like many large Australian cities, Hobart once operated high-quality passenger rail services. This included a tram network which was closed in the early 1960s. The tracks are still visible in the older streets of Hobart. It was replaced by a short-lived trolleybus network consisting of six routes which operated until 1968. Suburban passenger trains, run by the Tasmanian Government Railways, were closed in 1974 and the intrastate passenger service, the Tasman Limited, ceased running in 1978. The Tasmanian Transport Museum in Glenorchy has a restored section of track for visitors.

There has been a push from public transport advocates and the two local councils to establish a light rail network, intended to be fast, efficient, and eco-friendly, along existing tracks on the Northern Suburbs Transit Corridor to solve the frequent jamming of traffic in Hobart CBD. This has grown amidst the need for higher-capacity mass transit and an alternative State Government bus proposal. However the State Government have not ruled out Light Rail but has raised concerns regarding cost. The earlier Riverline proposal, which reached a business case (at $100 million, demonstrating benefits for socioeconomically disadvantaged areas of the city), was scrapped in the 2014 Australian federal budget.

== Infrastructure ==
=== Education ===
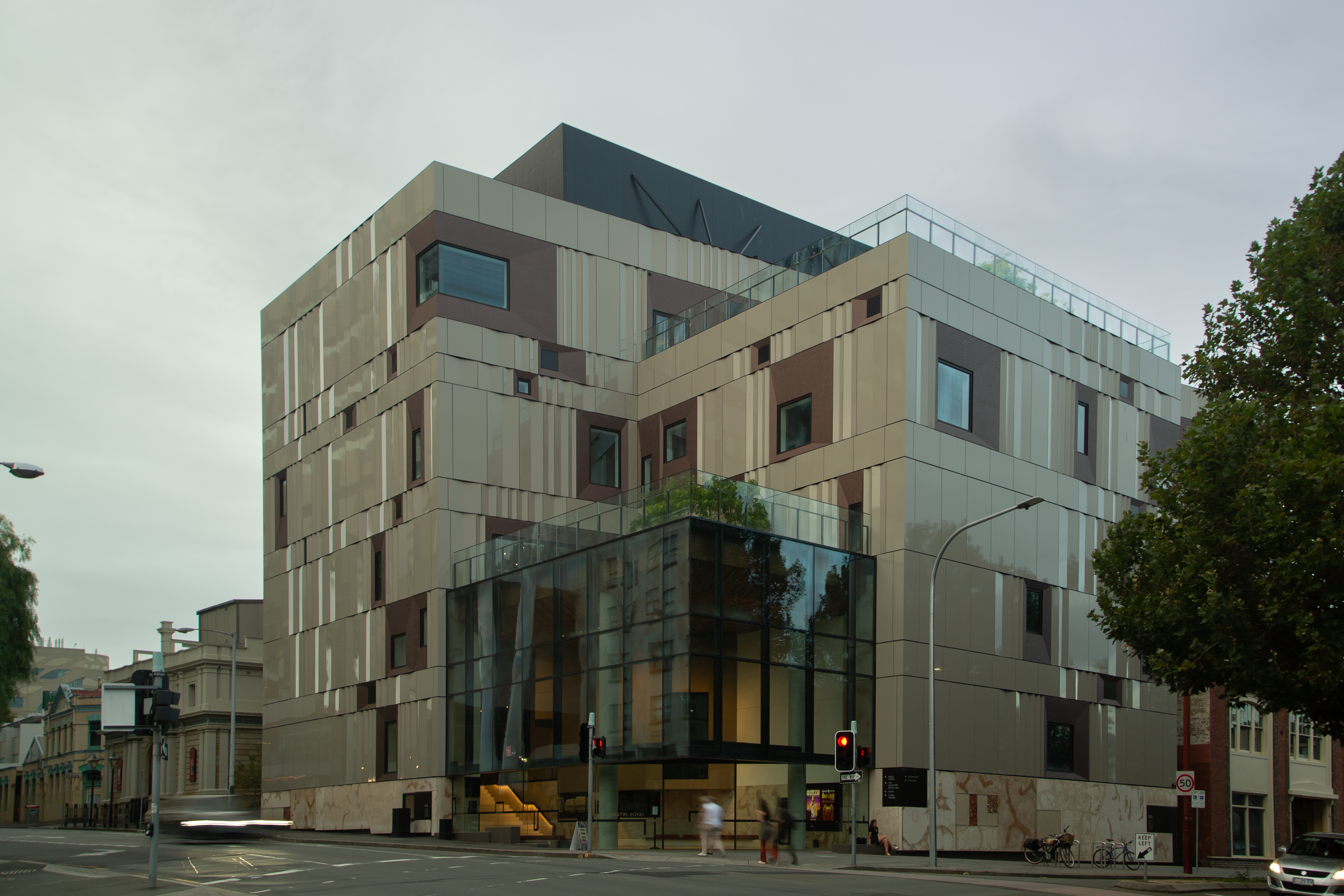
The Hedberg, part of the University of Tasmania's Hobart campus

The Greater Hobart area contains 122 primary, secondary and pretertiary (College) schools distributed throughout Clarence, Glenorchy and Hobart City Councils and Kingborough and Brighton Municipalities. These schools are made up of a mix of public, catholic, private and independent run, with the heaviest distribution lying in the more densely populated West around the Hobart city core. The Department for Education, Children and Young People is responsible for government schools and Libraries Tasmania, which operates literacy services and libraries across the region, including the State Library of Tasmania where it is headquartered.

Hobart is home to the main campus of the University of Tasmania, a sandstone university located in Sandy Bay. On-site accommodation colleges include Christ College (founded in 1846, making it Australia's oldest tertiary institution), Jane Franklin Hall and St John Fisher College. UTAS also has many sites within the Hobart City Centre, where it hosts the Medical Science Precinct, the College of Arts, Law and Education's Hunter Street campus (which also has a TasTAFE training facility), and the Institute for Marine and Antarctic Studies (IMAS) nearby the CSIRO Marine Laboratories, as well as the Hytten Hall and Hobart Apartments accommodation in Midtown. It also operates the Canopus Hill Observatory in Mount Rumney and the Mount Pleasant Radio Observatory in Cambridge.

TasTAFE operates a total of seven polytechnic campuses within the Greater Hobart area that provide vocational education and training. These include the Campbell Street campus in the city, the Clarence campus in Warrane, and Drysdale (at Claremont College and on Collins Street).

=== Health ===
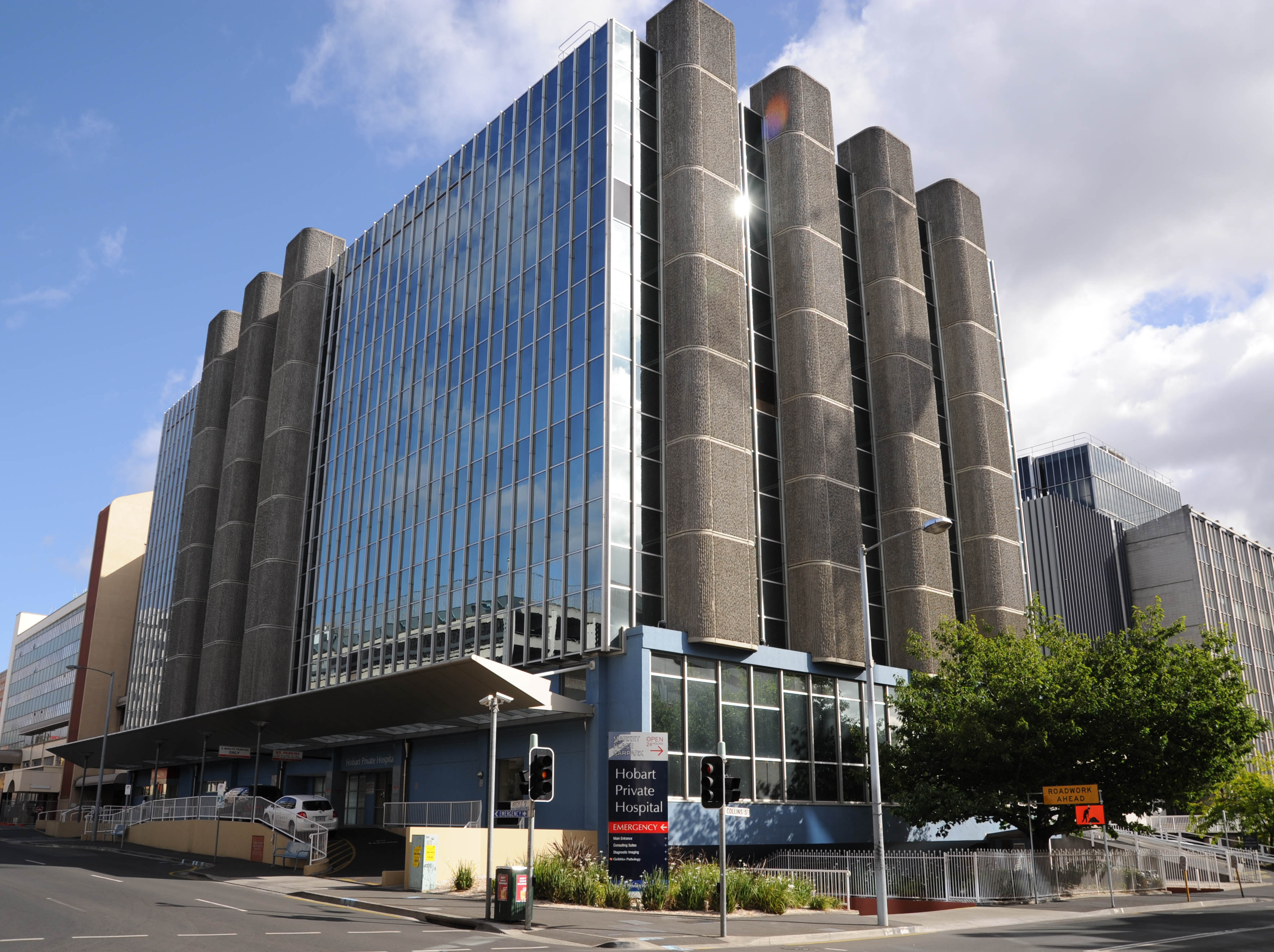
Hobart Private Hospital

The Royal Hobart Hospital (RHH) is the pre-eminent public hospital in Tasmania, located in central Hobart with 501 beds for emergency presentations and elective surgeries. It also serves as the Hobart Clinical School teaching hospital for the University of Tasmania. There are also nine ambulance stations in the Hobart region, and the SES Southern Regional Headquarters is on Bathurst Street (along with the Tasmania Fire Service Head Office on Melville/Argyle and Tasmania Police Headquarters on Liverpool).

A private hospital, Hobart Private Hospital is located adjacent to the RHH and operated by Australian healthcare provider Healthscope. The company also owned another hospital in the city, the St Helen's Private Hospital, which featured a mother-baby unit but it was closed in 2023. A new Tasman private hospital in New Town was proposed on a former WIN News site, but abandoned in 2023.

The Calvary Hospital is operated by Little Company of Mary Health Care at its main campus the Calvary-St John's Private Hospital in Lenah Valley, and has an older location in South Hobart (the former Homoeopathic Hospital). It has a Private Rehabilitation Unit.

The Hobart Clinic (formerly St Michael's Priory) is a not-for-profit operating a 27-bed psychiatric hospital in Rokeby and Mind Hub on Collins Street, with a focus on therapies.

=== Utilities ===
Drinking water and sewerage in the city is managed by TasWater, but many organisations and levels of government are involved at different stages. The first dams in Tasmania were built along the Hobart Rivulet and now there are many reservoirs in the region to safeguard the supply of water (as while Mount Wellington receives high rainfall, the city itself is dry), such as the Waterworks reservoirs via the Sandy Bay Rivulet, the Tolosa dam (disused in 2018) and Lime Kiln Gully dam in Glenorchy, and the Flagstaff Gully dam and Risdon Brook dam (which stores treated water from the New Norfolk Bryn Estyn plant) in Clarence.

TasNetworks is responsible for electricity and telecommunications provision.

== Notable people ==
- Ollie Atkins (1988–), rugby union player
- Elizabeth Blackburn (born 1948), Nobel laureate and former president of the Salk Institute for Biological Studies
- Regina Bird, reality television personality; two-time winner of Big Brother Australia (2003, 2022) and contestant on I'm A Celebrity, Get Me Out of Here
- Caroline Brothers, novelist and foreign correspondent
- Alec Campbell (1899–2002), last Australian survivor of the Gallipoli campaign
- Queen Mary of Denmark (1972–)
- Kim Dracula, Singer/Songwriter
- Thomas Dunbabin, classical archaeologist and scholar
- Errol Flynn (1909–1959), Hollywood film actor
- Jessie Isabel Henderson (1866–1951), social welfare worker
- Campbell Logan, Australian racing driver
- Dennis Miller (1937–2022), Australian stage, television and film actor
- Alex Peroni, Australian racing driver
- Nyadiew Puoch (2004–), Professional women's basketball player
- Neil the Seal, Wildlife Celebrity
- Alanna Smith (1996–), Professional women's basketball player

== Sister cities ==
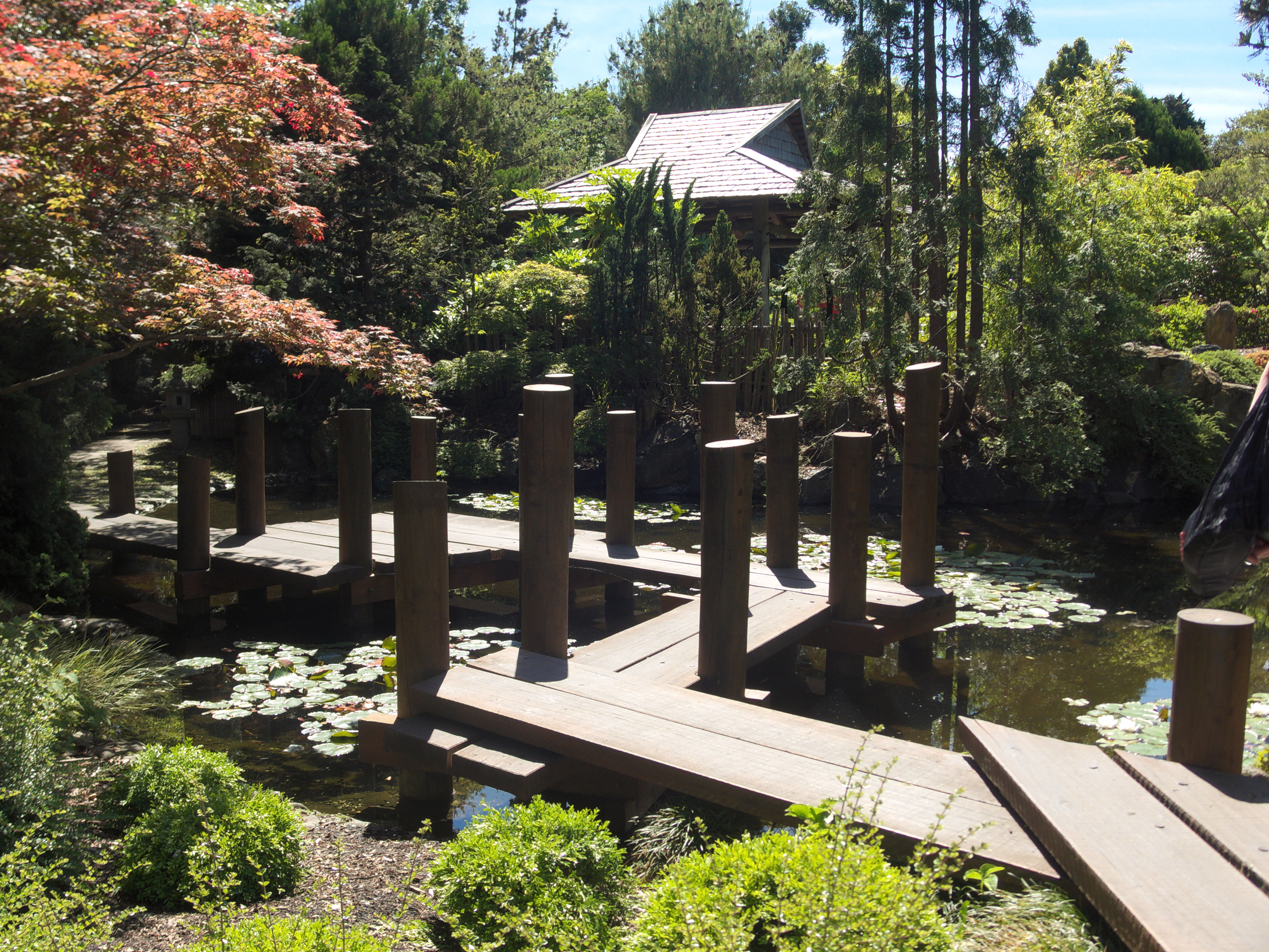
Japanese Garden at Royal Tasmanian Botanical Gardens

- Yaizu, Shizuoka Prefecture, Japan (1977)
- L'Aquila, Abruzzo, Italy (1980)
- Valdivia, Los Ríos, Chile (1998)
- Xi'an, Shaanxi, China (2015)
- Fuzhou, Fujian, China (2017)
- Huế, Vietnam (2025)
- Barile, Basilicata, Italy (2009)

== See also ==
- Hobart City Centre
- 2018 Hobart floods
