= Academic dress of the University of Tasmania =

The academic dress of the University of Tasmania describes the formal attire of robes, gowns and hoods prescribed by the ordinance of academic dress of the University of Tasmania. The ordinance prescribes the Oxford style for the gowns and hoods for both undergraduate and postgraduate academic dress.

== History ==
Dignitaries, officers, staff, graduates and students wear academic dress at public ceremonies of the University of Tasmania. These include graduation ceremonies and important public lectures. The University does not making wearing academic dress compulsory for graduation ceremonies however does prefer all participating to wear it.

Residents, staff, and visitors to Jane Franklin Hall wear academic dress to formal dinners during the academic semester. The university-owned residential colleges, Christ College and St John Fisher College, prescribed academic dress until 2009 when formal dinners were removed and their respective dining halls were replaced by cafeteria-style dining.

== University officials ==
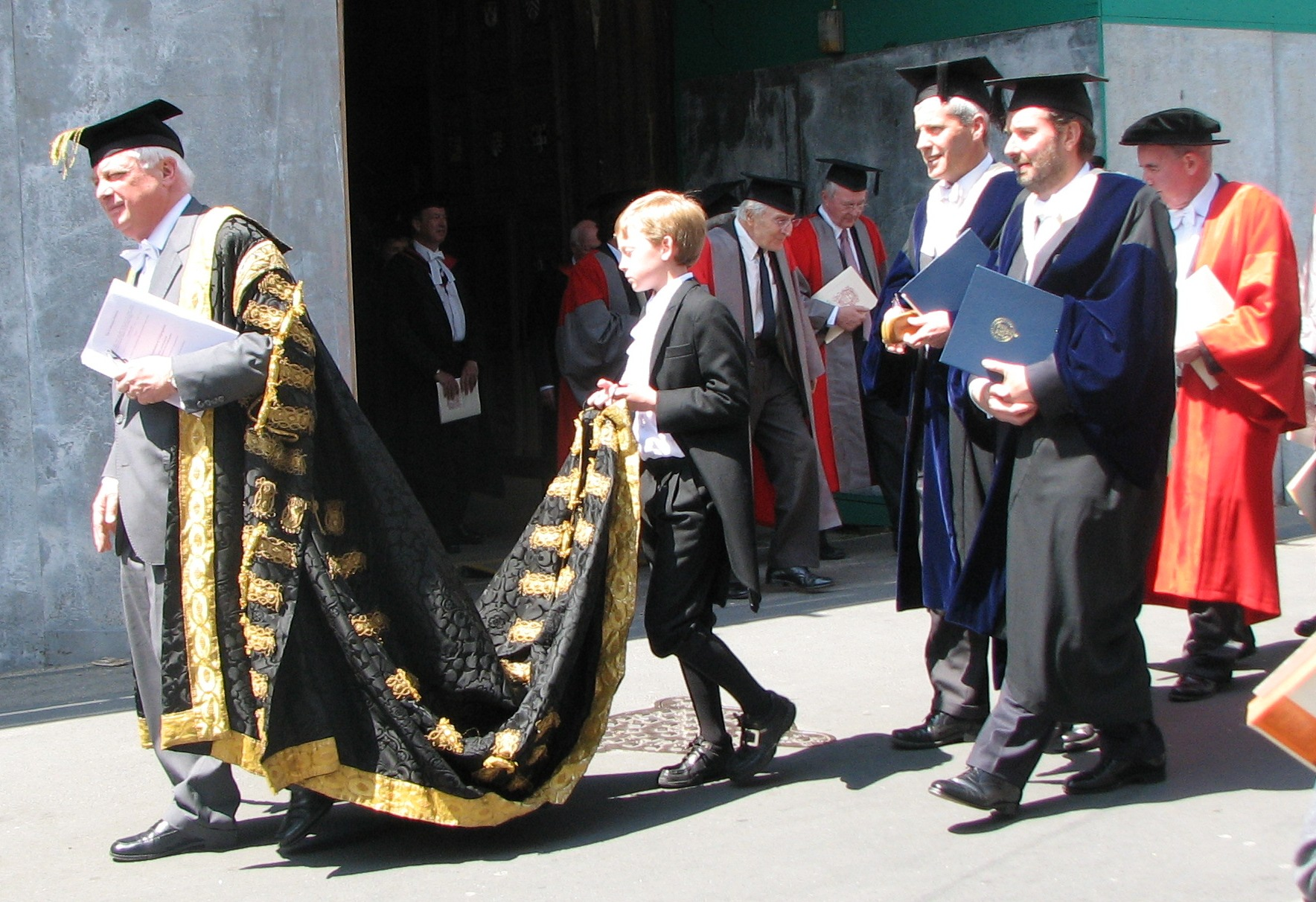
The Chancellor at the University of Oxford has a similar academic dress to that of the Chancellor of the University of Tasmania

=== Council Members ===
Members of the University Council wear a master's gown, ornamented with gold trim and embroiled gold shoulder epaulettes, with a black cloth trench cap with black tassel.

=== Chancellor, Deputy Chancellor, Vice-Chancellor, Provost and Deputy Vice-Chancellor(s) ===
Unique gowns exist for the various office holders of the University. Each office holder's academic dress includes a black gown trimmed with gold braid, either a black velvet bonnet trimmed with gold cord and tassle, or a black velvet trencher cap with gold tassel, and a number of bands of embroidery depending on the office. For the Chancellor 4 bands, Deputy Chancellor 3 bands, Vice-Chancellor 2 bands, and Provost and Deputy Vice-Chancellor(s) 1 band.

== Dress ==
=== Undergraduates ===
==== Undergraduates and associate diplomas ====
For undergraduates and holders of associate diplomas academic dress constitutes a plain black stuff gown of the same shape as that worn by scholars in the University of Oxford and a black cloth trench cap with black tassel as well as a stole of silk 10 centimetres wide, tapering to 4.5 centimetres across the shoulders, and of the length of the gown on each side.

==== Bachelors ====
For bachelor degree holders a gown of black cloth of the same shape as that worn by Bachelor of Arts in the University of Oxford, with a black cloth trencher cap with black tassel and a hood of black silk of the lined to a depth of 5 centimetres with coloured silk in the tippet and cowl. The silk is to be the relevant colour specified per each college, school or specialist institute.

==== Masters, excluding the Masters of Surgery ====
For Masters a gown of black cloth, of the same shape as that worn by Masters of Arts at the University of Oxford should be worn. A black cloth trencher cap with black tassel and a hood of black silk lined entirely with silk to the colour of the relevant college, school or specialist institute.

==== Doctors ====
Two different academic dress types exist for doctorates. The first relates to all Doctors of Philosophy which includes an academic dress of a festal gown of black cloth, fully lined in the sleeves and faced on the full length of the lapels with a width of 10 centimetres with scarlet silk, a black velvet bonnet trimmed with scarlet cord and tassel and a hood of scarlet cloth lined with scarlet silk.

For doctors, other than doctors of philosophy and professional doctorates, and for masters of surgery, a festal gown of scarlet cloth, faced on the full length of the lapels to a width of 10 centimetres with coloured silk, with open pointed sleeves fully lined with coloured silk and turned back above the elbow should be worn for academic dress. This should be accompanied with a black velvet bonnet trimmed with gold cord and tassel and a black silk hood.

=== Colours ===
College, School and Specialist Institutes	Colour	Sample
College of Arts, Law and Education:		
Music	Silver grey	
Performing Arts	Silver grey	
Fine/Visual Arts and Craft	Satinwood	
All other Arts awards	Dark blue	
Law	Crimson	
Education	Light blue	
Tasmanian School of Business and Economics:		
All Business and Economics Awards	Orange	
College of Health and Medicine:		
Medical Science	Purple	
Medicine and Surgery	Lilac	
Nursing	Blue green	
Pharmacy	Saffron	
All other Health Awards	Jacaranda	
College of Sciences and Engineering:		
Agricultural Science	Brown	
Architecture and Town Planning	Dark pink	
Environmental Design	Dark pink	
Environmental Studies	Light pink	
Geomatics and Surveying	Green muscat	
Engineering and Technology	Green	
All other Science and Engineering awards	White	

=== Aboriginal or Torres Strait Islanders ===
Aboriginal or Torres Strait Islanders are entitled to wear an additional scarf as part of their academic dress, styled after the Australian Aboriginal flag and the Torres Strait Islander flag. The introduction of the scarves into the academic dress was intended by the University to "recognise the traditional owners of the land".

== See also ==
- Academic dress
- Groves classification system
