= College of Sciences and Engineering (University of Tasmania) =

College of the University of Tasmania

Coordinates: 42°54′17″S 147°19′22″E

- Established: 2018 as the College of Sciences and Engineering
- Parent institution: University of Tasmania
- Vice-Chancellor: Rufus Black
- Executive Dean: Brian Yates
- Location: Hobart, Launceston and Burnie, Tasmania; Sydney, New South Wales, Australia
- Website: www.utas.edu.au/sciences-engineering

The College of Sciences and Engineering is a college of the University of Tasmania that incorporates the School of Natural Sciences, School of Technology, Environments and Design, the Australian Maritime College, the Institute for Marine and Antarctic Studies, and the Tasmanian Institute of Agriculture. The college incorporates science, technology, engineering, and mathematics (STEM) education and research at the University.

== Schools and Institutes ==
=== Australian Maritime College ===
The Australian Maritime College (AMC) was founded in 1978 and is Australia's national centre for maritime education, training and research. The College incorporates maritime engineering and hydrodynamics, maritime business and international logistics, ocean seafaring, and coastal seafaring vocational education and other short course into its curricula and research focus. The AMC hosts two national centres as part of its organisation, the National Centre for Maritime Engineering and Hydrodynamics, and the National Centre for Ports and Shipping. The AMC has a commercial arm, AMC Search, that provides maritime related training and consultancy for international and Australian organisations for both commercial, research and military application.

=== Institute for Marine and Antarctic Studies ===
The Institute for Marine and Antarctic Studies was established in 2010 following a partnership between the CSIRO, Australian Antarctic Division and the University of Tasmania. The partnership was as a core research and education institute which focused on the themes of oceans and cryosphere, fisheries and aquaculture, and ecology and biodiversity. These themes linked with cross-disciplinary search goals focusing on climate change, ocean-earth system, and ocean and Antarctic governance.

=== School of Natural Sciences ===
The School of Natural Sciences focuses on biological sciences, chemistry, earth sciences, mathematics, and physics education and research.

Research centres and Institutes

- ARC Centre for Forest Value
- ARC Training Centre for Portable Analytical Separation Technologies (ASTech)
- Australian Centre for Research on Separation Science (ACROSS)
- Centre for Ore Deposit and Earth Science (CODES)
- The Cooperative Research Centre for Optimsing Resource Extraction (CRC ORE)
- ARC Industrial Transformation Research Hub for Transforming the Mining Value Chain (TMVC)

=== School of Technology, Environments and Design ===
The School of Technology, Environments and Design (TED) focuses on information and communication technology, geography and spatial sciences, and architecture and design. The School is home to the Human Interface Technology Laboratory Australia (HITLab Australia) and the Centre for Sustainable Architecture with Wood (CSAW).

=== Tasmanian Institute of Agriculture ===
The Tasmanian Institute of Agriculture (TIA) was founded in 1996 and devoted to the research and development of sustainable agricultural industries. The institute works as a collaboration between the Tasmanian Government and the University of Tasmania.
