= Mount Pleasant Radio Observatory =

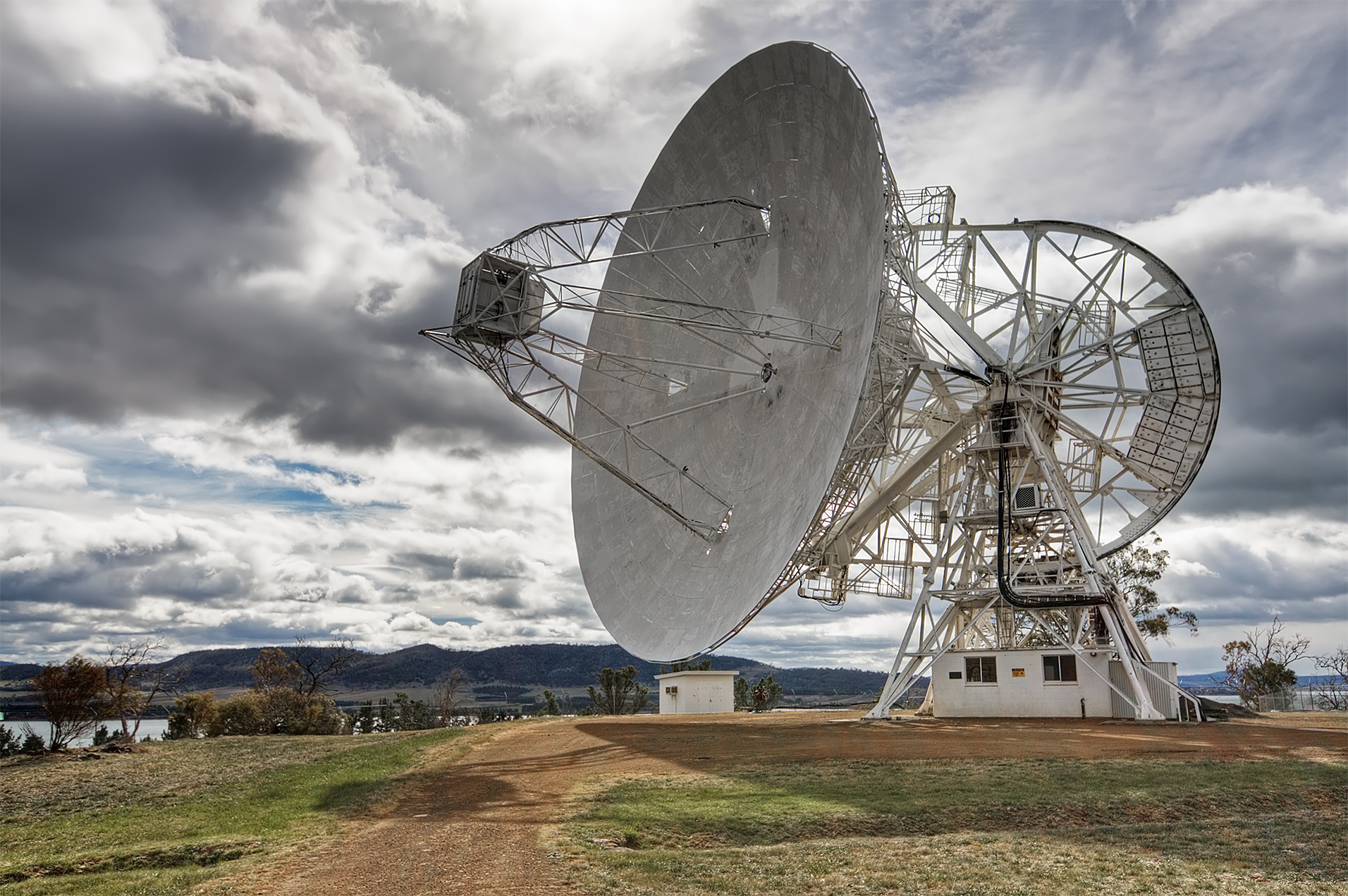
- The large number of available receivers makes the telescope suitable for a variety of research projects within the University of Tasmania and its location makes it a vital element in the Australian Long Baseline Array network.
- Organization: University of Tasmania
- Location: Cambridge, Tasmania, Australia
- Coordinates: 42°48′13″S 147°26′26″E
- Altitude: 43 m (141 ft)
- Established: 13 May 1986
- Website: ra-wiki.phys.utas.edu.au
- Telescopes: AuScope Hobart Antenna; Mount Pleasant Antenna; Vela Antenna
- Related media on Commons

The Mount Pleasant Radio Observatory is a radio-astronomy-based observatory owned and operated by the University of Tasmania, located 20 km east of Hobart in Cambridge, Tasmania. It is home to three radio astronomy antennas and the Grote Reber Museum.

== Equipment ==
The observatory has two active radio telescopes: the Mount Pleasant 26 m antenna and a 12 m AuScope VLBI Antenna. The Observatory is linked to the University of Tasmania's Hobart campus with a 25 km fibre optic cable, installed in 2007.

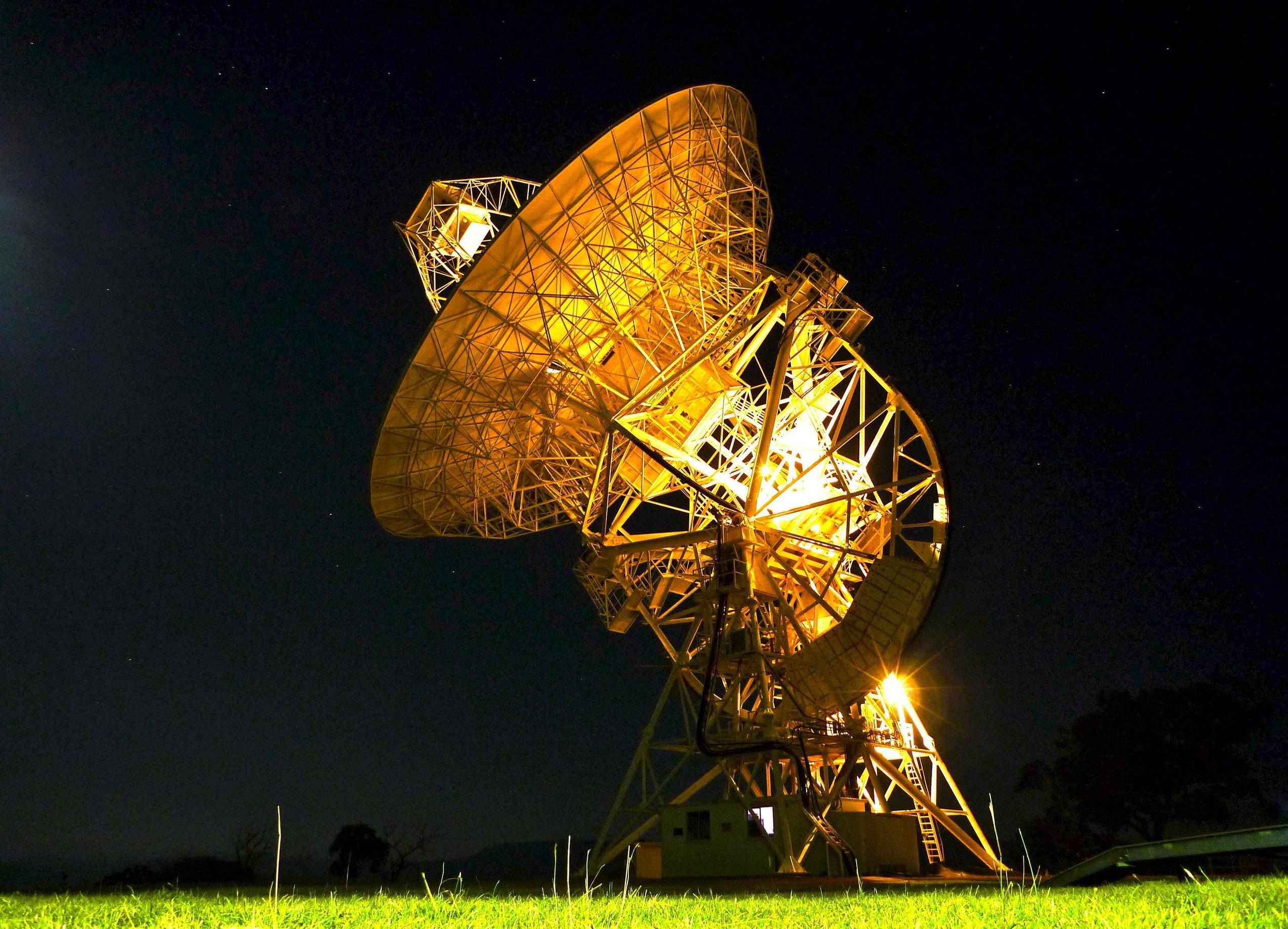
The 26-metre dish at Mount Pleasant as seen at night

The 14 m Vela telescope that was constructed in 1981 as a dedicated instrument for observation of the Vela Pulsar was decommissioned in 2006, after which a refurbishing process began. The telescope tracked the pulsar 18 hours per day, nearly continuously for over 20 years.

The 26 m Radio dish came from the Orroral Valley Tracking Station in the Australian Capital Territory, where it was used as a satellite tracker within the Spacecraft Tracking and Data Acquisition Network and then for support to NASA crewed missions. The 26 m telescope is used in Australia's very long baseline interferometry (VLBI) network.

== Other telescopes ==
The University of Tasmania also operates three other radio astronomy antennas: the 30 m Ceduna Radio Observatory (South Australia) and two additional AuScope 12 m antennas at Katherine (Northern Territory) and Yaragadee (Western Australia).

The University also owns and operates the Bisdee Tier Optical Astronomy Observatory. The Canopus Hill Observatory is closed.

== Museum ==
An on-site museum is dedicated to the life and works of Grote Reber; it contains some of his ashes and a 3D theatre. It also discusses Tasmania's major role in radiophysics. The museum hosts about 5000 visitors annually and runs several Open Days each year. Some University of Tasmania students act as tour guides as part of their studies.

== See also ==
- List of radio telescopes
