= IMAS =

IMAS may refer to:

- The International Mine Action Standards issued by the United Nations
- The Institute for Marine and Antarctic Studies at the University of Tasmania
