= Greenhill Observatory =

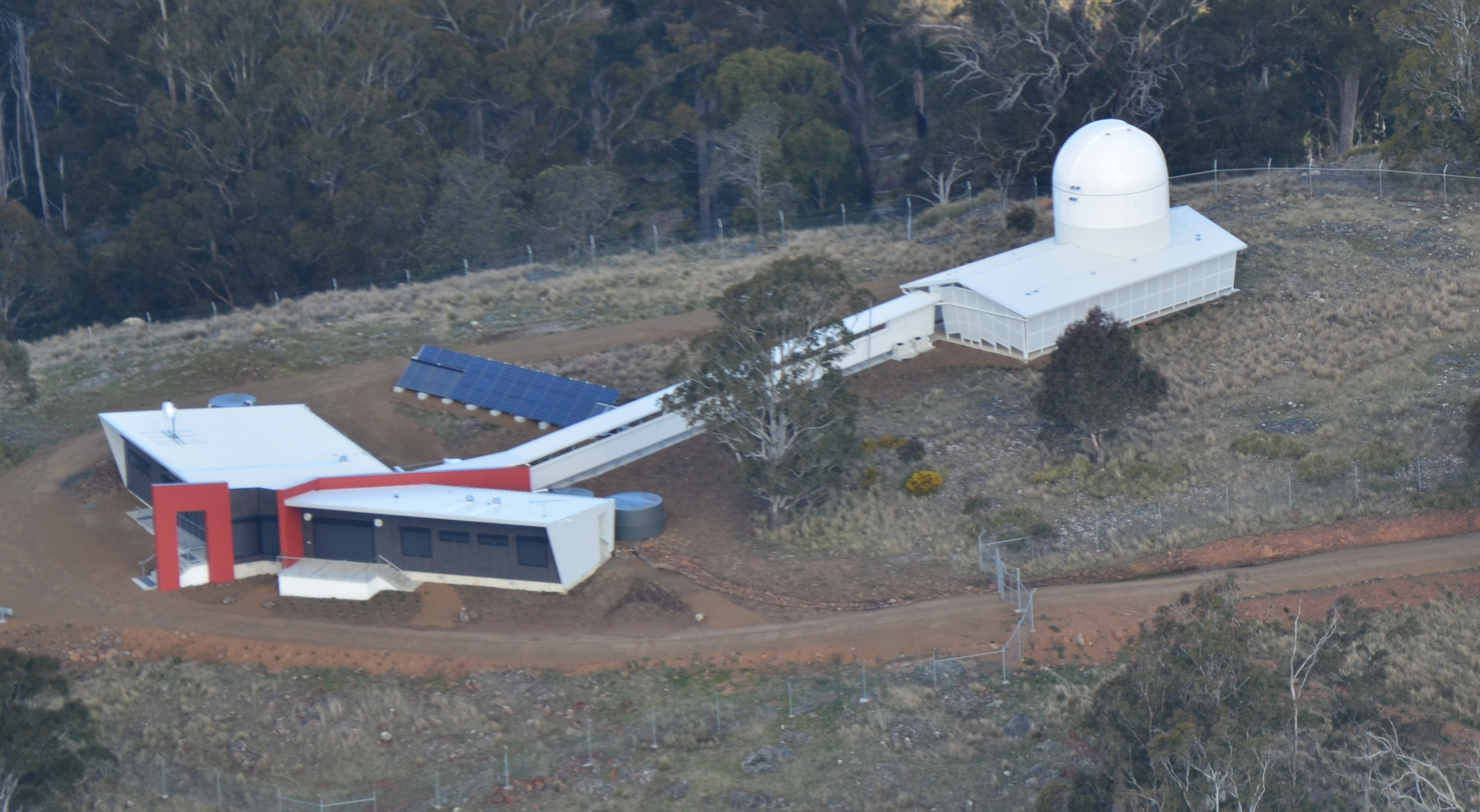
- Aerial view of the Greenhill Observatory showing the H127 dome
- Alternative names: Bisdee Tier Optical Astronomy Observatory
- Organization: University of Tasmania
- Location: Tasmania, AUS
- Coordinates: 42°25′52″S 147°17′16″E
- Altitude: 646 m (2,119 ft)
- Established: 2013
- Website: www.utas.edu.au/natural-sciences/physics/greenhill-observatory
- Telescopes: H127 telescope
- Location of Greenhill Observatory
- Related media on Commons

The Greenhill Observatory is an astronomical observatory operated by the University of Tasmania (UTAS) on Bisdee Tier, near Spring Hill, Tasmania. The observatory is located roughly 50 km (30 miles) north of Hobart, (Australia). The nearest municipality is the village of Jericho. The observatory was officially opened by the Governor of Tasmania in February, 2013. The facility is named in honour of longtime University of Tasmania astrophysicist Dr John G. Greenhill (1933-2014).

== Telescopes ==
The site replaces the University of Tasmania's previous observatory at Canopus Hill, near Hobart. The site was developed with the installation of a 1.3 m telescope in mind, and consideration given for possible future expansion. One telescope is currently hosted, the Harlingten Telescope (H127).

- The H127 is a 1.27 m (50 in) diameter reflector of modified Ritchey-Chrétien design, on an equatorial fork mount. The H127 has a rotating tertiary mirror and wide-field corrector lenses installed at two folded Cassegrain (Nasmyth) focal stations, allowing rapid switching between instruments. The H127 was donated to the University of Tasmania by Mr Caisey Harlingten.
- In January 2023, a A$2 million antenna with bi-static radar capability was unveiled. It will be used to locate satellites and space debris.

== See also ==
- Mount Pleasant Radio Observatory
- List of astronomical observatories
