= College of Health and Medicine (University of Tasmania) =

College of the University of Tasmania

Coordinates: 42°54′17″S 147°19′22″E

- Type: Medical School
- Established: 1965 as the School of Medicine
- Parent institution: University of Tasmania
- Vice-Chancellor: Rufus Black
- Executive Dean: Denise Fassett
- Location: Hobart, Launceston and Burnie, Tasmania; Sydney, New South Wales, Australia
- Website: www.utas.edu.au/health

The College of Health and Medicine is a college of the University of Tasmania that incorporates the School of Medicine, School of Health Sciences, Wicking Centre and Menzies Institute for Medical Research. The college incorporates medicine, pharmacy, psychology, paramedicine, nursing, laboratory medicine, allied health sciences and rural health into its curricula and research.

== History ==
The first medical education offered at the University of Tasmania was the School of Medicine. The School was founded in 1965 to response to a workforce shortage of doctors in Tasmania.

== Schools and Institutes ==
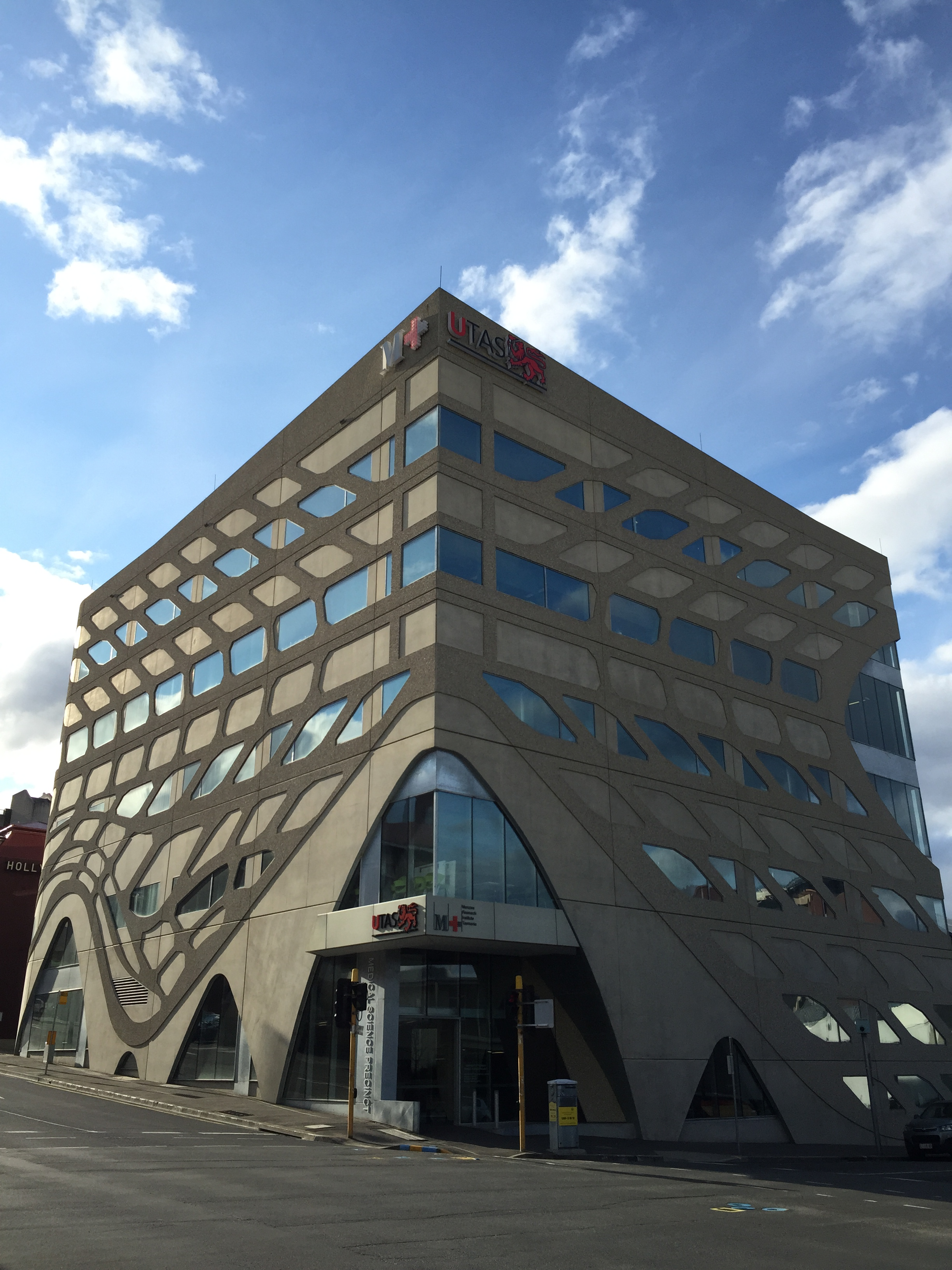
The MS1 Building of the Medical Science Precinct and home to the College of Health and Medicine

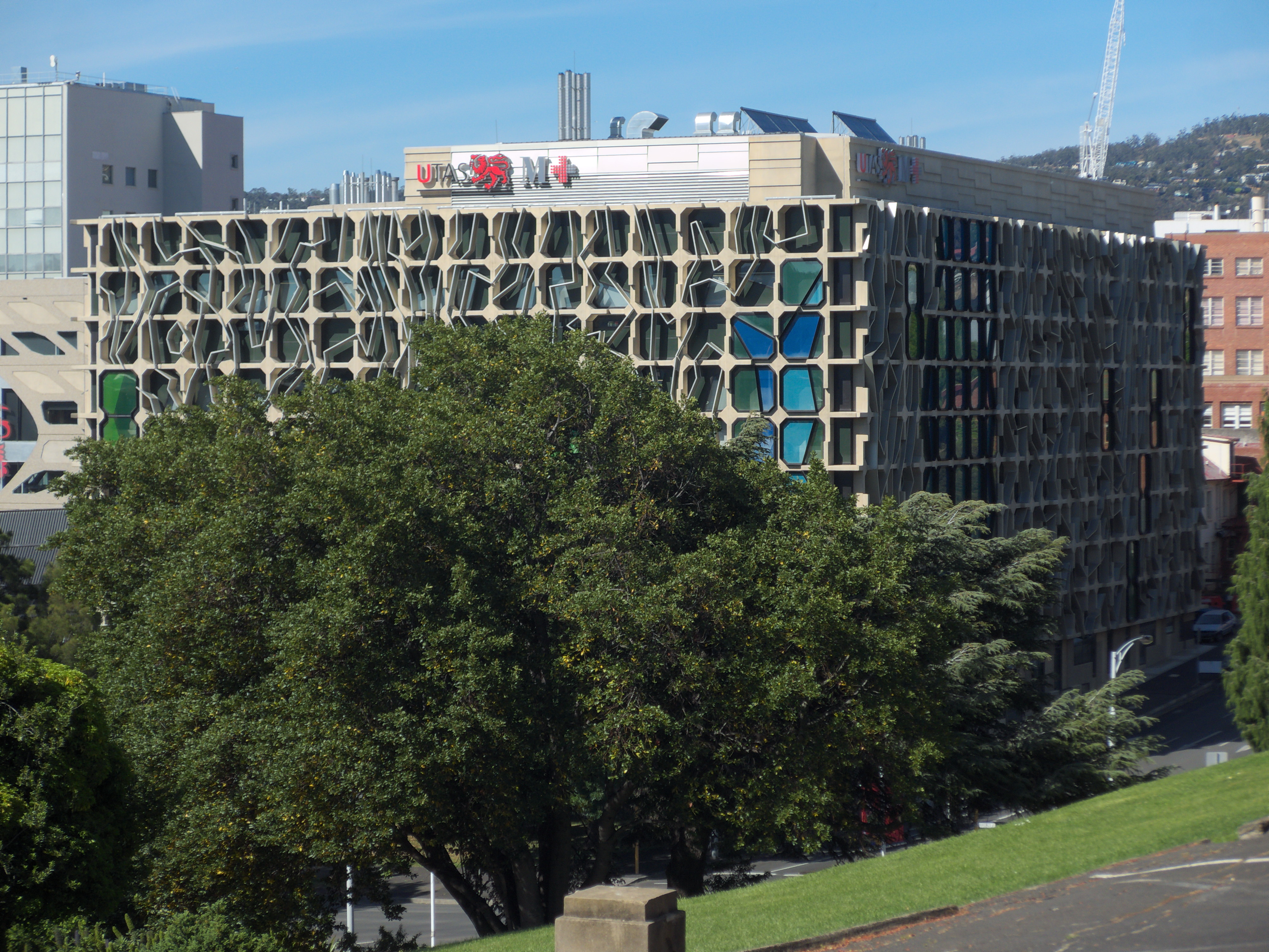
The MS2 Building of the Medical Science Precinct in Hobart

=== School of Medicine ===
The School of Medicine is predominately based at the Medical Science Precinct in Hobart which offers studies in medicine, Pharmacy, Psychology and Paramedicine.

=== School of Health Sciences ===
The School of Health Sciences specialises in nursing, laboratory medicine, allied health sciences and rural health.

=== Wicking Centre ===
The Wicking Dementia Research and Education centre was founded in 2008 and focuses on the research, education and public understanding of dementia diseases. The Centre undertakes this mission through free MOOC's and traditional territory education in a Diploma of Dementia Care, Bachelor of Dementia Care, Bachelor of Ageing and Dementia Studies and a Master of Dementia Program.

=== Menzies Institute ===
The Menzies Institute for Medical Research (formerly the Menzies Centre for Health Research) was founded in 1988. The Institute focuses on five major research themes: public health and primary care, brain diseases and injury, heart and blood vessels, bone and muscle health, and cancer, genetics and immunology.

== Clinical schools and teaching hospitals ==
- Hobart Clinical School: Royal Hobart Hospital
- Launceston Clinical School: Launceston General Hospital
- Rural Clinical School: Mersey Community Hospital and the North West Regional Hospital
- St. Vincent's Hospital, Darlinghurst Campus
