= University of Tasmania =

Public university in Tasmania, Australia

Coordinates: 42°54′17″S 147°19′22″E

- Coat of arms
- Motto: Latin: Ingeniis Patuit Campus
- Motto in English: "The field lies open to talent"
- Type: Public research university
- Established: 1846 (as Christ College); 1890 (university status)
- Accreditation: TEQSA
- Academic affiliations: Utrecht Network (AEN); AMC; ASAIHL; OUA
- Endowment: A$120 million (2023)
- Budget: A$770.2 million (2023)
- Visitor: Governor of Tasmania (ex officio)
- Chancellor: Alison Watkins
- Vice-Chancellor: Rufus Black
- Total staff: 2,957 (FTE, 2023)
- Students: 29,259 (2023)
- Location: Hobart; Launceston; Burnie; Sydney, Australia
- Campus: Urban and regional with multiple sites
- Colours: Red Black
- Sporting affiliations: UniSport; EAEN; UBL
- Mascot: Mumford the Lion
- Website: utas.edu.au

The University of Tasmania (UTAS) is a public research university, primarily located in Tasmania, Australia. Founded in 1890, it is Australia's fourth oldest university. Christ College, one of the university's residential colleges, first proposed in 1840 in Lieutenant-Governor Sir John Franklin's Legislative Council, was modelled on the Oxford and Cambridge colleges, and was founded in 1846, making it the oldest tertiary institution in the country. The university is a sandstone university, a member of the international Association of Commonwealth Universities, and the Association of Southeast Asian Institutions of Higher Learning.

The university offers various undergraduate and graduate programs in a range of disciplines, and has links with 20 specialist research institutes and co-operative research centres. Its Institute for Marine and Antarctic Studies has strongly contributed to the university's multiple 5 rating scores (well above world standard) for excellence in research awarded by the Australian Research Council. The university also delivers tertiary education at the Australian Maritime College, the national centre for maritime education, training and research.

The University is recognised for its work on climate change, sustainability, and resource management, earning it a high global ranking in the Times Higher Education Impact Ratings in 2022, 2023, 2024, 2025, and 2026. UTAS's initiatives include climate-focused research, offering over 100 courses with climate-focused units, low-carbon energy use in new campus developments, divesting from fossil fuels, and a commitment to carbon neutrality, which has been certified by Climate Active since 2016.

== History ==
=== Founding and early years (1890–1938) ===
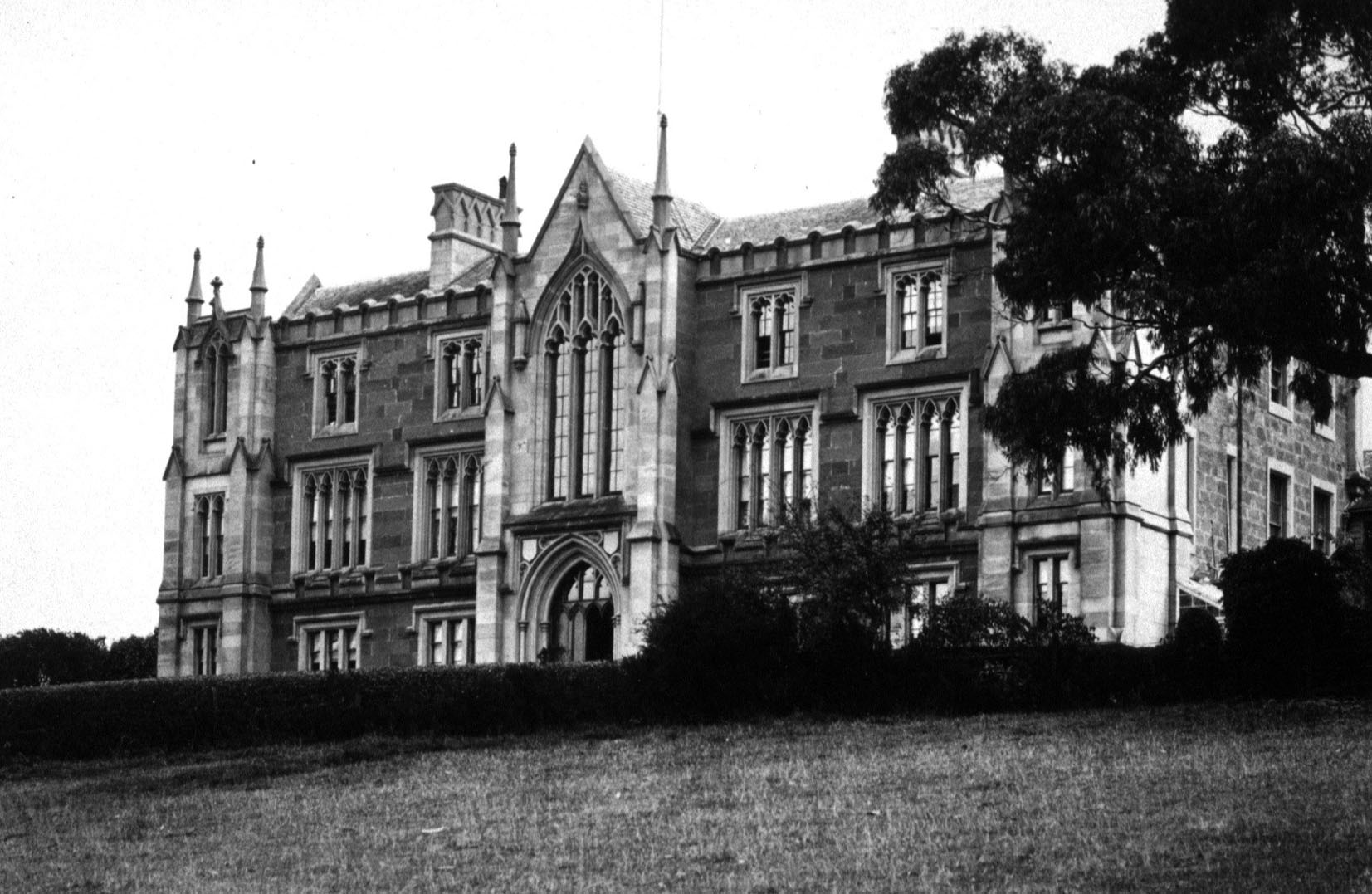
The university's first site at Queens Domain which today houses its School of Nursing

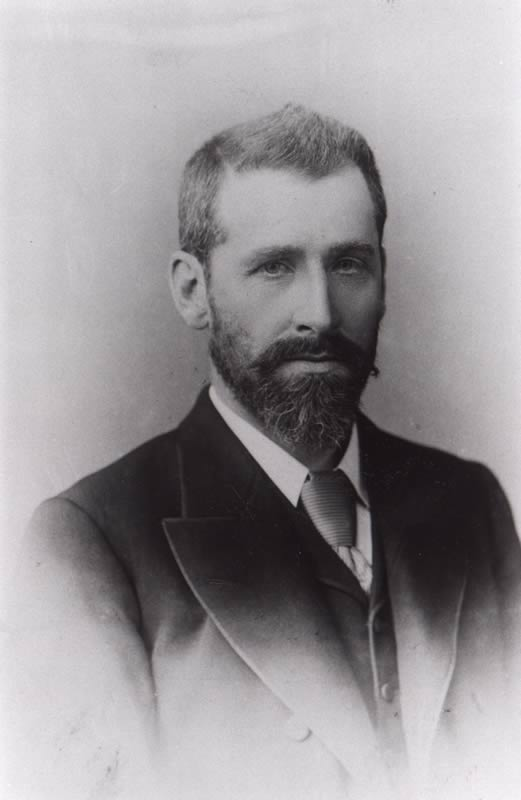
Andrew Inglis Clark a major contributor to the Constitution of Australia, served as Vice-Chancellor of the university from 1901 to 1903

The University of Tasmania was established on 1 January 1890, after the abolition of overseas scholarships freed up funds. It immediately took over the role of the Tasmanian Council for Education. Richard Deodatus Poulett Harris, who had long advocated for the establishment of the university, became its first warden of the senate. The first degrees to graduates admitted ad eundem gradum and diplomas were awarded in June 1890. The university was offered an ornate sandstone building on the Queens Domain in Hobart, previously the High School of Hobart, though it was leased by others until mid-1892. This eventually became known as University House. Three lecturers began teaching 11 students from 22 March 1893, once University House had been renovated. Parliamentarians branding it an unnecessary luxury made the university's early existence precarious. The institution's encouragement of female students fuelled criticism. James Backhouse Walker, a local lawyer and briefly vice-chancellor, mounted a courageous defence.

According to Chancellor Sir John Morris, from 1918 until 1939 the institution still 'limped along'. Distinguished staff had already been appointed, such as historian William Jethro Brown, physicists and mathematicians Alexander McAulay and his son Alexander Leicester McAulay, classicist RL Dunbabin, and philosopher and polymath Edmund Morris Miller. Housed in the former Hobart High School, facilities were totally outgrown, but the state government was slow to fund a new campus.

In 1914 the university petitioned King George V for Letters Patent, which request he granted. The Letters Patent, sometimes called the Royal Charter, granted the university's degrees status as equivalent to the established universities of the United Kingdom, where such equivalents existed.

=== World War II (1939–45) ===
During World War II, while the Optical Munitions Annexe assisted the war effort, local graduates, replacing soldier academics, taught a handful of students. New post-war staff, many with overseas experience, pressed for removal to adequate facilities at Sandy Bay on an old rifle range. Chancellor Sir John Morris, also Chief Justice, though a dynamic reformer, antagonised academics by his authoritarianism. Vice-chancellor Torleiv Hytten, a Norwegian-born economist, saw contention peak while the move to Sandy Bay was delayed. In a passionate open letter to the premier, Philosophy Professor Sydney Orr goaded the government into establishing the 1955 Royal Commission into the university. The commission's report demanded extensive reform of both university and governing council. Staff were delighted, while lay administrators fumed.

=== Post-war years (1946–1964) ===
On 10 May 1949, the university awarded its first Doctor of Philosophy to Joan Munro Ford. Ford worked as a research biologist in the University of Tasmania's Department of Physics between 1940 and 1950.

In early 1956 Orr was summarily dismissed, mainly for his alleged though denied seduction of a student. A ten-year battle involved academics in Australia and overseas. Orr lost an unfair dismissal action in the Supreme Court of Tasmania and the High Court of Australia. The Tasmanian Chair of Philosophy was boycotted. In 1966 Orr received some financial compensation from the university, which also established a cast-iron tenure system. The latter disappeared with the federal reorganisation of higher education in the late 1980s.

In the early 1960s The University of Tasmania at last transferred to a purpose-built new campus at Sandy Bay, though many departments were initially housed in ex-World War II wooden huts. It profited from increasing federal finance following the 1957 Murray Report. Medical and Agricultural Schools were established and the sciences obtained adequate laboratories. Physics achieved world recognition in astronomy (optical, radio and cosmic rays), while other departments attracted good scholars and graduates were celebrated in many fields. Student facilities improved remarkably.

=== Mergers and the "new" university (1965–99) ===
The 1965 Martin Report established a traditional role for universities, and a more practical role for colleges of advanced education. The Tasmanian Government duly created the Tasmanian College of Advanced Education (TCAE) in 1966 sited on Mount Nelson above the university. It initially incorporated The School of Art, the Conservatorium of Music and the Hobart Teachers College. In 1971, a Launceston campus of the TCAE was announced. These were fateful decisions, as events over the next years showed. It was argued that the TCAE attempted to compete with the university, not complement it.

In 1978 the University of Tasmania took over two of the courses offered by the TCAE in Hobart, Pharmacy and Surveying, following a report by Professor Karmel, and another by H.E. Cosgrove. Some other TCAE courses in Hobart moved to Launceston. The curious situation of three separate courses in teacher education in the State could not last, however, and following two more reports, the university incorporated the remaining courses of the Hobart campus of the College of Advanced Education in 1981, which raised its numbers to 5000. The Launceston campus of the TCAE renamed itself the Tasmanian State Institute of Technology (TSIT).

In 1987, the University Council resolved to approach the TSIT to negotiate a merger to minimise ongoing conflict. The 'Dawkins Revolution' and the 'unified national system' provided later support for this initiative. The Tasmanian State Institute of Technology became the Newnham Campus of the university on 1 January 1991, exactly 101 years after the university's founding. A new campus at Burnie on the North-West Coast of Tasmania was opened in 1995, and later became known as the Cradle Coast Campus.

=== 21st century ===
In 2001, the Tasmania Law Reform Institute (TLRI) was established to create a link between institutional law reform in the State created by the demise of first the Tasmanian Law Reform Commission in 1989, and then its replacement, the Tasmanian Law Reform Commissioner in 1997. The new institutes model was based on the Alberta Law Reform Institute, an agency based on an agreement between the Canadian province of Alberta, the Law Society, and the University of Alberta and funded primarily by the Government and the Law Society of Alberta. The TLRI has been used as a template for the establishment of similar institutes at the University of Adelaide with the South Australian Law Reform Institute and in the Australian Capital Territory.

Damian Bugg became the university's chancellor in 2006, having previously served as a member of the University Council since 2001. Bugg was an alumnus of the university who studied law and resided at John Fisher College where he was president. While chancellor, he also served as Commonwealth Director of Public Prosecutions. That year the university opened two satellite campuses in Sydney, offering nursing and paramedic education in partnership with local hospitals and health services such as St Vincent's Hospital.

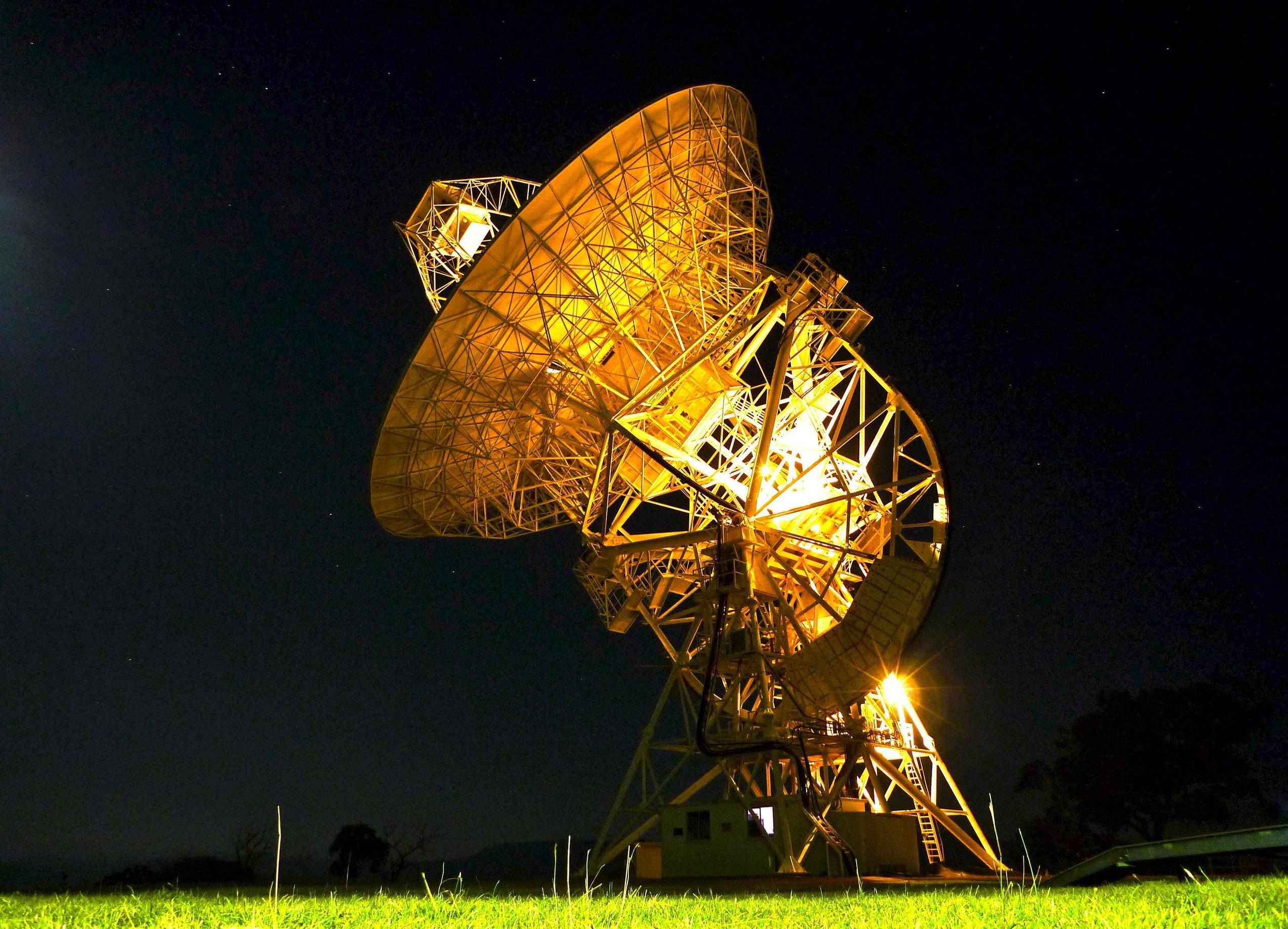
The Greenhill Observatory joined the universities other radio astronomy antennas including the Mount Pleasant Radio Observatory (pictured) in Cambridge, Tasmania

The Australian Maritime College (AMC) merged with the university in 2008. The merger helped streamline degree programs and improved provision of basic services at the combined Newnham campus.

The university formed the Institute for Marine and Antarctic Studies (IMAS) in 2010 to help integrate the Institute of Antarctic, Southern Ocean Studied, Tasmanian Aquaculture and Fisheries Institute, as well as the universities existing marine and Antarctic facility.

The Greenhill Observatory which houses a 1.27 metre optical telescope was opened in 2013 to replace the previous observatory at Canopus Hill, near Hobart. The observatory joined the universities two other observatories including the Mount Pleasant Radio Observatory and Ceduna Radio Observatory in Ceduna, South Australia.

=== Move to the city ===
In 2019, the University of Tasmania announced its intention to move from its Sandy Bay campus and into the Hobart central business district. As part of the plan, on 8 April 2019, UTAS acquired the K&D Warehouse along Melville Street, adding to the number of university buildings within the city centre. The warehouse was initially intended for accommodation, but following the release of the Draft Master-plan in May 2021, would be proposed as the new site for Engineering and Technology.

In 2018 the University bought the Forestry Building, a heritage-listed complex situated at 79–93 Melville Street, Hobart. The university reported in January 2023 that the Forestry building would be restored and given new life as an inner-city hub for the learning, research and collaboration. The project restored the living forest to the dome.

The master-plan includes targets for increased sustainability, community involvement, and better methods of transport into the CBD. The new city university precincts consist of West End, Midtown, Domain, Medical Precinct, and Wapping, with the old Sandy Bay campus to be transformed into a "world-leading example of a sustainable urban community". The transition is expected to take place over the next 10 years, with a priority placed on student and community satisfaction. The move to the city has attracted significant community opposition (in the local council area of Hobart City Council, in which the Sandy Bay campus is located) which has culminated in an elector poll being held on the issue in October 2022 at the same time as the Tasmanian local government elections. 74.38% of polled electors in the Hobart City Council area voted against the University's proposal to relocate. It is not known if the same concerns are held by the wider Tasmanian community, particularly those in the north of the state.

In August 2024, another education entity, National Institute of Education and Technology (NIET, Hobart Centre) moved in Old Hytten Building at the University of Tasmania Sandy Bay campus, which is partly repurpose for the University of Tasmania old campus.

== Campuses and buildings ==
The university has three main campuses based in Hobart, Launceston and Burnie. It also has a number of small, specialist facilities within the College of Health and Medicine at the Rozelle campus in Sydney. It also has a joint research facility at the city's Australian National Maritime Museum in Pyrmont.

=== Southern ===
==== Hobart ====
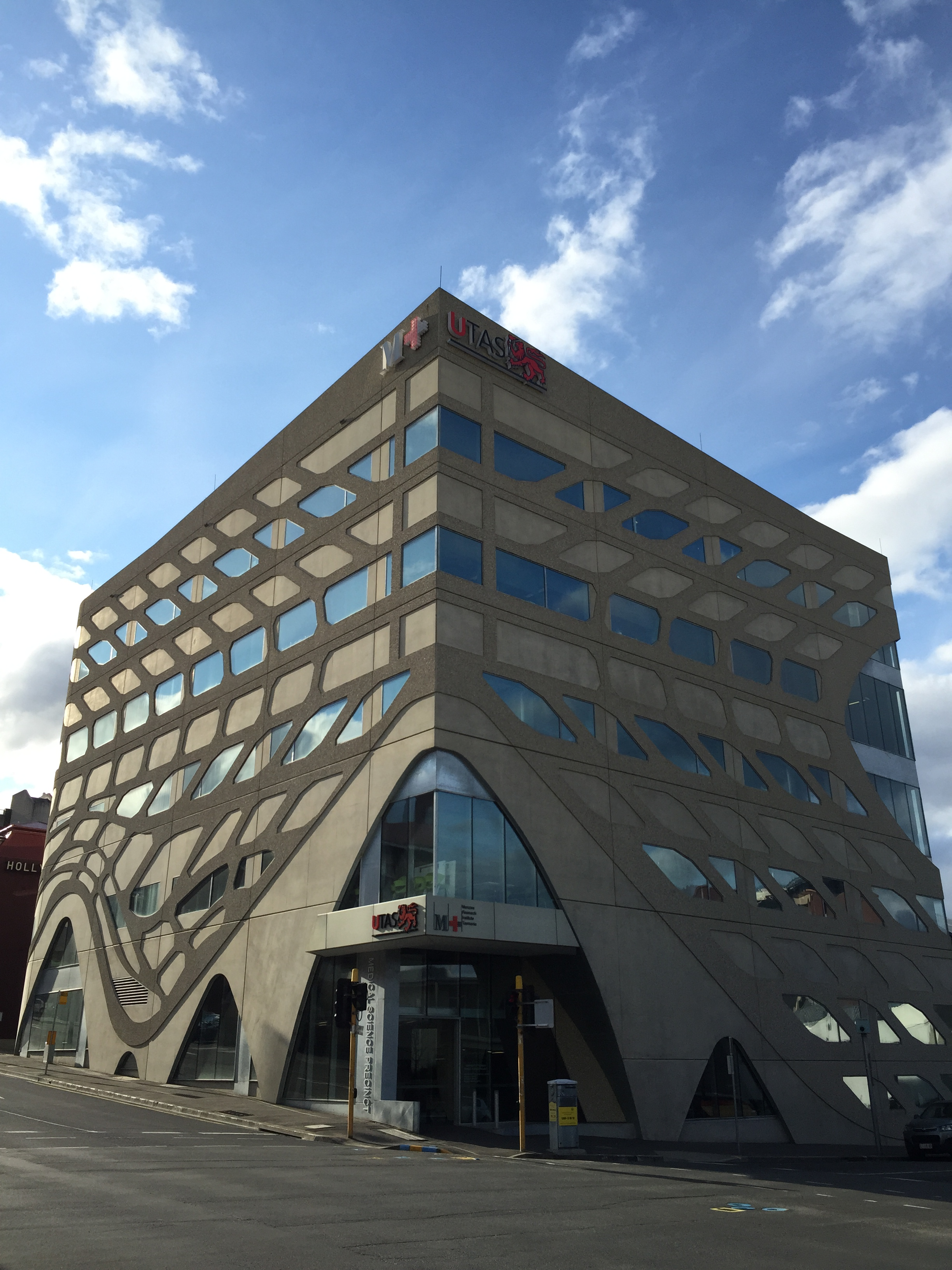
The MS1 Building of the Medical Sciences Precinct

- Tasmanian Conservatorium of Music (the Conservatorium of Music campus is no longer a public building; access to the premises by the public, students and staff is restricted).
- Medical Sciences Precinct in the inner city that encompasses the College of Health and Medicine and the Menzies Institute for Medical Research.

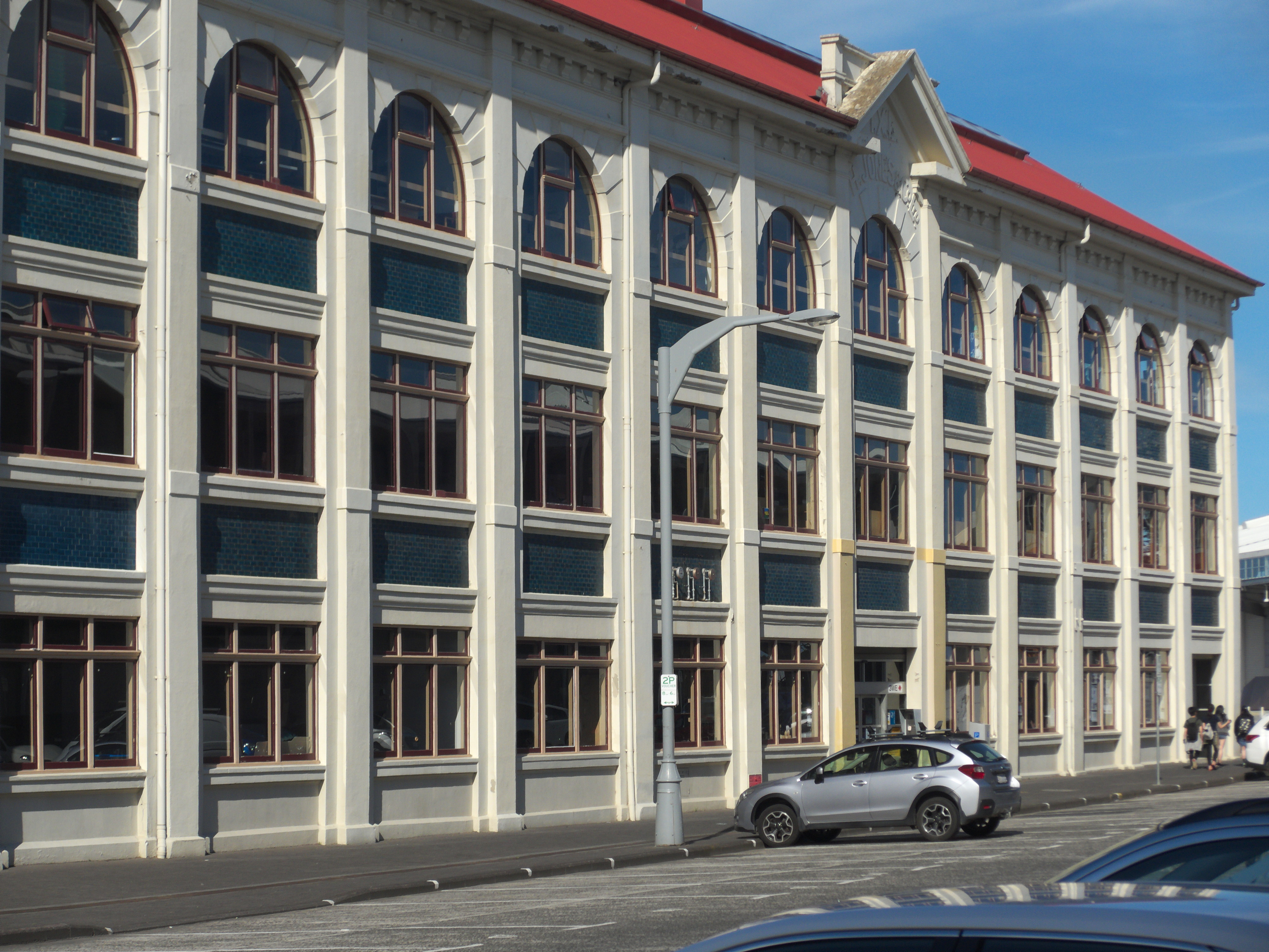
The School of Creative Arts & Media

- School of Creative Arts & Media based in the converted Jones & Co. IXL jam factory on Hobart's waterfront the campus hosts students and academics studying a range of art and design subjects such as painting, photography, drawing, sculpture, textiles, 3D Design and visual communication.
- Institute for Marine and Antarctic Studies (IMAS) campus encompasses research, learning and teaching on fisheries and aquaculture; ecology and biodiversity; and, oceans and the cryosphere. The campus is situated adjacent to the CSIRO Marine Laboratories, and is co-located with Australia's Integrated Marine Observing System (IMOS), the Antarctic Climate and Ecosystems Cooperative Research Centre (ACE CRC), and the Tasmanian Partnership for Advanced Computing (TPAC).
- Queen's Domain, the university's original site that encompasses the School of Nursing.

==== Sandy Bay and greater Hobart ====
- Sandy Bay – the Sandy Bay campus is set on 100 hectares of land in the suburb of Sandy Bay – about 35 minutes walk from the centre of Hobart. The Sandy Bay campus overlooks the estuary of the River Derwent and has the majestic Mount Wellington as its backdrop. Much of the upper campus is in natural bushland. Approximately 10,000 students are enrolled at the southern campuses.
- University Farm, a 334 hectare farm property located 20 km from the Sandy Bay campus and numerous other land parcels. The University Farm is set in the cropping and grape growing area of Cambridge located in the Coal River valley, serving the teaching and research needs of the School of Agricultural Science.
- Tasmanian Institute of Agriculture
- Institute for Marine and Antarctic Studies (IMAS) Taroona
- Mount Pleasant Radio Observatory is located adjacent to the University Farm, and operates a museum and radio telescope.
- Greenhill Observatory, near Jericho, Tasmania is astronomy observatory opened in 2013 to replace the Canopus Hill Observatory
- The Hedberg, a performing arts campus located adjacent to the Theatre Royal, Hobart.

=== Northern ===
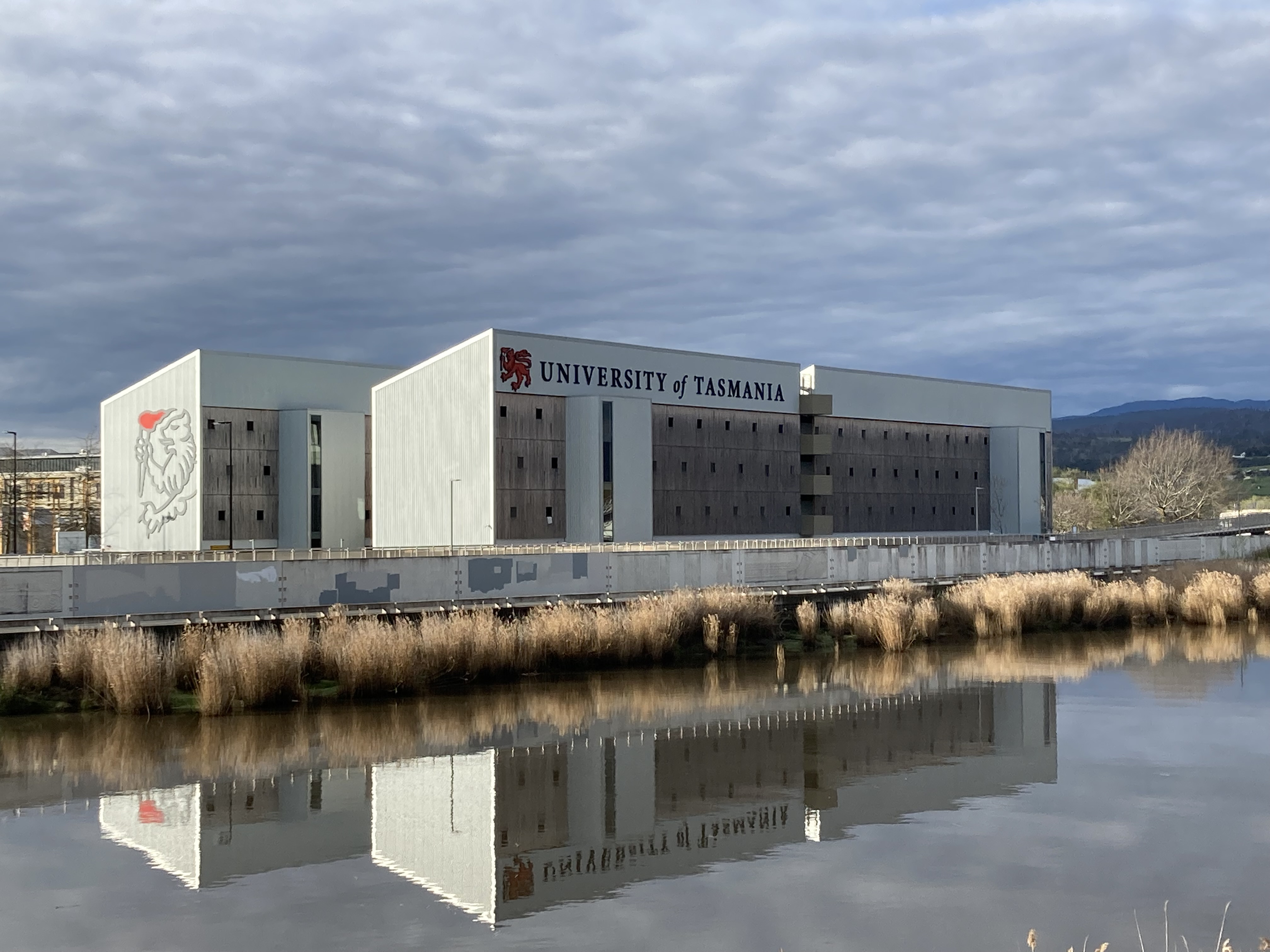
UTAS Launceston campus

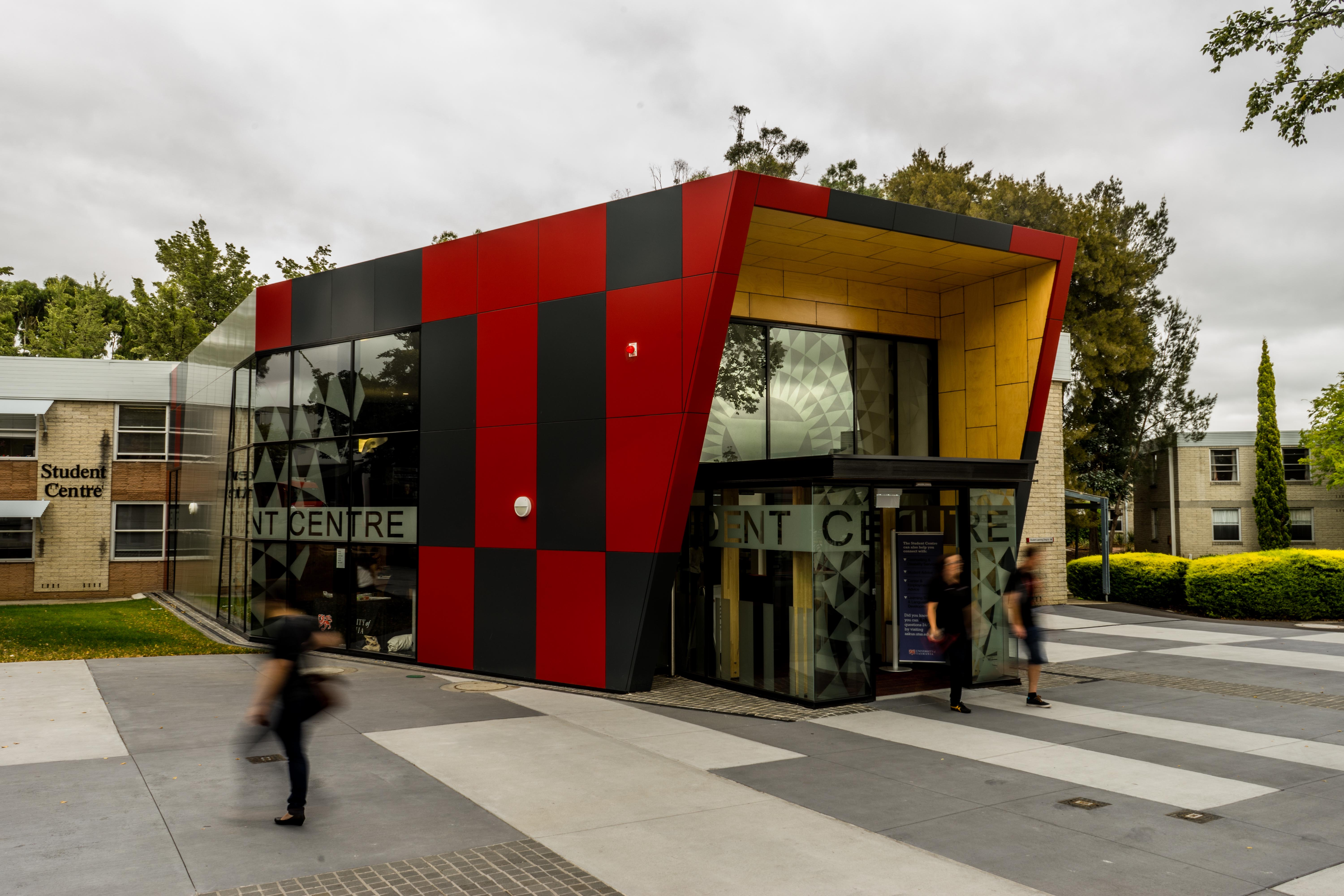
The Student Centre at the Newnham Campus, Launceston

- Inveresk – the Inveresk campus is Launceston's main campus (which has mostly replaced the previous campus based at Newnham that looked down to the Tamar River. Over 5000 students are enrolled at the Launceston campuses.
- The Australian Maritime College is located adjacent to the Newnham campus.
- The Tasmanian College of the Arts and the School of Architecture & Design are housed in the Inveresk Arts Precinct in Launceston, an award-winning 17-hectare inner city site comprising arts studios, galleries, performance spaces, a museum and specialist workshops. The Inveresk precinct is based on developed buildings from a disused rail-yards site. The majority of facilities and services previous based at the Newnham campus have moved into new buildings at Inveresk.

=== North-West ===
- Cradle Coast – established in 1995 as the North-West Study Centre, the now Cradle Coast campus in Burnie caters for researchers and students in the State's north-west. It underwent significant expansion in 2008.
- Rural Clinical School, the university's rural clinical school operated by the School of Medicine.
- West Park, is a new campus currently under construction for a 2021 opening. The modern building will have student accommodation, new learning facilities, community integration, and quick access to the nearby Makers' Workshop.

=== Sydney ===
- Darlinghurst – established in 2006, the Darlinghurst campus delivered nursing, paramedic practice and health management courses. These have now been transferred to the Rozelle campus.
- Rozelle – established in 2010, the Rozelle campus delivers nursing and paramedic practice courses, the latter being in association with the New South Wales Ambulance.

== Governance and structure ==
=== Academic structure ===
The University of Tasmania has five colleges, previously known as faculties, some divided into schools and institutes:

- College of Arts, Law and Education
  - Faculty of Education
  - Faculty of Law
  - School of Creative Arts and Media
  - School of Humanities
  - School of Social Sciences
- College of Health and Medicine
  - Menzies Institute for Medical Research
  - School of Health Sciences
  - School of Pharmacy & Pharmacology
  - School of Medicine
  - School of Nursing
  - School of Psychological Sciences
  - Wicking Dementia Research and Education Centre
- College of Sciences and Engineering
  - Australian Maritime College
  - Institute for Marine and Antarctic Studies
  - School of Engineering
  - School of Natural Sciences
  - School of Architecture and Design
  - School of Geography, Planning, and Spatial Sciences
  - School of Information and Communication Technology
  - School of Natural Sciences
  - Tasmanian Institute of Agriculture
- Tasmanian School of Business and Economics
- University College

The university currently holds the secretariat role of the International Antarctic Institute established in 2006 in partnership with 19 institutions in 12 countries.

A partnership between the university and the Cradle Coast Authority established the Institute for Regional Development at the Cradle Coast campus in 2005.

=== Heraldry and insignia ===
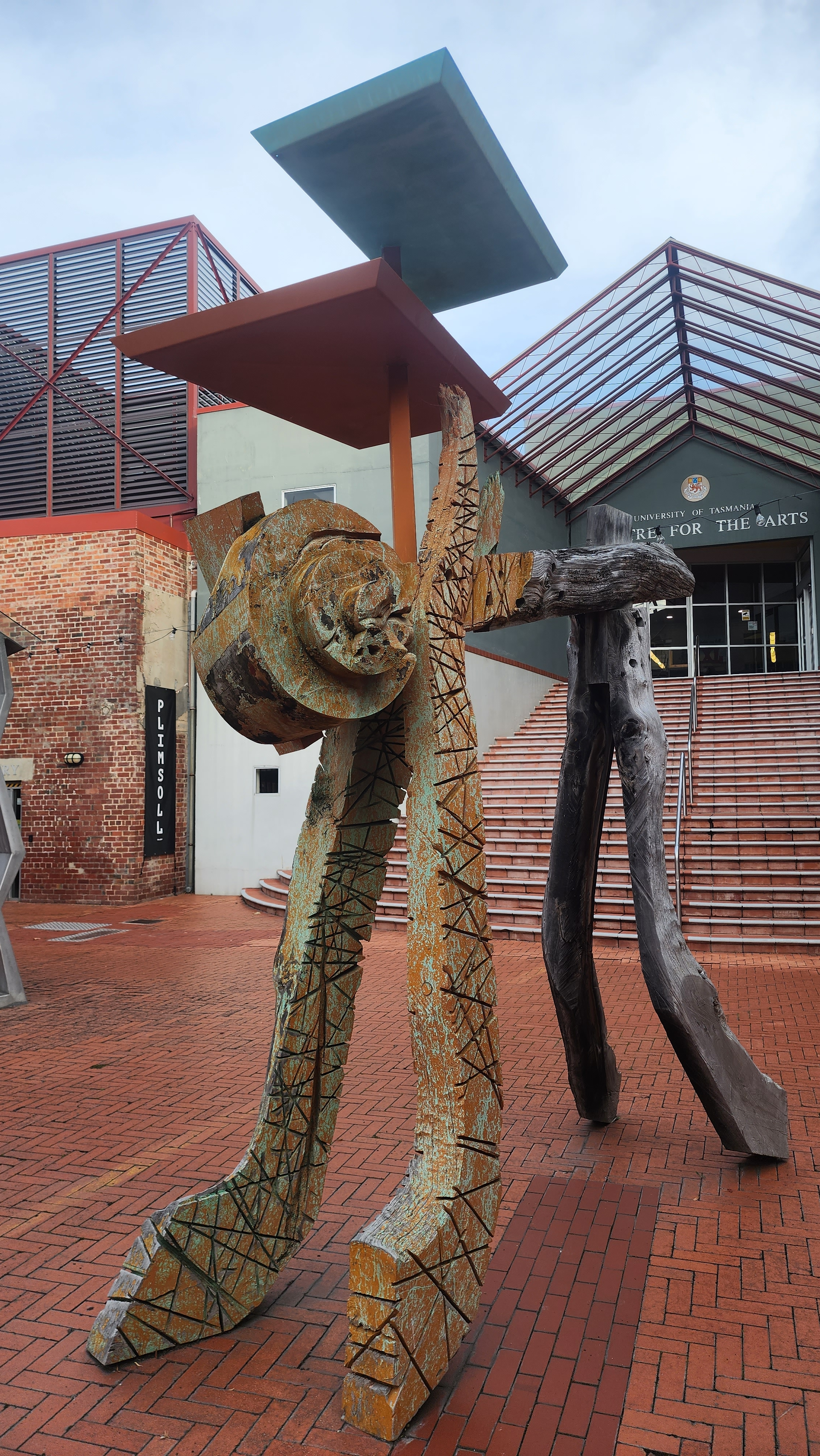
Sculpture at the courtyard of the School of Creative Arts and Media

==== Coat of arms ====
The Grant of Arms was made by the College of Arms. The blazon reads:

Argent a Lion passant Gules armed and langued Azure holding in its dexter paw a Torch enflamed Proper on a Chief Gules a Pale Azure fimbriated Or charged with a representation of the Southern Cross Argent between two closed Books clasped Or.

In 1936 the University Council ran a competition to produce a draft set of Arms to replace the common seal it had used since 1901, based on the badge of the Tasmanian Council of Education with the motto Floreat Tasmania (May Tasmania Prosper). The winning design included four key elements of the current Arms of the university including a lion (representing Tasmania), a book (representing the academic side of the university), a Southern Cross (representing Australia) and a torch (representing the athletic side of the university), over a crown (Or) (signifying the royal charter held by the university). The official coat of arms was granted by the College of Heralds in 1978. The core elements of the 1936 design were kept with slight adjustments made to comply with heraldic rules.

== Academic profile ==
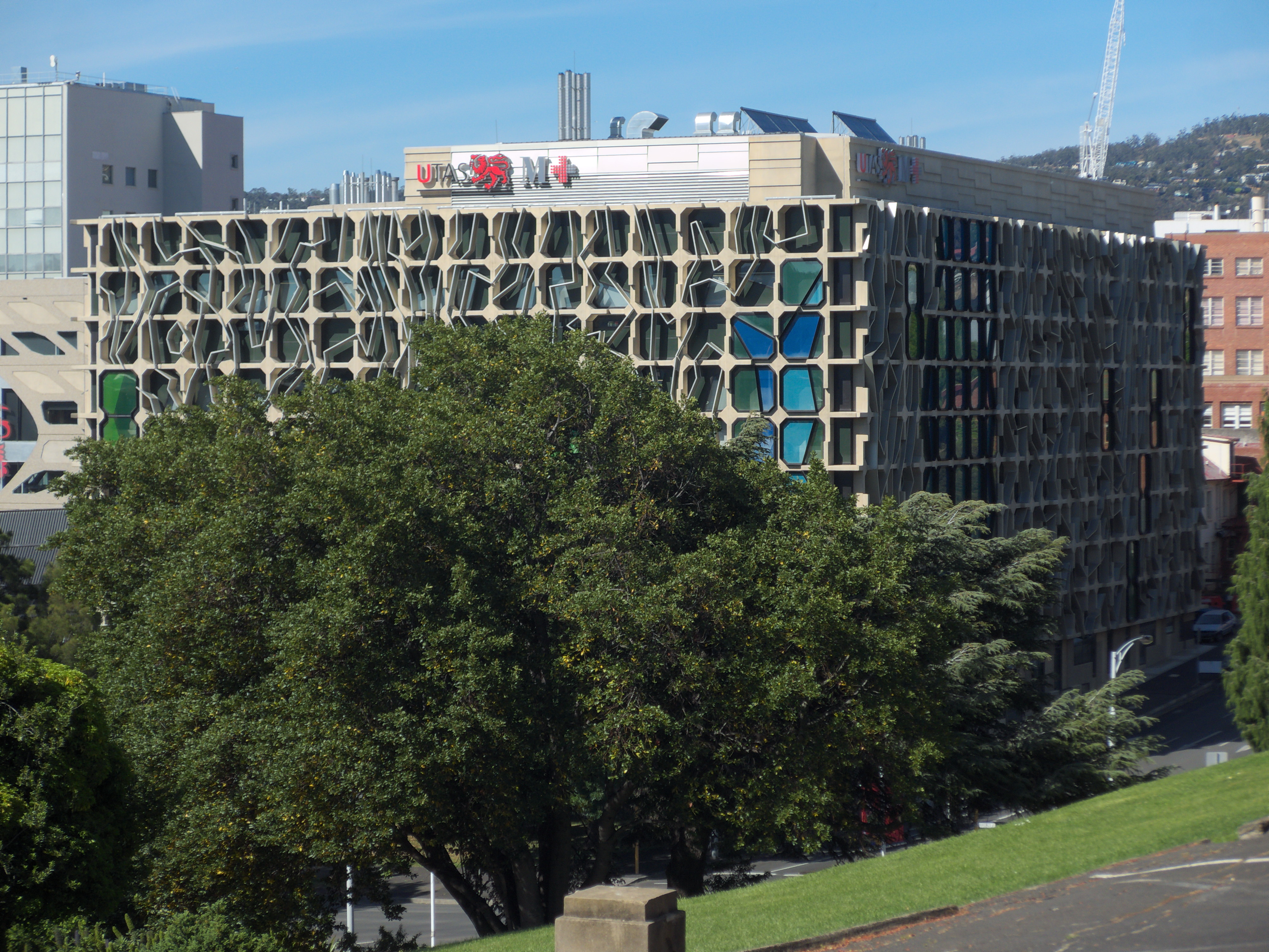
The MS2 Building of the Medical Sciences Precinct in Hobart part of the College of Health and Medicine

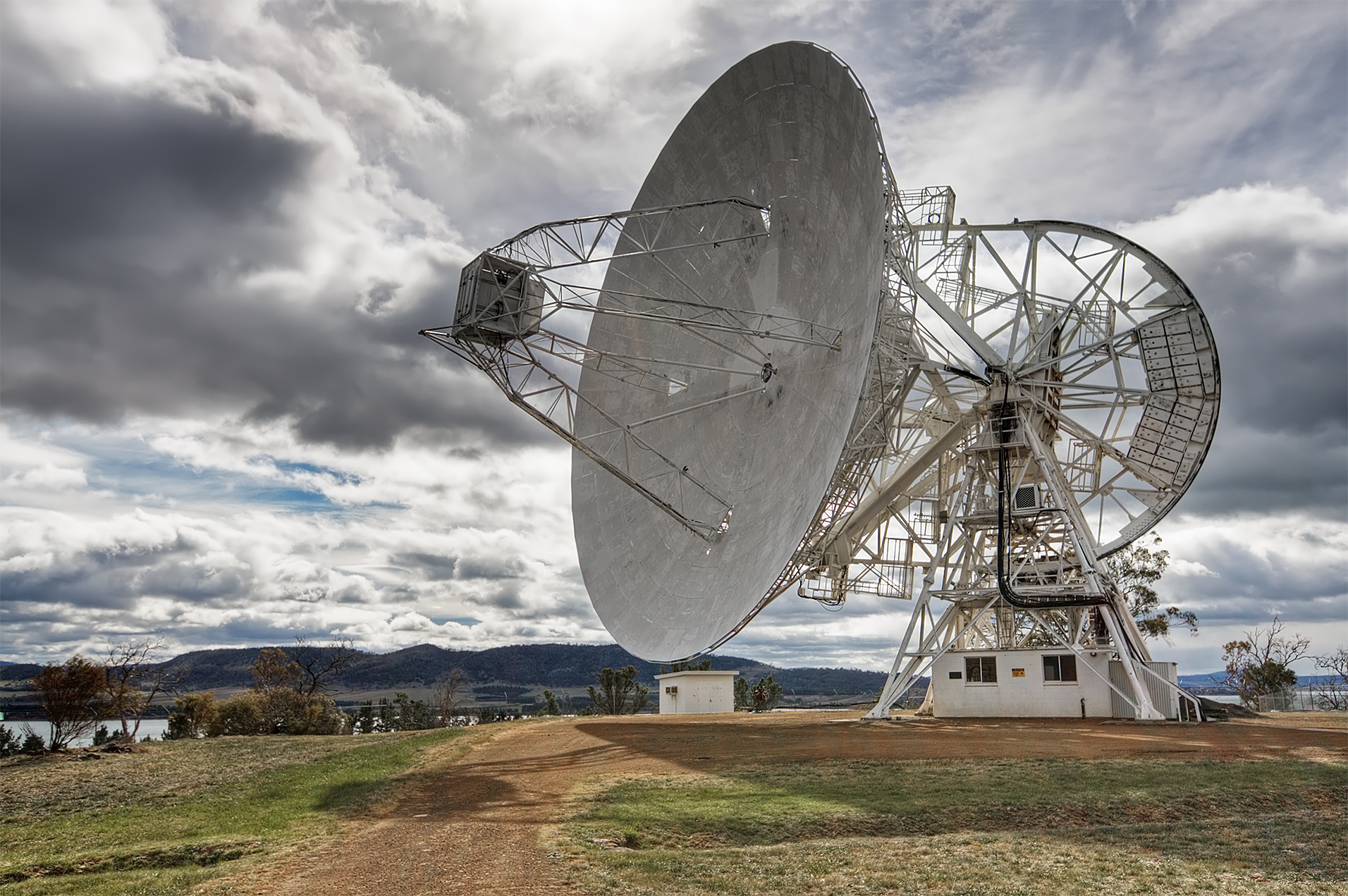
The Mount Pleasant Radio Observatory part of three radio astronomy observatories owned and operated by the university, and part of Australia's Very-long-baseline interferometry (VLBI) network

=== Research and publications ===
The university maintains five multi-disciplinary research themes that provide ability for interdisciplinary collaboration.

- Environment, Resources and Sustainability
- Creativity, Culture and Society
- Better Health
- Marine, Antarctic and Maritime
- Data, Knowledge and Decisions

=== Research divisions ===
- Institute for Marine and Antarctic Studies
- Menzies Research Institute
- Centre for Tasmanian Historical Studies
- Centre for Colonialism and its Aftermath
- Centre for Law and Genetics
- Tasmania Law Reform Institute
- Centre for Aboriginal Education
- Tasmanian Institute of Law Enforcement Studies
- Tasmanian Aquaculture and Fisheries Institute
- Institute of Antarctic and Southern Ocean Studies
- Centre for Marine Science
- Antarctic Climate and Ecosystems CRC
- Australian Centre for Research on Separation Science
- Australian Innovation Research Centre
- Centre of Excellence in Ore Deposits
- Tasmanian Institute of Agriculture
- Australian Food Safety Centre of Excellence

The University of Tasmania maintains close linkages with the Tasmanian Government and its departments, with the teaching hospitals, with the Tasmania Police, and with relevant industry bodies such as fishing and farming.

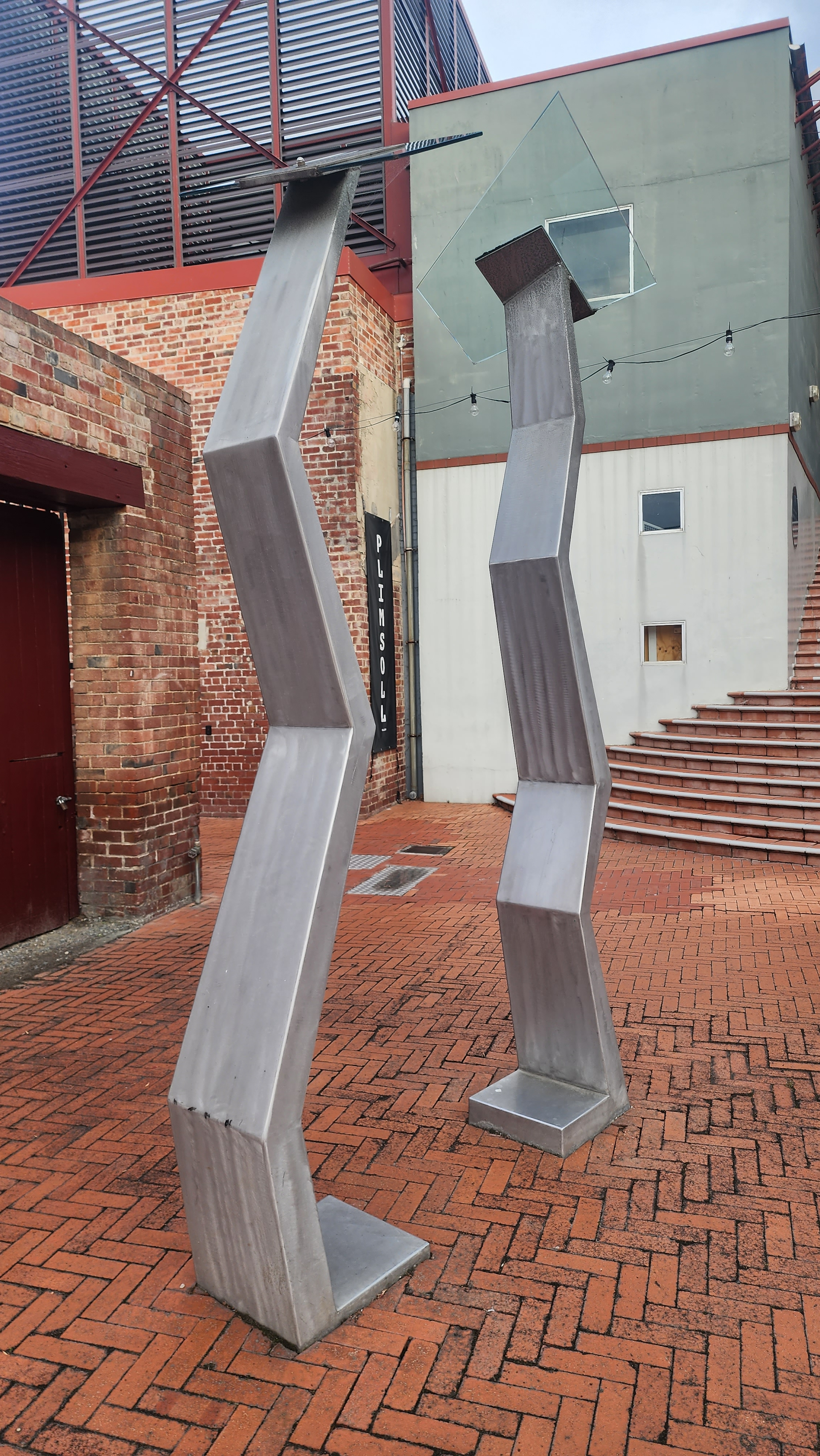
Sculpture at the courtyard of the School of Creative Arts and Media

=== Libraries and databases ===
The University of Tasmania library system comprises seven physical libraries integrated into a single library system:

1. Morris Miller Library (Sandy Bay) including Special & Rare Collections
2. Law Library (Sandy Bay)
3. Art Library (Centre for the Arts)
4. Music Library (Conservatorium of Music)
5. Clinical Library (Medical Sciences Precinct)
6. Launceston Campus Library (Newnham)
7. Cradle Coast Campus Library (Cradle Coast)

=== Academic reputation ===
University rankings

Global – Overall
- ARWU World: 301-400 (2025)
- CWTS World: 460 (Note: The CWTS Leiden Ranking is based on P(top 10%).) (2024)
- QS World: =314 (2026)
- THE World: 251-300 (2026)
- USNWR Global: =281 (25/26)

National – Overall
- ARWU National: 14-20 (2025)
- CWTS National: 20 (2024)
- ERA National: =12 (2018)
- QS National: 20 (2026)
- THE National: 14-20 (2026)
- USNWR National: 21 (25/26)
- AFR National: =22 (2025)

In the 2024 Aggregate Ranking of Top Universities, which measures aggregate performance across the QS, THE and ARWU rankings, the university attained a position of #253 (20th nationally).

National publications

In the Australian Financial Review Best Universities Ranking 2025, the university was tied #22 amongst Australian universities.

Global publications

In the 2026 Quacquarelli Symonds World University Rankings (published 2025), the university attained a tied position of #314 (20th nationally).

In the Times Higher Education World University Rankings 2026 (published 2025), the university attained a position of #251-300 (tied 14-20th nationally).

In the 2025 Academic Ranking of World Universities, the university attained a position of #301-400 (tied 14-20th nationally).

In the 2025–2026 U.S. News & World Report Best Global Universities, the university attained a tied position of #281 (21st nationally).

In the CWTS Leiden Ranking 2024, the university attained a position of #460 (20th nationally).

=== International collaboration ===
The university is an active member of the University of the Arctic. UArctic is an international cooperative network based in the Circumpolar Arctic region, consisting of more than 200 universities, colleges, and other organizations with an interest in promoting education and research in the Arctic region.

The university also participates in UArctic's mobility program north2north. The aim of that program is to enable students of member institutions to study in different parts of the North.

=== Student outcomes ===
The Australian Government's QILT (Note: Abbreviation for Quality Indicators for Learning and Teaching.) conducts national surveys documenting the student life cycle from enrolment through to employment. These surveys place more emphasis on criteria such as student experience, graduate outcomes and employer satisfaction than perceived reputation, research output and citation counts.

In the 2023 Employer Satisfaction Survey, graduates of the university had an overall employer satisfaction rate of 83.7%.

In the 2023 Graduate Outcomes Survey, graduates of the university had a full-time employment rate of 77.5% for undergraduates and 95.9% for postgraduates. The initial full-time salary was A$70,000 for undergraduates and A$100,200 for postgraduates.

In the 2023 Student Experience Survey, undergraduates at the university rated the quality of their entire educational experience at 76.6% meanwhile postgraduates rated their overall education experience at 74.4%.

=== Scholarships ===
The Tasmania Scholarships program supports the university's commitment to offer students equal learning opportunity. It assists students locally, nationally and internationally. Industry contributions now make up the backbone of the Tasmania Scholarships program. Around 10 per cent of all domestic students at UTAS receive some sort of scholarship or financial assistance. Scholarships are also offered under the banner of the Jim Bacon Memorial Scholarship, funded by the Tasmanian Government.

== Student life ==
=== Student union ===
Until 2008, there were two separate student unions: the Tasmania University Union (TUU) in Hobart and the Student Association (SA) in Launceston. Following the abolition of compulsory student unionism in 2007, the SA and the TUU amalgamated into one statewide organisation representing all UTAS students.

The TUU is responsible for the overseeing of all the university's many sports clubs and societies. Some of these include faculty-based societies providing academic and careers guidance; societies relating to various interests, such as the Old Nick Company; and various sporting clubs, including cricket, football, rugby union and soccer.

The TUU also publishes the independent student media at the University of Tasmania, Togatus.

Postgraduate students are represented by the TUU through the Tasmania University Union Postgraduate Council. The TUU Postgraduate Council was previously organised as the Tasmania University Postgraduate Association (TUPA). TUPA was established in 1982 to represent postgraduate research students on campus independently of the TUU.

=== Residential colleges ===
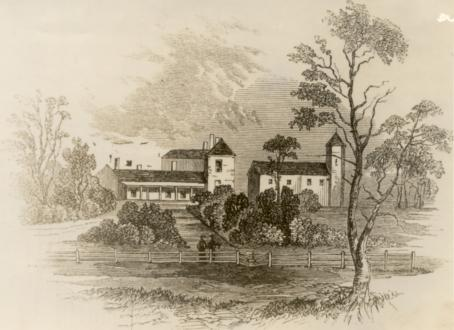
The original Christ College building in Bishopsbourne, 1856

The university maintains a strong residential college system, as well as providing more independent apartment-style living. A key aspect of campus life, the residential colleges are equipped with modern facilities and host several events during the semesters. The colleges also maintain their respective student clubs, key in the passing of traditions from one cohort to the next. The southern colleges annually compete in a series of sporting events including Rugby, Australian Football, Cricket, Softball, Basketball, Table Tennis, Tennis and Soccer.

The college system comprises Christ College, Jane Franklin Hall and St. John Fisher College, and Hytten Hall (originally open from 1959–1980 and re-established in 2023) in Hobart, and Kerslake Hall, Leprena and Investigator Hall in Launceston. The university accommodation system also includes the University Apartments in Sandy Bay and Hobart Apartments in the Hobart CBD, Endeavour Hall in Beauty Point for students of the Australian Maritime College, Newnham Apartments and Inveresk Apartments in Launceston, and West Park Apartments in Burnie.

One other residential college once existed in Hobart – Ena Waite Women's College (1968–1980), operated by the Catholic Church and located in central Hobart, which amalgamated with St. John Fisher College. An off-campus student residence in Launceston, Clarence House, operated from 2004 to 2008.

== Notable people ==
=== Notable alumni ===
The University of Tasmania has produced many notable alumni, with graduates having held the offices of Governor of Tasmania, Justices of the High, Supreme, Federal courts, Premiers of Tasmania and elected leaders of other states and territories, Rhodes Scholars, the first female professor in Australia, ministers of foreign countries, Lord Mayors, academics, architects, historians, poets, philosophers, politicians, scientists, physicists, authors, industry leaders, defence force personnel, corporate leaders, community leaders, and artists. There are over 100,000 graduates of the University of Tasmania, spanning 104 countries.

Ed Byrne, neuroscientist currently serving as Principal of King's College London.

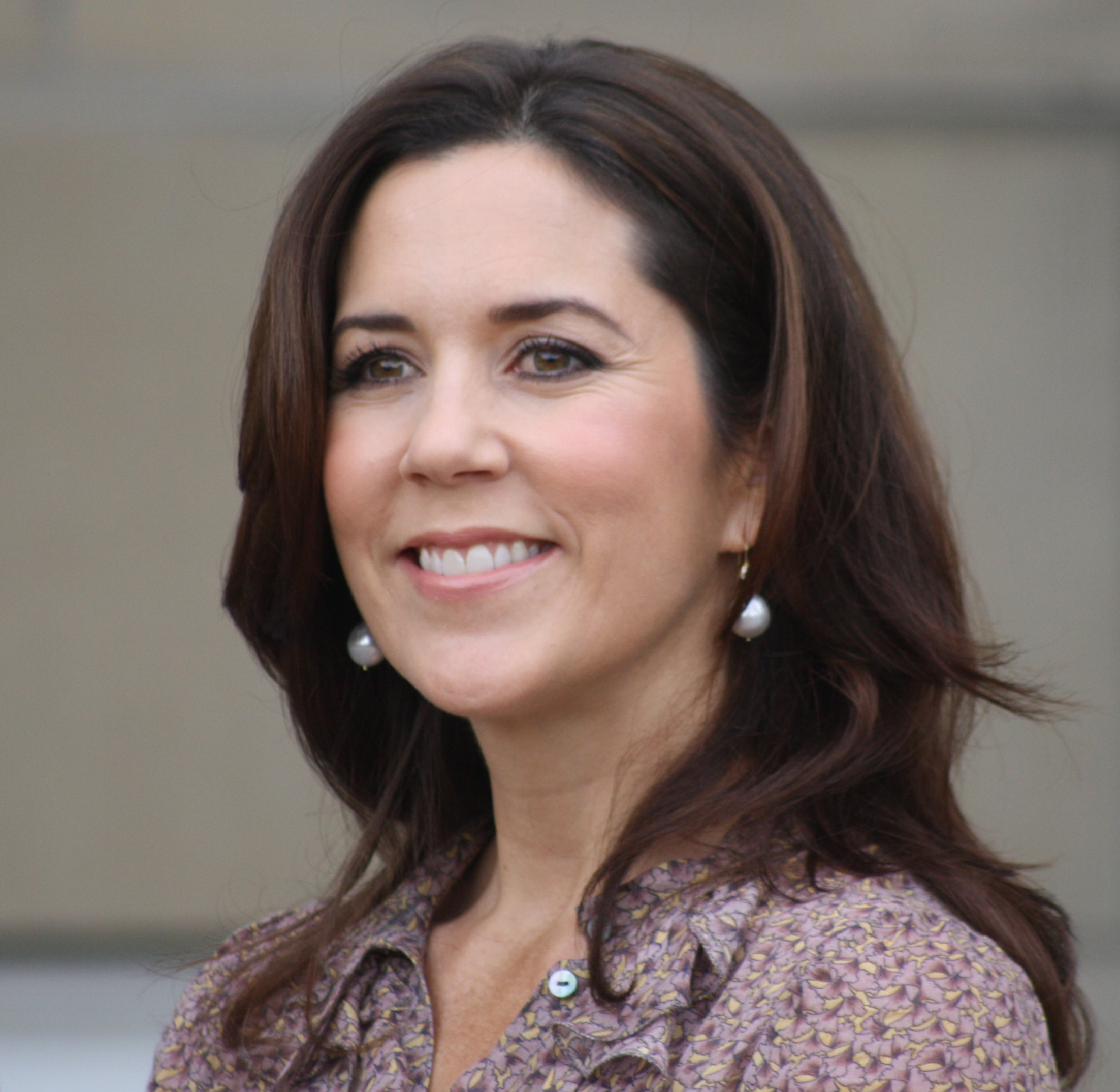
Queen Mary of Denmark.

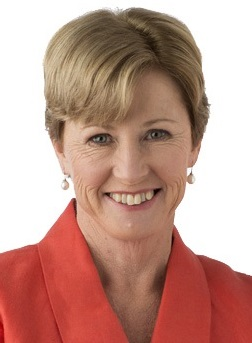
Christine Milne, Former Leader of the Australian Greens

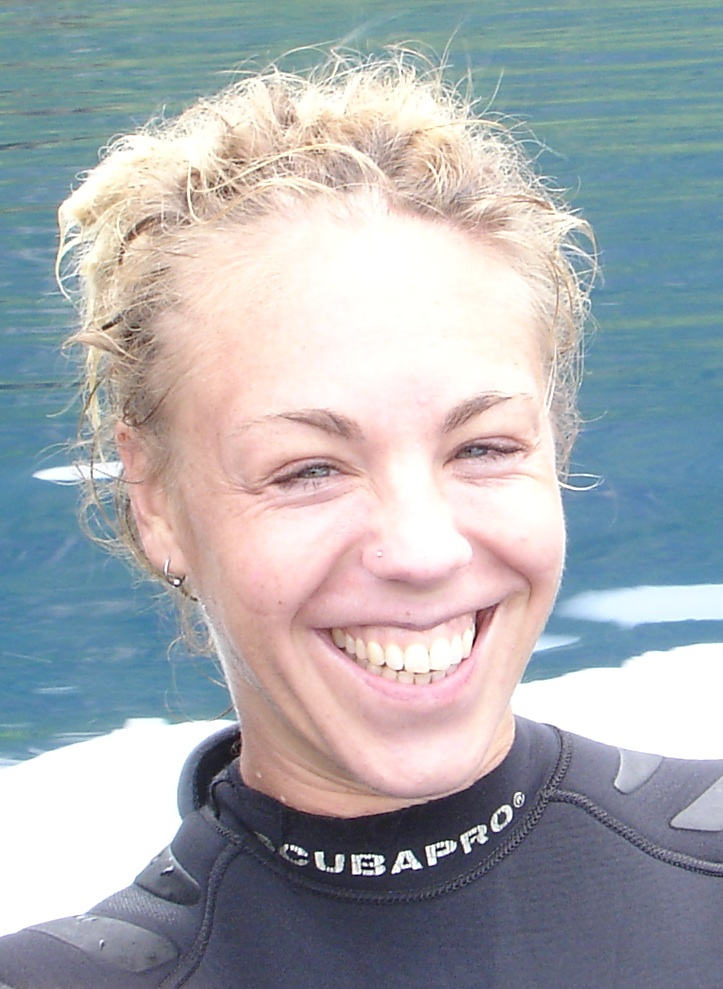
Jessica Melbourne-Thomas, Australian marine, Antarctic, and climate change scientist.

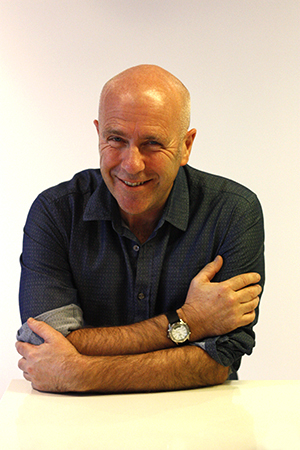
Richard Flanagan, Rhodes Scholar, 2014 Man Booker Prize recipient.

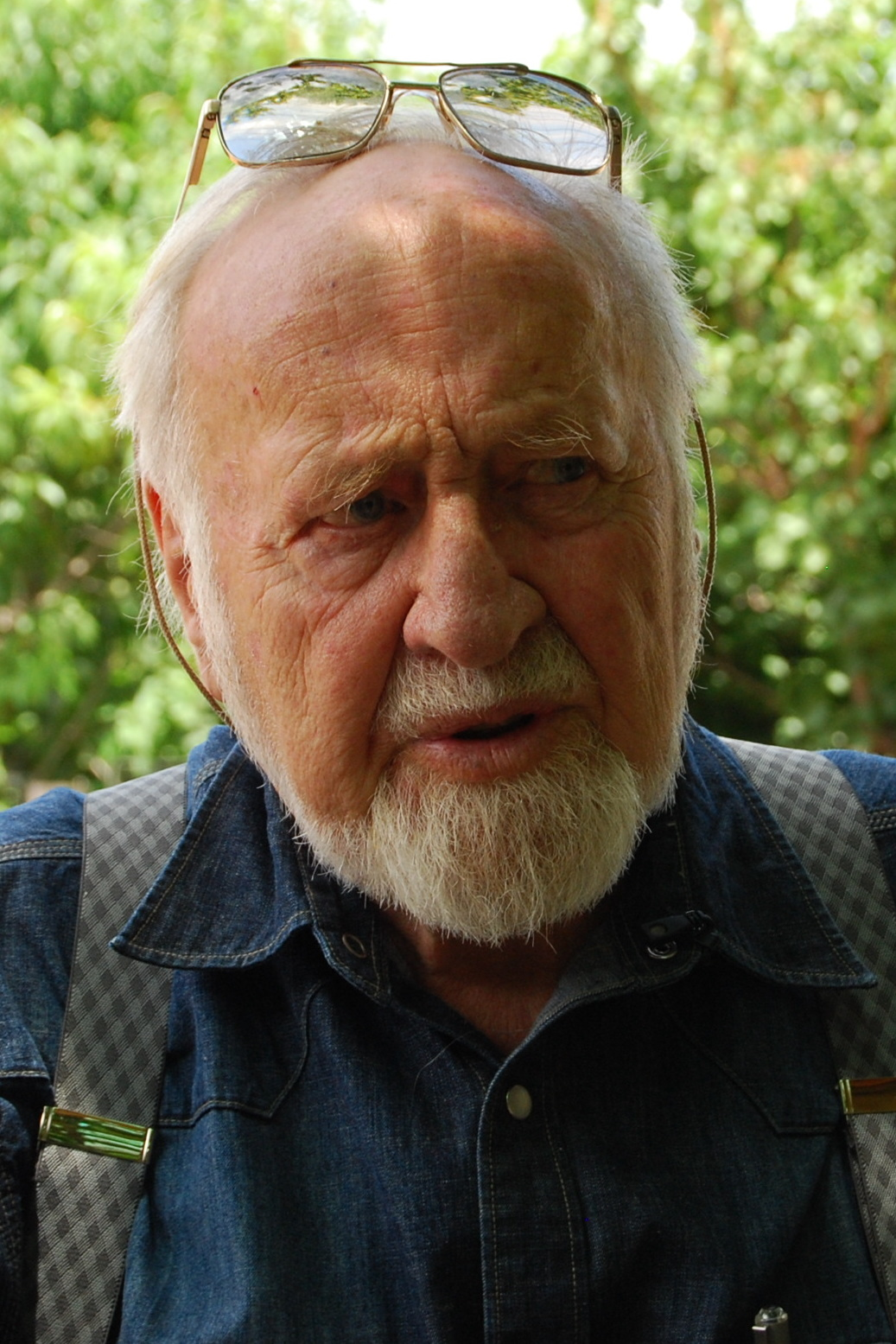
Bill Mollison, Australian researcher, biologist, permaculture theory and practice.

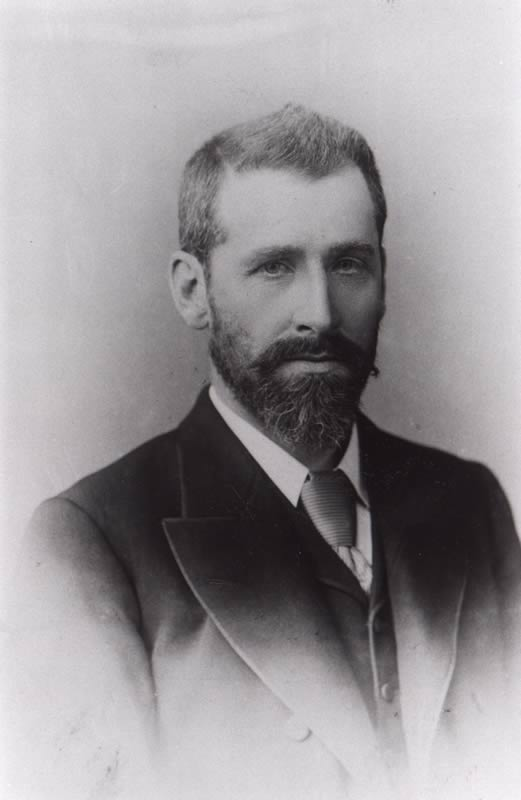
Andrew Inglis Clark, Australian founding father and co-author of the Australian Constitution.

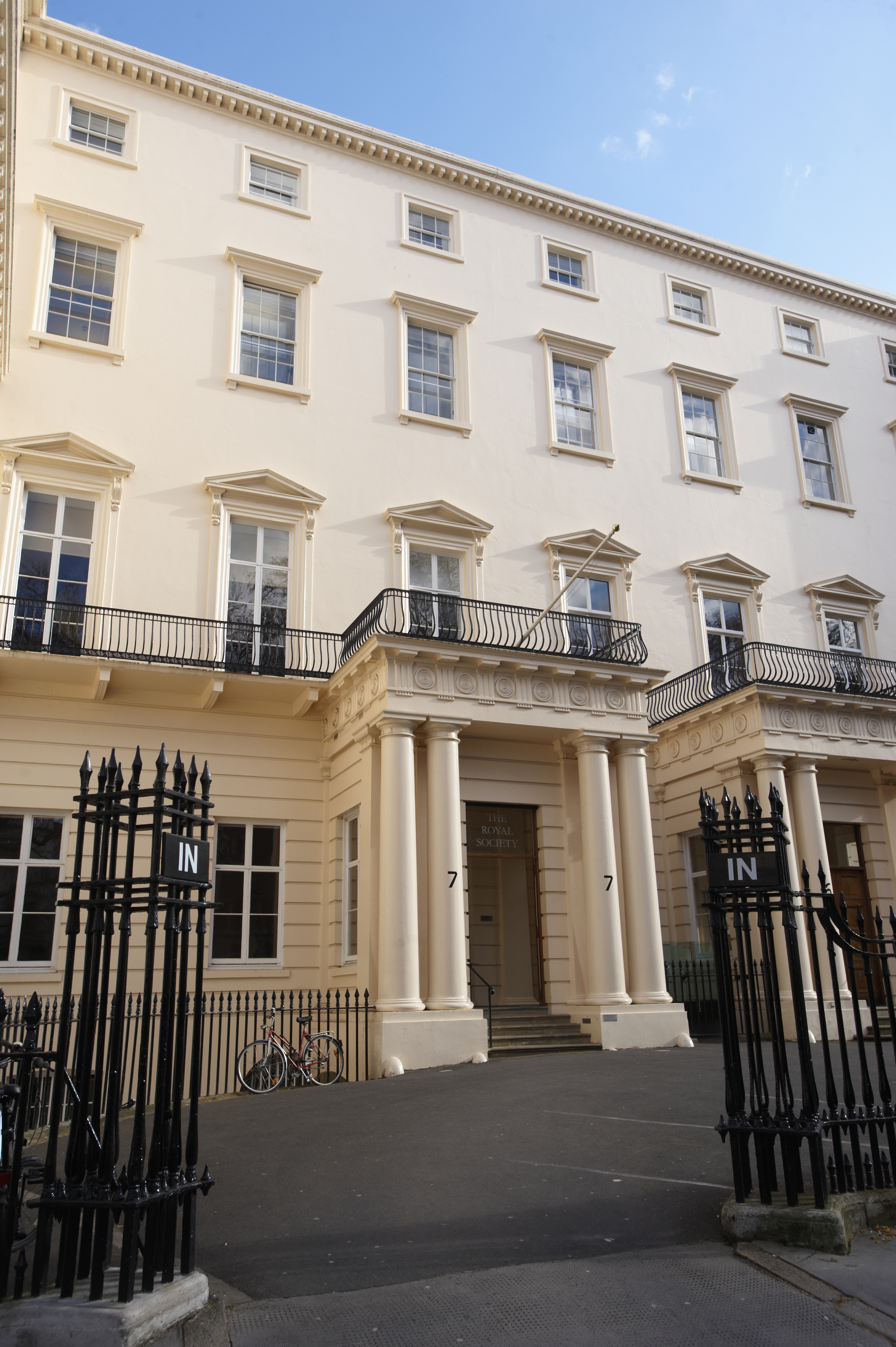
Noel Benson, research geologist, Fellow of the Royal Society.

== See also ==
- List of universities in Australia
- University of Tasmania Academic Dress
- University of Tasmania Prize, a literary prize for best new unpublished literary work by an emerging Tasmanian writer
- List of state-level unified TACs (Tertiary Admission Center), domestic students must apply once to the relevant TAC for admission to all the universities within that state.
- Tertiary education in Australia
