= Canopus Hill Observatory =

Observatory in Tasmania, Australia

- Alternative names: Canopus Hill Observatory, Tasmania
- Organization: University of Tasmania
- Location: Mount Canopus near Hobart, Tasmania, Australia
- Coordinates: 42°50′51″S 147°25′58″E
- Altitude: 260 m (850 ft)
- Established: 1970s

Telescopes
- unnamed telescope: 1 m reflector

The Canopus Hill Observatory, located approximately 12 km from Hobart in Tasmania, Australia, is an optical astronomy observatory belonging to the University of Tasmania (UTAS). Due to the high southern latitude, the Canopus Hill Observatory is able to observe and study the Magellanic Clouds. However, the observatory has closed down due to the "encroaching light pollution from the Hobart suburbs". According to the Astronomical Society, light pollution reduces the vision of the night sky, becoming a "major menace to amateur and professional astronomers alike".

== Telescope ==
The Canopus Hill Observatory has a variety of telescope instrumentation, including a 2-channel high speed photometer with UBVR, clear filters, a CCD photometer with SITe 512x512 pixel illuminated backside-thinned CCD and quick change 6-channel filter wheel. According to the UTAS, these telescope instrumentations are attached at the f/11 Cassegrain focus. There is also a 16" telescope that is used for observatory open nights for public viewing, photographic work and the Astronomical Society of Tasmania.

== See also ==
- Bisdee Tier Optical Astronomy Observatory
- List of astronomical observatories
