= Christ College (University of Tasmania) =

Residential college of the University of Tasmania

- University of Tasmania
- Seal of Christ College
- Location: Sandy Bay, Tasmania, Australia
- Coordinates: 42°54′19″S 147°19′8″E
- Motto: Jesus Christus esto mihi (Latin)
- Motto in English: Let Jesus Christ be mine
- Established: 1846 (as theological college) 1929 (as residential college)
- Named for: Jesus of Nazareth
- Former names: Christ's College
- Architect: Dirk Bolt
- Colours: Black, Gold, Blue
- Gender: Co-educational
- Director: Dan Wardop
- Residents: 285
- Mascot: Mighty Boar
- Website: christcollegehobart.com

Christ College is the oldest tertiary institution in Australia and is a residential college of the University of Tasmania.

The college is located on the university's grounds in Sandy Bay. The college, familiarly referred to as "Christ", is the largest of the three Sandy Bay residential colleges, with a residential community consisting of approximately 285 undergraduate and postgraduate residents, a significant number of whom are international students from Asia, Europe and the Americas.

== History ==
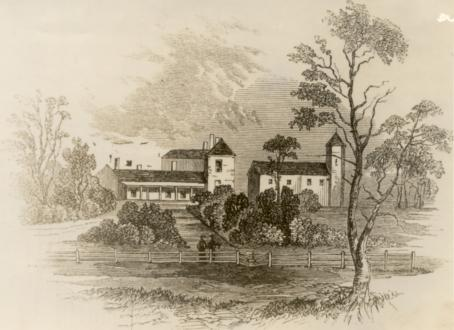
Christ College 1846–1856, Bishopsbourne

1840, Christ College was first proposed in Lieutenant-Governor Sir John Franklin's Legislative Council; 1846, it was later founded in Bishopsbourne, modelled on the Oxford and Cambridge colleges, as an Anglican college; 1856, the college closed due to bad financial conditions; 1879, the college reopens in Hobart; 1885, the institution moved to the Hobart High School premises on the Domain on a seven year lease; 1892, the lease was not renewed because of the foundation of the University of Tasmania; 1911, the college reopened as the matriculation section of the Hutchins School; 1926, The Christ College Act receives Royal Assent; 1929, a move of staff and students into an enlarged site in Park Street; 1933, the institution was formally affiliated with the university as its first residential college; 1971, the college relocates to Sandy Bay.

On 23 October 1974, Prince Charles visited the University of Tasmania. This included a garden party at Christ College.

In 2003, the administration of Christ College was taken over by Accommodation Services, which also administers St John Fisher College and the University Apartments.

In 2008, the college completed its first major refurbishment initiative since moving to the Sandy Bay site.

=== Buildings ===
The college's Sandy Bay campus buildings were designed by Dirk Bolt and are regarded as one of Tasmania's finest examples of post-Second World War Australian architecture. The college's design centres on four distinct buildings, each clustered around a central elevated courtyard, while still framing external views over Hobart and the Derwent Estuary. These buildings marked one of the earliest uses of concrete masonry for both internal and external finish, a style that became closely associated with the distinct Tasmanian architectural style of the 1960s.

Since moving to the Sandy Bay site in 1962, Christ College has been made-up of six residential blocks, each named after influential figures in the establishment and history of the college. As such, the six college blocks are named in honour of four former wardens, the first Bishop of Tasmania and an important benefactor of the college.

Gell: John Philip Gell was the first Warden of Christ College when it opened in 1846. He was born in 1816, and educated at Rugby and Trinity College in Cambridge before moving to Tasmania. In 1849 he resigned as Warden, returning to England to marry Eleanor Franklin (the daughter of Sir John Franklin). He strongly believed that the basis of the college's academic life should be its library, and one of his most notable contributions to the college is the original Christ College library collection. Gell was indefatigable in building this up from both his personal collection and those of his friends and family. Another reminder of him is his portrait (done later in life), which remains on display in the college's dining hall. He was succeeded as Warden by the Revd Philip Valpy Mourant Filleul of St Aubin, Jersey, Channel Islands, who held the post for four years before returning to England to become Vicar of Biddisham in Somerset. Gell was the inspiration for the original ‘old Brooke’ student and football-playing character in Thomas Hughes’ classic 1857 published novel Tom Brown’s Schooldays.

Barrett: William Rothwell Barrett was the founder of Christ College in its current form as a residential college of the University of Tasmania. Barrett was the first Warden of the college to be appointed after the Christ College Act of 1926 and remained Warden from 1929 until 1949. In 1955, Barrett became the Assistant Bishop of Tasmania, but remained closely involved with the university through his role in the establishment of Jane Franklin Hall, then the university's first residential college for women. His portrait remains on display in the dining hall of Christ College.

Dudley: Lancelot Stokes Dudley was appointed Warden of the College in 1953, having already served as Acting Warden in 1933 while William Barrett was in England. Contemporaries describe him as being a good scholar and an evangelical churchman, but also as humourless and a "shy quiet man" who may have been better understood by his theological students than by his undergraduate charges. Dudley remained with Christ College until his death from leukaemia in 1957.

May: The Rev. Canon (Emeritus) John May was himself a student of Christ College in the early 1930s, soon after its affiliation with the University of Tasmania. He returned to the college to be appointed Warden from 1958 to 1963, and again 18-years later in 1981. May was responsible for the college's move from Park Street to its present location in Sandy Bay, and was therefore closely involved in the design of the college buildings at the present site. In 1982, May became a senior fellow of the college, and his portrait remains in the Christ College dining hall.

Nixon: Francis Russell Nixon was the first bishop of the Church of England in Tasmania, and the driving force behind the foundation of Christ College in 1846. Nixon strongly advocated for the college's establishment despite the judgement of John Gell (the college's first warden), who felt that the college was not yet financially-secure enough to open. In this respect, Nixon can be considered indirectly responsible for the college's collapse in 1856, as a result of mismanagement stemming partly from his interference (in the appointment of a Bursar) and indifference (in failing to properly oversee the college trustees). In 1847, Nixon was described as "a remarkable man both in appearance and character, good-looking, coal-black hair ... piercing black eyes, and full, rather thick lips; tenacious of his rights, extremely anxious to be correct with regard to costume and all other points of etiquette, devoted to the fine arts and a beautiful draughtsman." Nixon's influence on Christ College is felt today in the community's celebration of the college's year of founding, as well as in the college's library collection, which retains a number of his books.

Toosey: James Denton Toosey was one of four trustees appointed to manage the affairs of Christ College after its closure in 1856. Born in England in 1801, Toosey studied cattle husbandry and moved to Hobart in 1826, where he worked on the Cressy estate of the Horse Breeding Co. of the New South Wales and Van Diemen's Land Establishment. Contemporaries describe him as kindly and hospitable, and celebrate his public spirit. When he died in 1883, Toosey bequeathed his property to the diocese with the request that it be used for the revival of the college. This included a portrait of the Duke of Wellington, as well as the bookcase and two large cupboards held in the conference room.

== Symbols ==
=== Motto ===
The college motto is Jesus Christus esto mihi ("Jesus Christ shall be mine" or "Let Jesus Christ be mine").

=== Seal ===
The college seal was designed by Captain D. Colbron Pearce of the Tasmanian Museum and Art Gallery. The seal, a symbolic expression of Dux Lux Rex Lex, is composed of the baton, torch, crown and book. These were incorporated into the seal design featuring a shield surmounted by a mitre after suggestions from the residents of the college.

=== Colours ===
The college is represented by the colours black, gold and blue . These are prominent in the sport jersey used by the college team.

=== The Rock ===
The Rock was brought to the college site from the quarry in Proctor's Road in 1962. It is tradition that the Rock be burned annually, but it is now so fragile that since 2006 this ceremony is no longer performed.

== Social and cultural events ==
The college holds many cultural and social events throughout the year and are organised by the social and cultural convenors.

In O-Week, the orientation program, residents are involved in get-to-know-you events, guided tours around the university, Sandy Bay and Greater Hobart, as well as trips to Mt Wellington and Port Arthur.

Each year the college holds a themed ball, a scavenger hunt and a satirical college play. Other events include various parties throughout the year, and residents can be involved with Clean up Australia Day, tree planting, the ANZAC Day dawn service, the annual play, World's Greatest Shave, winter sleep outs, movie nights, trivia nights, Relay for Life and various formal dinners.

The college also offers free tutoring sessions through Accommodation Services.

== Sport ==
It is a tradition that students from the southern residential colleges of the University of Tasmania compete annually in a series of sport events.

Christ College competes annually with Jane Franklin Hall and St John Fisher College in a variety of sports, with residents in non-affiliated residences such as University Apartments, Midcity Apartments, the Annexe and Old Commerce able to play for the college of their choice. Major sports consist of Rugby union, Australian football, cricket (men's) and netball (women's). Minor sports consist of soccer, badminton, table tennis, basketball, volleyball, netball (men's) and softball (women's). Debating is a mixed non-sport feature.

The College's rugby union side today possesses the oldest rugby provenance of any club or team in Australia, as in the 1847 founding era under John Philip Gell (as Warden) he and the students engaged in the earliest known instances of playing rugby football in Australia, fifteen years before the Sydney University FC. Gell was educated at Rugby School in the time of Thomas Hughes and was his model for the ‘old Brooke’ character in the rugby match in his classic novel Tom Brown’s Schooldays.

=== Major sports ===
Sport	'08	'09	'10	'11	'12	'13	'14	'15	'16	'17	'18	'19	'20	'21
Rugby (Men's)	1st	1st	1st	2nd	1st	1st	1st	1st	2nd	2nd	2nd	3rd	2nd	
Rugby (Women's)	2nd	3rd	1st	1st	2nd	2nd	2nd	1st	2nd	1st	2nd	3rd	2nd	
Australian Football (Men's)			2nd	3rd	1st	2nd		2nd	2nd	3rd	3rd	3rd	—N/a	
Australian Football (Women's)	2nd	3rd	1st	2nd	1st	1st		1st	1st	2nd	3rd	3rd	—N/a	
Cricket (Men's)			2nd	3rd	2nd	3rd		3rd	3rd	2nd	2nd	3rd	2nd	3rd
Netball (Women's)			2nd	3rd	3rd	3rd		2nd	2nd	2nd	3rd	3rd	2nd	

=== Minor sports ===
Sport	'08	'09	'10	'11	'12	'13	'14	'15	'16	'17	'18	'19	'20	'21
Tennis (Men's)						2nd		3rd	2nd	—N/a				
Tennis (Women's)						1st		1st	2nd	—N/a				
Badminton (Men's)	—N/a										3rd	3rd	—N/a	
Badminton (Women's)	—N/a										3rd	2nd	—N/a	
Softball (Women's)								1st	2nd	3rd	2nd	3rd	3rd	3rd
Table Tennis (Men's)								2nd	3rd	2nd	4th	3rd	2nd	
Table Tennis (Women's)								3rd	3rd	4th	4th	3rd	1st	
Soccer (Men's)								2nd	2nd	1st	1st	1st	2nd	3rd
Soccer (Women's)								1st	1st	2nd	1st	2nd	1st	2nd
Basketball (Men's)								3rd	3rd	3rd	3rd	1st	2nd	3rd
Basketball (Women's)								2nd	3rd	2nd	3rd	3rd	3rd	2nd
Netball (Men's)								2nd	3rd	3rd	3rd	3rd	1st	
Volleyball (Men's)							1st	2nd	2nd	2nd	3rd	3rd	2nd	
Volleyball (Women's)								1st	1st	1st	1st	3rd	2nd	

=== Sports records ===
Sport	'92	'93	'94	'95	'96	'97	'98	'99	'00	'01	'02	'03	'04	'05	'06	'07	'08	'09	'10	'11	'12	'13	'14	'15	'16	'17
Rugby (Men's)											1st		1st	2nd		1st	1st	1st	1st	2nd	1st	1st	1st	1st	2nd	2nd
Rugby (Women's)					1st						1st			2nd	2nd	1st	2nd	3rd	1st	1st	2nd	2nd	2nd	1st	2nd	1st
Australian Football (Men's)														3rd					2nd	3rd	1st	2nd		2nd	2nd	
Australian Football (Women's)														2nd			2nd	3rd	1st	2nd	1st	1st		1st	1st	
Cricket (Men's)														1st					2nd	3rd	2nd	3rd		3rd	3rd	2nd
Netball (Women's)														2nd					2nd	3rd	3rd	3rd		2nd	2nd	
Tennis (Men's)																						2nd		3rd	2nd	
Tennis (Women's)																						1st		1st	2nd	
Softball (Women's)															1st									1st	2nd	3rd
Table Tennis (Men's)																								2nd	3rd	2nd
Table Tennis (Women's)																								3rd	3rd	4th
Soccer (Men's)							3rd	1st																2nd	2nd	1st
Soccer (Women's)																								1st	1st	2nd
Basketball (Men's)																								3rd	3rd	
Basketball (Women's)																								2nd	3rd	
Netball (Men's)																								2nd	3rd	
Volleyball (Men's)																							1st	2nd	2nd	
Volleyball (Women's)																								1st	1st	

== Notable alumni ==
- Pip Courtney, ABC journalist
- Sir William Lambert Dobson, Tasmanian politician and Chief Justice of Tasmania
- Ross Hart, Tasmanian politician
- William Nevin Tatlow Hurst, Secretary for Lands 1925-1938
- Ian B. Tanner, President of the Uniting Church in Australia
- Peter Underwood, the former Chief Justice of Tasmania and Governor of Tasmania
