= Tasmanian Institute of Agriculture =

Research institute of the University of Tasmania

- Type: Public
- Established: 1996
- Affiliations: University of Tasmania
- Director: Professor Michael Rose
- Location: Hobart, Launceston, Burnie, Elliott, Forth, Tasmania, Australia
- Nickname: TIA
- Website: www.utas.edu.au/tia

The Tasmanian Institute of Agriculture (TIA) is a research institute in Tasmania dedicated to research and development of sustainable agricultural industries. Founded in 1996, it is a collaborative effort of the University of Tasmania (UTAS) and the Tasmanian Government. TIA is headquartered in Hobart with additional facilities including laboratories and research farms located in Launceston, Burnie, Elliott and Forth.

== Funding ==
TIA receives funding from its joint venture partners (UTAS and the Tasmanian Government) as well as agricultural organisations in Tasmania and around the world, agricultural companies and other funding bodies.

== Scope of research and development ==
TIA has the mandate to progress the agricultural industry of Tasmania through the provision of industry relevant research and development, encouraging the industry adoption of findings, and through the delivery of educational offerings relevant to Tasmania. Industries that TIA works closely with include dairy, broad-acre crops such as barley and wheat, vegetable production, wine-making [see Tasmanian wine] and grape growing, fruit, pyrethrum and poppies (for the production of pharmaceutical opioids). TIA has a close relationship with Australia's R&D funders such as Dairy Australia and DairyTas.

== Locations and facilities ==
TIAR (as it was known then) was established in 1996 and today it has research and teaching facilities at Sandy Bay and New Town in Hobart, Launceston and Burnie. Its head office is located at the University of Tasmania's Sandy Bay campus in Hobart. In addition, it has farm research facilities at Elliott and Forth.
