= Menzies Institute for Medical Research =

Australian medical research institute

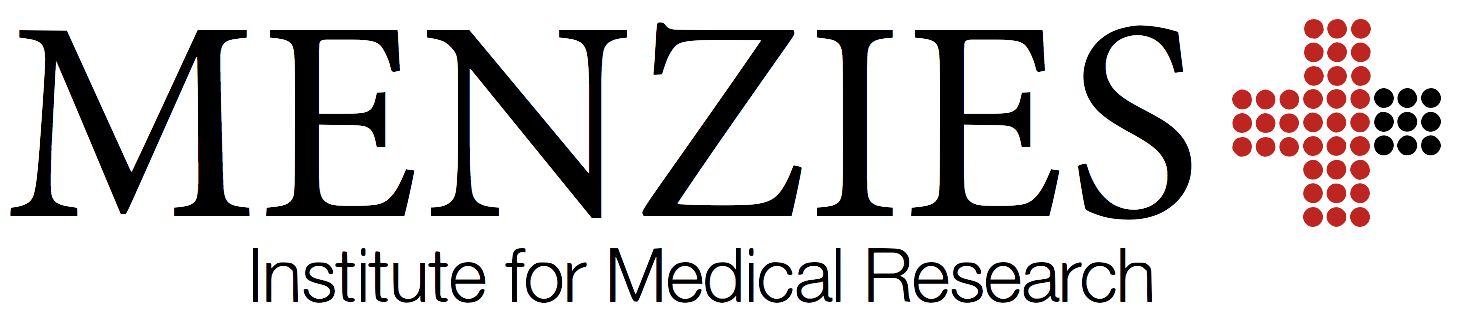
- Established: 1988
- Mission: Medical research
- Chair: Bruce Neill
- Head: Professor Tracey Dickson
- Faculty: University of Tasmania
- Adjunct faculty: Royal Hobart Hospital
- Formerly called: Menzies Centre for Population Health Research
- Location: 17 Liverpool Street, Hobart, Tasmania, Australia
- Coordinates: 42°52′42″S 147°19′47″E
- Interactive map of Menzies Institute for Medical Research
- Website: menzies.utas.edu.au

The Menzies Institute for Medical Research is an Australian medical research institute of the University of Tasmania based in Hobart, Tasmania. Formerly known as the Menzies Centre for Population Health Research, the institute was established in 1988 and conducts medical research to improve human health and well-being.

== History ==
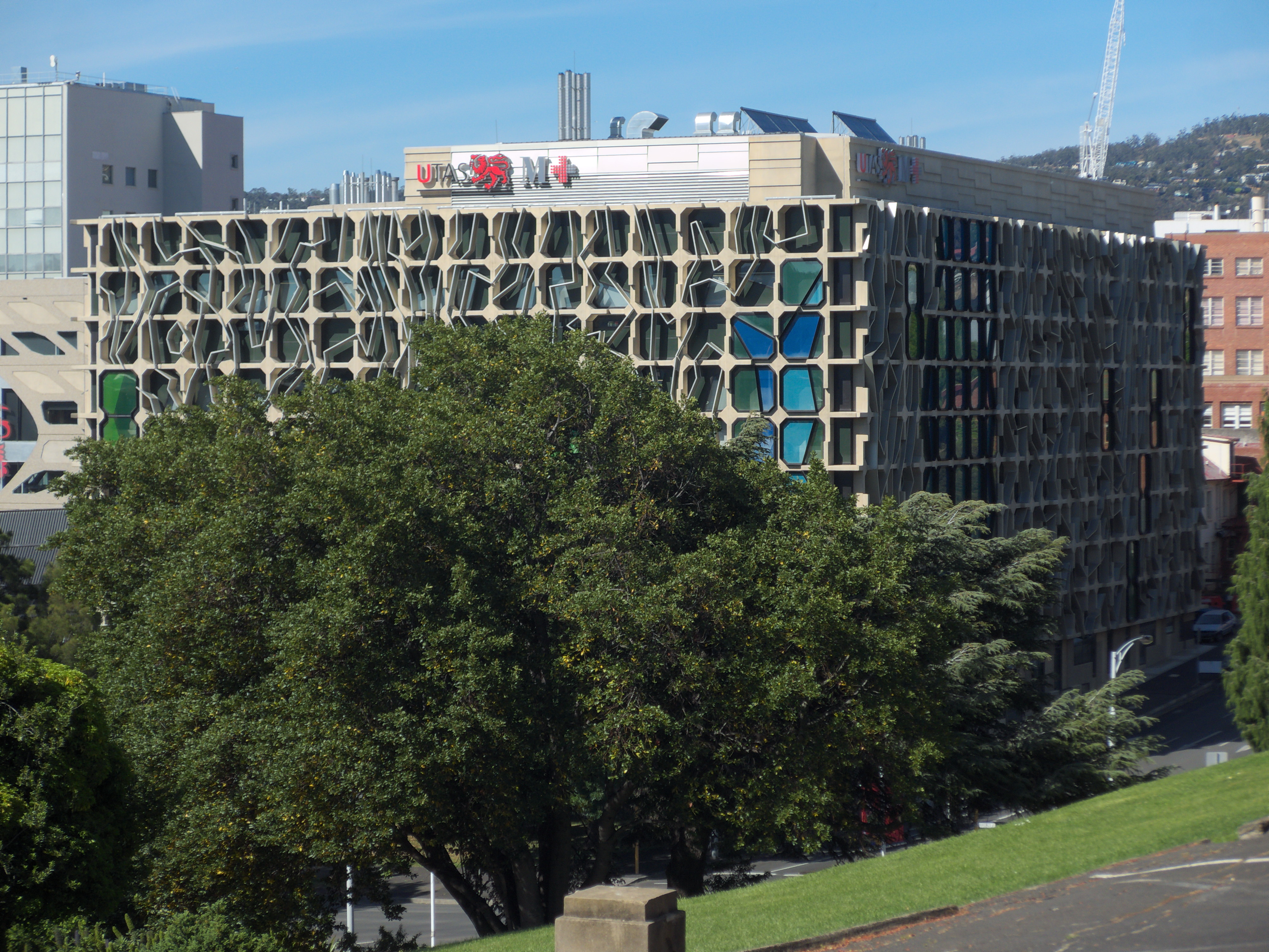
MS2 building on Bathurst Street

In the late 1980s, the Menzies Foundation supported the establishment of an epidemiology research centre at the University of Tasmania in Hobart, to be named the Menzies Centre for Population Health Research. The foundation provided annual funding to the institute and was successful in obtaining matching funds from the Tasmanian government. The Menzies Centre for Population Health Research was formed in 1988 and became the Menzies Research Institute in 2004.

From modest beginnings, the Menzies Research Institute quickly gained a reputation for its ground-breaking work into the link between babies’ sleeping position and sudden infant death syndrome (SIDS). Menzies developed into an established centre for population health research, with a global reputation in epidemiology. Some notable successes included highlighting the importance of vitamin D in the development of bones in children and adults; showing evidence of the link between early life sun exposure and susceptibility to multiple sclerosis; and discovering platelets found in the blood kill the malaria parasite during the early stages of a malarial infection.

== Current research ==
Its research efforts focus on preventing a range of diseases including cancer, multiple sclerosis, cardiovascular disease, diabetes, chronic lung disease, osteoarthritis, osteoporosis, epilepsy and dementia.

The institute's five major research themes are public health and primary care, brain diseases and injury, heart and blood vessels, bone and muscle health, and cancer, genetics and immunology.

== Research Themes ==
The Menzies Research Institute for Medical Research addresses Tasmania's high rates of preventable chronic disease and the social factors that affect health, leveraging Tasmania’s unique genealogical resources that support genetic research under 5 research themes:

1. Brain health (including the Multiple Sclerosis Research Flagship)
2. Cardiovascular health (including the Cardiovascular Research Flagship)
3. Environmental and respiratory health
4. Prevention, health services, wellbeing
5. Cancer and genomics

== Research centres ==
The Menzies Research Institute for Medical Research has two research centres; the Australian Cancer Research Foundation Tasmanian Inherited Cancer Centre and the Wicking Dementia and Research Education Centre.

== See also ==
- Health in Australia
