= St. John Fisher College (University of Tasmania) =

Residential college in Tasmania

John Fisher College
- Residential college
- University of Tasmania
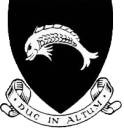
- Location: Upper Sandy Bay Hobart, Tasmania, Australia
- Coordinates: 42.906°S 147.320°E
- Motto: Latin: Duc in Altum
- Motto in English: Cast your nets into deeper waters
- Established: 1963
- Named for: St John Fisher
- Colors: Royal blue, white
- Rector: Dan Wardrop
- Undergraduates: 100 (2013)
- Postgraduates: 11 (2013)
- Mascot: Hellfish
- Website: www.johnfishercollegetas.squarespace.com

St. John Fisher College, known simply as John Fisher College and familiarly referred to as "Fisher", is a residential college of the University of Tasmania. It was established in 1963 by the Archbishop of Hobart Sir Guilford Young and built by the Catholic Church and its community. The building was designed by notable Tasmanian architect Rod Cooper. The college was named after 16th century scholar St John Fisher and provides accommodation for around 110 students. It is located in Upper Sandy Bay, Tasmania, Australia, on campus at the University of Tasmania.

It is the smallest of the four residential colleges at the University of Tasmania in Hobart. The college was originally all-male, but became co-residential in 1980 when it amalgamated with Ena Waite College. Ena Waite was an all-female residential college staffed by the Dominican and Loreto sisters, and operated from 1968 to 1980. It was located at Currievale House at 63 Goulburn Street, West Hobart. The building was subsequently sold, and residents moved to John Fisher College. In 1999, ownership of John Fisher College was transferred from the Catholic Church to the University of Tasmania.

== Today ==
In 2011, the college completed an extensive renovation period. In March 2009 the Vice Chancellor officially opened "Pepperz" restaurant and cafe bar, located next to the entrance of Fisher, marking the transition of John Fisher College from catered to self-catered accommodation.

The St. John Fisher College Student Club provides representation for the members of the college. The Student Club holds events throughout the year for college residents, such as the Vatican Ball, pub crawls, an annual boat cruise, tours of the university, barbecues, and a significant O-Week orientation program.

The college offers free tutoring services on a number of subjects through Accommodation Services.

== College spirit and sport ==
Every year, John Fisher College competes with Jane Franklin Hall, Christ College and Hytten Hall in inter-college sports. John Fisher College colours are royal blue and white, and the playing uniforms for sports feature the "Vatican V" crest. The college mascot is the Hellfish. Sports played include rugby, Australian rules football, soccer, netball, cricket, basketball, badminton, tennis, table tennis, volleyball and debating.

== Rooms and facilities ==
There are 110 rooms at John Fisher College. They are spread over four floors, A-D Floor, as well as E-Wing which is on the other side of Pepperz. The main common room is on B Floor, as well as the "O'Sulley", a study space. John Fisher College is the only residential college in Hobart where all residents are housed in one building.

== Notable alumni ==
- Damian Bugg AM QC, former Commonwealth and Tasmanian DPP and UTAS Chancellor
- Michael Field AC, former Premier of Tasmania and former UTAS Chancellor
- Brendon Gale, former AFL player and current CEO of Richmond
- Tim Lane, sports journalist
- Christine Milne, leader of the Australian Greens (attended Ena Waite College)
- Michael Tate AO, Catholic priest, law professor and former Labor politician
- Patrick Quilty, Antarctic scientist
- Richard Cogswell, Rhodes Scholar and NSW District Court judge
