= Institute for Marine and Antarctic Studies =

Teaching and research institute of the University of Tasmania

Coordinates: 42°53′10.19″S 147°20′8.76″E

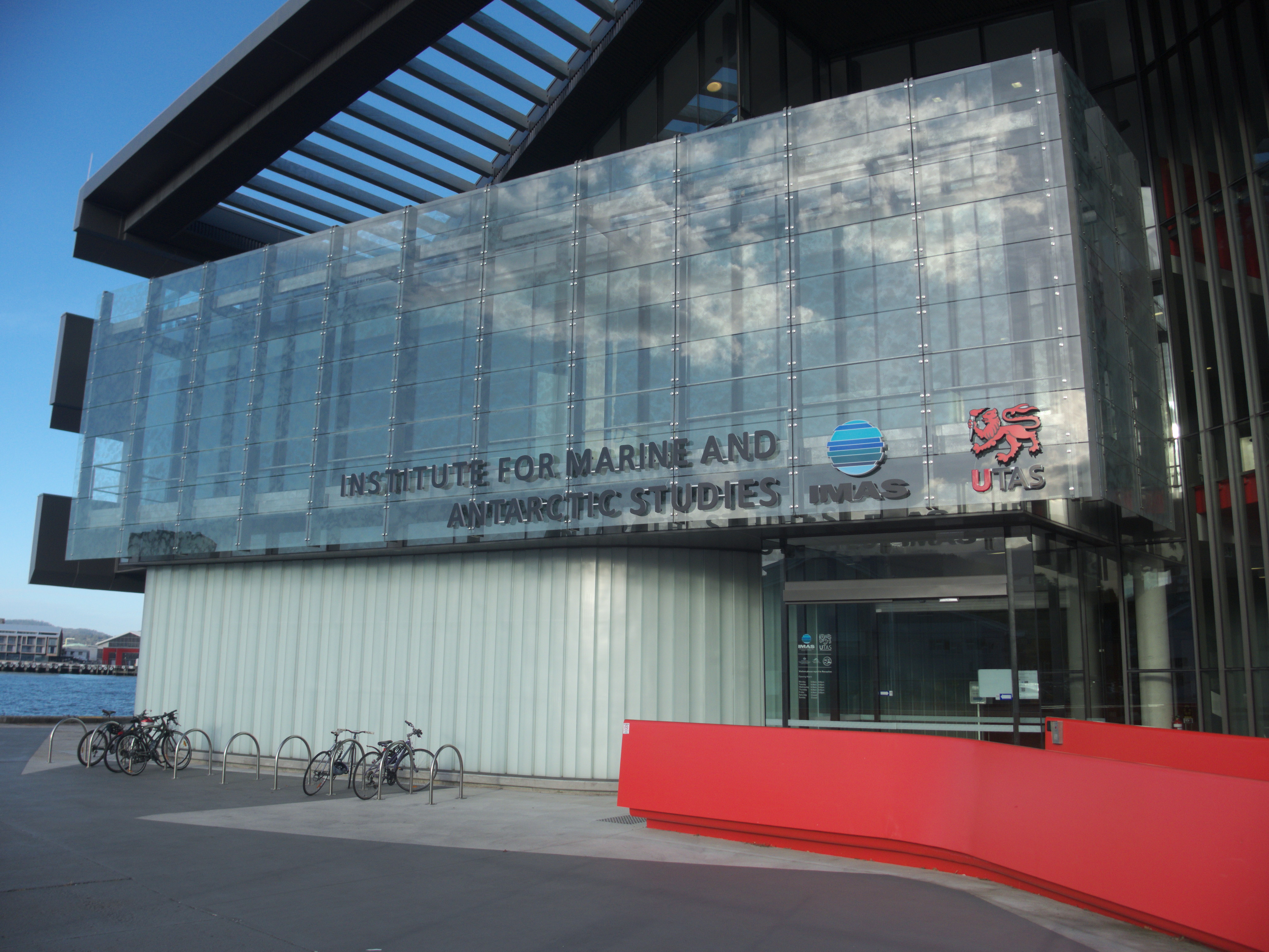
- Type: Public
- Established: 2009
- Affiliations: University of Tasmania
- Chairman: Mary O’Kane
- Chancellor: Michael Field AC
- Vice-Chancellor: Rufus Black
- Director: Nicole Webster
- Location: Hobart, Tasmania, Australia
- Nickname: IMAS
- Website: www.imas.utas.edu.au

The Institute for Marine and Antarctic Studies (IMAS) is a teaching and research institute of the University of Tasmania in Hobart, Tasmania. IMAS was established in 2010, building upon the university's partnership with CSIRO Oceans and Atmosphere and the Australian Antarctic Division in cooperative Antarctic research and Southern Ocean research.

Marine geophysicist Prof. Mike Coffin was appointed founding Executive Director of IMAS in 2010. Prof. Richard Coleman, an oceanographer and cryospheric scientist, was appointed Executive Director of IMAS in July 2015. Terry Bailey was the Executive Director from July 2019 to 2022. The current Executive Director is Nicole Webster.

== Research themes ==
The Institute aims "to improve understanding of temperate marine, Southern Ocean, and Antarctic environments, their resources, and their roles in the global climate system through research, education, and outreach". IMAS was established with a core research and education capability, through expertise in the following foundation themes: Fisheries and aquaculture, Ecology and biodiversity, and Oceans and cryosphere. These programs are linked by three key cross-disciplinary themes to meet integrative and multidisciplinary research goals: Climate change, Ocean-Earth systems, and Oceans and Antarctic governance

The Australian Research Council's (ARC) Excellence in Research for Australia (ERA) initiatives provide a specific benchmark for the core IMAS disciplines of oceanography and fisheries sciences, and in 2012 IMAS contributed to the University of Tasmania achieving grade 5 scores in oceanography, ecology, and geology, and in fisheries sciences.

== Facilities ==
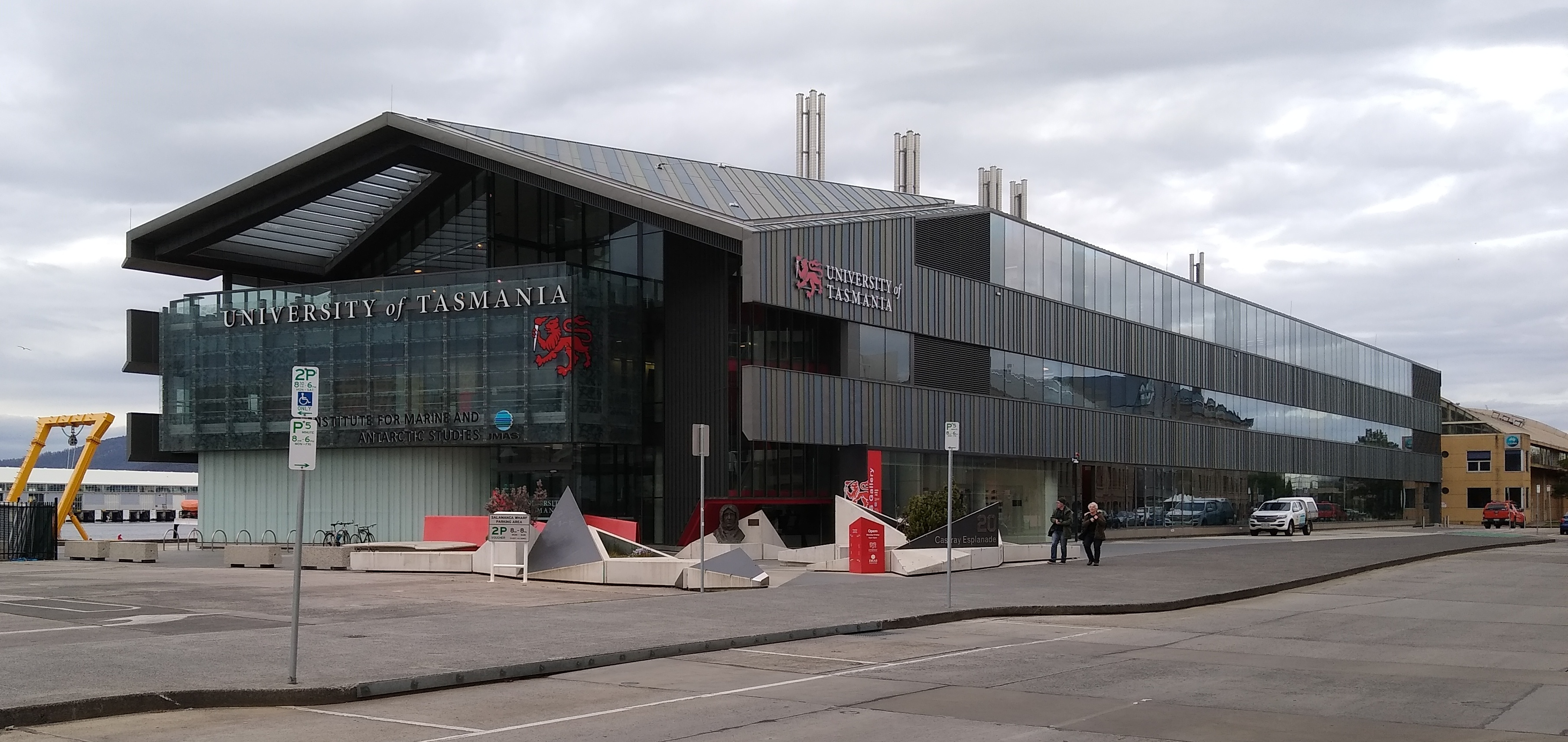
IMAS building on Castray Esplanade, Hobart.

A new 69,000 m^{2} building on the Hobart waterfront was completed in 2013, to co-locate IMAS, Australia's Integrated Marine Observing System (IMOS), the Antarctic Climate and Ecosystems Cooperative Research Centre (ACE CRC), and the Tasmanian Partnership for Advanced Computing (TPAC) staff and students. The building is adjacent to CSIRO Marine Laboratories, and aims to serve as a hub for collaborative marine and Antarctic studies. The project was an initiative of the Australian Government as part of the Education Investment Fund.

Planning is underway for existing research and educational infrastructure totaling ~4,500 m^{2}, south of Hobart at Taroona, to be significantly expanded with new aquaculture and controlled-environment experimental saltwater facilities. Planned new capabilities include temperate/polar ocean simulations and enhanced aquaculture research.

== Partnerships ==
- Australian Antarctic Division
- Antarctic Climate and Ecosystems Co-operative Research Centre (to be co-located with IMAS)
- CSIRO Marine and Atmospheric Research
- Integrated Marine Observing System (to be co-located with IMAS)
- Tasmanian Partnership in Advanced Computing (to be co-located with IMAS)
- National Centre for Marine Conservation and Resource Sustainability at the AMC (NCMCRS),
- Faculty of Science, Engineering, and Technology, University of Tasmania
- Network of Aquaculture Centres in Asia-Pacific
