= Iron Pot Lighthouse =

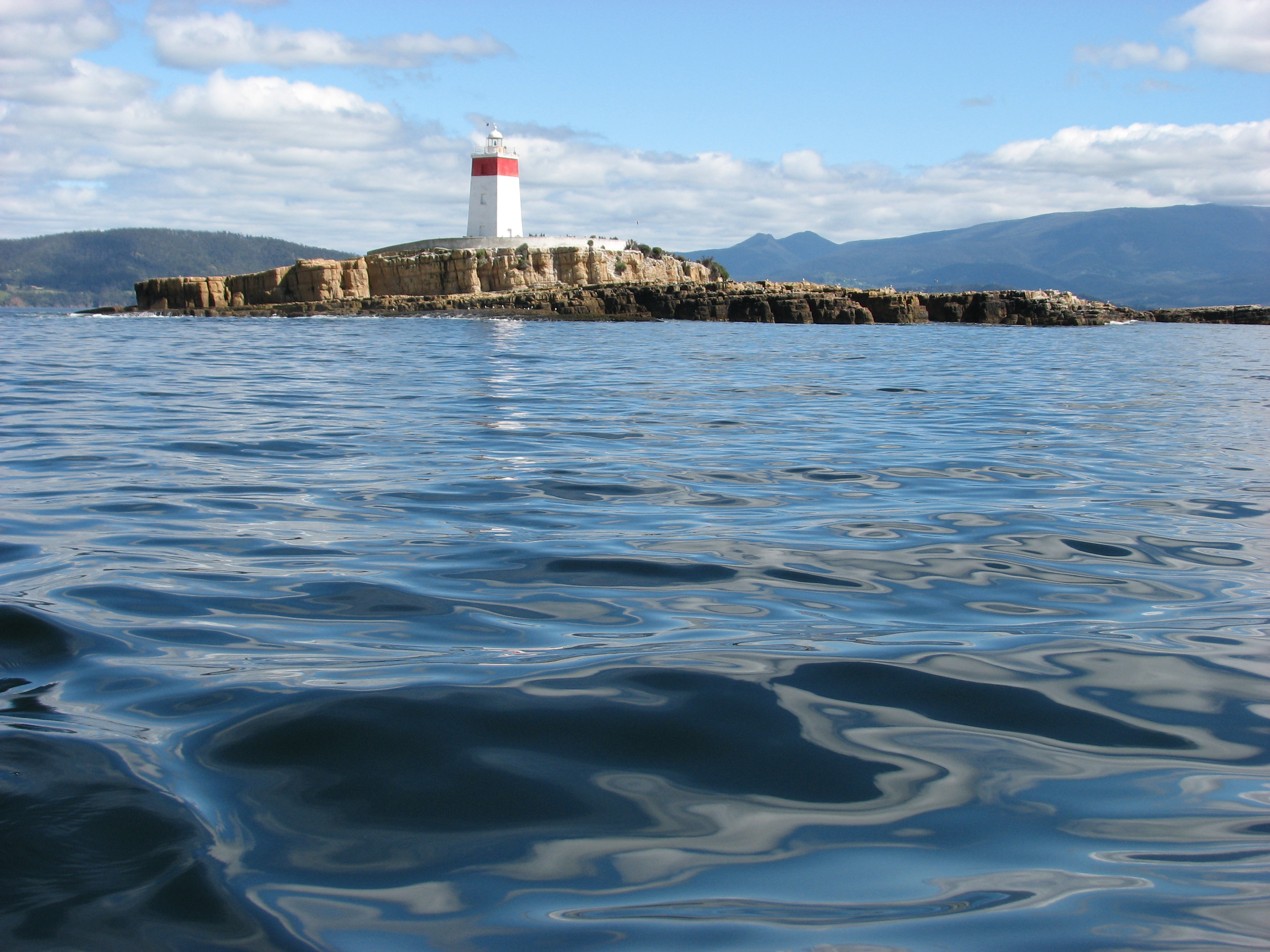
- Location: Storm Bay, Tasmania, Australia
- Coordinates: 43°03′31.4″S 147°25′01.9″E

Tower
- Constructed: 1832
- Construction: rubble masonry tower
- Automated: 1920
- Height: 11 metres (36 ft)
- Shape: square tower with balcony and lantern
- Markings: white tower with a red horizontal band on the top
- Power source: solar power
- Operator: TasPorts
- Heritage: listed on the Tasmanian Heritage Register

Light
- Focal height: 20 metres (66 ft)
- Intensity: 1,780 cd
- Range: 11 nautical miles (20 km; 13 mi)
- Characteristic: Fl (3) W 10s.

The Iron Pot Lighthouse (also known as the Derwent Lighthouse) is a lighthouse located on Iron Pot island in Storm Bay, at the mouth of the River Derwent in Hobart, Tasmania, Australia. Constructed in 1832 with convict labour, Iron Pot Lighthouse is the oldest lighthouse in Tasmania and the oldest original tower in Australia. It was the first lighthouse in Australia to utilise locally manufactured optics, and became the first Australian lighthouse to use solar power in 1977. The 11-metre (36 ft) tall tower has a range of 11 nautical miles (20 km; 13 mi).

== History ==
During his circumnavigation of Van Diemen's Land in 1798, Matthew Flinders observed that the rocks in Storm Bay produced magnetic pulses that disorientated compasses. In the years following the founding of Hobart, early merchants and locals advocated for the construction of a light after a number of significant shipwrecks and groundings, including those of the Bombay (1830), SS Lintrose (1832), and the Princess Royal (1832), which had 300 free women settlers on board. Governor Arthur urged the Hobart Port Control in 1830 that a lighthouse be built in response to the 1827 sinking of the colonial commercial ship Hope. Constructed on a firm rock foundation, the square-based, obelisk sandstone lighthouse was erected in 1832. Quarried from the island with convict labour, the lighthouse walls consist of sandstone blocks 1.5 metres (4 ft 11 in) thick. Raised and lowered by hand, the original lighting apparatus was operated by a lighthouse keeper who lived in a tent with two convict aides. Although ship owners complained that the light source was insufficient, it was not upgraded until 1851.

=== Parkinson family home ===
The construction of a two-storey house for lighthouse keeper James Parkinson and his family in 1884 significantly improved the island's living conditions. The home featured leadlight windows, a cast-iron laced veranda, and the bottom floor functioned as a classroom for Parkinson's seven children. Essie (or Elsie) Margaret Roberts, a child born to the headkeeper's wife in 1895, was the first and only person to be born on the island. The house was demolished in 1921 when the lighthouse became automated and the Marine Board failed to find a tenant.

== Light source ==
The Iron Pot Lighthouse has seen several innovations in its light source technology over the years. Originally, the lighthouse used a simple oil burner, which required a lighthouse keeper to manually operate and maintain it. This system involved filling the lamp with oil and adjusting the wick to ensure a consistent flame. The light emitted from the oil burner was relatively dim and insufficient for the needs of larger ships navigating through Storm Bay. Complaints from shipowners about the weak light led to an upgrade in 1851.

In 1904, an incandescent petroleum vapour burner was introduced. This system represented a major technological advancement for the time, as it used vaporised kerosene as a fuel source. The kerosene was pressurised, causing it to vaporise when heated, resulting in a bright, consistent flame. The vapour was then forced through a fine mesh mantle, which would glow brightly when heated, significantly increasing the intensity of the light. This was the first instance in Australia where this type of lamp was used in a lighthouse, providing a much stronger and more reliable light source than the earlier oil lamps.

By the late 20th century, the focus shifted to more cost-effective and sustainable energy solutions. In 1977, the Iron Pot Lighthouse became the first lighthouse in Australia to be converted to solar power. Solar panels were installed to charge a battery bank during the day, which would then power the light at night. This conversion drastically reduced the need for maintenance, as the solar-powered system was automated and required less manual intervention compared to the kerosene burners. The light source was also changed to an electrically powered bulb, further increasing the efficiency and range of the light. The solar system allowed the lighthouse to operate autonomously, marking the end of the need for an on-site lighthouse keeper.

These technological advancements reflect the evolving needs and capabilities of maritime navigation in Tasmania, transforming Iron Pot Lighthouse from a manually operated, oil-fuelled beacon into a fully automated solar-powered facility.

== Access ==
Located 17.5 kilometres (10.9 mi) south east of Hobart, Iron Pot island is located at the mouth of the Derwent estuary, situated 2 kilometres (1.2 mi) offshore from Cape Direction on the South Arm Peninsula. The island is regularly circumnavigated by tourism operator Pennicott Wilderness Journeys, departing from Constitution Dock at Sullivans Cove, Hobart. The lighthouse itself is automated and closed to the public.

== Gallery ==
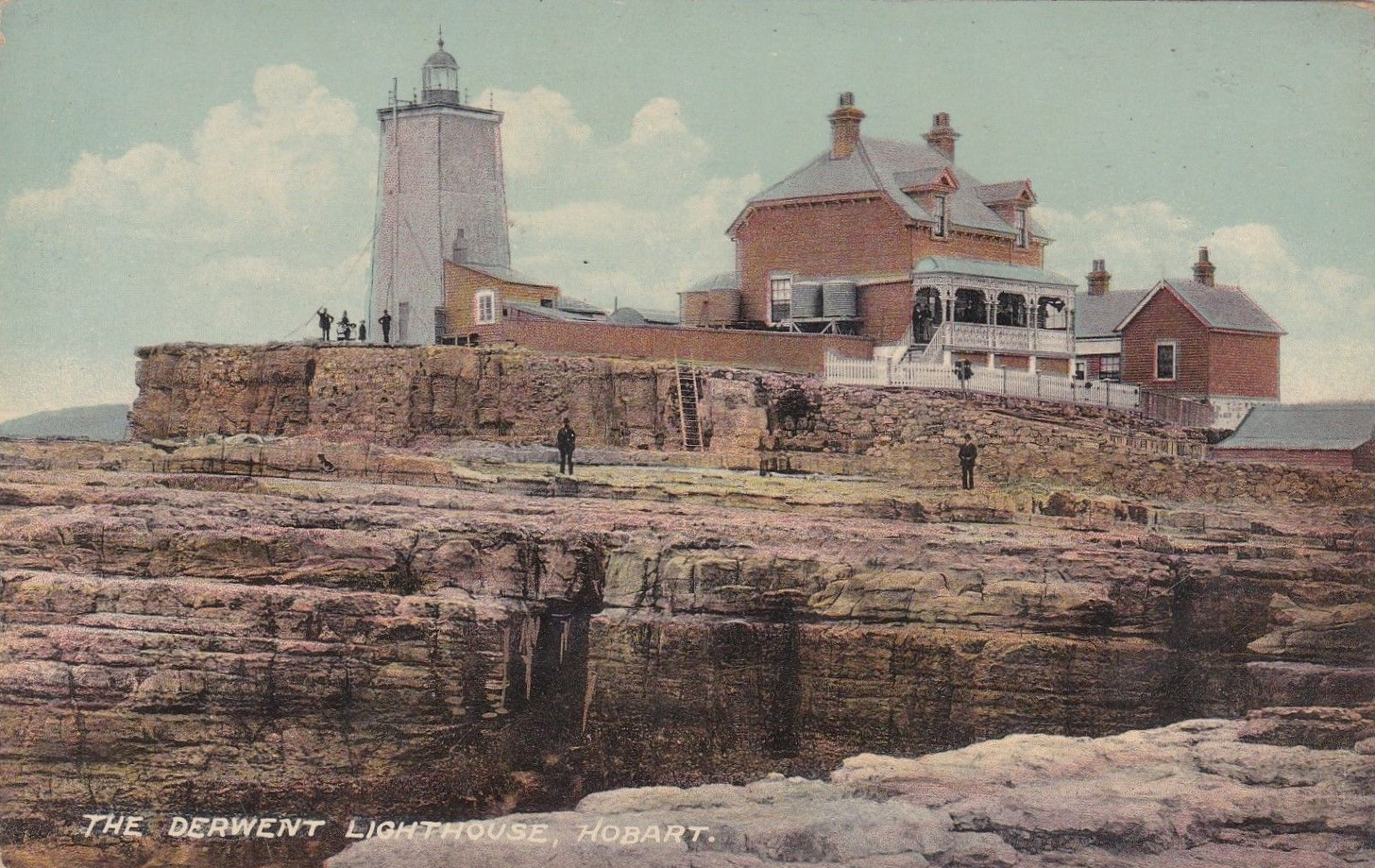
Iron Pot lighthouse with the Parkinson family home c. 1910

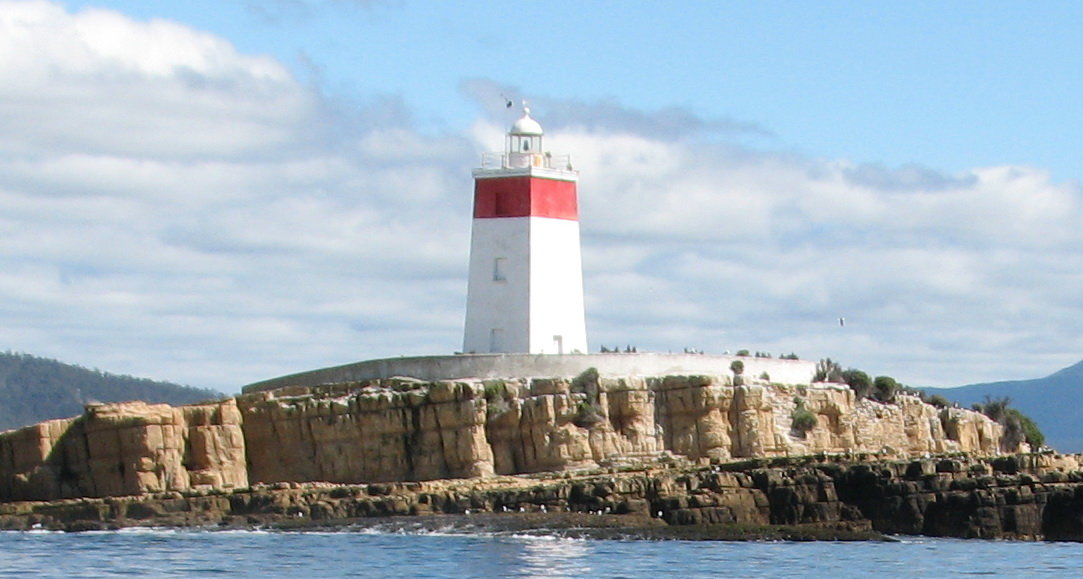
Iron Pot lighthouse c. 2009

== See also ==
- History of Tasmania
- List of lighthouses in Tasmania
