= Ferries in Hobart =

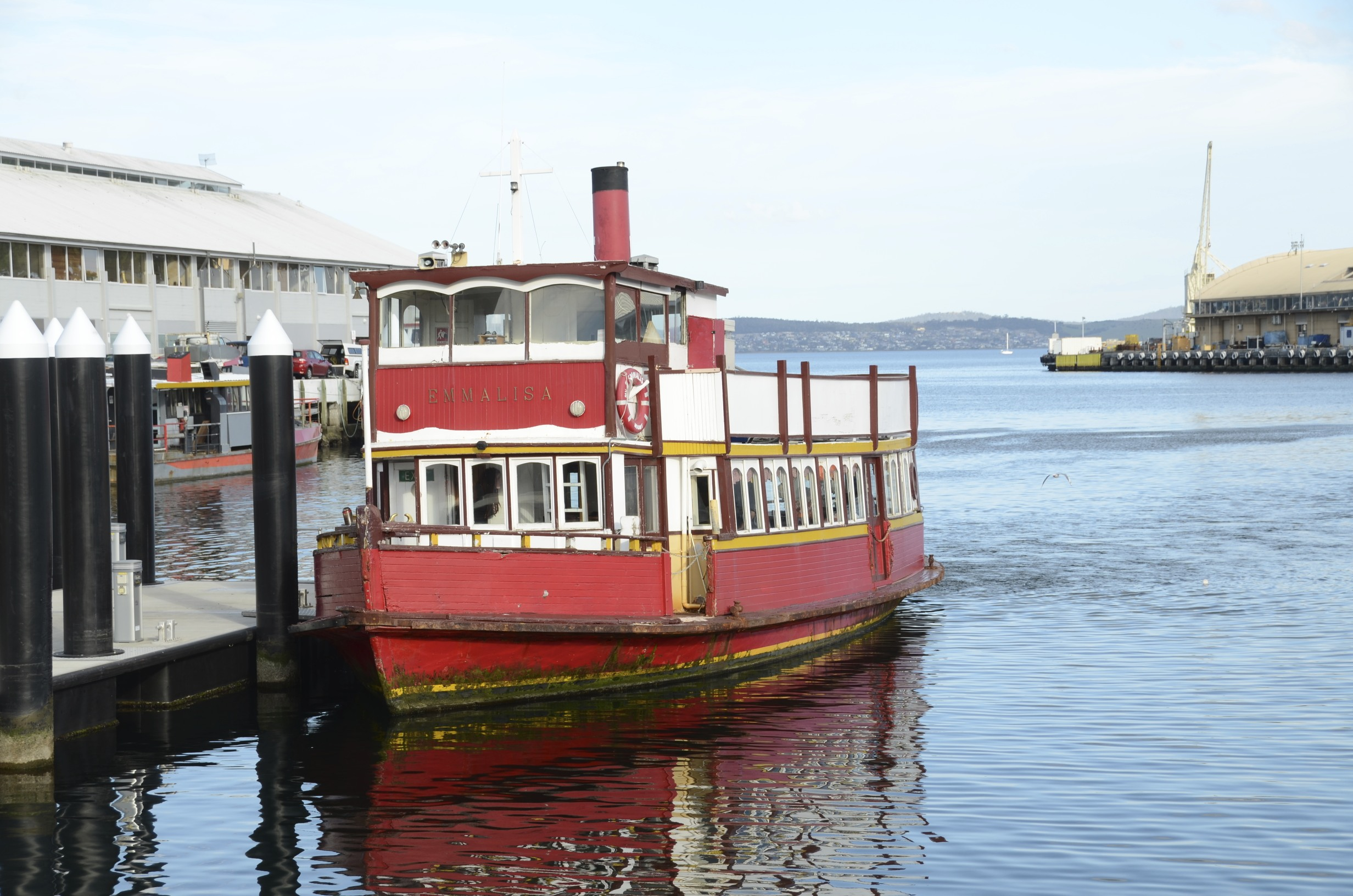
A historic ferry in the port, MV Emmalisa

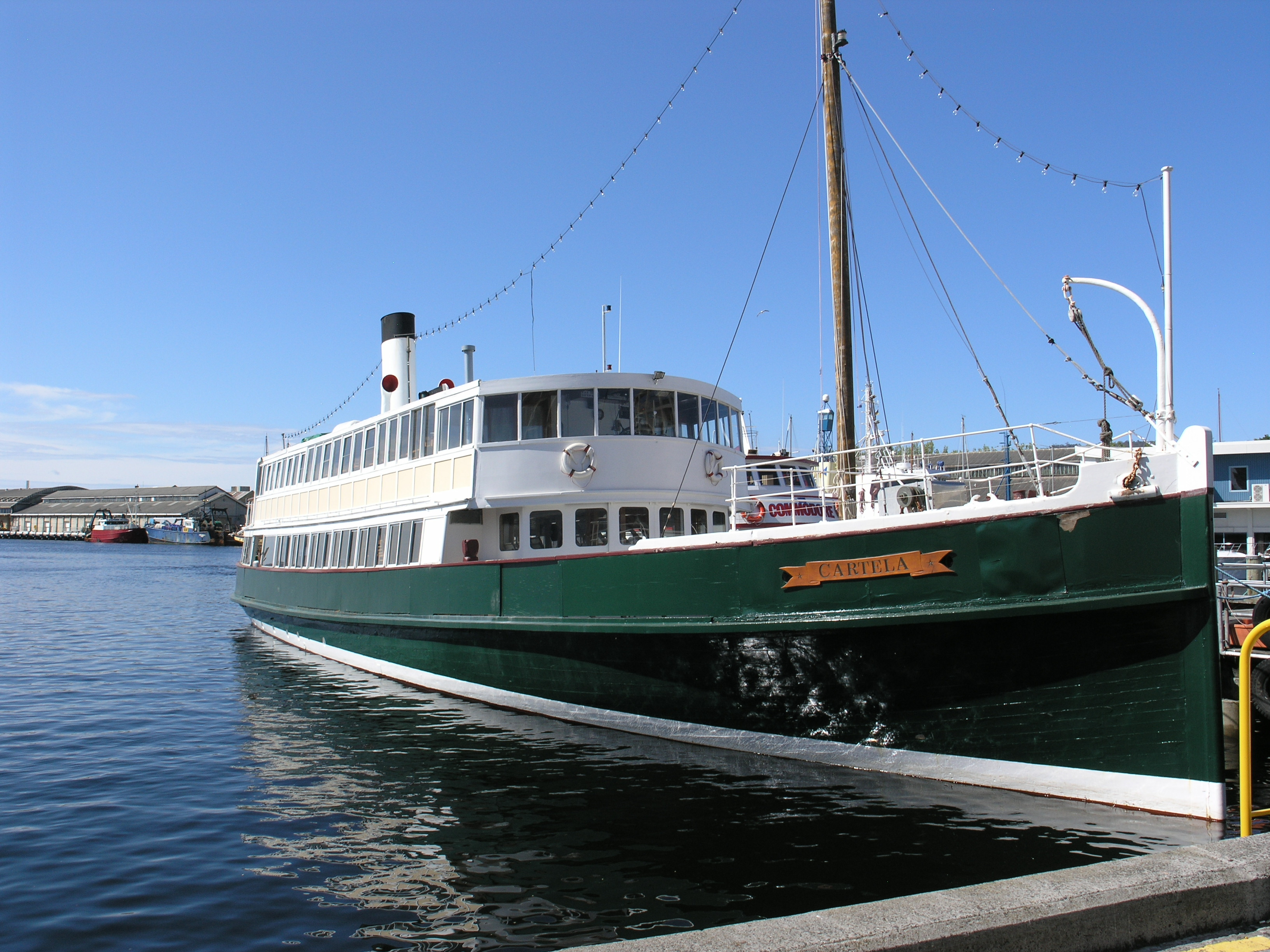
The Cartela was built in Hobart in 1912

Ferries in Hobart are a form of public transport in the city of Hobart, Tasmania. Though for decades they had not provided a major alternative public transport service for commuters and tourists in Hobart across the River Derwent, a renewed ferry service began in 2021. This has resulted in a revival of ferry transport in Hobart, including long-term plans to expand the network.

== History ==
Since the earliest times of settlement in Hobart, river transport has been used to allow people to move around the city. Prior to the construction of the Hobart Bridge, and its replacement the Tasman Bridge, ferry services were far more important, and previously called at more locations. Following the reconstruction of a public jetty at Opossum Bay in December 2006, calls were made for a more organised and regular commuter ferry service.

A vehicle ferry operated between the Hobart central business district and Bellerive until the Hobart Bridge opened in 1943. Passenger ferries continued until replaced by Metropolitan Transport Trust buses 1963.

In August 1978, P O'May commenced operating a Hobart to Bellerive service with two vessels. It ceased in August 1980. It recommenced in September 1981, ceasing again in November 2002.

Hobart has also had a long shipbuilding industry, which continues through Incat and Richardson Devine Marine who manufacture catamaran ferries.

=== Tasman Bridge disaster ===
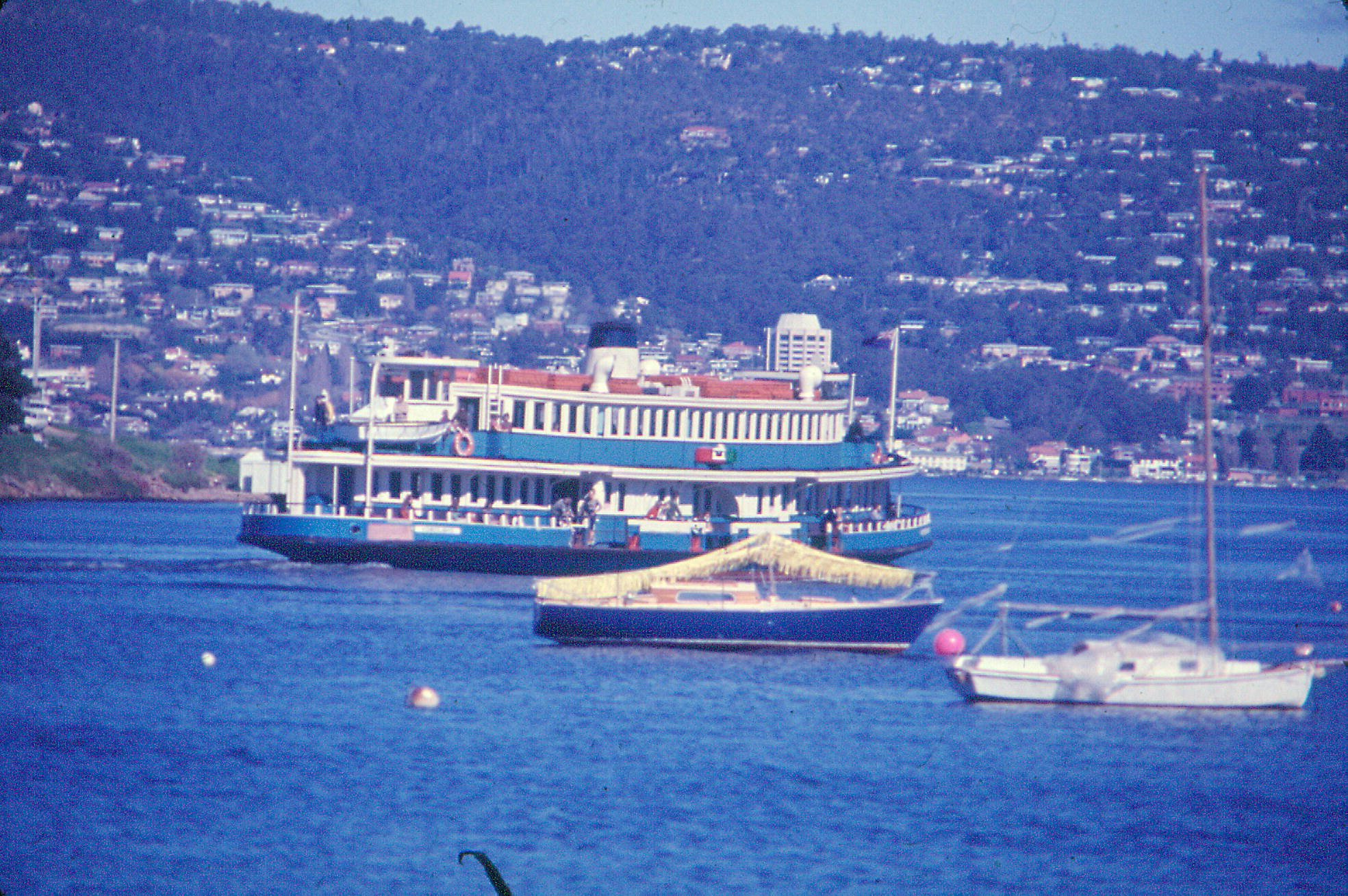
Sydney ferry Kosciusko in Hobart following the 1975 collapse of the Tasman Bridge

Following the Tasman Bridge disaster in 1975, services across the River Derwent were operated by Sullivans Cove Ferry Services (owner Bob Clifford - vessels Mathew Brady and James McCabe) and Roche Brothers (Cartela) while the Public Transport Commission loaned the Sydney ferries Kosciusko and Lady Wakehurst.

Later ferries Included Sullivans Cove Ferry Services (Martin Cash) and Wakatere (hovercraft). The Tasmanian government purchased the passenger and vehicular ferry Man On from Hong Kong. It was converted to a passenger only vessel with a capacity of 900 and renamed Harry O'May.

== Public transport operations ==
=== Trial service ===
In May 2018, it was announced that the State Government would introduce legislation to allow Metro Tasmania to introduce a service from Bellerive to Sullivans Cove. However in March 2021 the Roche Brothers who also run the Maria Island ferry service, the Port Arthur Historic Site ferry and MONA ferries were selected as the preferred proponent of a trial service between Bellerive and Brooke Street Pier in Sullivans Cove. Derwent Ferries a subsidiary of the Roche Brothers' Navigator Group was later selected as the operator.

Commencing 9 August 2021, the first year of the River Derwent ferry trial provided 15 crossings of the River Derwent each weekday (excluding public holidays) operated by Derwent Ferries between the City and Bellerive. Travel was free for Greencard holders and those travelling with a bicycle or e-scooter until the 8 August 2022 when fares were introduced for these passengers for the second year of the trial.

=== Current service ===
Derwent Ferries runs services on the single F2 route across the River Derwent out of Hobart between Bellerive Pier (Victoria Esplanade) and Brooke Street Pier (Franklin Wharf), with the Excella as the sole ferry within the fleet.

A one-way trip takes approximately 15 minutes, with the ferry starting the weekday at Bellerive and departing eight times there from 6:20 am as the first time and 5:30 pm as the last (40-minute intervals), before returning from the CBD at 5:50 pm to Bellerive. The service has capacity for 535 city bound and 321 Bellerive bound passengers per day. The ferry is fitted with an accessible toilet and can hold 107 passengers as well as 15 bicycle spots. Starting on the 29 October 2022 services were extended to Saturday (14 crossings between 9:00 am and 4:00 pm) and 130,000 passengers were reported to have taken the ferry by this date.

A 20% discount on fares is provided for Greencard users, with free transfers from Metro Tasmania bus services within 90 minutes (located at Victoria Road and Elizabeth Street) and without traversing additional Zones. Cash and EFTPOS are also accepted.

F2 single trip fares as of 1 July 2024
	Cash	Greencard
Full fare adult	$1.70	$1.36
Adult concession	$1.20	$0.96
Child/student (5–16yrs)	$1.00	$0.80

=== Future services ===
In 2022 three new locations were planned in Sandy Bay, Lindisfarne and Wilkinsons Point after the Albanese government provided an additional $20 million for the new terminals, matching the state government. The masterplan released in November 2023 planned for six new locations in Regatta Point, Sandy Bay, Wilkinsons Point, Howrah Point, Lindisfarne and Kingston Beach. In June 2024, Greater Hobart councils initiated testing for the initial three new terminal sites, employing Burbury Consulting.

== Other ferry services in Southern Tasmania ==
There are a number of other operators that run ferries out of Hobart which include Hobart Historic Cruises (Spirit of Hobart), MONA ferries Ena (MONA Roma 1) and Freya (MONA Roma 2), Navigators (Peppermint Bay II and Peppermint Bay 1 or MR0) and Pennicott Wilderness Journeys. The majority of these services are for tourism related purposes.

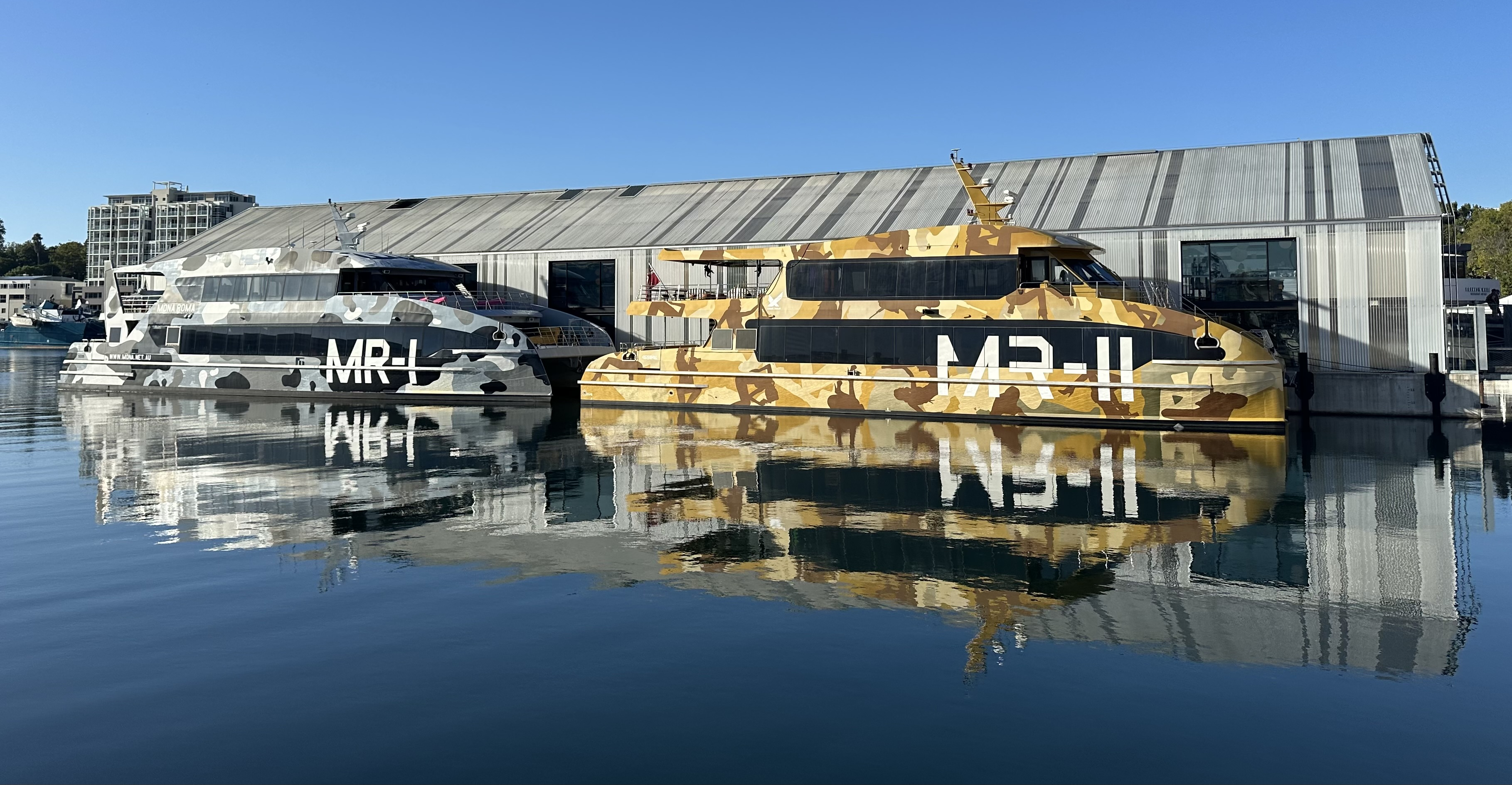
Ena (MR-1) and Freya (MR-2) ferries by Incat at Brooke Street Pier. Commuter ferries operate on the other side, including former MR-0 MV Excella

Short services include Derwent Harbour cruise, Moorilla Estate, Iron Pot, Bruny Island and Storm Bay. Longer ferry services take passengers to visit the D'Entrecasteaux Channel and stop at Woodbridge and Kettering. Jet Boat services also operate out of Hobart, New Norfolk and Huonville.

Ferry Services operate out of

- Triabunna to Maria Island,
- Kettering to Bruny Island (Mirambeena, Bowen, Moongalba),
- Adventure Bay
- Port Arthur for the Three Capes Walk (The Blade),
- Port Arthur harbour cruise including small islands (MV Marana), and
- Port Arthur to Eaglehawk Neck
