= Bellerive Oval =

Sports venue in Bellerive, Tasmania

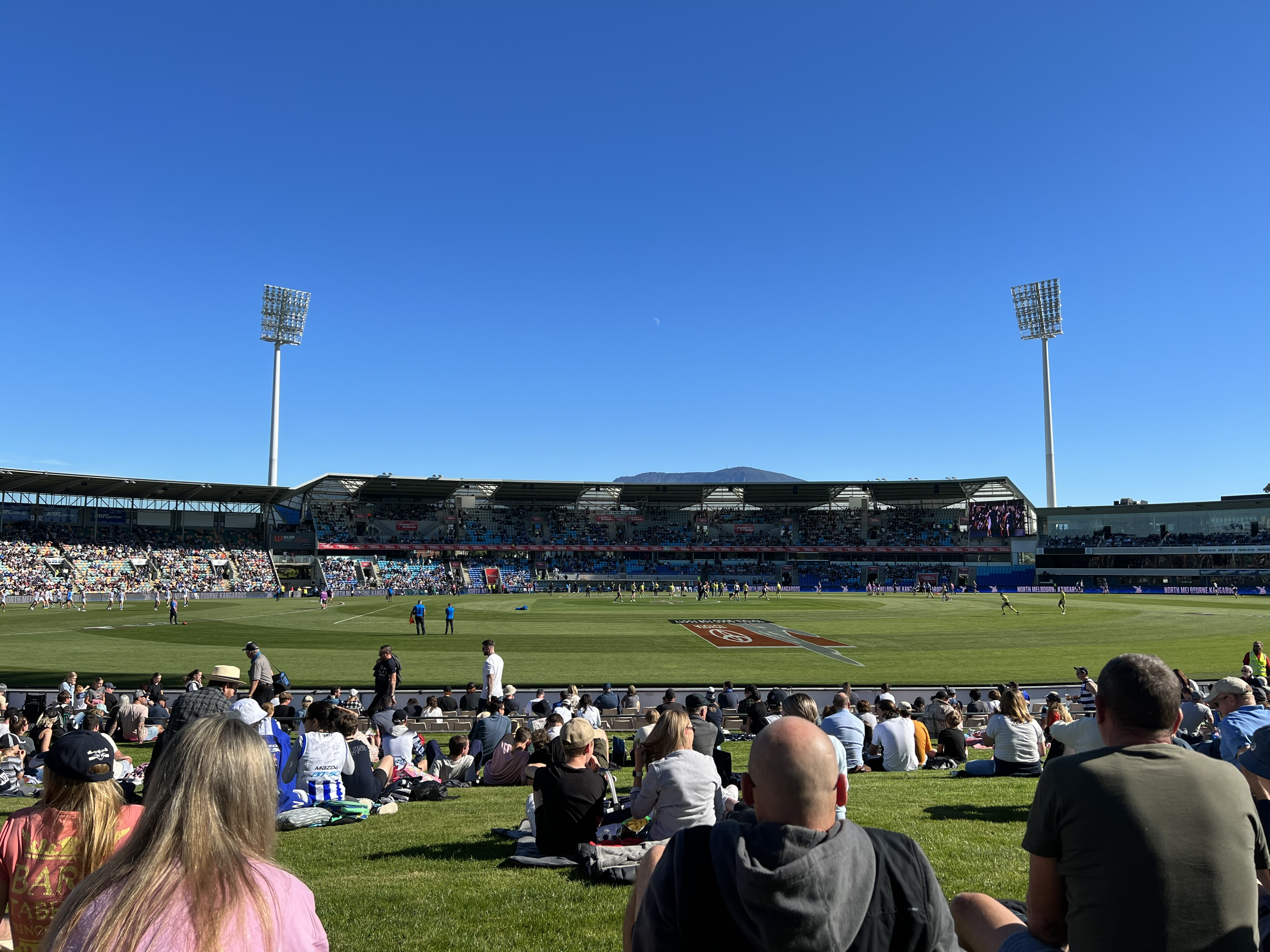
- North Melbourne vs Geelong AFL match, 2022
- Interactive map of Bellerive Oval
- Former names: Blundstone Arena (2011-2024)
- Address: 15 Derwent Street
- Location: Bellerive, Tasmania
- Coordinates: 42°52′38″S 147°22′25″E
- Owner: Cricket Tasmania
- Operator: Cricket Tasmania
- Capacity: 19,500
- Surface: Grass
- Field size: 160 m × 124 m (525 ft × 407 ft)
- Public transit: Buses Ferries

Construction
- Groundbreaking: 1913
- Opened: 1914
- Cost: Unknown
- Architect: Various

Tenants
- Australia national cricket team (International Cricket) (1989-present); Tasmanian Tigers (Sheffield Shield/One-Day Cup) (1977-present); Clarence Football Club (TSL/SFL) (1914-present); Hobart Hurricanes (BBL) (2011-present); Hobart Hurricanes (WBBL) (2015-present); North Melbourne Football Club (AFL) (2012-2025); Tasmania Football Club (AFL AFLW VFL & VFLW) (2026-present); North Melbourne Tasmanian Kangaroos (AFLW) (2022-2024; Tasmanian Devils (VFL) (2003-2008); Tassie Mariners (TAC Cup) (2007-2016); Tasmania Devils Academy (Talent League) (2019-present); St Kilda Football Club (AFL) (2021); Richmond Football Club (AFL) (2026-present); South Hobart FC (Australia Cup) (2019); 2015 Cricket World Cup; 2022 Men's T20 World Cup

Website
- www.belleriveoval.com.au
- Blundstone Arena

Ground information
- Country: Australia
- End names
- Church Street End; River End

International information
- First men's Test: 16–20 December 1989: Australia v Sri Lanka
- Last men's Test: 14–16 January 2022: Australia v England
- First men's ODI: 12 January 1988: New Zealand v Sri Lanka
- Last men's ODI: 11 November 2018: Australia v South Africa
- First men's T20I: 21 February 2010: Australia v Pakistan
- Last men's T20I: 2 November 2025: Australia v India
- First women's ODI: 17 January 1991: Australia v New Zealand
- Last women's ODI: 17 January 2025: Australia v England
- First women's T20I: 21 February 2010: Australia v New Zealand
- Last women's T20I: 30 January 2024: Australia v South Africa
- As of 2 November 2025; Source: Cricinfo

Bellerive Oval (known under naming rights as Ninja Stadium) is a stadium located in the Hobart suburb of Bellerive. It is primarily used for cricket as the home ground of the Hobart Hurricanes in the Big Bash League (BBL), and the Tasmania cricket team in the Sheffield Shield. It also frequently hosts Australian rules football, with multiple clubs having hosted at the ground, most recently the Richmond Football Club in the Australian Football League (AFL). It is also set to be the primary home ground of the Tasmania Football Club when they join the AFL in 2028 until the opening of Macquarie Point Stadium.

With a combination of seating and standing capacity of 19,500, it is the largest stadium in Tasmania. It has hosted international Test matches since 1989 and One-Day Internationals (ODIs) since 1988. Kitchen and cookwear company SharkNinja have owned naming rights to the stadium since 2024.

== History ==
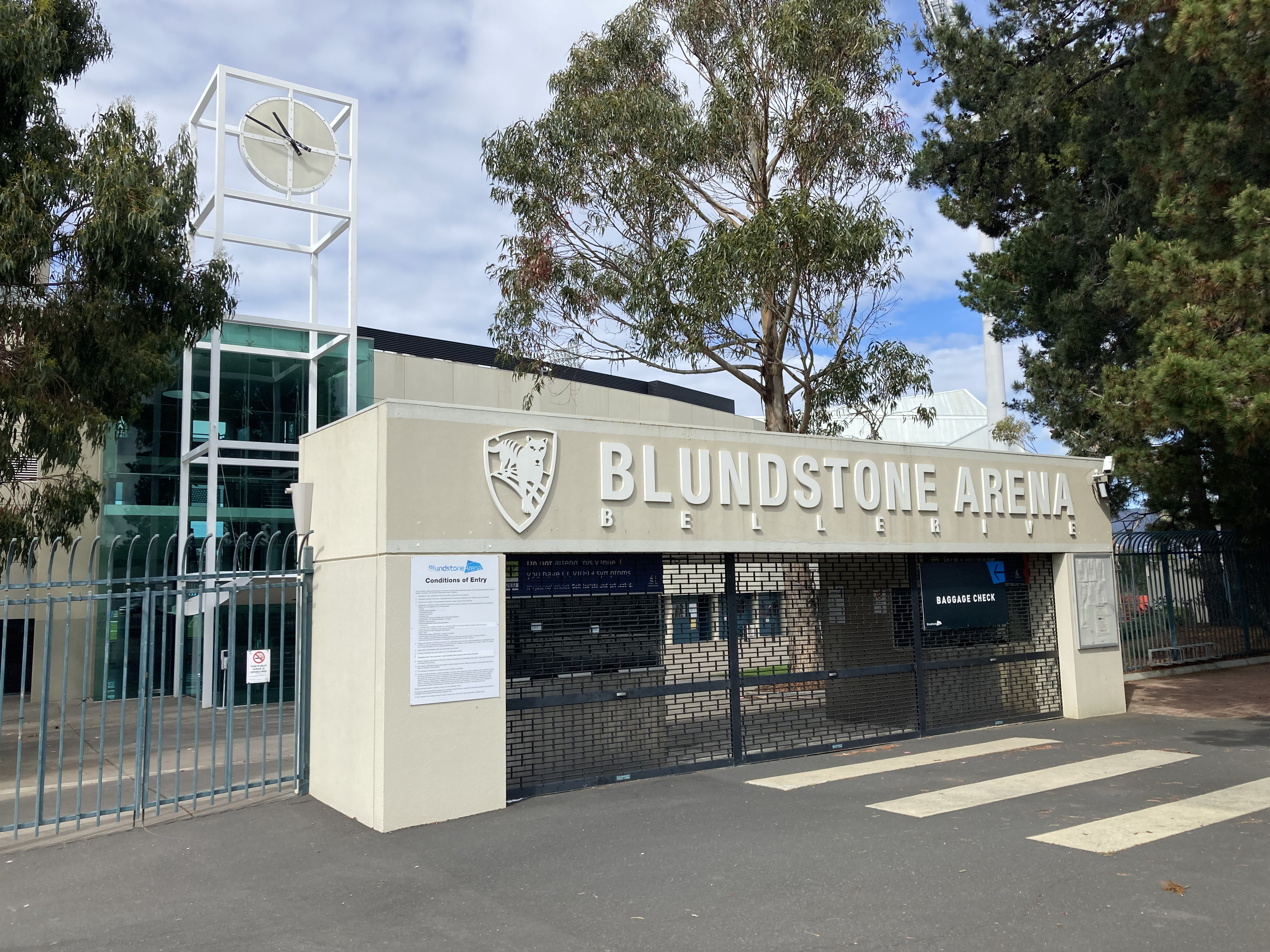
Front gate in 2022

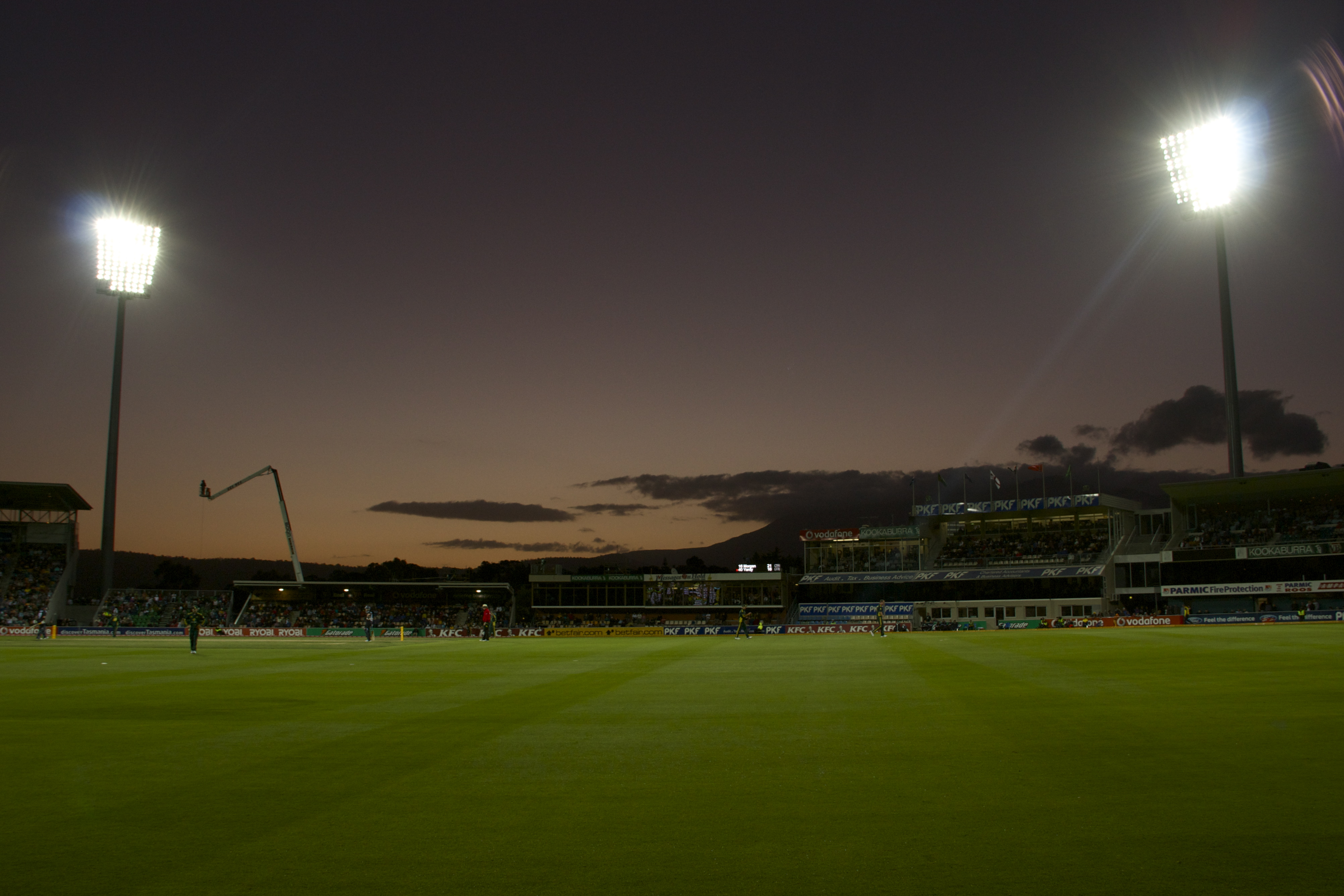
Bellerive Oval with lights on in 2011

Football and cricket first started being played in the area where Bellerive Oval is now in the mid-to-late 19th century. In 1884, the first football match on record from the area was played between Carlton and Bellerive. In 1913, the piece of land located between Bellerive Beach and Church and Derwent streets was sold to the Clarence Council. One year later, the new Bellerive recreation ground was ready for use.

The ground was largely unchanged until the mid-1980s. During this time, there was a hump in the centre of the ground, making only the top halves of players visible from the other side of the ground. There was a shed for players, located where the main pavilion now stands. There was a hill on the outer (where the hill now is) that could accommodate two rows of vehicles; the small scoreboard stood on the outer, close to where the electronic scoreboard is now, and the time clock sat about halfway up a training light tower. Until very recently, the police booth sat in the north-east corner of the oval. A concrete cricket pitch served local junior teams until the 1956/57 season, when it was replaced by a turf wicket.

In 1948, when the Clarence Football Club – a tenant of the ground – applied to join the Tasmanian Football League, the ground had to upgrade to TFL standards.

Some minor upgrades were made in the 1960s: clubrooms were built in 1961 and in 1963, a small grandstand (seating about 500) and new public address system were installed.

In 1977, Tasmania gained admission into the Sheffield Shield and the TCA planned to move to a new oval, away from its headquarters at the TCA Ground on the Domain. Bellerive Oval was chosen ahead of KGV Oval and North Hobart Oval. $2.2 million was spent building new grandstands, training nets, a hill, new surface and centre wicket. The old TCA Ground scoreboard was relocated there and the centrepiece three-level members' pavilion was constructed.

The newly refurbished ground was opened in 1986 for a TFL Statewide League roster match between Clarence and Hobart, which Clarence won in front of a crowd of 3,562. Significant damage to the newly laid turf resulted in no more football matches being scheduled for that season.

The move was made in 1987 under TCA Chairman Denis Rogers, in time for the ground's first international match—between Sri Lanka and New Zealand—on 12 January 1988, before a crowd of 6,500.

The first Test match in Tasmania was played at Bellerive from 16 to 20 December 1989, between Australia and Sri Lanka. Shortly afterwards, the new electronic scoreboard and Northern Stand were erected.

In 2007, the venue saw the Tasmanian Tigers win the state's first Sheffield Shield and in 2008, the ground hosted its first One-Day Cup final, also won by Tasmania.

The oval became the first top-class cricket facility in Australia to sign a naming-rights sponsor in October 2011. A naming rights agreement with Blundstone Footwear resulted in the oval being renamed Blundstone Arena, which was temporarily discontinued during the ground's use in the 2015 Cricket World Cup.

In 2023, Bellerive Oval saw further updates, which were particularly focused on improving accessibility and sustainability. The oval adopted several eco-friendly initiatives, including solar panels on the roofs of both the Ricky Ponting Stand and David Boon Stand, reducing its carbon footprint by 20%. These sustainability efforts were part of a broader push by Cricket Tasmania to modernise its venues and reduce environmental impact during large-scale events.

In October 2024, SharkNinja commenced a four-year naming rights deal, with the venue being renamed Ninja Stadium.

The most runs scored here in Test format is by Ricky Ponting (581 runs), followed by Michael Hussey (507 runs) and Mark Taylor (405 runs). The most wickets taken here is by Shane Warne (28 wickets), followed by Peter Siddle (22 wickets) and Glenn McGrath (19 wickets).

The most runs scored here in ODI format is by Kumar Sangakkara (346 runs), followed by Shaun Marsh (339 runs) and Tillakaratne Dilshan (324 runs). The most wickets taken here is by Wasim Akram (11 wickets).

== Capacity ==
Following the completion of the 6,000 seat Ricky Ponting Stand in 2015, the stadium's capacity officially reached 20,000.

== Women's sport expansion ==
Bellerive Oval has played an increasing role in women's cricket and AFL, hosting several prominent matches for both the Women's Big Bash League (WBBL) and AFLW. In 2023, the oval hosted the WBBL final, attracting 14,500 spectators, the highest ever attendance for a women's match at the venue. The growth of women's sport in Tasmania has been highlighted by this venue's importance, particularly with investments into better training facilities for female athletes, such as a dedicated gym and locker room area built in 2022.

== Controversies ==
Despite its continued development, Bellerive Oval has not been without controversy. Local residents have increasingly voiced concerns about the impact of larger crowds on the surrounding areas. Parking and traffic remain contentious issues, with local government proposals in 2024 to develop additional parking structures being met with opposition from environmental groups, who argue the new developments will encroach on parkland areas.

== Structures and facilities ==
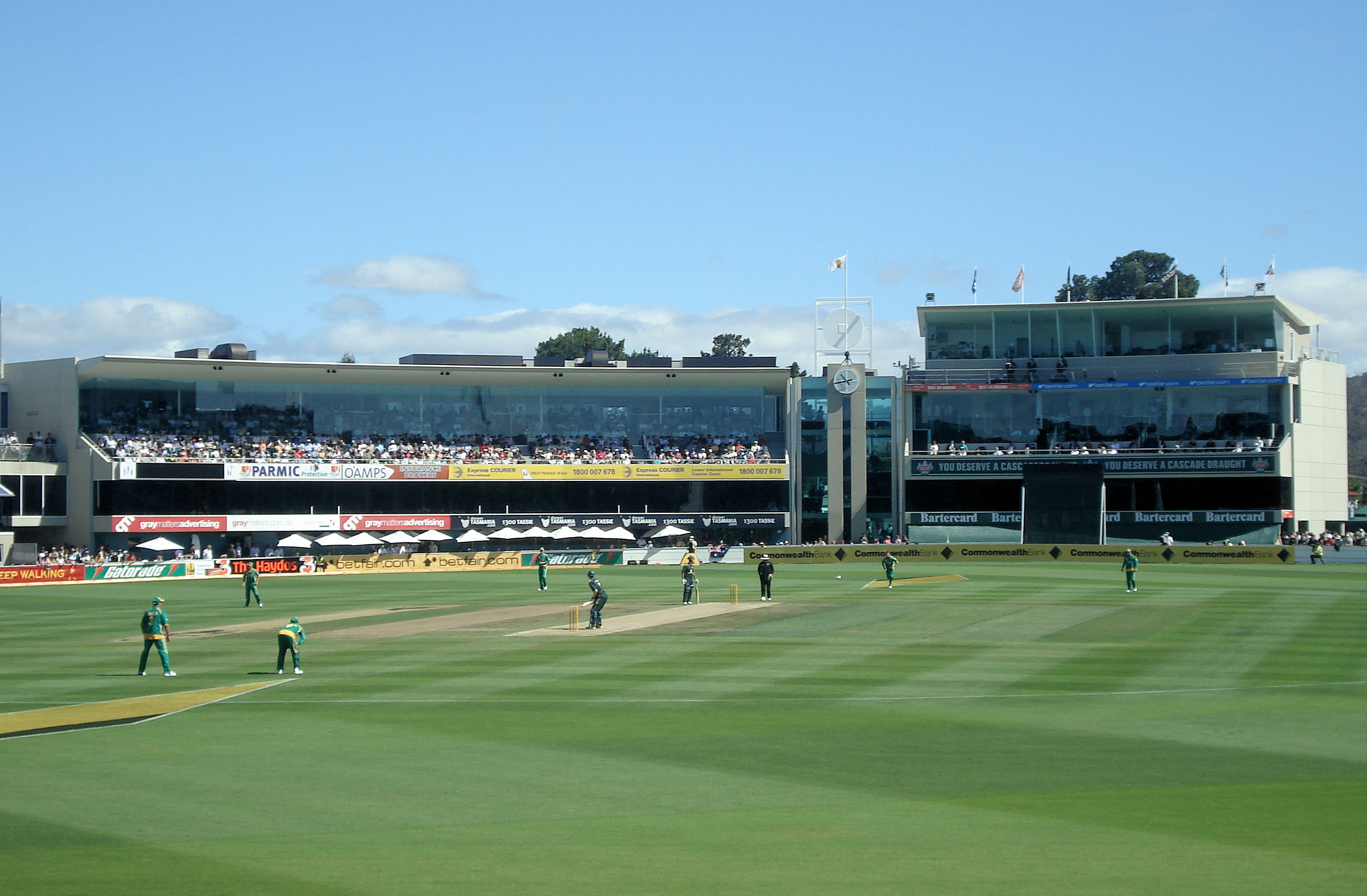
Members' Stand in 2009

In 1999, the Federal Government announced that it would contribute $5 million to upgrade Bellerive. The TCA added $10 million, on loan from the state government, and the Clarence City Council $1 million, enabling a $16 million upgrade. The first part of this upgrade was the state-of-the-art indoor nets. The 6,000-seat Southern Stand came next, which blocked winds and views of the Derwent, and contained the new media centre. The new Members' Area was the last of the upgrades, along with new perimeter fence and entry gates. The Members' Area features press and radio media areas, corporate boxes and lunchrooms, as well as the players areas, members' bars and TCA offices. The redevelopment was officially opened on 11 January 2003, when an overcrowd of 16,719 (official capacity 16,000) witnessed a thrilling one-day match between Australia and England, the victory going to Australia.

To allow for day-night matches to be played at the venue, four light towers were installed in 2009 for $4.8 million, enabling one-day international (ODI) and Twenty20 cricket matches to be played there. The installation of these lights sparked significant debate from groups both for and against the new towers.

The ground was scheduled for further redevelopment by 2015, with the state government providing $15 million to expand the Southern Stand and Members' Stand, increasing the ground's capacity to 19,500 for the 2015 Cricket World Cup, along with an Ashes Test in the future, and the possibility of locking-in a long-term commitment for AFL games. AFL Tasmania is also looking at moving its offices to the ground as part of the redevelopment. At the official launch of the renovated stadium, it was announced that the new stand would be named the Ricky Ponting Stand, and the existing Southern Stand would be named the David Boon Stand.

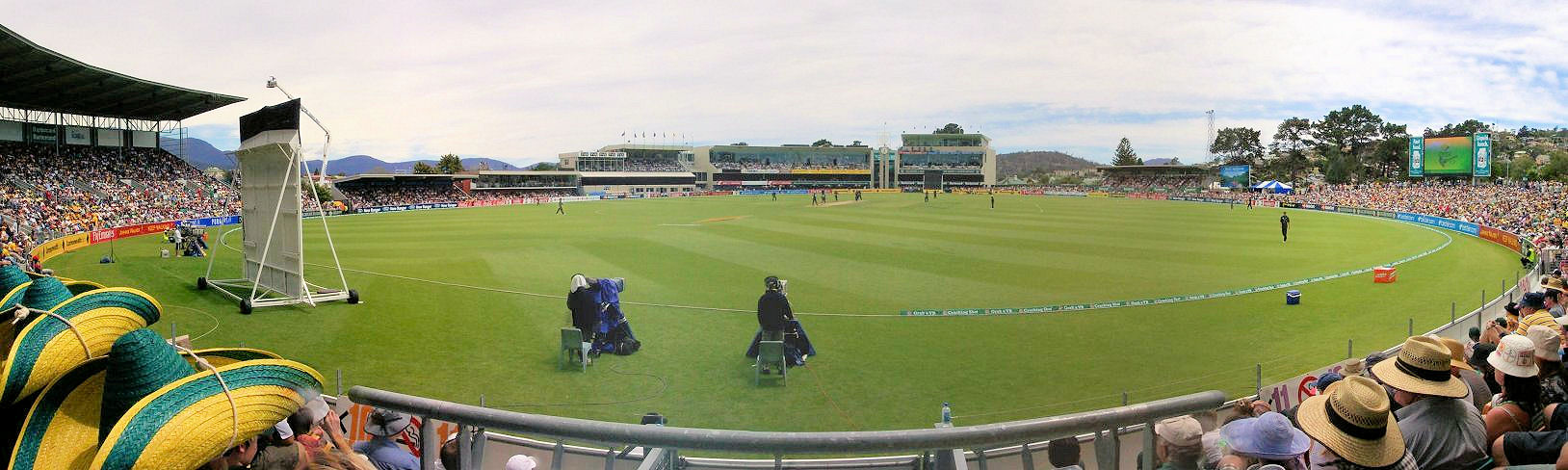
A panorama of Australia v New Zealand Cricket One-day International in 2007

== Events ==
As well as being the home of domestic and international cricket and the Clarence Football Club in the now Tasmanian State League, Bellerive Oval served in 2003 as a home to the Tasmanian Devils in the VFL. The first match attracted the highest VFL roster match crowd since 1986–6,970. The venue also hosted Tasmania's two finals matches, with the elimination win against Geelong (4,800) and 10,073 for a semi-final against Port Melbourne, which was won by Port Melbourne. the venue hosted the BBL 14 Final between the Hobart Hurricanes And the Sydney Thunder with a crowd of 15,706 on the 27 January 2025

== Australian rules football ==
In 2010, talk of Melbourne-based Australian Football League (AFL) clubs shifting home games to Bellerive Oval surfaced. Richmond were considered the early front-runners, but by July 2010 North Melbourne became the most likely candidate, given their willingness to move more than just two matches.

On 7 June 2011, North Melbourne announced a new three-year deal in partnership with transport company Spirit of Tasmania, who announced its intent to sponsor North Melbourne home games in Hobart, at Bellerive Oval. From 2012 to 2014, North Melbourne played two home games per year at the venue. The first game was played 8 April 2012 in Round 2, in which North Melbourne defeated the fledgling Greater Western Sydney Giants by 129 points. The original three-year deal was renewed and extended for a further two years, with Hobart City Council and Spirit of Tasmania agreeing to provide sponsorship for North Melbourne to play three games per year at the venue in 2015 and 2016. A new deal, which did not include the council, was struck in 2016. The arrangement in effect from 2017 to 2021 allowed North Melbourne to continue playing three matches a season at Bellerive Oval, A renegotiated three-year deal effective from 2022 saw North Melbourne play four home games a year. North Melbourne ended the association with the venue in 2025, playing two home games at Bellerive Oval that season and transitioning two home games per season to Perth and Bunbury, Western Australia.

It was announced in November 2025 that Richmond would play one home match at the ground in the 2026 and 2027 seasons, replacing its Marvel Stadium home game. The first match will be against reigning premiers, the Brisbane Lions.

It was announced in December 2025 that the Tasmania Devils who will enter the AFL in 2028 will initially split home games between York Park in Launceston and Bellerive Oval in Hobart, before shifting Hobart-based matches to the proposed Macquarie Point Stadium in 2031.

== Records and attendance ==
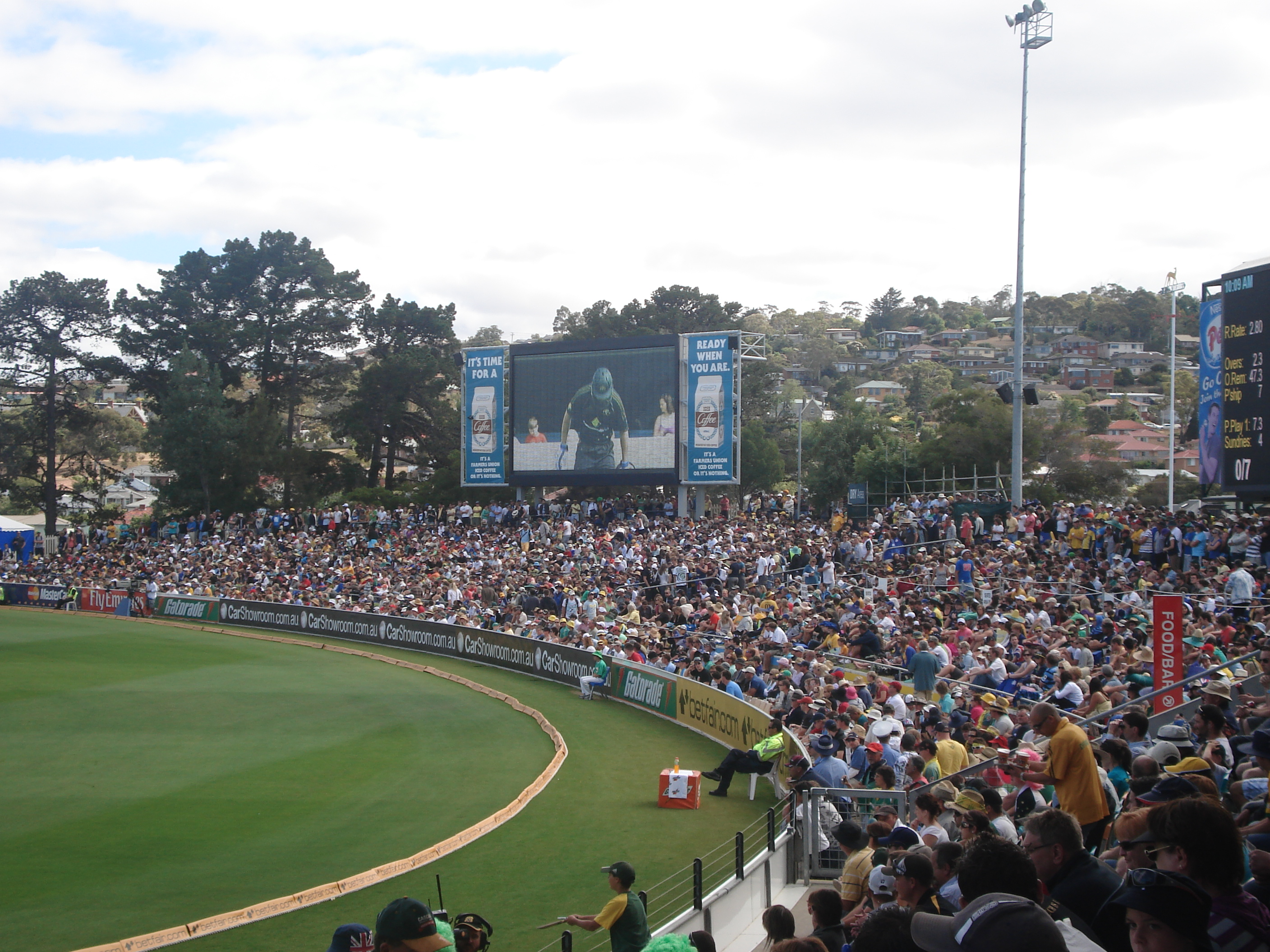
The Western Hill and Ricky Ponting Stand during an international cricket match.

The record crowd for Bellerive Oval stands at 18,149 for a BBL|05 match between the Hobart Hurricanes and Perth Scorchers on 10 January 2016. Following the construction of the Ricky Ponting Stand in 2014, the overall official venue capacity reached 19,500.

=== Notable fixture records ===
| Event / Record | Date | Match | Sport / Competition | Attendance | Ref. |
|---|---|---|---|---|---|
| Venue Record | 10 January 2016 | Hobart Hurricanes v. Perth Scorchers | Cricket (BBL) | 18,149 | |
| AFL Record | 3 June 2016 | North Melbourne v. Richmond | Australian rules football (AFL) | 17,844 | |
| Pre-redevelopment Record | 14 January 2003 | Australia v. England | Cricket (ODI) | 16,719 | |
| First BBL Title Victory | 27 January 2025 | Hobart Hurricanes v. Sydney Thunder | Cricket (BBL|14 Final) | 15,706 | |
| First Day/Night Test (Aggregate) | 14–16 January 2022 | Australia v. England | Cricket (5th Ashes Test) | 25,801 (Note: Daily turnstile attendances: Day 1 (14 Jan): 9,002 (Austadiums); Day 2 (15 Jan): 8,711 (Austadiums); Day 3 (16 Jan): 8,088 (Austadiums).) | |
| First WBBL Title Victory | 13 December 2025 | Hobart Hurricanes v. Perth Scorchers | Cricket (WBBL|11 Final) | 5,251 | |
| First International Match | 12 January 1988 | New Zealand v. Sri Lanka | Cricket (ODI) | 6,180 | |

=== Top 10 attendances ===
| No. | Date | Teams | Sport | Competition | Crowd |
|---|---|---|---|---|---|
| 1 | 10 January 2016 | Hobart Hurricanes v. Perth Scorchers | Cricket | BBL | 18,149 |
| 2 | 26 December 2016 | Hobart Hurricanes v. Melbourne Stars | Cricket | BBL | 18,079 |
| 3 | 8 January 2017 | Hobart Hurricanes v. Sydney Thunder | Cricket | BBL | 17,939 |
| 4 | 3 June 2016 | North Melbourne v. Richmond | Australian rules football | AFL | 17,844 |
| 5 | 9 May 2015 | North Melbourne v. Richmond | Australian rules football | AFL | 17,544 |
| 6 | 21 January 2017 | Hobart Hurricanes v. Perth Scorchers | Cricket | BBL | 17,445 |
| 7 | 1 January 2016 | Hobart Hurricanes v. Sydney Thunder | Cricket | BBL | 17,151 |
| 8 | 2 January 2017 | Hobart Hurricanes v. Adelaide Strikers | Cricket | BBL | 16,815 |
| 9 | 14 January 2003 | Australia v. England | Cricket | ODI | 16,719 |
| 10 | 20 August 2016 | North Melbourne v. Sydney Swans | Australian rules football | AFL | 16,495 |

== Transport ==
Metro bus services are available to and from Bellerive Oval. Development into an international venue has far outgrown the capacity of local infrastructure to adequately handle the large influxes of patrons attempting to access the venue. In particular, there is little provision for spectator parking. Thus, large numbers of vehicles are parked in the surrounding streets when such events are held, resulting in access issues for local residents and need for traffic-control measures.

A ferry service operating between Brooke Street Pier in central Hobart and Bellerive Pier on the eastern shore is promoted as an alternative transport option for spectators attending major events at Bellerive Oval.

In an attempt to address parking and access issues, development of the oval has encroached upon adjacent properties and in particular the Bellerive Rotary Park situated between the oval and the beach. This park is on land owned by the Clarence Council as is the adjacent oval. As the oval is an exclusive, fenced-off area and the park is an inclusive area open to all residents, many residents reject the encroachment.
