= Iron Pot =

Island in Tasmania, Australia

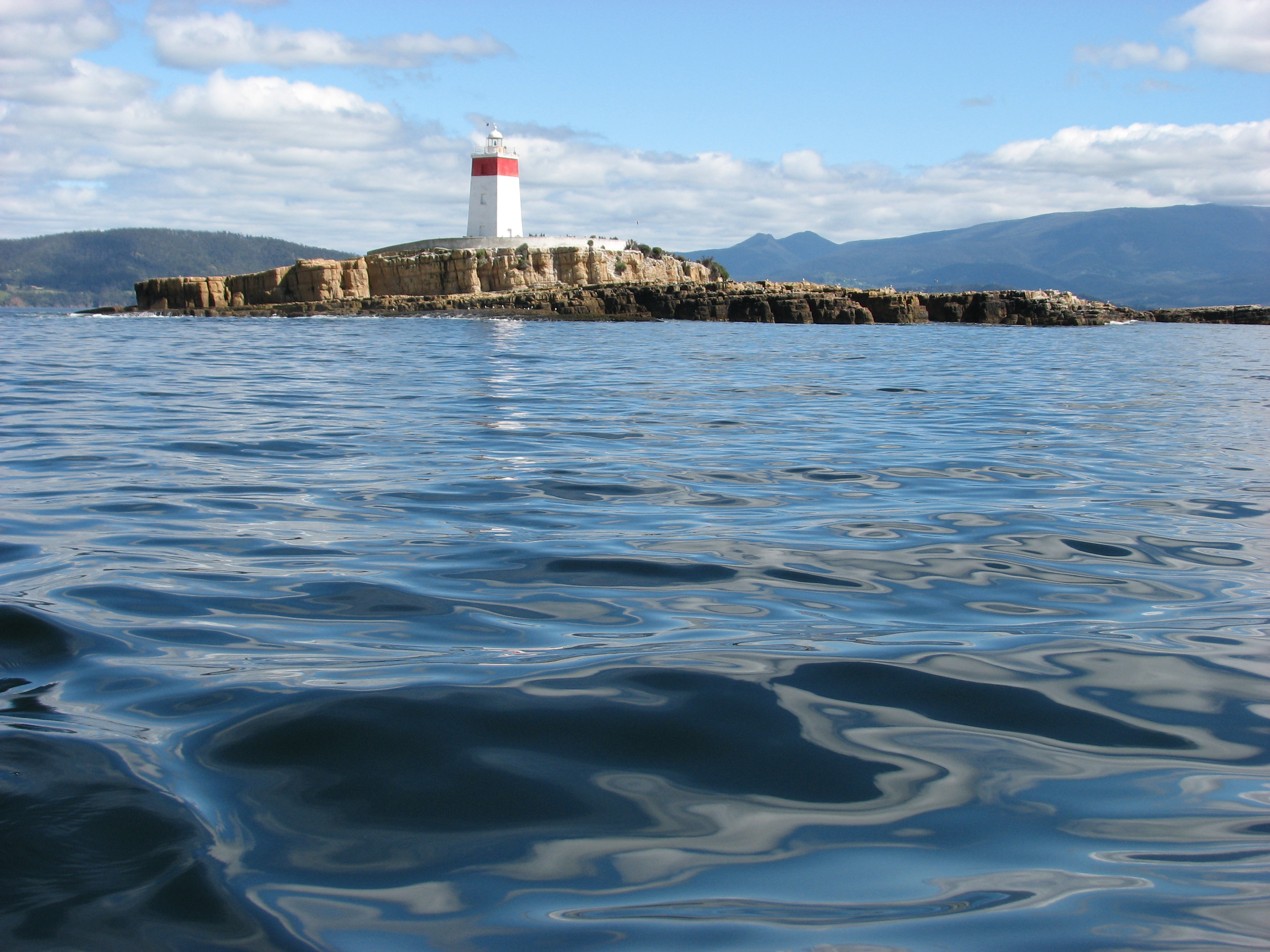
- Iron Pot Lighthouse on the island

- Location within Tasmania

Geography
- Location: River Derwent, Tasmania, Australia
- Coordinates: 43°03′31.4″S 147°25′01.9″E
- Area: 1.27 ha (3.1 acres)

Administration
- Australia
- State: Tasmania

Demographics
- Population: 0
- Pop. density: 0/km^{2} (0/sq mi)

Additional information
- Time zone: AEST (UTC+10)
  - Summer (DST): AEDT (UTC+11)
- Part of the Betsey Island Group

Iron Pot is a small, flat sandstone island of approximately 1.27 ha (3.1 acres) located near the entrance to the River Derwent in south-eastern Tasmania, Australia. It forms part of the Betsey Island Group and lies about 11 km (6.8 mi) southeast of Hobart. The island is best known as the site of the Iron Pot Lighthouse, the first lighthouse constructed in Tasmania, completed in 1832 to aid navigation into the River Derwent.

== History ==
Iron Pot is a small sandstone island located at the entrance to the River Derwent, where it marks the transition between Storm Bay and the sheltered waterways leading to Hobart. Its flat profile and exposed location made it a strategic site for marine navigation from the early days of European settlement.

The island became the site of Tasmania's first lighthouse, constructed in 1832 using convict labour and locally quarried stone. The Iron Pot Lighthouse was first lit on 16 November 1832. It was initially powered by whale oil, later upgraded to kerosene and acetylene gas, and eventually solar power in 1977 — becoming the first lighthouse in Australia to be solar-powered.

While Iron Pot is uninhabited today, it was formerly the residence of lighthouse keepers and their families. In 1884, lighthouse keeper James Parkinson moved to the island with his wife and children, establishing a permanent presence that continued in various forms until the station's automation in the 20th century. Supplies were delivered by boat and hoisted ashore via a derrick crane; remnants of which remain visible today.

In 1856, a colonial commission involving Tasmania, Victoria, New South Wales, and South Australia was formed in response to increasing maritime incidents. At that time, Tasmania fully maintained six coastal lighthouses (including Iron Pot) at a cost of £4,540 per year, collecting £6,515 in light dues. The colony also contributed to joint operations such as the Kent Group lights.

The origin of the name "Iron Pot" is uncertain. One theory suggests it may refer to an iron cauldron once used by whalers or early navigators as a rudimentary beacon before the lighthouse was constructed.

== Flora and fauna ==
Despite its small size and exposure to harsh maritime conditions, Iron Pot supports limited vegetation, including invasive species such as boxthorn (Lycium ferocissimum) and lupins (Lupinus spp.). The island serves as a breeding site for several seabird and wader species, including little penguins (Eudyptula minor), Pacific gulls (Larus pacificus), silver gulls (Chroicocephalus novaehollandiae), pied oystercatchers (Haematopus longirostris), and black-faced cormorants (Phalacrocorax fuscescens).

== Lighthouse ==
The Iron Pot Lighthouse remains a distinctive landmark at the mouth of the River Derwent. Constructed in 1832, it is Tasmania's oldest lighthouse and one of the oldest surviving in Australia. Technological upgrades over time reflect shifts in maritime safety practices, from manual oil lamps to fully automated solar power systems.

== Access and tourism ==
Iron Pot is uninhabited but accessible via guided tours operated by Pennicott Wilderness Journeys, departing from Constitution Dock in Sullivans Cove. These cruises allow visitors to view the lighthouse and the historic derrick crane used for unloading supplies. Due to its small size and shallow surrounding waters, access is limited and best achieved by boat from nearby South Arm.

== In popular culture ==
Iron Pot has featured in Tasmanian maritime folklore, art, and literature, often symbolising Hobart's seafaring heritage and early navigational infrastructure.
