= Port of Hobart =

Port in Hobart, Tasmania, Australia

- Interactive map of Port of Hobart
- Location in Tasmania

Location
- Location: Hobart, Tasmania, Australia
- Coordinates: 42°53′00″S 147°22′00″E

Details
- Operated by: TasPorts

Statistics
- Vessel arrivals: 359 (2023/24)
- Annual cargo tonnage: 1.6 million tonnes (2023/24)
- Annual container volume: 1,730 (2023/24)
- Website www.tasports.com.au

The Port of Hobart on the River Derwent is the main port of Hobart, Tasmania, Australia.

The historic part of the port was founded and developed in Sullivans Cove. Docks include Constitution Dock and Victoria Dock. In 2023/24, 1.6 million tonnes of freight passed through the Port of Hobart with 359 vessel movements.

== Administration ==
It is one of 12 ports administered by TasPorts. TasPorts was established on 1 January 2006 when Tasmania's four port companies; the Hobart Ports Corporation, Port of Launceston, Port of Devonport Corporation and Burnie Port Corporation, merged.

The Hobart Ports Corporation was previously named the Marine Board of Hobart.
