= Devonport Airport =

Airport in Tasmania, Australia

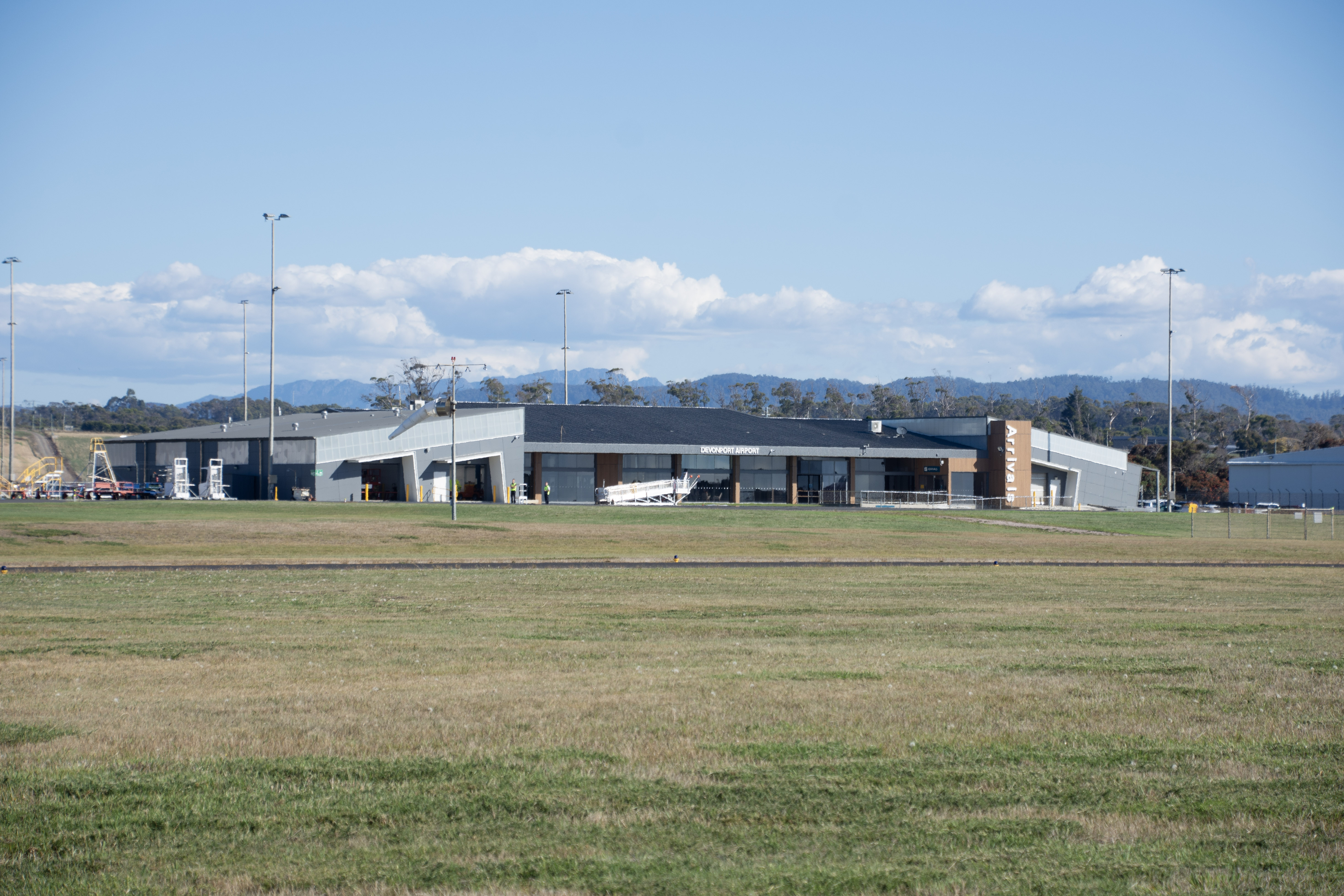
- IATA: DPO; ICAO: YDPO

Summary
- Airport type: Public
- Operator: TasPorts
- Serves: Devonport, Tasmania, Australia
- Elevation AMSL: 33 ft (10 m)
- Coordinates: 41°10′11″S 146°25′49″E
- Website: Devonport Airport

Maps
- Location in Tasmania
- Interactive map of Devonport Airport

Runways
Direction	Length		Surface
Direction	m	ft	Surface
06/24	1,838	6,030	Asphalt
14/32	880	2,887	Grass

Statistics (2010/11)
- Revenue passengers: 139,019
- Aircraft movements: 4,416
- Sources: Australian AIP and aerodrome chart, passenger and aircraft movements from the BITRE

Devonport Airport (IATA: DPO, ICAO: YDPO) is a regional airport serving Devonport, a city in the Australian state of Tasmania. It is located 10 km (6.2 mi) from the town centre at Pardoe Downs, on Wesley Vale and Airport Roads. The airport is operated by TasPorts which previously operated the larger Hobart Airport.

== History ==
Devonport Airport was officially opened in 1952, but its origins trace back to the 1930s, with significant development beginning in the late 1940s. In late 1990, the airport was being served by East-West Airlines. In late 2024 QantasLink began servicing the airport with their Q400's again replacing the older Q300's.

== Facilities ==
The airport is at an elevation of 33 ft (10 m) above sea level. It has two runways: 06/24 with an asphalt surface measuring 1,838 m × 45 m (6,030 ft × 148 ft) and 14/32 with a grass surface measuring 880 m × 30 m (2,887 ft × 98 ft).

== Airlines and destinations ==
Airlines	Destinations
QantasLink	Melbourne

== General Aviation ==
Devonport Airport supports a range of general aviation activities, including private, charter and training. The airport is regularly used by light aircraft such as Cessna, Aeroprakt, Cirrus, Beechcraft and Piper types, as well as touring aircraft transiting between mainland Australia and Tasmania. Its location on the north west coast makes it a convenient refuelling and stopover point for aircraft crossing Bass Strait. The Devonport Aero Club is located at the General Aviation area at Devonport Airport. Majority of the aircraft owners and hangar occupants are part of this Aero Club.

== Community ==
Devonport Airport is home to many aviation enthusiasts like aircraft owners, aero club members, plane spotters and flight schools. The aero club at Devonport Airport is called the Devonport Aero Club. The aero club has monthly meet ups where members can catch up and go for flights together. There are 3 flight schools at Devonport Airport, Ariel Aviation, John McBryde Flying School and Skyflyte Aviation. The airport is home to a few local plane spotters who you can find on Instagram, TikTok or Facebook.

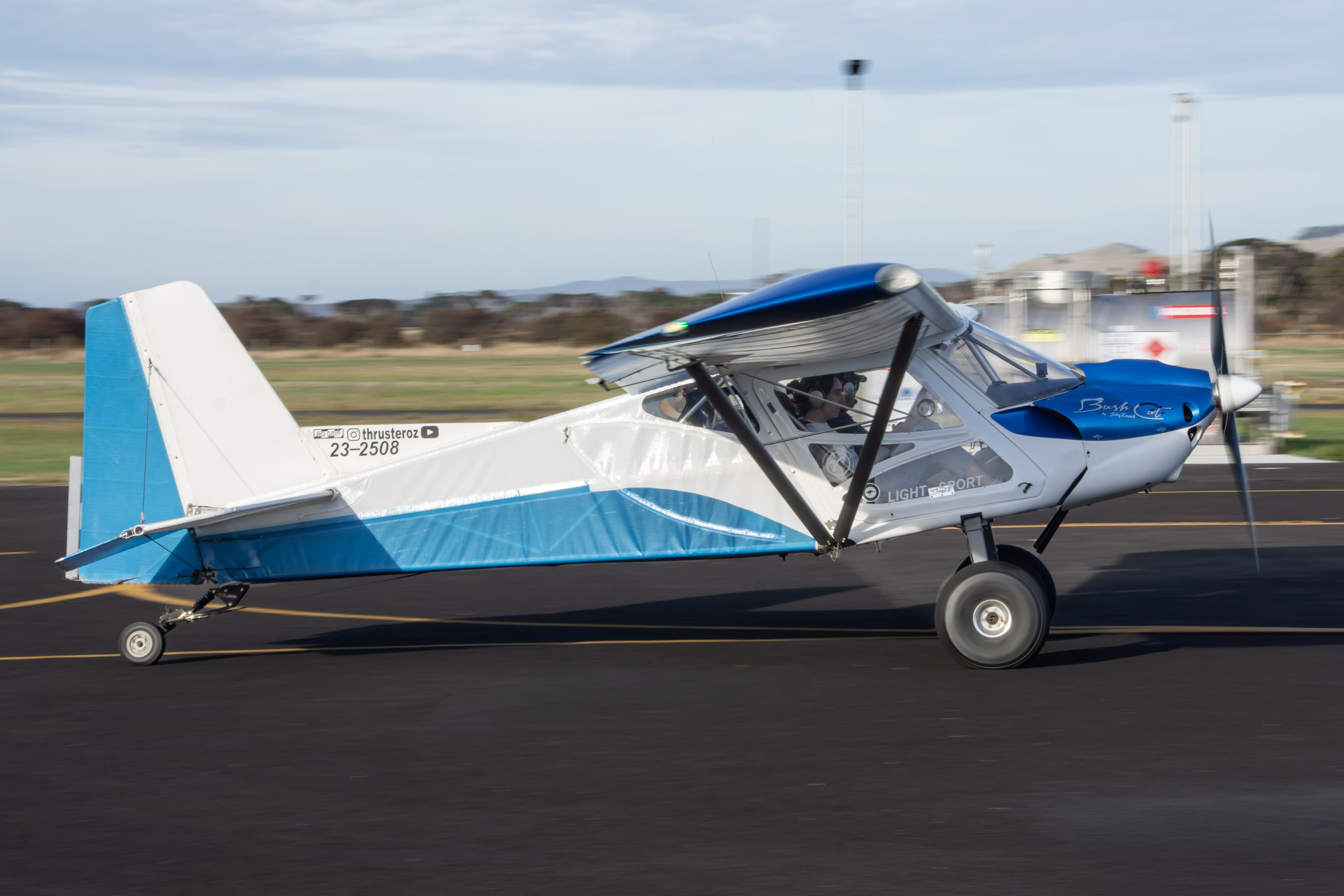
BushCat 23-2508 Taxing At Devonport Airport

== Statistics ==
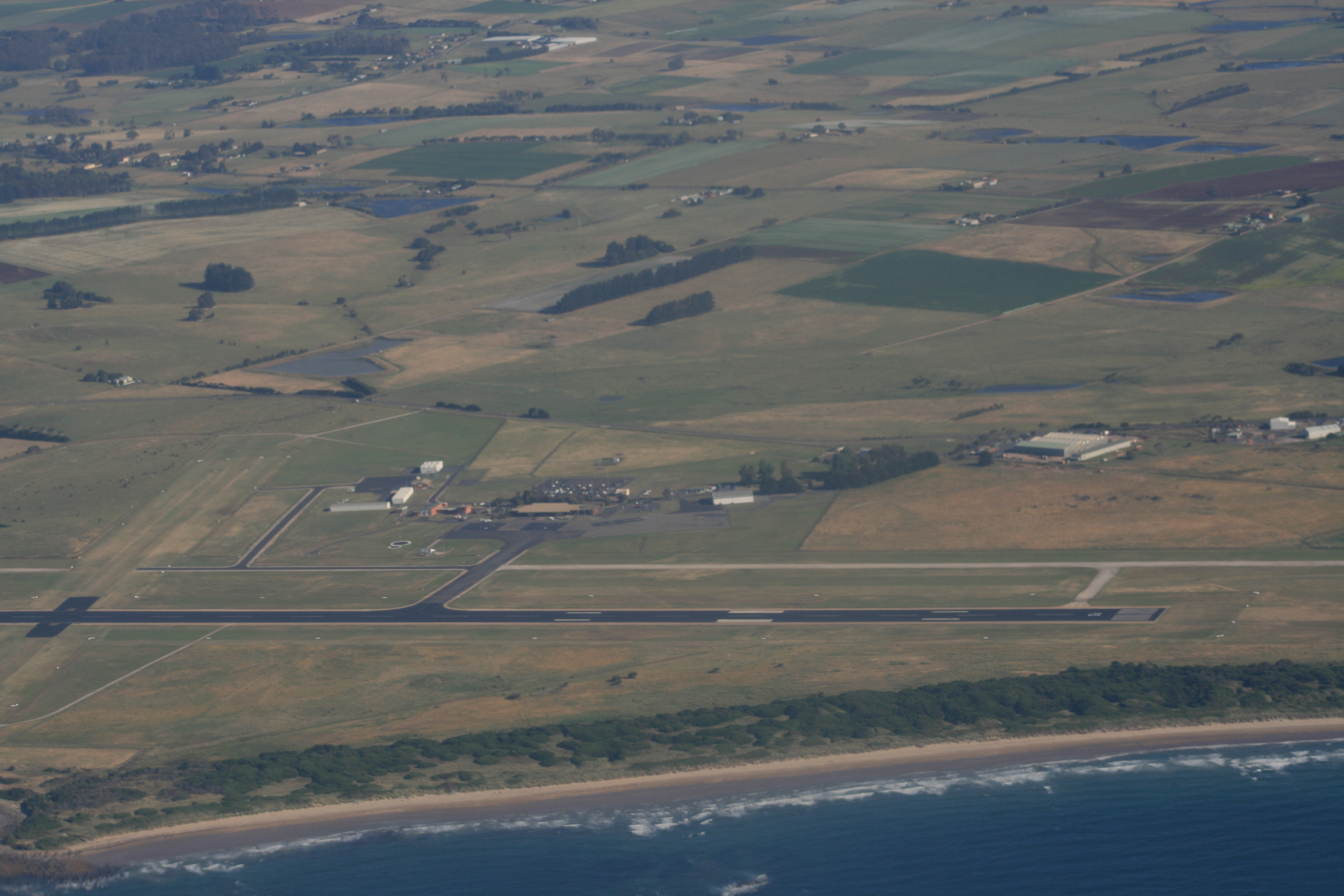
Devonport Airport from the air

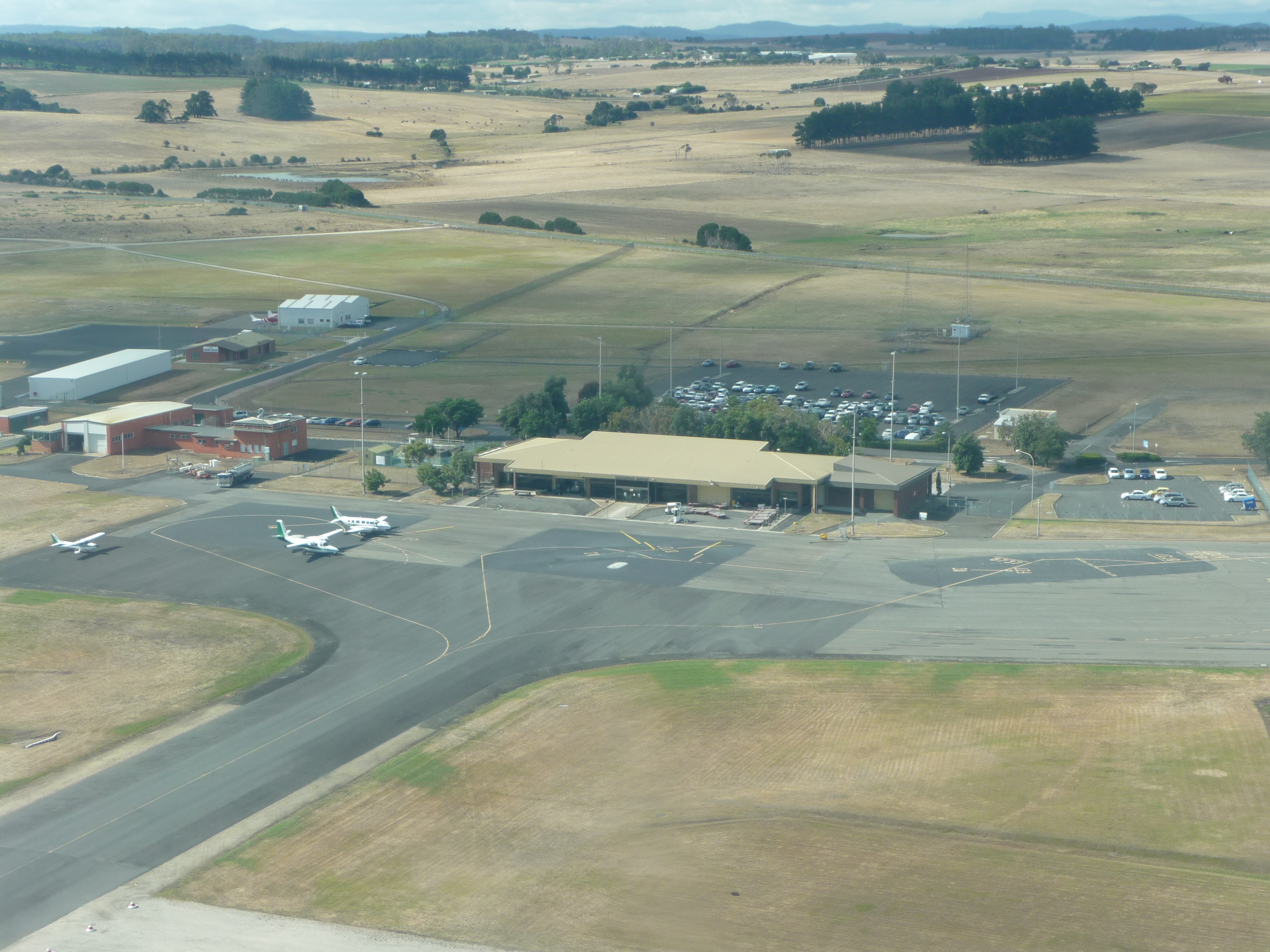
Devonport Airport facilities

Devonport Airport was ranked 40th in Australia for the number of revenue passengers served in financial year 2010–2011.

Annual passenger and aircraft statistics for Devonport
Year	Revenue passengers	Aircraft movements
2001–02	101,605	5,116
2002–03	109,388	5,271
2003–04	117,048	5,292
2004–05	116,139	5,648
2005–06	92,805	4,335
2006–07	88,308	4,423
2007–08	98,706	5,273
2008–09	114,514	4,623
2009–10	124,716	4,244
2010–11	139,019	4,416

Annual passenger and aircraft statistics for Devonport
Year	Revenue passengers
2012	135,700
2013	128,100
2014	135,800

== See also ==
- List of airports in Tasmania
