= Victoria Dock (Hobart) =

Dock in the Port of Hobart, Australia

Coordinates: 42.881771°S 147.334329°E

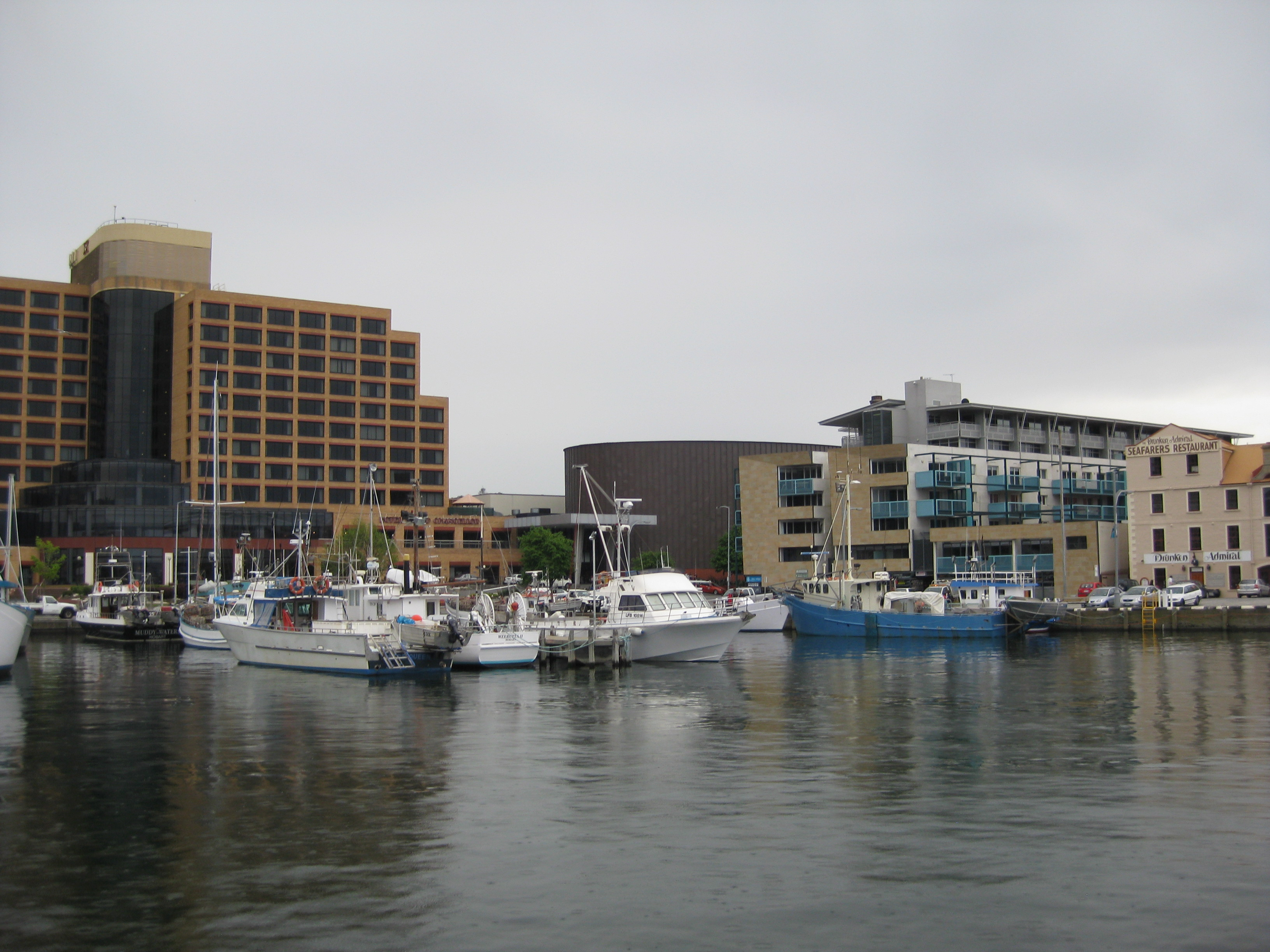
Fishing boats at Victoria Dock in November 2010

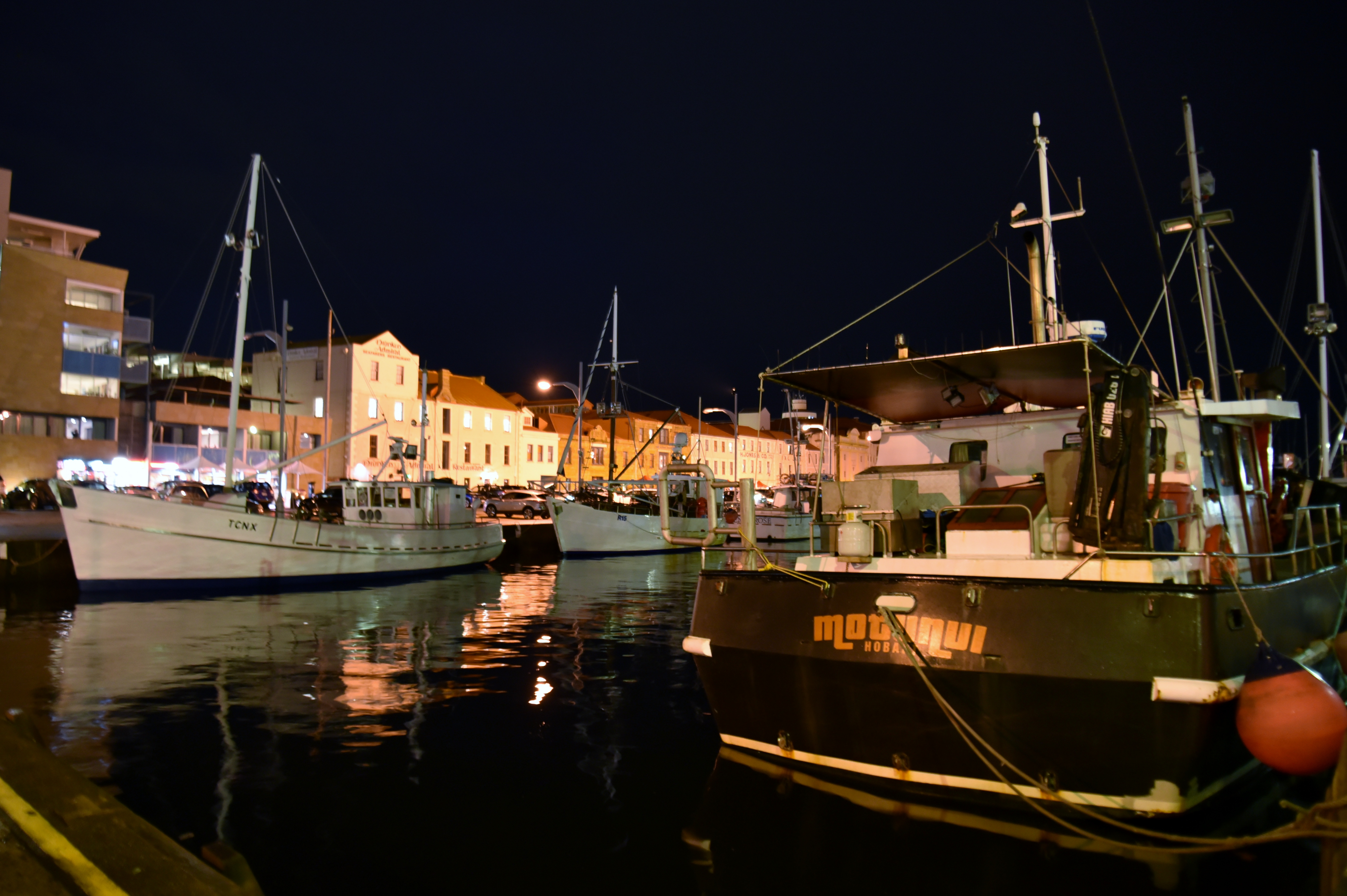
Victoria Dock to Hunter Street warehouses at night, 2019

Victoria Dock, in Hobart, Tasmania, Australia, is a key dock for Australian Antarctic supply vessels and one of the oldest docks in Tasmania.

== History ==
Victoria Dock was built in 1891. It is the home dock of most of Tasmanian fishing commercial boats which ply their trade along the state's coasts. Reference Page 373 Book by R.J. Sullivan "Urbanisation".

== Location in Hobart ==
Victoria Dock is located on the waterfront of Hobart at harbour side docks on the River Derwent. The dock is adjacent to other Hobart landmark areas such as Constitution Dock, Port Tower Building, Salamanca Place, Battery Point, and forms part of the foreshore of Sullivans Cove.

== Restaurants ==
Victoria Dock also has restaurants which sell fresh seafood caught by local fishermen.

== See also ==
- Constitution Dock
