= TasPorts =

Port authority for Tasmania, Australia

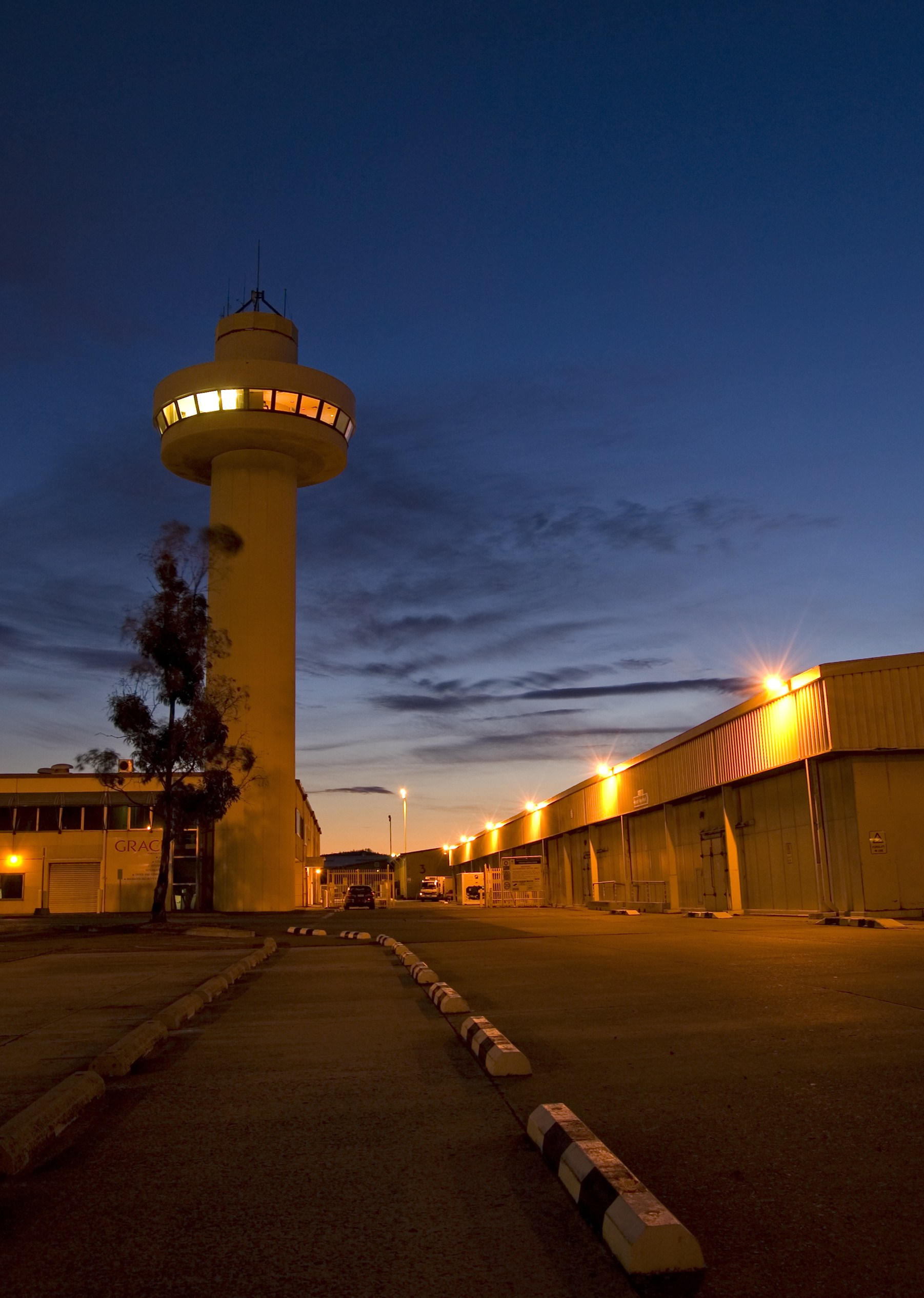
- Navigation tower at the Port of Hobart
- Company type: State-owned corporation
- Industry: Logistics
- Founded: 1 January 2006
- Founder: Government of Tasmania
- Headquarters: Launceston, Australia
- Area served: Tasmania
- Key people: Greg McCann (Chairman); Allan Gray (Chief Executive Officer)
- Services: Airport and port management
- Revenue: $184 million (2025)
- Net income: $11.8 million (2025)
- Number of employees: 338 (2025)
- Parent: Government of Tasmania
- Subsidiaries: Bass Island Line
- Website: www.tasports.com.au

TasPorts, officially the Tasmanian Ports Corporation, is a Tasmanian Government state-owned corporation that is responsible for the management and operation of all ports in Tasmania, Australia as well as Devonport Airport.

== History ==
TasPorts was established on 1 January 2006 and incorporated Tasmania's four port companies operating at that time; Hobart Ports Corporation, Port of Launceston, Port of Devonport Corporation and Burnie Port Corporation.

Historically most regional ports had their own Marine Board or similar bodies. In the 1950s there were Harbour Trusts and Marine Boards with local responsibility for movement within each local port facility. Marine Boards existed in Hobart, Launceston, Burnie, Strahan, Circular Head, King Island, Flinders Island and Devonport; and harbour trusts at Smithton and Ulverstone.

TasPorts also took over Devonport and Hobart airports. In December 2007 the latter was sold.

In August 2007, TasPorts purchased North Western Shipping & Towing Company's Tasmanian tugboat business. In April 2017, TasPorts commenced operating a service between King Island and Devonport under the Bass Island Line brand.

== Operations ==
=== Ports ===
- Bell Bay
- Burnie
- Devonport
- Grassy
- Hobart
- Lady Barron (Flinders Island)
- Stanley
- Whitemark (Flinders Island)

=== Airport ===
- Devonport
