= Princess Royal (1810 ship) =

History

Great Britain
- Name: Princess Royal
- Builder: Parkgate, Cheshire
- Launched: 1787
- Fate: Wrecked April 1810

General characteristics
- Tons burthen: 133, (bm)
- Sail plan: Schooner, then brig
- Complement: 12
- Armament: 2 × 4-pounder guns + 4 × 9-pounder carronades

Princess Royal was a snow launched in 1787, probably at Parkgate, Cheshire. She first appeared in Lloyd's Register (LR) in 1810.

Year	Master	Owner	Trade	Source
1810	W.Philips	H.Mullen	Liverpool–Faial	LR

Captain William Phillips received a letter of marque on 23 January 1810. Princess Royal was lost later that year at Faial Island.
