= Brooke Street Pier =

Pontoon building in Hobart, Tasmania

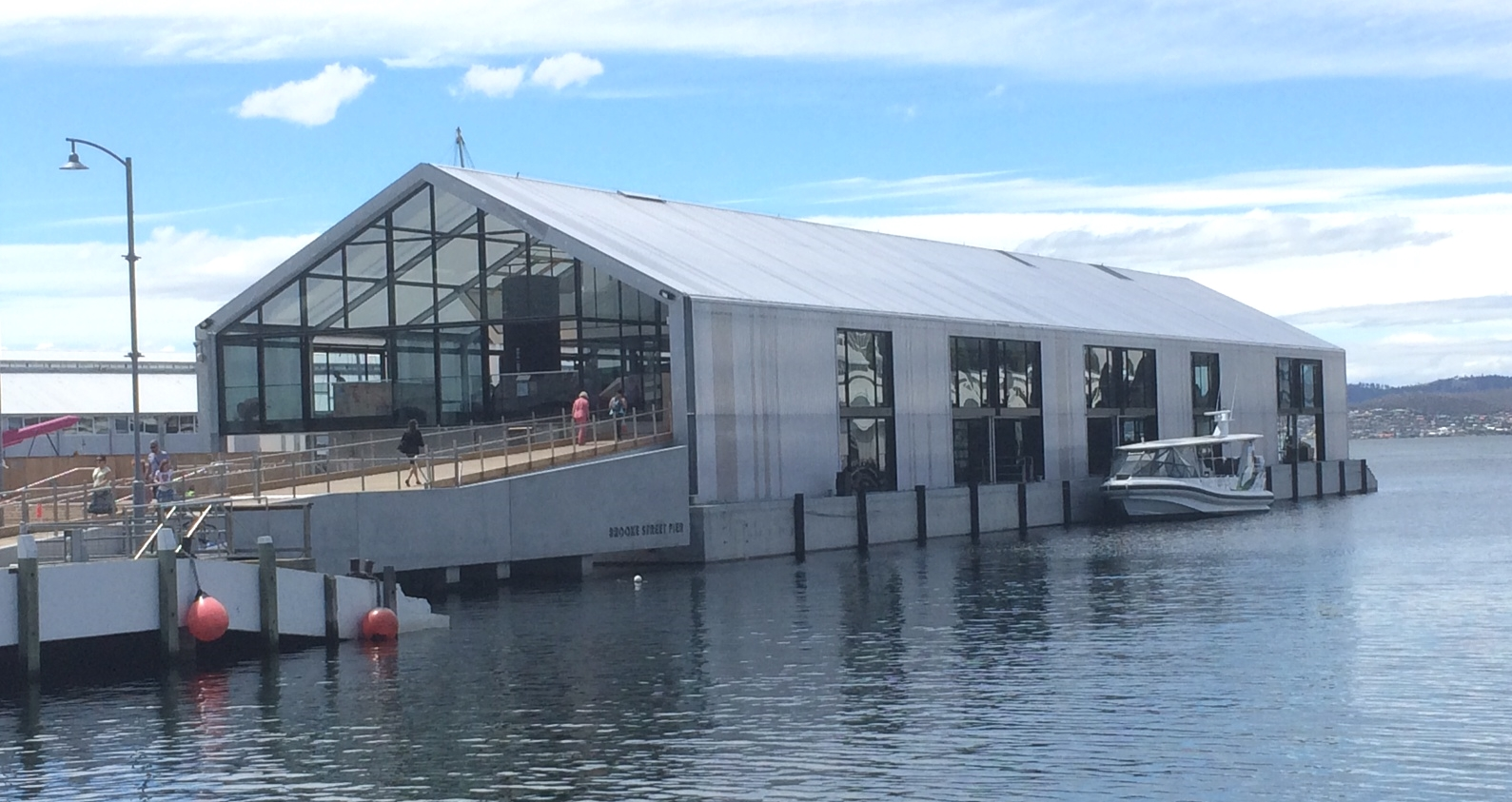
- Brooke Street Pier, January 2015

General information
- Status: Completed
- Location: Franklin Wharf, Hobart, Australia
- Coordinates: 42°53′05″S 147°19′58″E
- Elevation: Sea level
- Construction started: April 2014
- Opened: 21 January 2015
- Cost: A$13 million

Dimensions
- Weight: 4,200 t (4,134 long tons)
- Other dimensions: 80 m × 20 m (262 ft × 66 ft)

Technical details
- Floor count: 4

Design and construction
- Architect: Robert Morris-Nunn
- Architecture firm: Circa Morris Nunn
- Developer: Brooke Street Pier Development Corporation
- Structural engineer: Gandy and Roberts Pty Ltd
- Services engineer: Cundall
- Civil engineer: Gandy and Roberts Pty Ltd
- Other designers: Fred Barrett Yacht Design
- Main contractor: Fairbrother

Website
- brookestreetpier.com.au

The Brooke Street Pier is a floating pontoon building at Sullivans Cove in the waterfront area of the city of Hobart, Tasmania, Australia. It was constructed in 2014–15 at a cost of A$13 million. It weighs 5,300 tonnes (5,216 long tons) and was Australia's largest floating building upon completion. It is connected to the Hobart shore at Franklin Wharf, near the base of Brooke Street. Primarily a ferry terminal, the architect has described it as a "tourism transport hub".

== History ==
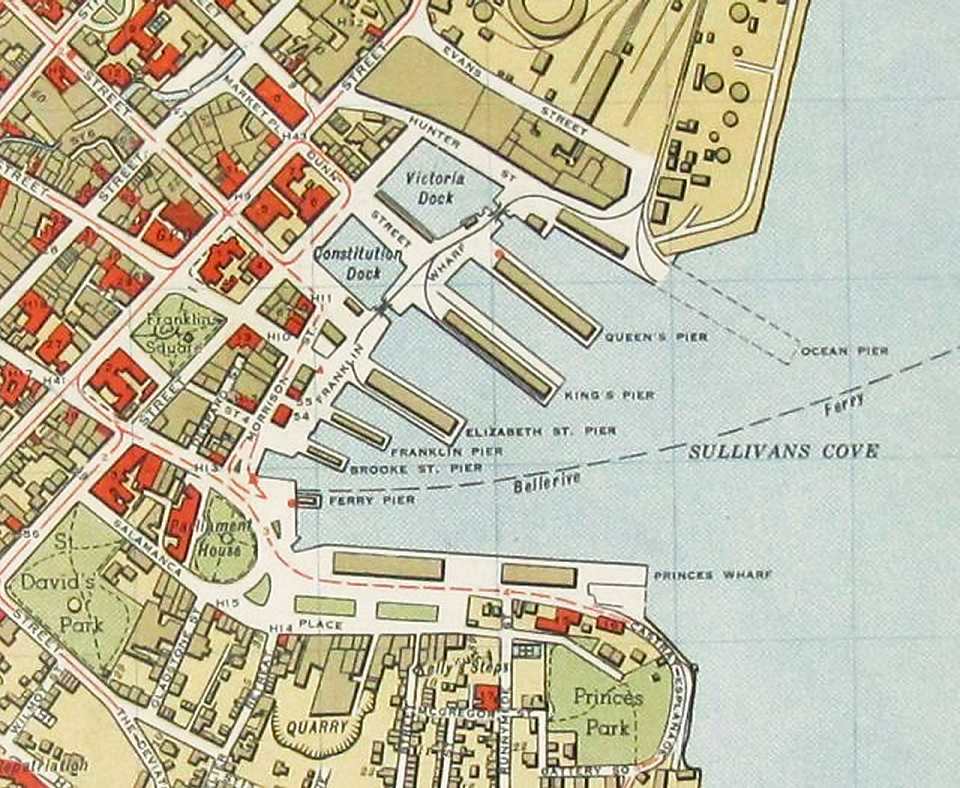
Sullivans Cove, in 1954

A pier at Brooke Street has existed since the 1820s. The earliest renovation of it on record occurred in 1879, after which the dimensions were 147 ft × 50 ft (45 m × 15 m). At the time, the pier was also known as Monarch Pier. Unlike the larger piers at the northern end of Franklin Wharf, Brooke Street Pier and the other piers in the vicinity did not have the capability for large volumes of cargo which would require overhead cranes.

In the 1960s, these piers were replaced with small freestanding jetties and were used for tourist cruise vessels. One of the larger companies providing these services is Navigators (originally Roche Bros) which has been operating from Brooke Street Pier since 1951.

The number of ferry passenger in Hobart increased from 90,000 in 2010 to over 300,000 in 2014. The old pier was unable to withstand this increase in traffic. One ferry operator suggested that the pier was "about to fall in the river".

The Government of Tasmania twice called for expressions of interest from the private sector in redeveloping Brooke Street Pier. The first was in 2007 – the successful respondent was a consortium named Hunter Developments, which included Federal Hotels, Navigators and Simon Currant. Their proposal included multiple wharves, including a hotel. The design was considered out of character for the Sullivans Cove area and in January 2009 Hunter Developments announced the cancellation of the hotel proposal.

The second attempt came in 2010. A development application was lodged with the Hobart City Council in April 2012. In June 2012, the state and federal governments agreed to contribute A$5 million to the redevelopment, and project commencement was announced in December 2013.

== Construction ==
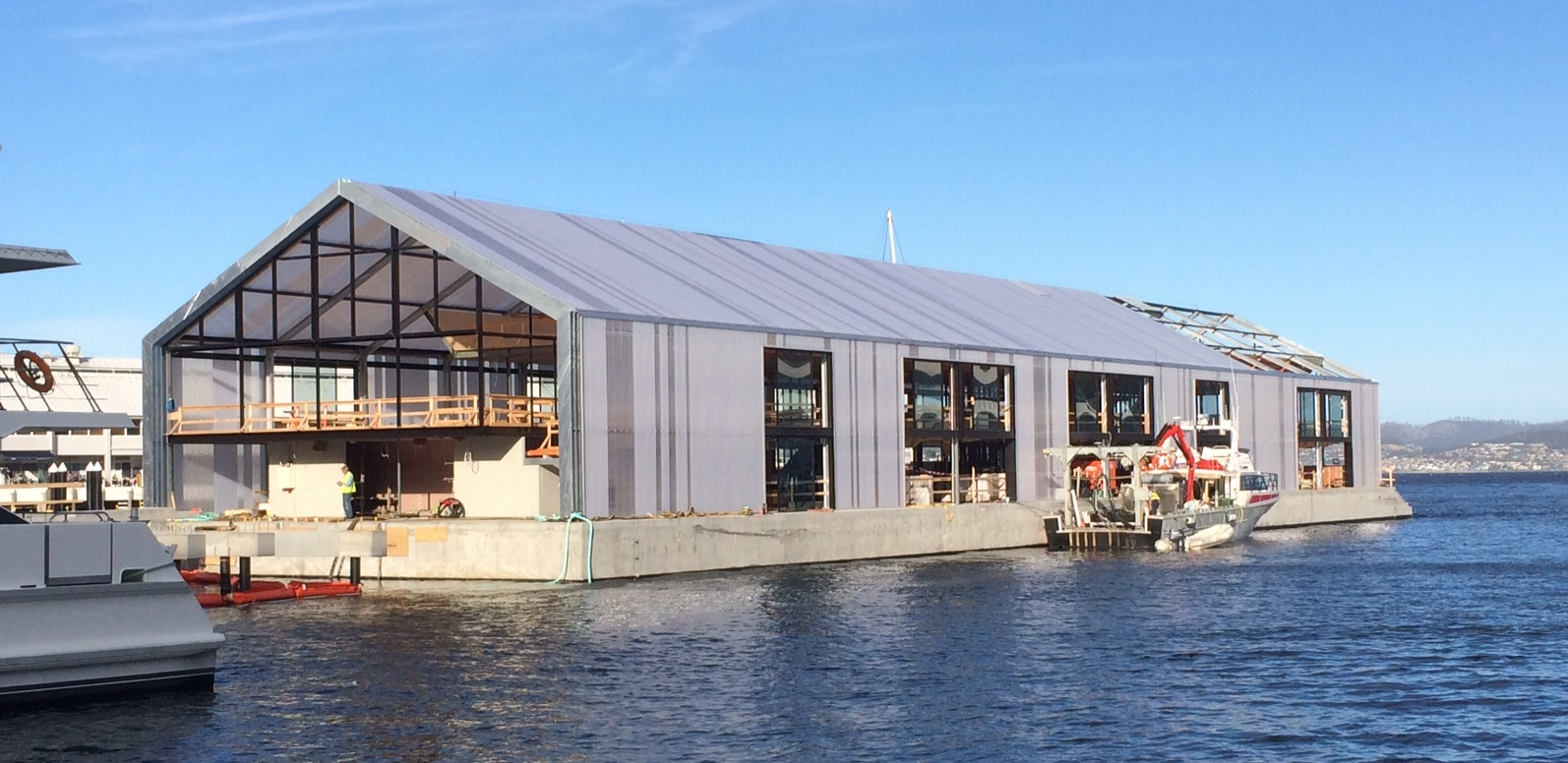
Brooke Street Pier shortly after being towed into location in November 2014

Construction started in April 2014 at Incat, a ferry manufacturer based at Prince of Wales Bay. In November 2014 the partially completed structure, then weighing 4,000 t (3,937 long tons), was towed 8 km (5 mi) down the river to be positioned at its final location. It is anchored to the sea-bed using the Seaflex environmental mooring system. The structure is 80 m (262 ft) long by 20 m (66 ft) wide and is four levels tall. One concrete basement level sits 4 m (13 ft) below the water's surface and includes services such as kitchen facilities, storage, toilets and hydronic heating and cooling systems. The 65 toilet communal facility is also genderless, and features waste evacuation directly down to the seawater under the pier, increasing feeding opportunities for local sealife. The three above-water levels are enclosed in a semi-translucent polycarbonate cladding injected with nanogel, creating a diaphanous skin and keeping the structure as light as possible. This cladding contains LED lights, which gives the pier a glowing effect in the evening.

Environmental considerations taken into account when designing the building include the polycarbonate cladding, used for natural light and passive heating; and a hydronic heating and cooling system using the constant temperature of the sea water below the pontoon. As a floating structure, it will not be affected by rises in the sea level. The unique mooring system by Seaflex allows the structure to rise and fall with the tides while remaining stable and in position. The gabled roof design is intended to fit in with the other buildings in Sullivans Cove including PW1, Elizabeth Street Pier and the Mac02 Cruise Terminal – which themselves are based on the historic use of the area as a freight port.

== Facilities ==
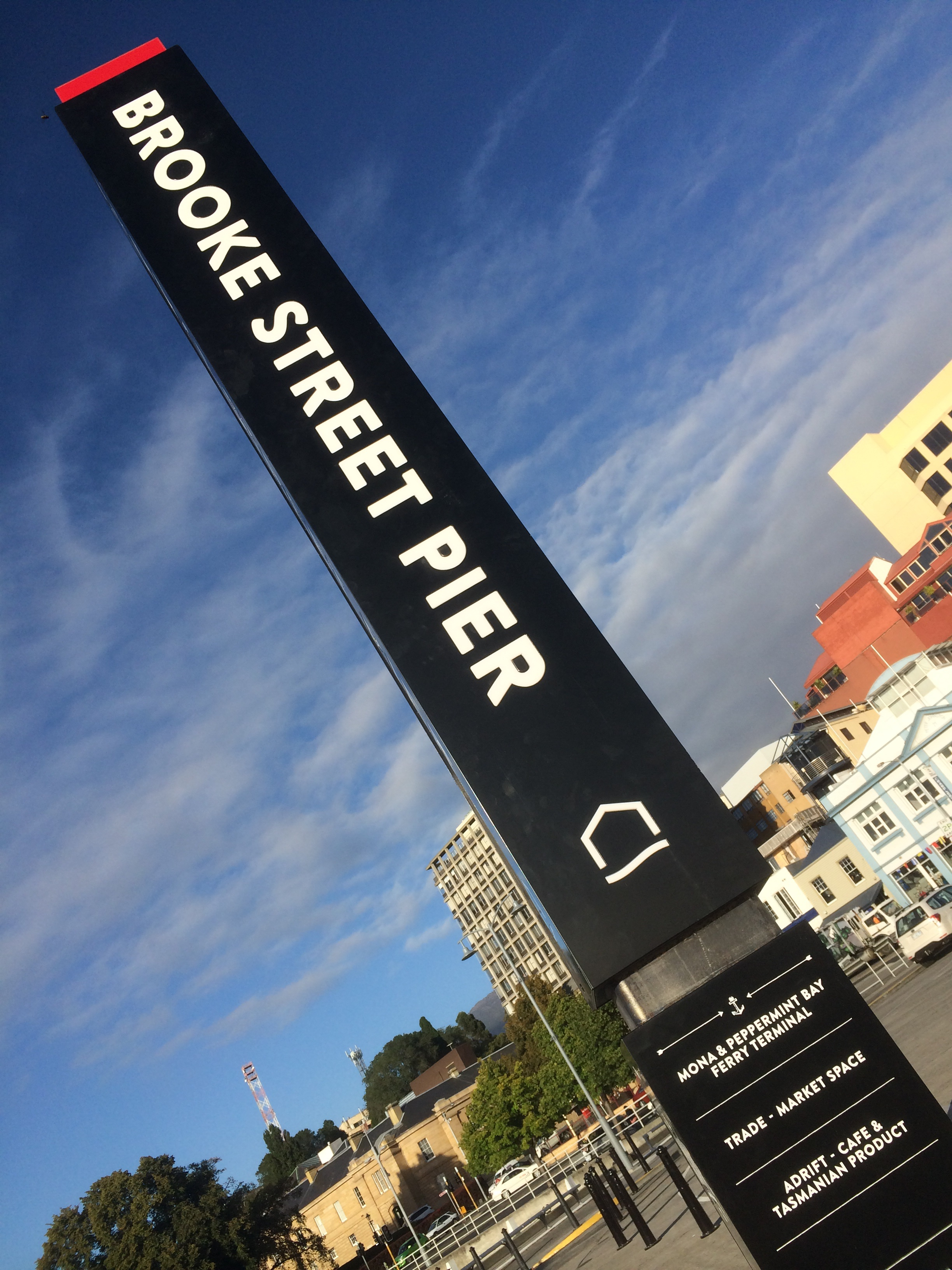
Sign outside the pier

The pier is primarily a ferry terminal – key tenants are Navigators (operator of the MONA ferry) and Peppermint Bay Cruises. There are also a public space and a market area for other tourism operators and suppliers of Tasmanian produce, such as seafood, dairy, wine and whisky. Outside of ferry operating hours, the terminal level can be used as an event space for up to 1,200 people.

The largest permanent tenant is a restaurant, The Glass House, run by Islington Hotel's David Meredith, and featuring Ikuei Arakane as head chef. It also hosts a café ("Adrift"), and an espresso bar ("Bright Eyes", run by the owners of Pilgrim Coffee). Trade stallholders selling Tasmanian products include Valhalla Icecream, Huon Aquaculture, TasmanianMarket, Grandvewe Cheeses, Moorilla Estate and McHenry Distillery. The pier also offers free wifi for patrons visiting the terminal.
