= Constitution Dock =

Harbourside dock in Hobart, Tasmania, Australia

Coordinates: 42°52′57″S 147°19′59″E

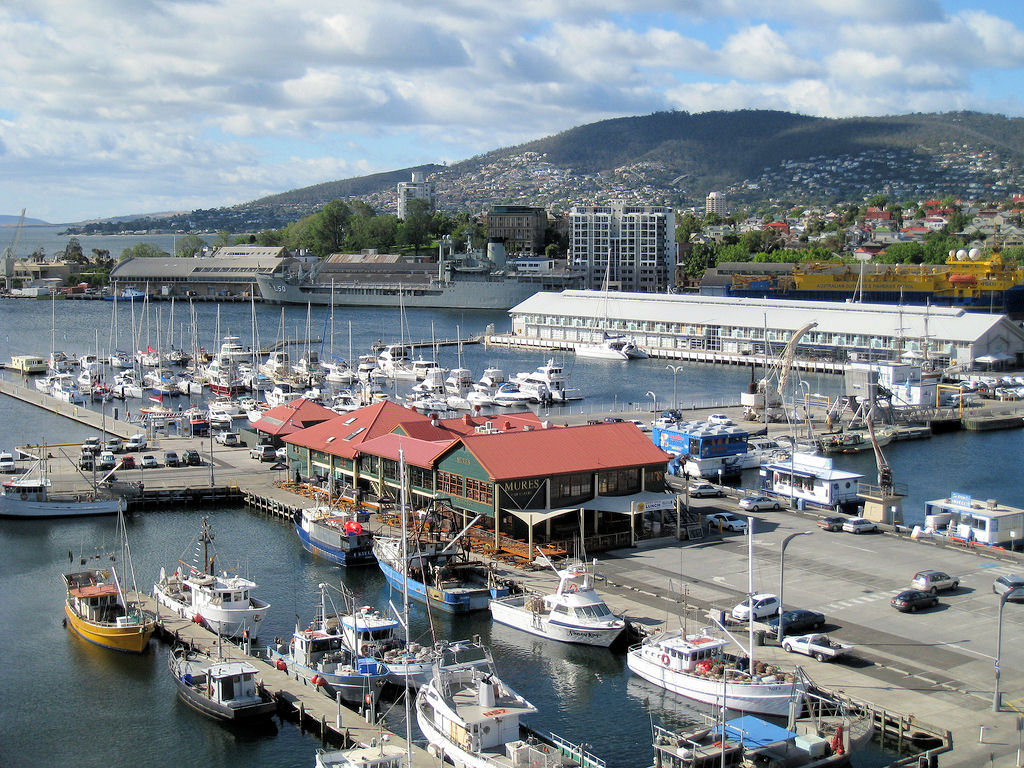
Constitution Dock

Constitution Dock is the harbour-side dock area of Hobart, the capital city of the Australian state of Tasmania, in the Port of Hobart, on the River Derwent.

The dock is adjacent to other Hobart landmark areas, Victoria Dock, Salamanca Place and Battery Point, and forms part of the foreshore of Sullivans Cove.

The dock consists of a rock-walled marina with an opening for boats. The bridge is normally closed, allowing pedestrian access around the dock. The dock is normally used by motor pleasure boats, yachts, and fishing boats serving the city's fish market and restaurants, several of which are at the northern end of the dock.

Constitution Dock is famous for being the rallying point and party venue for the annual Sydney to Hobart Yacht Race, held from Boxing Day (the day after Christmas Day) until yachts complete their 630 nautical mile journey from Sydney.
