= Sullivans Cove =

Cove in Hobart, Tasmania, Australia

Coordinates: 42°53′07″S 147°20′04″E

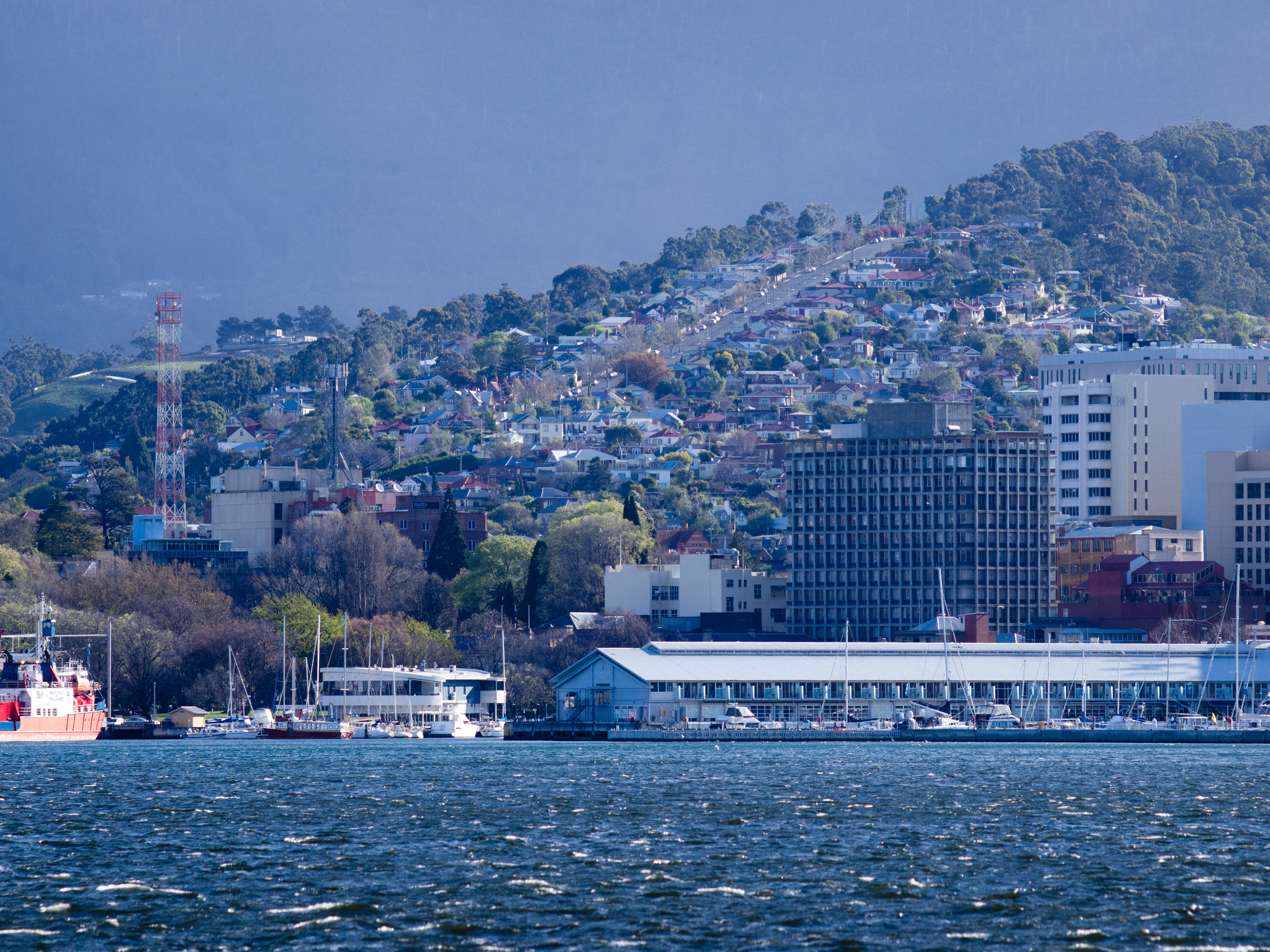
Sullivans Cove

Sullivans Cove is on the River Derwent adjacent to the Hobart central business district in Tasmania, Australia. It was the site of initial European settlement in the area, and the location of the earlier components of the Port of Hobart.

== History ==
The cove was the initial landing site of what is now the city of Hobart. It was founded on 21 February 1804 by Lieutenant Governor David Collins, who travelled to the shore via what was then a rocky island named Hunter Island. The connection to the shore was developed and is now known as Hunter Street. The island now has a building directly above it.

Although the first European settlement in the state was further up the river at Risdon Cove by John Bowen a year earlier, that settlement was abandoned and relocated to join the Sullivans Cove settlers.

Collins named Sullivans Cove after John Sullivan, Permanent Under Secretary to the Colonies.

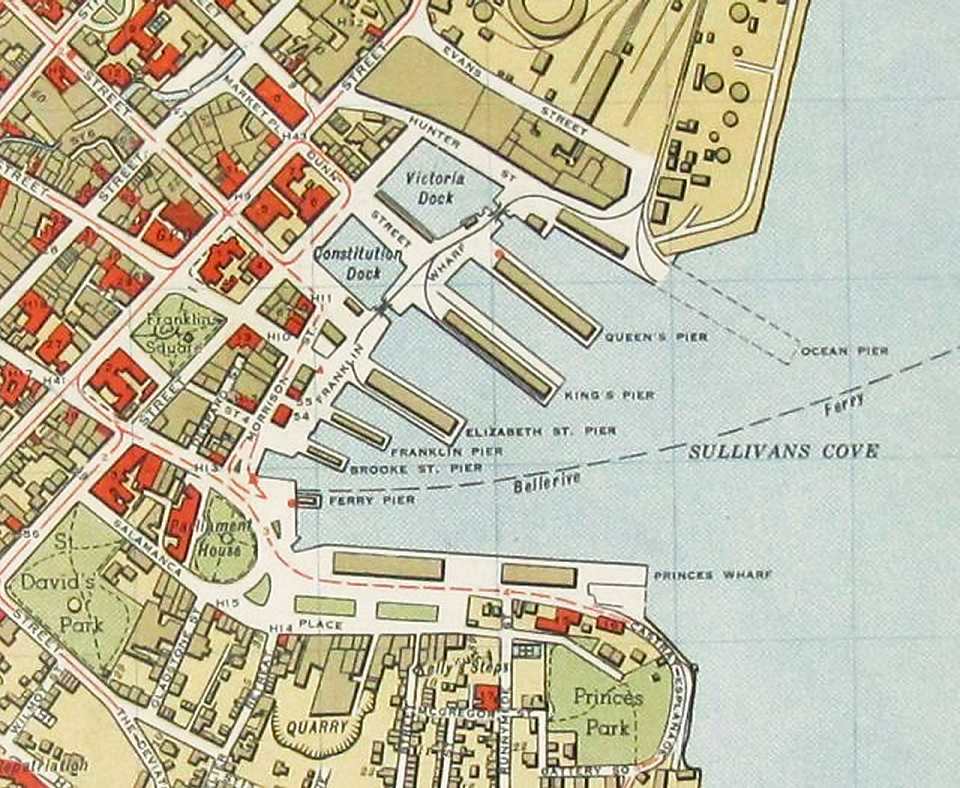
1954 map of Sullivans Cove

By 1916, several piers had been constructed: from north to south:

- Ocean Pier (built 1914)
- Queens Pier (originally Alexandra Pier, renamed in 1910)
- Kings Pier (built 1910)
- Argyle Street Pier (built 1875)
- Elizabeth Street Pier (built 1866)
- Franklin Pier
- Brooke Street Pier (built 1820s, renovated 1879).
- Ferry Pier

In 1933, the Argyle Street and Elizabeth Street Piers were replaced with a single concrete-reinforced structure at Elizabeth Street Pier.

In 1947 there was a proposal to replace Queens and Kings Pier with an extra wide pier, but this was never realised. In 1948, Ocean Pier was destroyed by a fire.

Kings Pier was demolished and replaced with a marina for commercial and private craft, around 1970. This marina increased in size in 2003.

== Current ==
Sullivans Cove holds large historical and sentimental value for the city. The cove area itself is now known as Macquarie Wharf and serves as the main port for the city. Many of the original buildings along the esplanade are still standing.

The University of Tasmania's School of the Arts building is based on Hunter Street.

A serviced apartment building, ZeroDavey, drew some criticism for its blue Davey Street facade, though it has some sandstone to blend in with the Hunter Street warehouses.

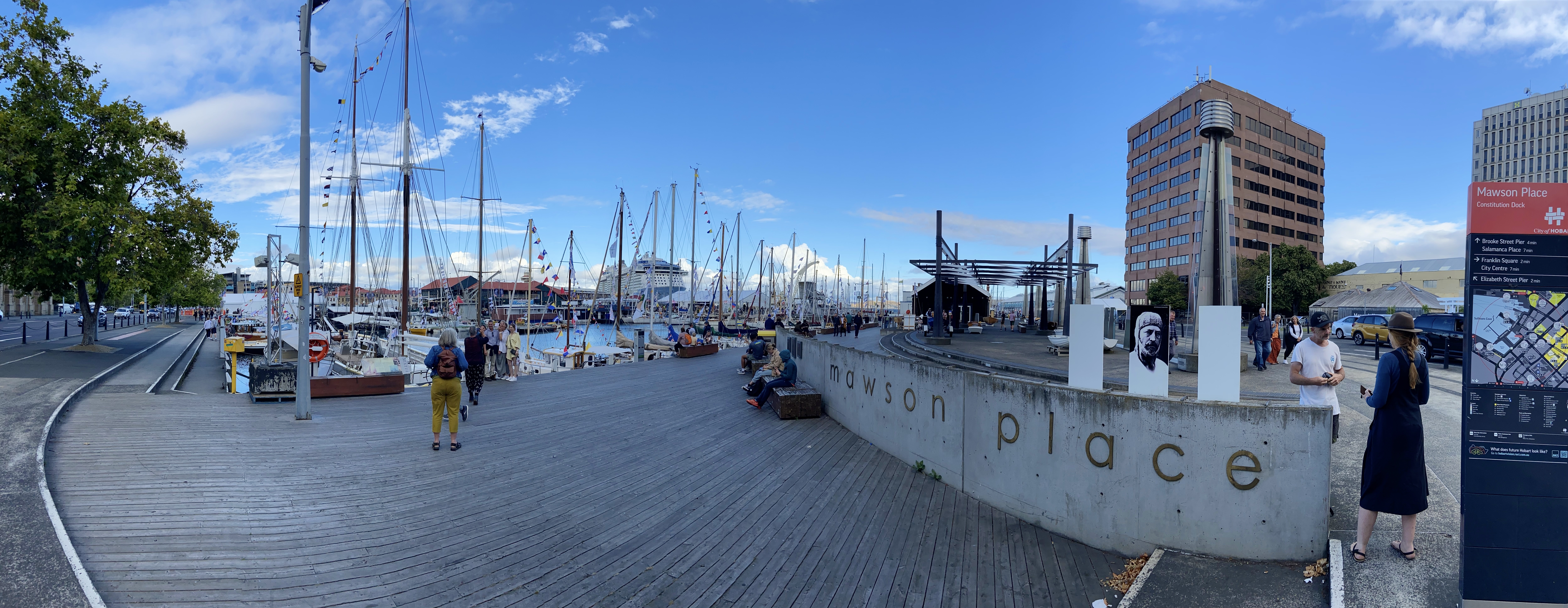
Panorama of Mawson Place

During 2004 there has also been discussions about a proposal for a tourist tram from Sullivans Cove to the CBD, and possibly to North Hobart.

An international design competition was held for the Hobart waterfront in 2006. It attracted 280 entries from over 50 countries. Three winners were announced on January 26, 2007, including entries by Jeppe Aagaard Andersen, Preston Lane Architects and Tony Caro Architecture. Many proposals indicated a return to the Hobart Rivulet as a canal on its original alignment at Constitution Dock, with a civic and reconciliation space linking the Hobart City Hall. The designs were not for construction.

With the change in the cove's primary activity from a freight port to tourism and recreational uses, many of the sheds in the area have been either re-purposed or replaced – notably, all buildings keep the former gabled roof architecture. These buildings include:

- Elizabeth Street Pier – restaurants, bar and function space
- Princes Wharf Shed No. 1 – redeveloped as PW1 event space in 2011
- Princes Wharf Shed No. 2 – replaced in 2012 as the University of Tasmania's Institute for Marine and Antarctic Studies centre
- Macquarie Wharf Shed No. 1 – replaced in 2017 by Macq01 luxury hotel
- Macquarie Wharf Shed No. 2 – redeveloped in 2013 as MAC02 cruise ship terminal
- Brooke Street Pier – replaced in 2014–2015 with a ferry terminal/tourism transport hub

Additional development in the immediate area include a $100m redevelopment of Parliament Square, behind Parliament House. In 2015, a vacant lot and the Mawson's Huts replica were proposed to be redeveloped into a Civic Square.
