= Berriedale =

Berriedale can refer to:

- Berriedale, Tasmania, in Hobart
- Berriedale, Highland, Scotland, best known for the Berriedale Braes
- Berriedale, Jamaica, in the area of Portland.

See also:

- Berridale, New South Wales
