= Harry Memmott =

Australian artist

Harry Memmott (1921-1991) was an Australian ceramic pottery artist.

== Early life ==
Harry Attridge Memmott was born in Brisbane, Queensland in 1921, the son of Harry Memmott, a bootmaker and his wife Amy Sandison. He spent his childhood in Annerley. His grandfather, J.T. Sandison, who had trained at Bendigo Pottery, owned a pottery works in Annerley and in addition to the kilns, they had a rich supply of local clay. Sandison was known for his speed of throwing and large pots, with most of his work in the creation of pots for gardens. Memmott studied art at the Brisbane Technical College with a growing circle of local artists. He married Estelle “Cootch” Powell in 1943, and after serving in World War II in the army intelligence unit, he took up the offer of retraining which was generally made available to former servicemen. He completed a Fine Art course at the East Sydney Technical College alongside John Rigby, Margaret Cilento and Margaret Olley.

== Career ==
Memmott, his wife “Cootch”, who would later take up pottery and twin sons returned to Brisbane in 1950 and he set up a business making silk screen prints and picture frames. Sandison pottery was being run by Memmott's uncle, George Sandison and former industrial chemist, Mervyn Feeney. Mass production of pots overseas closed most of the commercial Brisbane pottery firms in the early 1950s. Memmott learnt to throw pots on a wheel at Sandisons under the guidance of George Sandison's partner, Mervin Feeney, alongside another artist and radio announcer, Milton Moon. In the mid-1950s, Memmott took over a section of the works and produced studio pottery and a range of souvenir wares for commercial markets, featuring Aboriginal designs and other works designed for the holiday souvenir market, fired in an electric kiln.

In the late 1950s, Memmott began a studio pottery school. He visited Japan in the late 1960s and moved to the Dandenong Ranges, Victoria, to take up a position at the Prahran Technical College. His wife took over the studio pottery business.

In 1970 Memmott published The Australian Pottery Book - a way with clay: the comprehensive guide to pottery. He returned to Brisbane in 1977, and continued to work as a potter until 1985. He died in 1991.

== Legacy ==
The Sandison Pottery site was sold and a housing estate known as Potter's Place was proposed for the area to honour its legacy. Memmott's pieces are marked with 'Harry Memmott' on their base and are sought after by collectors and galleries.
