= 1984 Queen's Birthday Honours (Australia) =

The 1984 Queen's Birthday Honours for Australia were announced on Monday, 11 June 1984, by the office of the Governor-General.

These honours were appointments by some of the 16 Commonwealth realms of Queen Elizabeth II to various orders and honours to reward and highlight good works by citizens of those countries. The Birthday Honours are awarded as part of the Queen's Official Birthday celebrations during the month of June.

== Order of Australia ==
=== Companion (AC) ===
==== General Division ====
Recipient	Citation	Notes
Neil Andrew Smith, CMG	For service to the community, particularly through administration of the Victorian Bush Fire Appeal (1983) Trust Fund	

==== Military Division ====
Branch	Recipient	Citation	Notes
Navy	Vice Admiral David Willoughby Leach, AO CBE MVO	For service to the Royal Australian Navy, particularly as Chief of Naval Staff	
Air Force	Air Marshal Selwyn David Evans, AO DSO AFC	For service to the Royal Australian Air Force, particularly as Chief of Air Staff	

=== Officer (AO) ===
==== General Division ====
Recipient	Citation	Notes
Professor Kenneth John Campbell Back	For service to education	
Dr Alexander Boden	For service to the community and science	
Professor Geoffrey Curgenven Bolton	For service to education	
Harrison Bryan	For service as a librarian	
Leslie William Ralph Cave	For services to commerce and industry	
Dr David Owen Crompton	For service to medicine, particularly in the field of ophthalmology	
Professor Graeme Reade Anthony Ellis	For service to science, particularly in the field of radiophysics	
Michael Gleeson-White	For service to commerce and to the arts	
Albert Keith Johinke	For public service, particularly in the field of public transport	
James Bolton Leslie, MC	For service to the aviation industry and to community and cultural affairs	
Neville John McCarthy	For public service, particularly as Director Commonwealth Serum Laboratories, and for service to the community	
Dr Ian Gordon McWilliam	For service to science and technology	
Robert Lyndhurst Piesse	For service to primary industry, particularly in the development of fencing techniques	
The Most Reverend Donald William Bradley Robinson	For service to religion	
Ernest James Lyle Turnbull	For service to media	
Professor Jerzy Zubrzycki, CBE	For service to ethnic welfare	

==== Military Division ====
Branch	Recipient	Citation	Notes
Navy	Rear Admiral Michael Wyndham Hudson	For service to the Royal Australian Navy, particularly as the Flag Officer Commanding Her Majesty's Australian Fleet	
Army	Major General Raymond Jack Sharp, RFD ED	For service to the Army Reserve	
Army	Brigadier Raymond Alan Sunderland	For service to the Australian Army	
Air Force	Air Vice Marshal John William Newham	For service to the Royal Australian Air Force	
Air Force	Air Commodore Ian Traill Sutherland	For service to the Royal Australian Air Force	

=== Member (AM) ===
==== General Division ====
Recipient	Citation	Notes
Claudio Piperno Alcorso	For services to the arts, education and to ethnic welfare	
Ida Lessing Faith Bandler	For service to Aboriginal welfare	
Elizabeth Lorna Bartlett	For service to the community, particularly in the field of women's and children's welfare	
Marina Berezowsky	For service to ballet	
Dr Peter Bernard Botsman	For service to the arts and education	
Geoffrey Wilfred Bottrill	For service to the accountancy profession	
Nancy Fotheringham Cato	For service to Australian literature	
Emeritus Professor Avon Maxwell Clark	For service to education, particularly in the field of biological science	
Harold Spencer Cottee	For service to the community	
The Reverend Dr David Ray Cox	For service to ethnic welfare	
Brother Quentin Michael Duffy	For service to education and to religion	
Margreta Ann Enid Elkins	For service to opera	
Giuseppe Emanuele	For service to the building industry	
John Edward Ferris	For service to the building industry and to the community	
Maxwell Raymond Finlayson	For service to local government	
Jack Lovett Fitzgerald	For service to the community, particularly with the Salvation Army	
Eugene Kenneth Foreman	For public service, particularly in the development of statistical methods in Australia and PNG	
Gordon David Geeves	For service to the welfare of people with disabilities	
John Meighen Gibbs	For service to children's welfare	
John Clifford Hamilton	For service to the sport of Australian football	
William Howard	For public service, particularly in the field of defence science	
Raymond Barraclough Jennison	For service to local government and to the community	
Stanley Patrick Kelly, DFC	For service to banking	
Dr Ernest Joseph Kirby	For service to the community	
Professor Kwong Chiu Lee Dow	For service to education	
Faye Lo Po	For service to education and to the community	
Ronald Grant Lyon	For service to architecture	
Denis James Martin	For service to the Australian manufacturing industry	
Dr Ian Haig McConchie	For service to medicine, particularly in the field of thoracic surgery	
Kathleen Louise McCredie	For service to education	
Regis Maria McKenzie	For service to nursing	
Stephen Hamar Midgley	For service to the conservation of freshwater fish species	
Dr Roy Markham Mills	For service to thoracic medicine	
Dr Reginald Mills	For service to education and to science, particularly in the fields of physical and electro-chemistry	
Milton Moon	For service to ceramic arts, particularly pottery	
Ian Kenneth Morton	For service to rural development, particularly through the Rural Finance Commission	
Cyril Joseph Nethery	For service to the welfare of the ageing	
Geoffrey Malcolm Oscar	For service to the pharmacy profession	
Professor Beverley Raphael (Rickarby)	For service to medicine, particularly in the field of psychiatry	
Dr William David Lindsay Ride	For service to science and education, particularly in the fields of zoology and biology	
Judith Mary Roberts	For service to the community, particularly women's affairs	
Amedeo Filiberto Sala	For service to the electronics industry	
Max Edmund Schubert	For service to the wine industry	
Vernon John Schuppan	For service to the sport of motor racing	
Francis Joseph Sweeney	For service to accountancy and to commerce	
Maximilian Sean Walsh	For service to journalism	
Alexander Storry Walton	For service to the Australian film industry, particularly as director of the Australian Film and Television School	
Frederick William Whitby	For service to trade unionism	
Ronald Thomas White	For service to local government and to the community	
Mary Alice Whitehead	For service to the community, particularly women's affairs	
Lindsay Gordon Wilson	For service to primary industry, particularly vegetable growing and marketing	
Professor Dianne Yerbury	For service to education, particularly in the fields of industrial relations management and public administration	

==== Military Division ====
Branch	Recipient	Citation	Notes
Navy	Lieutenant Commander Michael Victor Butler	For service to the Royal Australian Navy	
Navy	Commodore Donald Morton Coulson	For service to the development of Naval Supply Support	
Navy	Lieutenant Commander William Warland Farrell	For service to the Musician Branch of the Royal Australian Navy	
Navy	Captain Peter Ian Murdoch Ferguson	For service to the Royal Australian Navy, particularly as Director of Naval Training	
Army	Lieutenant Colonel Peter William Brooks, ED	For service to the Army Reserve	
Army	Major Sidney Harold Cheeseman	For service as Officer Commanding 1st Watercraft Workshop	
Army	Lieutenant Colonel Peter John Fitzpatrick	For service as Commanding Officer 2nd Signal Regiment	
Army	Major Geoffrey Thomas Hawker	For service to workshop equipment and facilities engineering in the Australian Army	
Army	Colonel David Robert Lawrence	For service as the Commandant of the Army Apprentices School	
Army	Lieutenant Colonel Robert William McLeod, RFD	For service as Commanding Officer 10th Battalion, The Royal South Australian Regiment	
Army	Major Neil Colin Smith	For service to the Australian Army in the field of explosive ordnance disposal in the Solomon Islands	
Army	Major James John Arundel Wallace	For service as Officer Commanding 1st Special Air Service Squadron	
Army	Brigadier Ian Rignold Wills	For service as Commander 2nd Supply Group	
Air Force	Wing Commander Richard John Campbell	For service as Senior Engineering Officer, No 5 Squadron, Royal Australian Air Force	
Air Force	Wing Commander Leo Francis James	For service as Commanding Officer, Number 1 Operational Support Unit, Royal Australian Air Force	
Air Force	Flight Lieutenant James Graham Kelley	For service to the joint exercise planning staff, Exercise Kangaroo 83	
Air Force	Wing Commander Anthony Edward Lowe	For service as a staff officer at Headquarters Operational Command, Royal Australian Air Force	
Air Force	Squadron Leader Barbara Ann Fillery McKeown	For service as a nursing officer in the Royal Australian Air Force	
Air Force	Wing Commander Richard James Pavey	For service as the Director of Computerised Supply Systems, Air Force Office	

=== Medal (OAM) ===
==== General Division ====
Recipient	Citation	Notes
Arthur Peter Acton	For service to the manufacturing industry, particularly in the field of packaging	
Ernest Ross Alcorn	For services to primary industry and to the community	
Kenneth Robert Alexander	For services to the welfare of ex-service personnel	
Major Raymond Ernest Allen	For service to the community, particularly with the Salvation Army	
Genevieve Louise Batterham	For service to people with disabilities	
Harold George Berry	For service to the community, particularly in the Melbourne Ambulance Service	
Dr Arthur Bruce Biggs	For service to the community and medicine	
John Henry Penn Blick	For service to the fruit growing industry	
Ruth Bontschek	For service to people with disabilities	
Hazel Irene Boyle	For service to the community, particularly in the welfare of the hearing impaired	
James Brennan	For service to Aboriginal welfare	
Kenneth Idwal Brine	For service to the building industry and to education	
Fred Philip Bromley	For service to the community, particularly welfare of people with disabilities	
Thomas Francis Brooks	For service to the sport of cricket and baseball	
Bertie Brownlow	For service to sport, particularly cricket and hockey	
Christine Ann Burton	For service to the sport of netball	
Ernest David Carey	For service to public service to the Northern Territory	
Michael Cecil Claybourn	For service to the sport of surf lifesaving	
May Clifford	For service to music	
Alexander Gerald Colley	For service to conservation	
Richard Walter Condon	For service to soil conservation	
John Conochie	For service to the community, particularly the welfare of the ageing	
Elsie Reid Coutts	For service to the community	
Dr Clare Alice Cunningham	For service to medicine, particularly the welfare of children with disabilities	
John Patrick Cusack	For service to the dairy industry	
Kenneth Roy Davis	For service to the community, particularly the welfare of the ageing	
Francis Albert Di Blasi	For service to the community, particularly migrant welfare	
Winifred Hilda Dickinson	For service to the sport of croquet	
Raymond Mills Durie	For service to the sport of athletics	
Tom Efkarpidis	For service to the Greek community in Australia	
Joan Lora Ellice-Flint	For service to the community and to education	
Pauline Jean English	For service to sport, particularly in relation to people with disabilities	
Robert Wilford Farr	For service to local government and to the community	
Harveline Featonby	For service to education, particularly children with disabilities	
Councillor Robert William Fell	For service to local government and the sport of yachting	
Robert Bruce Ferguson	For service to the community and to local government	
Charles Douglas Fielder	For service to the sport of surf lifesaving	
Marjorie Miriam Fitz-Gerald	For service to the community and to local government	
Norma Vere Fletcher	For service to welfare through the Riding for the Disabled Association	
Maureen Freer	For service to Australian literature	
John Andrew French	For service to the community	
Clarence George Garnsworthy	For service to the community	
Harry Hans Gerstle	For service to the community, particularly through the Royal Queensland Bush Children's Health Scheme	
Cedric Frederick Godden	For service to the community, particularly the welfare of people with disabilities	
Robert William Gotts	For service to the furniture manufacturing industry	
Edward Raymond Graham	For service to athletics	
Kenneth Dunstan Grant	For service to the sport of rowing	
Dorothy Green	For service to Australian literature	
Helen Margaret Hanrahan	For service to the community	
Betty Hargreaves	For service to the community	
Ralph Nicholas Harris	For service to education, particularly in relation to those with impaired hearing	
Jane Ann Hennessy	For service to the community	
Victor Herman	For service to trade unionism and to the community	
Raynham Ross Holloway	For service to local government	
Leslie John Howard	For service to the sport of rugby union football	
John Henry Hudswell	For service to the community	
Winifred Humbley	For public service, particularly with the Department of Foreign Affairs	
Edwin Charles Hyland	For service to local government and to the community	
Louisa Agnes Ingram	For service to Aboriginal welfare	
Stephen John Jani	For service to ethnic welfare	
Frank Milton Jeffree	For service to welfare of the ageing	
David Gordon Jones	For service to local government and to the community	
Elsie Rose Jones	For service to education, particularly in relation to Aboriginal culture	
Eric Lloyd Jory	For service to the community	
Nancy Monica Joyce	For service to nursing	
Samuel Karpin	For service to the Jewish community in Australia	
David Harold Kemp	For service to the community	
William Kidston	For service to the community, particularly in relation to co-operative societies	
Alfred Charles King	For service to the community	
Jean Ruby Lashbrook	For service to the community, particularly as a member of the Country Women's Association	
Julia Lawrence	For service to the community	
Arthur Geoffrey Lee	For service to scouting and to the community	
Conrad Augustus Lembke	For service to forestry	
Reginald Lenaghan	For service to local government and to the community	
Edward James Long	For service to the community, particularly in relation to co-operative societies	
Margaret Annette Rose Mack	For service to the welfare of people with disabilities	
Margaret Davidson Mackie	For service to education	
Neville Patrick Maguire	For service to the community	
William George Manly	For service to local government and to the community	
Jack Louis Maver	For service to the scouting movement	
Klaus Wilhelm Mayer	For service to the German community in Australia	
Naomi Ruth Mayers	For service to Aboriginal welfare	
Alderman Raymond Cousins McCormack	For service to local government	
Richard Bede McCosker	For service to the sport of cricket	
Henry George McDermott	For service to local government to the community	
Heather May McDonald	For service to education, particularly in relation to children with disabilities	
Norman Thomas McMahon	For service to the sport of cricket	
Neil William McNamara	For service to local government	
Ernest Edward McQuillan	For service to the sport of boxing	
The Reverend Canon Alfred Ernest Miller	For service to the community, particularly in relation to welfare service	
John Stewart Murray	For service to Aboriginal welfare	
Percival George Nash	For service to the community	
Margaret Jean Newson	For service to the community, particularly through the Bendigo Art Gallery	
Stanley Linton Nicholls	For service to sport, particularly athletics	
Edward Moses Obeid (rescinded 2014)	For service to ethnic welfare	
Reverend Brother Joseph Felix O'Connor	For service to education and to religion	
John Edward O'Grady	For service to the welfare of ex-service personnel	
Kevin O'Mahoney	For service to the blind	
Leslie Norman O'Neill	For service to the community and to education	
James Douglas Omond	For service to the community	
Walter George Parr	For service to education, particularly in relation to those with impaired hearing	
Alice Sadie Parsons	For service to the community	
Philemon Pearson	For service to Aboriginal welfare	
Mervyn George Nicholas Pentreath	For service to the community	
Nina Phillips	For service to the community	
William Rorke Pullar	For service to the welfare of people with disabilities	
Garnet Keith Putland	For service to the sport of lawn bowls	
Captain Douglas Orry Quayle	For service to religion	
Harry Rankine	For service to the dairy industry, to local government and to the community	
Noel Lanceter Rawson	For service to the welfare of ex-service personnel	
Kevin Francis Riordan	For service to local government and to the community	
James Galway Riordan	For service to the community	
Barbara Winifred Robertson	For service to the welfare of people with disabilities	
Sarah Helen Robinson	For service to the welfare of the ageing and to the community	
Roland Edward Robinson	For service to literature, particularly in the preservation of Australian Aboriginal mythology	
Irene Dorothy Robinson	For service to the community	
Maureen Roebuck	For service to the community	
Joseph Stanley Russell	For public service	
David William Ruston	For service to floriculture	
Dr Gordon Francis Saggers	For service to the community	
Dr Gordon Edgecombe Sanders	For service to the community	
Herbert Joseph Sawbridgeworth	For service to the welfare of the ageing	
Reginald Arthur Shaw	For service to the community, particularly to the Volunteer Fire Brigade	
Pamela Yvette Moxey Sheppard	For service in the field of occupational therapy	
Ernest Maurice Silverton	For service in the sport of lawn bowls	
Ronald Edwin Slaughter	For service to the egg production industry	
Sydney John Snell	For service to the sport of lawn bowls	
Henry Leopold Speagle	For public service	
Gregory Michael Stadtmiller	For public service, particularly to the welfare of seamen	
Herbert Geoffrey Stevens	For service to athletics	
Zbigniew George Sudull	For service to the Polish community in Australia	
Evelyn Margaret Thompson	For service to music	
Patricia Thomson	For service to trade unionism, particularly the welfare of working men	
Marjorie Isabel Enever Todd	For service to the Armidale community for over 50 years	
Eric James Tremethick	For service to the welfare of ex-service personnel	
Marjorie Alice Trewin	For service to the community	
George William Harry Turnbull	For service to the sport of lifesaving	
John Joseph Roy Turner	For service to medical techniques, particularly in the field of anaesthetics	
Captain Ernest Victor Watkins	For service to the community	
Roy William Whalan	For service to the community and to horticulture	
Graham Ross White	For service to sport	
David Williams	For public service in maintaining lighthouse equipment	
Betty Norma Wilson	For service to medical laboratory technology	

==== Military Division ====
Branch	Recipient	Citation	Notes
Navy	Chief Petty Officer Phillip Leslie Davis	For service to the Naval Stores Department HMAS Hobart	
Navy	Chief Petty Officer Brian Lawrence Eagles	For service as Assistant to the Defence and Naval Attache, Paris	
Navy	Chief Petty Officer Brian James Furner	For service to the Clearance Branch Royal Australian Navy	
Navy	Chief Petty Officer Robert John Jeffreys	For service as a senior physical training instructor in the Royal Australian Navy	
Navy	Warrant Officer Kenneth John McMiles	For service to the Royal Australian Navy	
Navy	Chief Petty Officer Paul Prince	For service as Barrack Master HMAS Creswell	
Navy	Warrant Officer Robert Edgar Sanders	For service as the Marine Engineering Officer HMAS Kimbla	
Army	Warrant Officer Class Two Warren Herbert Bradd	For service as an instructor to Junior Leaders in the Australian Army	
Army	Warrant Officer Class One Warren John Burns	For service to the Royal Australian Regiment as Regimental Sergeant Major	
Army	Warrant Officer Class One Allan Cordwell Burrows	For service as Warrant Officer Coordination in the Office of the Chief of the General Staff	
Army	Warrant Officer Class Two Janet Fay Capper	For service as Chief Clerk, District Unit Brisbane	
Army	Warrant Officer Class Two Peter James Greenbury	For service as Quartermaster Sergeant, 106 Field Workshop	
Army	Warrant Officer Class One Eric Barry Neville Hampson	For service as Master Gunner, Field Force Artillery	
Army	Warrant Officer Class One Ian Peter Hartshorn	For service as the Artificer Sergeant Major, 16 Air Defence Regiment Workshop	
Army	Warrant Officer Class Two Allan Stephen Hill	For service as movements supervisor Canungra Transport Unit	
Army	Warrant Officer Class Two Neil John Jamieson	For service as Supervisor Technical Communication, 6th Signal Regiment	
Army	Warrant Officer Class Two Frank Frederick Bastiaas Mallee	For service to the Australian Army in the field of clerical administration	
Army	Warrant Officer Class One Alec Kevin Mead	For service as Divisional Pay Liaison Officer, 1st Division	
Army	Warrant Officer Class One Ross Edward Smith	For service as Regimental Sergeant Major, 1st Aviation Regiment	
Army	Warrant Officer Class Two James Brenton Willshire	For service to the Special Air Service Regiment	
Army	Warrant Officer Class Two Kenneth John Wilson	For service as Caterer, 2nd Field Supply Battalion	
Army	Sergeant Richard William Wilson	For service to the Royal Australian Corps of Transport Pipes and Drums	
Air Force	Sergeant Alan James Coyte	For service as an electrical fitter at No 486 Squadron, Royal Australian Air Force	
Air Force	Warrant Officer Reginald Harry Robert Manners	For service in the field of explosives ordnance disposal in the Royal Australian Air Force	
Air Force	Warrant Officer Charles William Eric Marney	For service to communications security in the Royal Australian Air Force	
Air Force	Warrant Officer Ian Reginald McKellar	For service to technical publication support in the Royal Australian Air Force	
Air Force	Sergeant Maurice Gordon McPhillips	For service as an electrical fitter in the Royal Australian Air Force	
Air Force	Warrant Officer Michael Gerald Page	For service to the School of Photography, Royal Australian Air Force	
Air Force	Flight Sergeant Kenneth John Rawlins	For service as an electrical fitter at Base Squadron, Darwin	
Air Force	Warrant Officer William James White	For service as a general fitter at No 2 Aircraft Depot, Royal Australian Air Force	
