= Beverley Raphael =

Australian psychiatrist

Beverley Raphael AM FASSA
- Born: 4 October 1934; Casino, New South Wales, Australia
- Died: 21 September 2018 (aged 83)
- Education: University of Sydney
- Employer(s): University of Sydney; University of Newcastle

Beverley Raphael AM FASSA (4 October 1934 – 21 September 2018) was an Australian psychiatrist and academic. She was the first woman to be appointed professor of psychiatry in Australia.

== Early life and education ==
Beverley Raphael was born in Casino, New South Wales on 4 October 1934. She attended Casino High School and in the Leaving Certificate was second in the State in physics and chemistry. While studying medicine at the University of Sydney she was a resident of the Women's College from 1952 to 1957. She received a Doctor of Medicine from the University of Sydney for her thesis "Preventive intervention with the crisis of conjugal bereavement", described by leading Australian psychiatrist Patrick McGorry as a "landmark study of widows and bereavement".

== Career ==
Raphael began her career as a general practitioner, working in Manly and Tasmania, before specialising in psychiatry. She worked as a research psychiatrist at the New South Wales Health Commission (1973–74) and then joined the University of Sydney as an associate professor in 1975. Her interest in bereavement led her to serve as the first president of the National Association for Loss and Grief (1975–78).

Raphael was the first woman professor of psychiatry in Australia when appointed to that role at the University of Newcastle in 1978. She moved to the University of Queensland as professor of psychiatry in 1987, before returning to Sydney as director of mental health for NSW in 1996. She returned to academia as professor of population health and disasters at Western Sydney University (2005–2015) and professor of psychiatry and addiction medicine at the Australian National University (2006–2017). On her retirement, she was appointed emeritus professor at both the University of Queensland and Western Sydney University.

She was president of the Royal Australian and New Zealand College of Psychiatrists (RANZCP) from 1983 to 1985.

In the aftermath of the Granville rail disaster in 1977, Raphael led the mental health follow up. She was skilled in alleviating stress and trauma following other disasters such as the Ash Wednesday bushfires (1983), the Newcastle earthquake (1989), the Bali bombings (2002) and the South East Asian tsunami (2004).

== Awards and recognition ==
In the 1984 Queens Birthday Honours, Raphael was appointed a Member of the Order of Australia for "service to medicine, particularly in the field of psychiatry". She was elected a Fellow of the Academy of the Social Sciences in Australia in 1986. In 1994 she was awarded a Top Ten Australian Achievers Australia Day award in recognition of her contribution to the field of mental health. She was awarded an honorary Doctor of Medicine by the University of Newcastle in 2002 and received a Lifetime Achievement Award from the International Society for Traumatic Stress Studies in 2004. A fellow of the RANZCP, she received their College Medal of Honour in 2008.

== Death and legacy ==
Raphael died on 29 September 2018.

The RANZCP has awarded the Beverley Raphael New Investigator Grant to support post-doctoral research since 2014. The Australian National University has administered the RANZCP Beverley Raphael Prize for Psychiatry, requiring 'Higher Level Performance' results in a Scientific Essay on Psychiatry, named in her honour and awarded to the "most outstanding final-year medical student in psychiatry".

== Selected works ==
- The anatomy of bereavement: a handbook for the caring professions (1983)
- When disaster strikes: how individuals and communities cope with disaster (1986)
