= Jack Hamilton (footballer, born 1928) =

Australian rules footballer (1928–1990)

- Hamilton with Collingwood in 1951

Personal information
- Full name: John Clifford Hamilton
- Born: 15 November 1928; Melbourne
- Died: 30 May 1990 (aged 61) near Whittlesea
- Original team: Ivanhoe Amateurs
- Height: 184 cm (6 ft 0 in)
- Weight: 87 kg (192 lb)
- Position: Full-back

Playing career^{1}
Years	Club	Games (Goals)
1948–1957	Collingwood	154 (16)
- ^{1} Playing statistics correct to the end of 1957.

Jack Hamilton AM (15 November 1928 – 30 May 1990) was an Australian rules football player in the Victorian Football League (VFL) before becoming a prominent administrator.

Hamilton was known as a tough full-back who played with Collingwood Football Club in the VFL (later to be renamed as the Australian Football League) from 1948 to 1957 for a career total of 154 games and 16 goals. He also represented Victoria in one game.

His administrative career spanned 29 years and included:

- VFL Assistant Secretary 1957–1967,
- VFL Manager Administration 1967–1977,
- General Manager 1977–1984,
- Chief Commissioner 1984–1986.

Hamilton was made a Member of the Order of Australia in the 1984 Queen's Birthday Honours for "service to the sport of Australian Football".

Hamilton died in a car accident while travelling home from a weekend in the country.

Hamilton was inducted to the Australian Football Hall of Fame in 1996.
