= The Hedberg =

Performance arts and teaching facility for the University of Tasmania

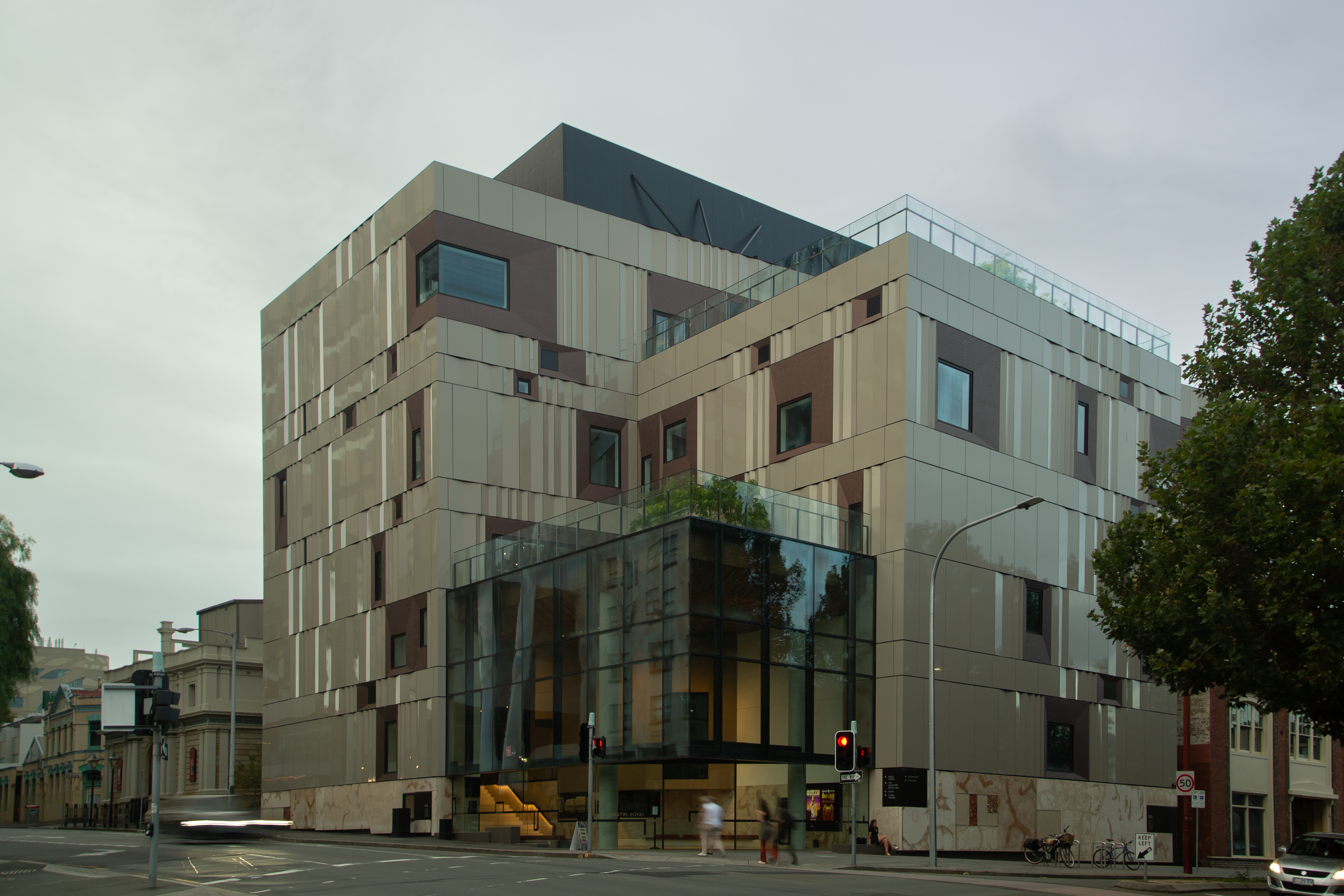
- Type: Public
- Established: 9 August 2021; 4 years ago
- Affiliations: University of Tasmania
- Vice-Chancellor: Rufus Black
- Location: Hobart, Tasmania, Australia; 42.879699°S 147.331447°E
- Nickname: The Hedberg
- Website: hedberg.com.au

The Hedberg is performing arts campus and teaching facility that encompasses the historic Theatre Royal and the University of Tasmania (UTAS) through a collaborative partnership which also included the Australian and Tasmanian Governments.

== History ==
UTAS acquired the 1926 Hedberg Brothers mechanics warehouse building and carpark on the corner of Campbell and Collins Streets, adjoining the Theatre Royal. In 2007, the Theatre Royal and UTAS approached the Tasmanian Government for funding a joint venture in the creation of a performance precinct. Hobart’s Liminal Architecture team, as principal consultant, designed the building in collaboration with Singaporean architectural firm WOHA commencing in 2013. Archaeological work was completed in 2018 with consultation from the Tasmanian Heritage Council.

Built at a cost of $110m, the six-storey Hedberg building was officially opened by the Minister for the Arts, the Hon Elise Archer MP on 9 August 2021.

== Facilities ==
Name	Use	Capacity	Notes
Claudio Alcorso Foyer	Social Space		A socialising space honouring Italian-born entrepreneur and environmentalist Claudio Alcorso, who aided the development of the Tasmanian Centre for the Arts at Sullivans Cove.
Vanessa Goodwin City Room	Creative Space		Rooftop terrace providing spaces for creative collaboration and small-scale corporate events. Named for Vanessa Goodwin, the former Attorney-General of Tasmania and UTAS alumni.
Ian Potter Recital Hall	Auditorium	289 seats	Acknowledges Australian philanthropist Ian Potter. Hosts a 289 seat auditorium, specifically tuned sonic and equipped with live-streaming technology for a wide range of performances.
The Salon	Auditorium	150 seats	The Salon is a performing space and recording studio constructed within the original Hedberg garage.
Theatre Royal	Auditorium	698 seats	The original 1837 Theatre Royal auditorium.
Studio Theatre	Black box Theatre	300 seats	Built within the Hedberg.

== Awards ==
Tasmanian Architecture Awards

- Tasmanian Architecture Medal (2022)
- Alan C Walker Award for Public Architecture (2022)
- Dirk Bolt Award for Urban Design (2022)
- Roy Sharrington Smith Award for Heritage (2022)
- COLORBOND Award for Steel Architecture (2022)
- Alexander North Award for Interior Architecture (2022)

== See also ==
- List of theatres in Hobart
