= Claudio Alcorso =

Italian-Australian businessman and arts patron (1913-2000)

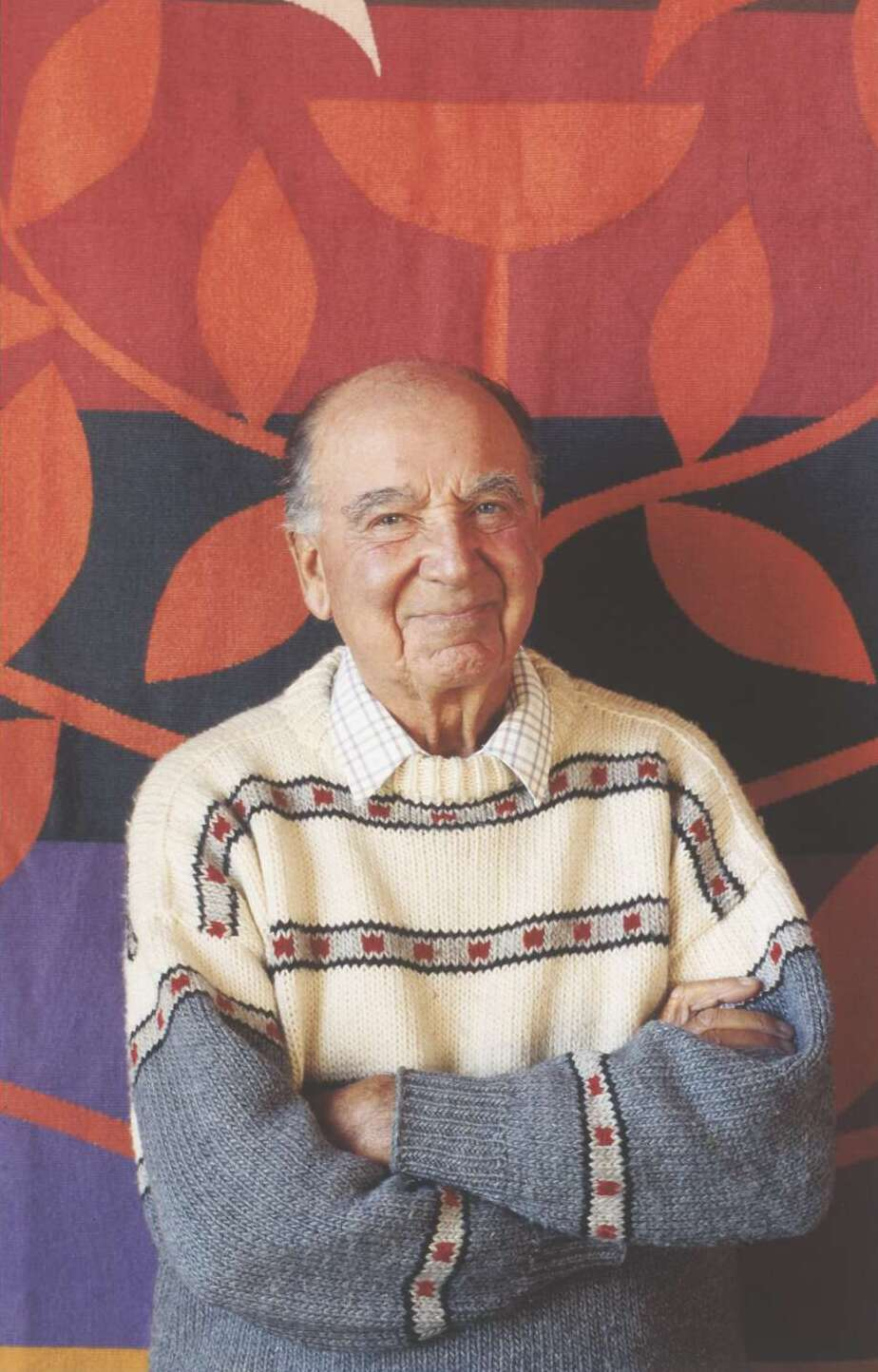
- Claudio Alcorso at Moorilla Estate, c. 1995.
- Born: 5 October 1913; Rome, Italy
- Died: 28 August 2000 (aged 87); Hobart, Tasmania, Australia
- Education: University of Milan
- Occupations: Entrepreneur, businessman, textile manufacturer, winemaker
- Known for: Founder of Sheridan and Moorilla Estate

Claudio Alcorso (5 October 1913 – 28 August 2000) was an Italian-Australian entrepreneur, textile manufacturer, and arts patron. Brought to Australia as an Italian prisoner of war during World War II, he later settled in the country. He founded the home furnishings brand Sheridan and Moorilla Estate, a winery established in 1958 in Hobart.

Alcorso was a patron of the arts, serving as foundation chair of the Australian Opera, a board member of the Australian Ballet, and a member of the executive committee of the Australian Elizabethan Theatre Trust. He also supported workers' rights and environmental conservation.

His autobiography, The Wind You Say (1993), recounts his business career and personal life.

== Early life ==
Claudio Alcorso was born in Rome, Italy, on 5 October 1913, the eldest son of Amilcare and Delia Coen. His younger brother, Orlando, was born in 1916. Alcorso studied economics at the University of Milan, graduating in 1935. Holding a civil aviation pilot licence, he qualified as a fighter pilot later that year and undertook his national service in the Royal Italian Air Force. His brother, Orlando, did not complete high school but eventually became a navigator and later a pilot in the Italian Air Force.

After his studies, Alcorso moved to England, where he attended Oxford University. With the outbreak of World War II, as an Italian citizen in England, he was interned as an enemy alien and later deported to Australia, where he was placed in a prison camp in New South Wales. He became an Australian citizen in October 1947.

== Business career ==
=== Silk & Textile Printers and Sheridan ===
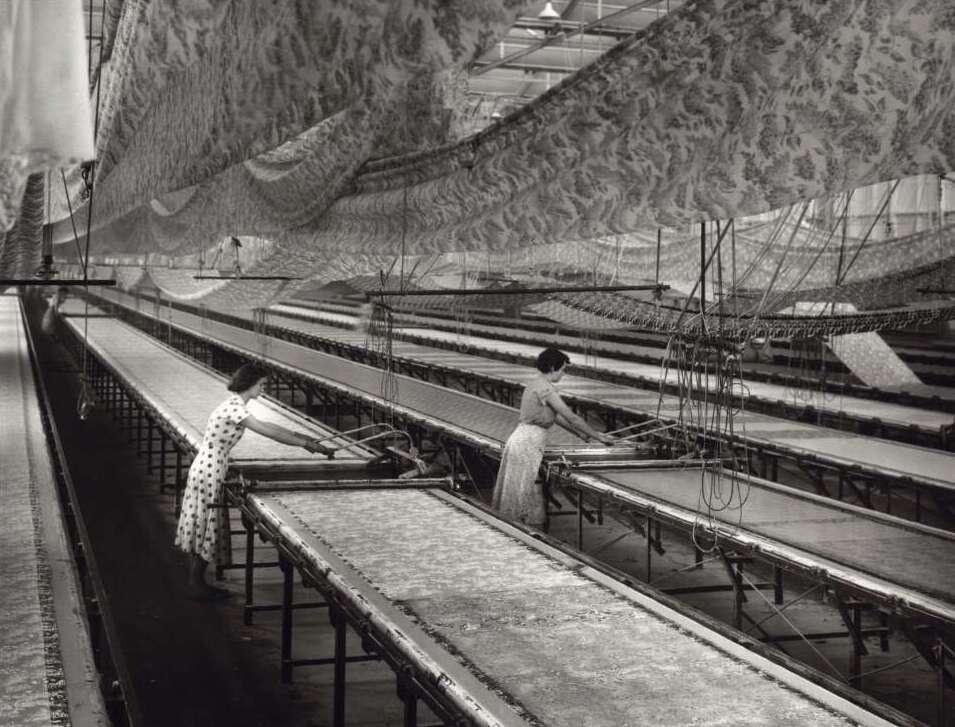
Factory at Derwent Park, c. 1954

In 1939, Alcorso co-founded Silk & Textile Printers Pty Ltd in Sydney, alongside Orlando Alcorso and Paul Sonnino. The company initially operated in Rushcutters Bay, producing high-quality printed textiles.

After World War II, seeking expansion opportunities, Alcorso moved the business to Tasmania in 1947, encouraged by Robert Cosgrove's offer of cheap hydroelectric power. The company established a factory in Derwent Park, Hobart, which became a major textile manufacturing hub. It employed up to 1,400 workers and introduced progressive workplace policies, including worker representation in the boardroom, a 40-hour workweek, and a profit-sharing system.

In 1967, Alcorso launched the Sheridan brand, which became a globally recognised name in luxury home textiles. He remained involved in the brand's design and innovation until 1970, when he sold the company to Dunlop.

=== Wine industry ===
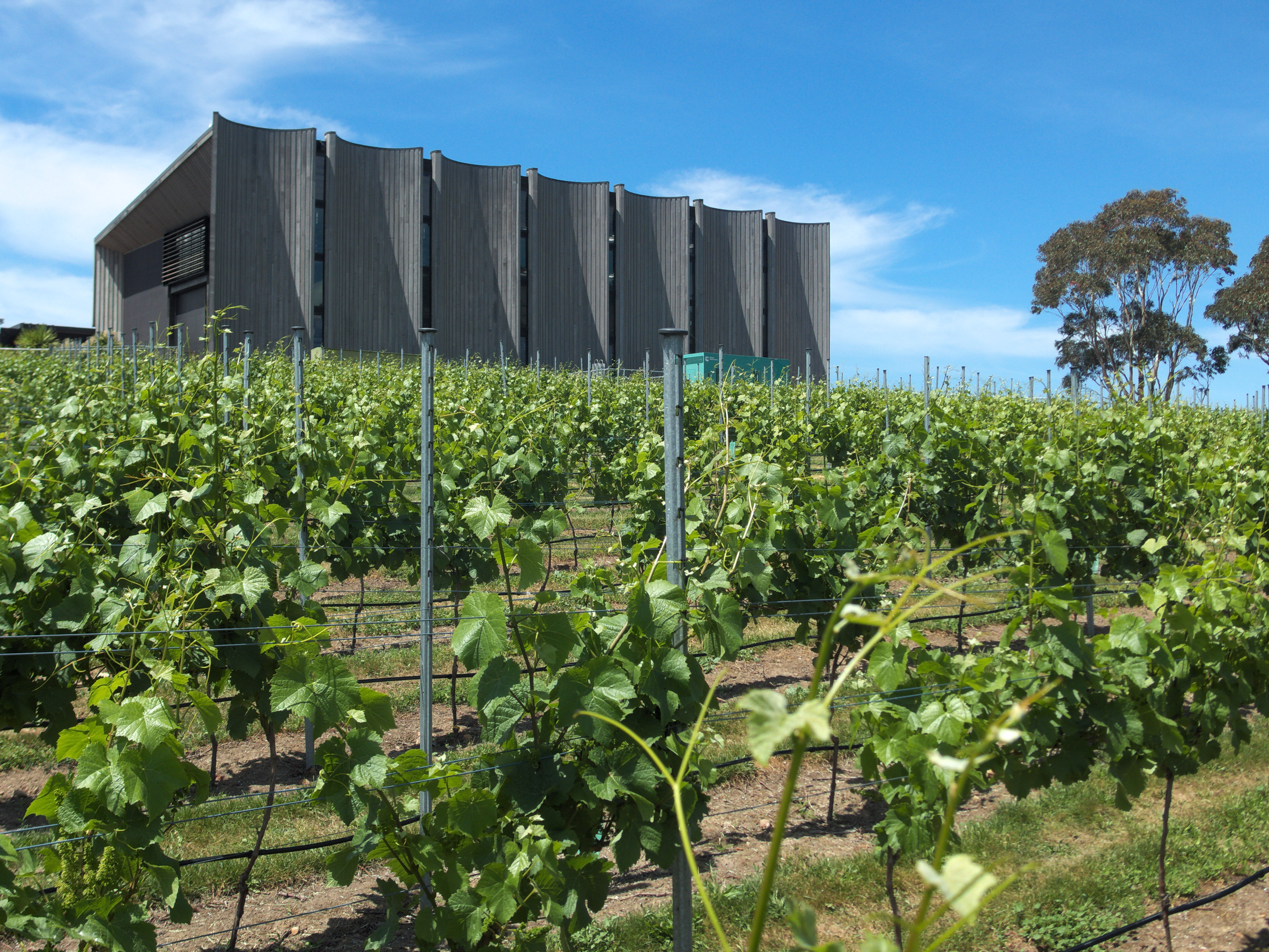
Moorilla Estate vineyard in 2017

Following his departure from Sheridan, Alcorso turned his attention entirely to winemaking. The Moorilla vineyard at Berriedale, north of Hobart, was planted in 1958, and by 1973 it had developed into the Moorilla Estate, one of Tasmania's first modern vineyards. His pioneering efforts helped lay the foundation for Tasmania's wine industry, which has since become world-renowned for its cool-climate wines.

Alcorso led Moorilla Estate for more than thirty years, expanding its operations in 1993 with the acquisition of the St Matthias Vineyard near Launceston. However, the winery soon faced financial difficulties. In 1995, the business was purchased by David Walsh, an Australian entrepreneur, gambler, and art collector, who later transformed the Berriedale location into what would become the Museum of Old & New Art).

== Arts, advocacy, and legacy ==
Alcorso was actively involved in Australia's cultural and social landscape. He served as chairman of the Australian Opera and contributed to public art initiatives and cultural events. He also played a role in the development of the Tasmanian Centre for the Arts at Sullivans Cove, and a social space at The Hedberg, a University of Tasmania performing arts campus, is named in his honour.

Beyond the arts, Alcorso was an advocate for workers' rights and environmental conservation. He was a vocal opponent of the Franklin Dam project in Tasmania during the 1980s and promoted sustainable industry practices.

He was appointed a Member of the Order of Australia in the 1984 Queen's Birthday Honours for his "services to the arts, education and to ethnic welfare".

Alcorso died in Hobart on 28 August 2000.
