= Sheridan (brand) =

Australian homewares brand

- Type: Subsidiary
- Industry: Homewares, Textiles
- Predecessor: Silk & Textile Printers
- Founded: 1967; 59 years ago in Derwent Park, Tasmania, Australia
- Founder: Claudio Alcorso
- Area served: Australia, New Zealand, United Kingdom
- Products: Bed linen, Towels, Homewares
- Parent: Hanes Australasia
- Website: www.sheridan.com.au

Sheridan is an Australian textile brand known for its premium homewares, particularly bed linen and towels. Established in 1967 by entrepreneur Claudio Alcorso, the brand has become synonymous with high-quality fabrics and Australian design. Sheridan is a subsidiary of Hanes Australasia.

== History ==
=== Origins: Silk & Textile Printers ===
Sheridan traces its origins to the establishment of Silk & Textile Printers Pty Ltd in 1939. Founded in Sydney by Orlando and Claudio Alcorso, along with Paul Sonnino, the company initially operated from a factory in Rushcutters Bay. By June 1940, the first printed materials were delivered to customers.

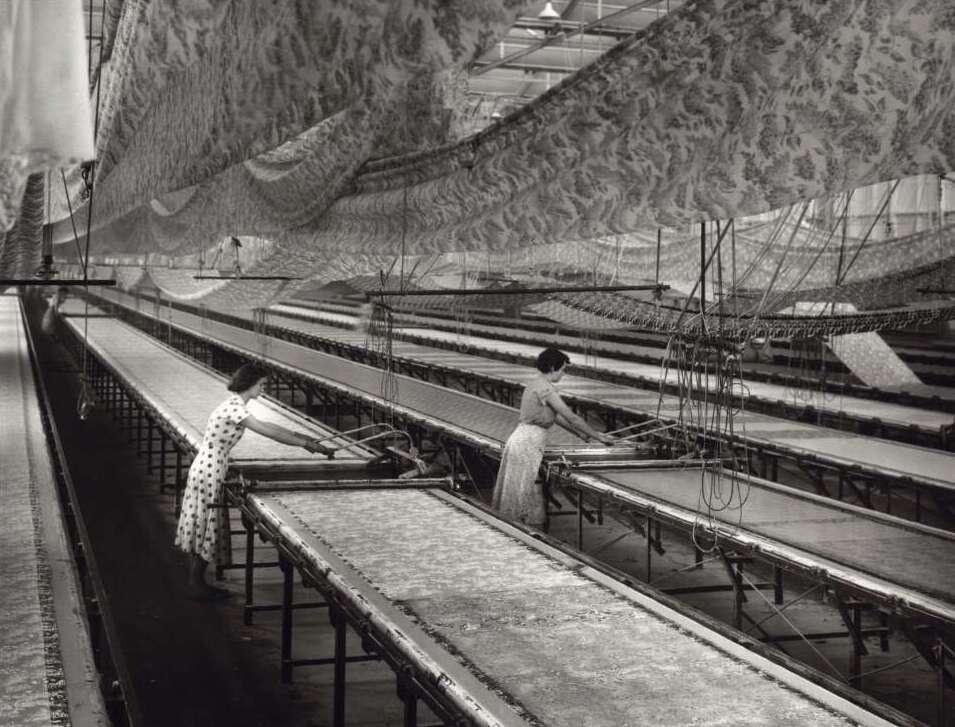
Factory at Derwent Park, c. 1954

Following World War II, the company sought expansion opportunities and relocated its manufacturing operations to Tasmania in 1947. The Tasmanian Government, under Robert Cosgrove, offered incentives such as affordable electricity to attract industries. The company established its new production facility in a repurposed munitions factory at Derwent Park, while maintaining its registered office in Sydney. Initially focused on screen-printing raw silk, the factory gradually incorporated other textiles such as cotton. By the mid-1950s, the company had expanded its operations to include spinning and weaving, allowing it to complete the textile manufacturing cycle. A 1954 photograph of the factory by Wolfgang Sievers further suggests that these activities were already part of the production process at that time.

=== The birth of Sheridan ===
In 1967, Claudio Alcorso established the Sheridan brand, leveraging his expertise in textiles to develop a premium homewares company centred on high-quality fabrics and innovative designs. The existing Derwent Park factory remained central to Sheridan's manufacturing, employing approximately 1,400 workers at its peak. The facility was notable for its progressive workplace policies, including worker representation in the boardroom, a 40-hour workweek, and a profit-sharing system.

=== Expansion and dominance ===
Sheridan established itself as a prominent player in the home textiles industry, maintaining a significant presence both domestically and internationally. By 1994, the brand's products were sold in 43 countries, making it the only global brand operating in the bed-linen industry.

As part of its marketing strategy in the 1990s and 2000s, Sheridan introduced the "Come Home to Sheridan" magazine. The publication showcased the brand's products in lavish lifestyle settings and featured prominent brand ambassadors, including Elle Macpherson.

==== Downsizing and departure from Tasmania ====
Following management changes between 1995 and 1996, Sheridan began downsizing its Australian manufacturing operations. Initial redundancies targeted the factory's cutting and sewing division (known as "Makeup"), leading to the immediate layoff of approximately 100 to 150 workers. Departmental management was subsequently consolidated, with remaining managers assuming dual roles.

Under the revised operational structure, fabric was printed, fixed, inspected, and rolled in Tasmania before being shipped overseas for final assembly. Following unfulfilled union negotiations, further redundancies were issued on 22 November 1996, reducing the workforce to a skeleton crew. In 2002, Sheridan permanently ceased all Tasmanian operations, resulting in the loss of the final 48 jobs and ending 55 years of manufacturing presence in the state.

=== Brand revivals and anniversaries ===
In 2018, Sheridan marked its 50th anniversary by partnering with Australian artist and designer Ken Done, who reimagined his iconic 1980s collaboration with the brand through a contemporary textile collection.

== Mergers ==
Over the years, Sheridan underwent various mergers, eventually becoming part of Universal Textiles, which was later acquired by Dunlop. In 2005, Sheridan was acquired by Pacific Brands. This acquisition allowed Sheridan to expand its market presence and product offerings. In 2016, Hanesbrands acquired Pacific Brands, bringing Sheridan under its global portfolio.

== Legacy ==
Sheridan's legacy is built on a foundation of quality craftsmanship and innovative design. From its origins in silk and textile printing to its evolution into a leading home lifestyle brand, Sheridan has played a significant role in shaping Australia's textile industry.
