= Theatre Royal, Hobart =

Historic theatre in Hobart, Tasmania

Theatre Royal
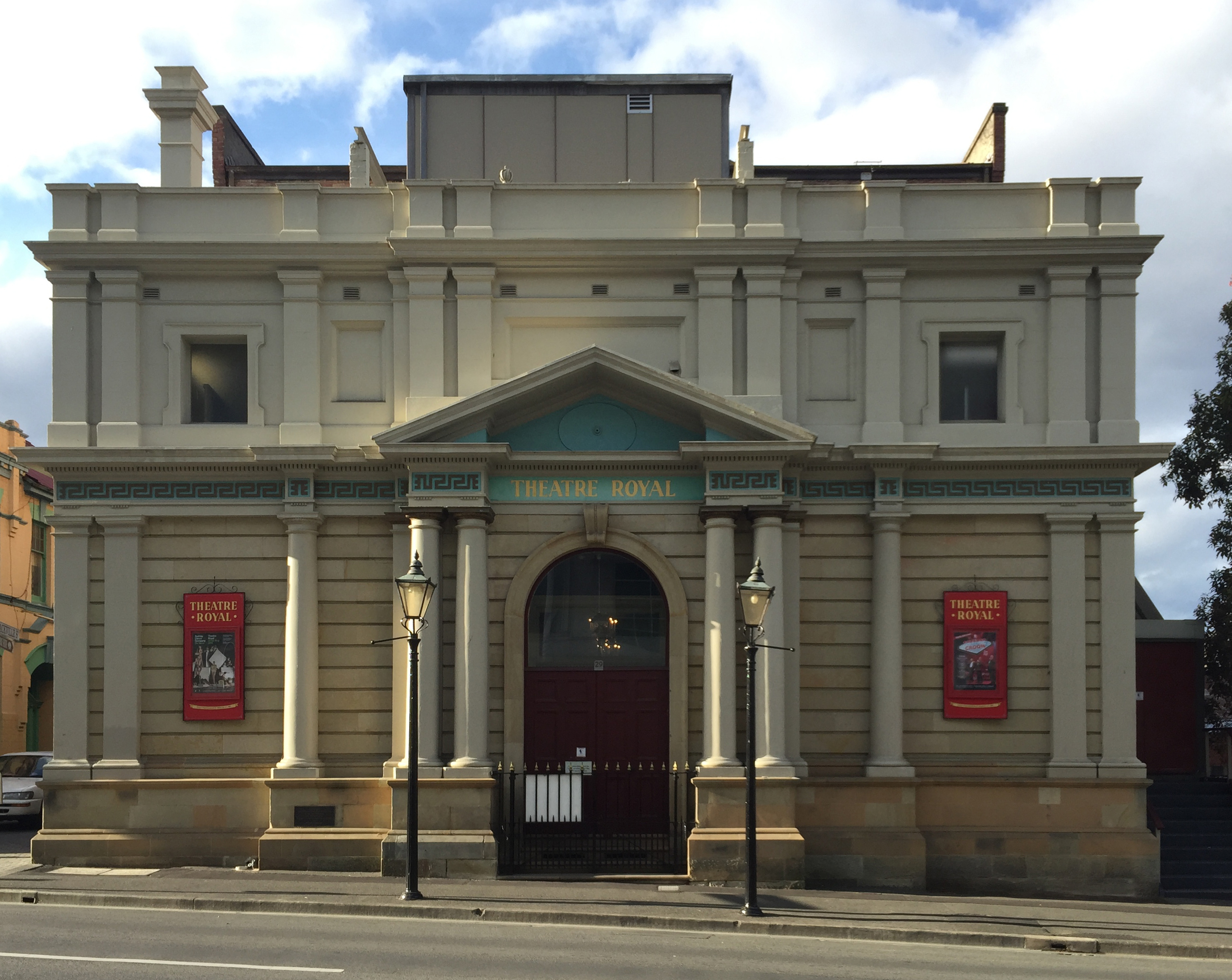
- The Theatre Royal exterior in 2015
- Interactive map of Theatre Royal
- Address: 29 Campbell Street, Hobart 7000; Hobart, Tasmania; Australia
- Coordinates: 42.8796°S 147.3311°E
- Owner: Theatre Royal Management Board
- Capacity: 698
- Designation: Listed building
- Production: Ballet, opera, drama, repertory

Construction
- Opened: 1837; 189 years ago
- Rebuilt: 1837, 1850s, 1890s, 1986
- Years active: 1834–1984; 1986 – present
- Architect: John Lee Archer

Website
- www.theatreroyal.com.au

Tasmanian Heritage Register
- Place ID: 2,191
- Status: Permanently Registered

Theatre Royal is an historic performing arts venue in central Hobart, Tasmania. It is the oldest continually operating theatre in Australia; Noël Coward once called it "a dream of a theatre" and Laurence Olivier launched a national appeal for its reconstruction in the 1940s.

== History ==
=== 1834–1856, Construction and early years ===
In 1834, Peter Degraves, founder of Cascade Brewery, and a group of Hobart citizens purchased dock-side land for the purpose of building a public theatre. Architect John Lee Archer created a provincial Georgian design and the first stone was laid that year. The location was not ideal for future gentry audiences; it was in a rough and foul-smelling area near an abattoir, brothels, factories, and pubs. The architect accommodated the local population by creating an entrance through a neighbouring pub directly into the theatre's pit seating, colloquially known as "the Shades." When a national economic downturn caused most of the original investors to pull out, Degraves stepped in and took complete ownership.

The building was completed, using convict labor in part, by the end of 1836. It staged its inaugural performances in March 1837; Thomas Morton's Speed the Plough and the W. Oxberry's The Spoiled Child. In June, the theatre was formally named the "Royal Victoria Theatre" in honor of the coronation of the Queen of the United Kingdom but it became known simply as "The Theatre Royal."

During the period of Anne Clarke's tenure as manager (1840-1847), the theatre became renowned as a pioneer theatre institution in Australia for its high quality and Clarke was credited by the press with introducing 'a better class of performer and a superior style of management' and for giving theatre, which was then regarded as somewhat dubious, a better name.

=== 1856–1911, Cockfights etc ===
Due to the neighbourhood, early performances tended towards cockfights, boxing, and religious meetings. The patrons of the Shades included visiting seamen and workers from the convict-laden Wapping area surrounding the theatre. They became known for their drunken and disruptive interactions with performers. Degraves undertook a major renovation in 1856 but it did not improve bookings or offerings. Following Degraves' death in 1883, Richard Lewis purchased the theatre for £3222. For the next 40 years or so, Lewis made improvements to further attempt to upgrade the theatre's fashion. In 1911 the interior was completely rebuilt, creating the Louis Quatorze style auditorium there today. Designed by William Pitt from Melbourne, who specialised in theatres, the Shades was replaced with raked stalls seating, and a higher and steeper balcony was built above. The decoration featured red velvet upholstery, gilded highlights, and a crystal chandelier in a domed ceiling.

=== 1911–1952, Decline and first major renovation ===
Despite continued attempts at maintaining the theatre, it declined over the next three decades. By the 1940s, the performers had to beware of holes in the stage, unsafe wiring, faulty heating, and cockroaches. Unsafe conditions eventually led to a planned demolition. In 1948, Sir Laurence Olivier arrived in Hobart as part of the Old Vic touring company and spoke passionately about the theatre, launching a national appeal;

"We appreciate playing in it not only because it is a beautiful little theatre; it is more than that. Your parents and grandparents have sat here as audience. Our parents have acted on this stage. In the one hundred and eleven years it has been played in it has built up atmosphere and the secret of atmosphere is antiquity. Don’t let it go."

His speech was effective. The state government purchased the theatre for £12,000 with the promise of restoration if matching funds were raised. An ambitious public campaign followed and by 1952, the renovations were completed. 'Royal boxes' had been installed specifically for an anticipated visit from then-Princess Elizabeth. King George's death curtailed the planned audience but the theatre re-opened on schedule. The updates were a success; the theatre was booked with frequent productions and became home to a new resident company.

=== 1952–1986, Expansion and fire ===
The theatre enjoyed several successful decades marked with periodic structural updates. In the early 1980s, a A$1 million-dollar refurbishment was launched in honour of the theatre's 150-year anniversary. In addition to restoring much of the 1911 decorations, the backstage facilities were modernized and reconfigured to become the Backspace Theatre, a venue for cabaret and smaller local companies. The work was almost complete when, on 18 June 1984, a fire began backstage and spread to the main auditorium. In addition to structural damage to the roof, the water and smoke damage was extensive but was somewhat contained by a fire curtain that somewhat inexplicably fell across the stage. Most of the furniture, decoration, and technical equipment was damaged; only one painting survived. 'Australia's grand old lady of the theatre world' was quickly launched back into reconstruction, covered by a public fundraising appeal, adequate insurance and the State Government's assurance. However, it would take several years for the theatre to re-open.

=== 1986–Current ===
The theatre completed its major refurbishment and reopened in March 1986. It re-established itself as a centre of Hobart's social life, thanks in part to government policies encouraging national touring of popular theatre shows. It presents an annual program that features live theatre, contemporary music, dance and entertainment. Since 1994, it has offered a subscription season and has seen both the number of performances and overall attendances increase steadily. The theatre has incorporated modern technology with the computerisation of the lighting control system and the installation of a computerised ticketing system.

From 2018 to 2021, the theatre was combined with The Hedberg performing arts centre, including a new studio theatre (replacing the Backspace Theatre).

== Fred the Ghost ==
The theatre's mascot is a resident ghost of a former actor who was allegedly killed during a fight in the basement. Known as "Fred", the theatre used the ghost for the first time in the 1984 restoration appeal.

== See also ==
- List of theatres in Hobart
