= Moorilla Estate =

Historic winery and vineyard in Tasmania

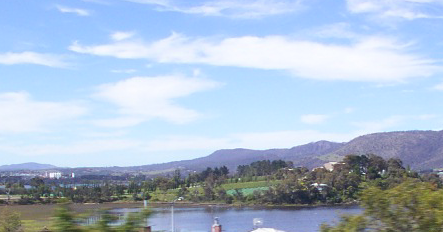
- Location: Berriedale, Hobart, Tasmania, Australia
- Coordinates: 42°48′43″S 147°15′39″E
- Founded: 1958
- Key people: Claudio Alcorso, David Walsh
- Known for: Cloth Label, Estate Range, Black Label, St Matthius
- Varietals: Gewürztraminer, Pinot gris, Chardonnay, Riesling, Pinot noir, Brut (wine), Sauvignon blanc, Cabernet Sauvignon, Merlot
- Other products: Moo Brew
- Other attractions: Museum of Old and New Art (MONA), The Ether building, The Source Restaurant, Mona Pavilions (accommodation)
- Website: http://www.moorilla.com.au

Moorilla Estate is a winery located in the suburb of Berriedale, 12 km north of the city centre of Hobart, in Tasmania.

== Establishment ==
It was established in 1958 by Italian-Australian former textile merchant Claudio Alcorso.

Moorilla Estate is currently owned by David Walsh, and is the site of the Museum of Old and New Art (MONA).

The winery produces a number of cool climate wines, and also produces five beers under the label Moo Brew.

== Moo Brew ==
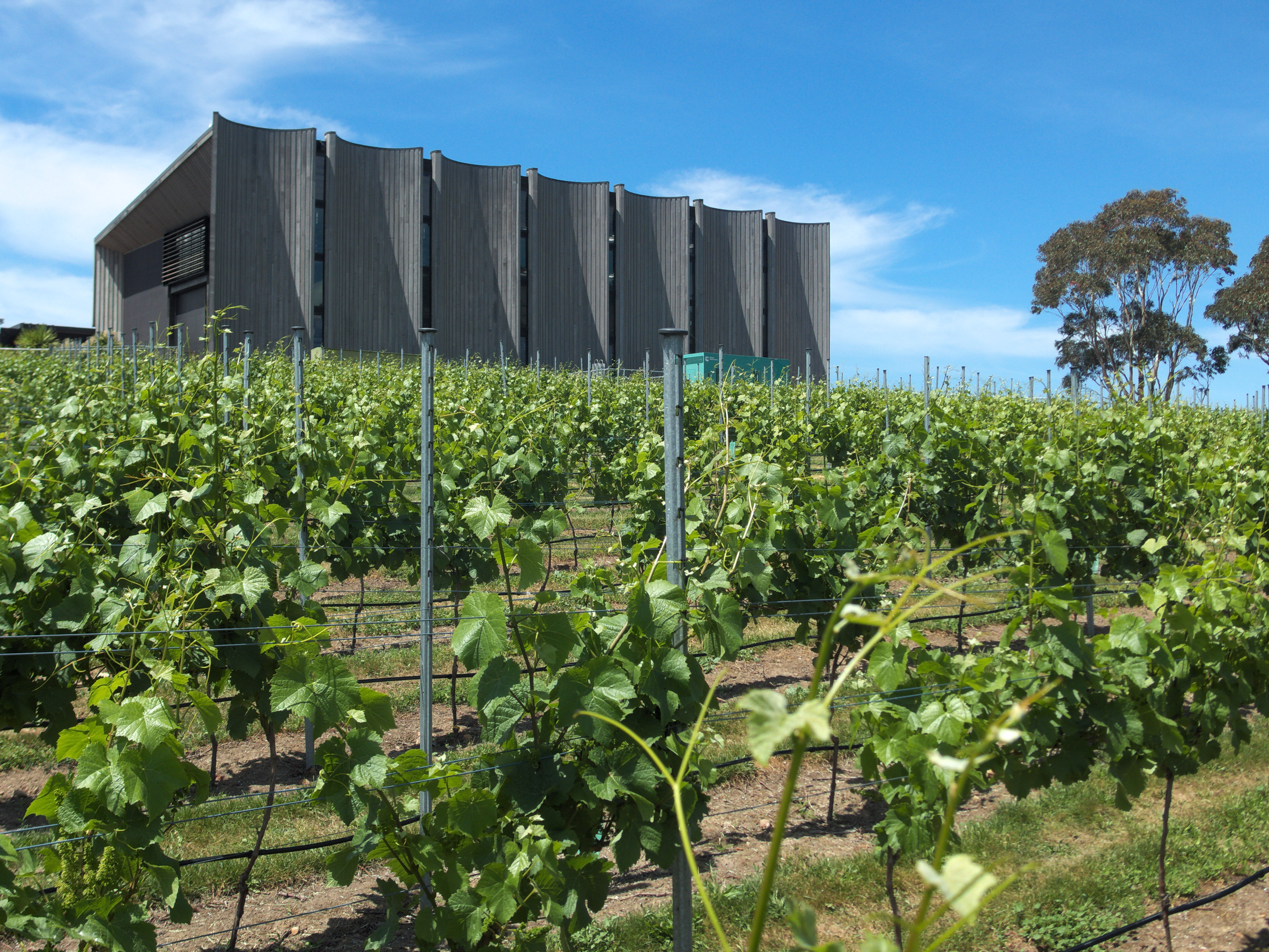
Moorilla in 2017

In November 2004 a micro-brewery was installed at Moorilla Estate, under the guidance of head brewer, Owen Johnston. In June 2005 the first keg was sold and went on tap at T42° on Hobart’s waterfront, with the brewery officially launching on 11 November 2005. In 2010 Moo Brew expanded and opened a second brewery in Bridgewater, Tasmania. All brewing is now carried out at this secondary site. Moo Brew produce five core beers (each featuring exclusive artwork by Australian artist John Kelly):

- a Pilsner;
- a German-style Hefeweizen;
- a Belgian Pale Ale;
- an American Pale Ale; and
- an American Dark Ale.

They also produce a number of seasonal beers, including:

- a Harvest Ale;
- a seasonal Stout; and
- a farmhouse style Saison.

== Accommodation ==
Accommodation was added in 2000 and consisting of four hilltop chalets which feature items from the Museum of Old and New Art. Four further pavilions were opened in 2009.

== Performances ==
The site also plays host to a number of live music and drama performances on a regular basis, and has a function centre.

== See also ==
- Tasmanian beer
- Tasmanian wine
- Australian pub
- Beer in Australia
- List of breweries in Australia
