= Milton Moon =

Australian potter (1926–2019)

Milton Moon AM (29 October 1926 - 6 September 2019) was an Australian potter. He studied in many countries, as a recipient of a Foundation Winston Churchill Fellowship and also as a Myer Foundation Geijutsu Fellow.

== Early years ==
Milton Moon was born in Melbourne in 1926. After discharge from Navy Service in 1947 he lived first in Queensland and then in New South Wales until 1949, at which time he returned to Brisbane. He studied painting and drawing at the Central Technical College and then privately with Margaret Cilento from 1949 to 1951.

He first became interested in pottery in 1950 and was taught wheel-throwing by Mervyn Feeney, a traditional potter living in Brisbane. He was also employed in broadcasting and later television from 1947 to 1962.

== Career ==
In 1962 he became Senior Pottery Instructor with the Department of Technical Education, Brisbane.

In 1965 Moon was awarded a Foundation Churchill Fellowship and studied in many countries during the following year. He represented Australia at the first World Craft Congress, Montreux, Switzerland, in 1966. In 1967-68, he was an art tutor at the Architecture Department, University of Queensland. In 1969 became Senior Lecturer, Head of Ceramics at the South Australian School of Art. In 1974, as a Myer Foundation Geijutsu Fellow, he lived and worked in Japan.

In 1975 he resigned from lecturing to work full-time at Summertown, South Australia in the Adelaide Hills where he and his wife established a workshop, home and gallery in a restored 1850s stone mill. Twenty years later, in 1995, he relocated to Adelaide.

Moon served as a member of the Australia-Japan Foundation from 1976 to 1981. He was made a Member of the Order of Australia (AM) in the 1984 Queen's Birthday Honours.

In 1990 Moon was awarded Life Membership of the South Australian Crafts Council and, in 1992, he was a recipient of an Advance Australia Foundation Award. In 1991 he was accorded a retrospective of his work, covering a period of thirty-five years, at the Art Gallery of South Australia. In 1993 was a recipient of an Australian Artists Creative Fellowship, for a five-year period from 1994 to 1998. In 2006 he was conferred an honorary doctorate (DUniv) from the University of South Australia.

"In this, my 'ninetieth year,' over sixty of which I have been a potter, I remain concerned, if a little obsessed, with the challenge of making pots, which although belonging to a ceramic tradition of some eight thousand years or more, are undeniably and uniquely Australian. With all my changes of expression this has remained constant."
