= Berriedale, Tasmania =

Berriedale
- Suburb
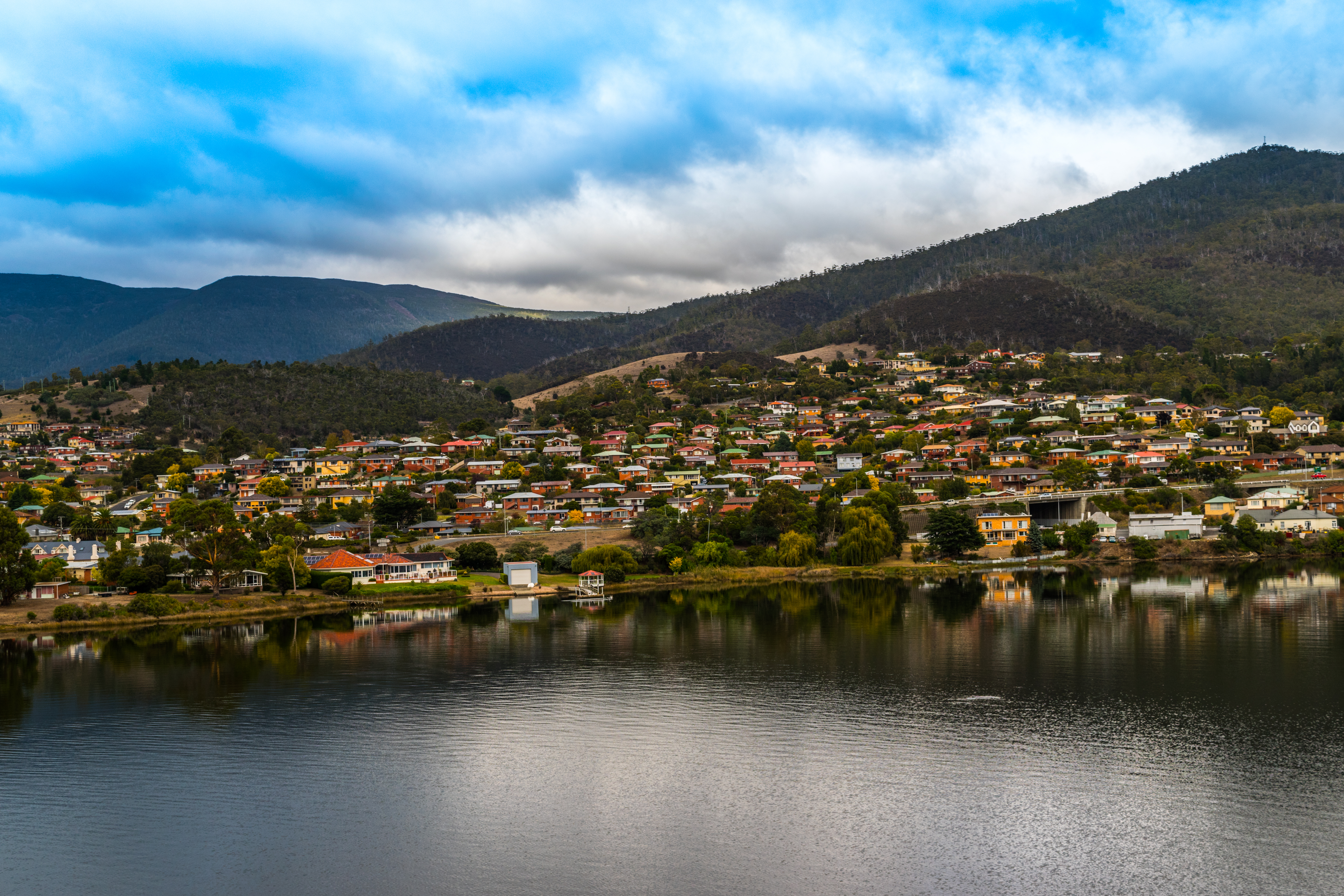
- View of Berriedale from MONA

- Interactive map of Berriedale
- Coordinates: 42°48′35″S 147°15′17″E
- Country: Australia
- State: Tasmania
- City: Hobart
- LGA: City of Glenorchy

Population
  - Total: 2,905 (2021 census)
- Postcode: 7011
Suburbs around Berriedale
| Claremont | Chigwell | River Derwent |
| Chigwell | Berriedale | River Derwent |
| Rosetta | Rosetta | River Derwent |

Berriedale /ˈbɛrideɪl/ BERR-ee-dayl is a residential suburb located in the northern part of Hobart, the capital city of Tasmania, Australia. Situated within the City of Glenorchy, it lies between the suburbs of Chigwell and Rosetta, approximately 15 km (9.3 mi) from Hobart's city centre. The suburb is most well-known for being home to the internationally acclaimed Museum of Old and New Art (MONA), which, along with the adjacent Moorilla Estate winery, has become a major cultural and tourist destination for Tasmania.

Historically, Berriedale served as a hub for travellers in the 19th century. Established in 1834, the Berriedale Inn acted as a key social venue and an important landmark for the local community. The inn is believed to have given the suburb its name.

Berriedale's residential architecture primarily consists of mid-20th-century homes, reflecting Tasmania's post-World War II housing boom. These homes typically feature weatherboard or brick construction and single-story layouts, designed with spacious yards and gardens that characterise suburban development from that era. In recent decades, the suburb has undergone significant cultural transformation, with MONA emerging as its defining feature and enhancing Berriedale's prominence both locally and internationally.

== Geography ==
Berriedale is situated on the banks of the River Derwent, offering scenic water views. The Brooker Highway, one of Hobart's major arterial roads, bisects the suburb, creating informal designations of "East Berriedale" and "West Berriedale." The eastern portion of the suburb follows the river, while the western side extends towards the rural hinterland.

== History ==
Berriedale, located approximately 15 km (9.3 mi) north of Hobart, has a long history as a small settlement. The origin of the suburb's name is unclear, but the Berriedale Inn, opened in 1834, played a central role in its development. The Inn's first licensee was William Wilson, and it became a focal point for the community, situated at the junction of Main and Berriedale Roads. This area was historically a route to Bismark (Collinsvale) and Sorell Creek.

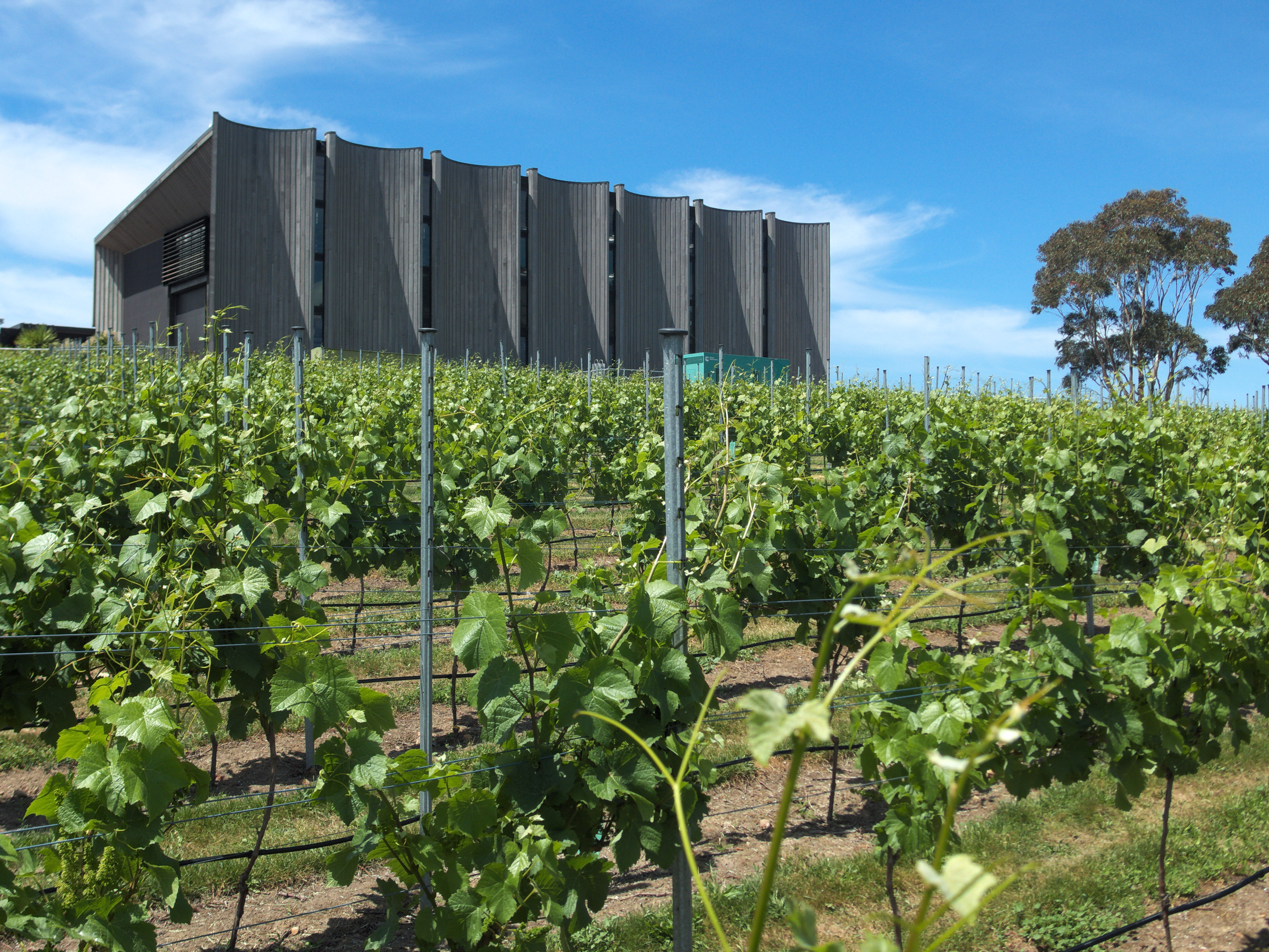
Moorilla vineyard c. 2017

The Moorilla Estate, was established in 1947 by Italian immigrant Claudio Alcorso. Alcorso transformed the site into a winery, planting vineyards and constructing an Italian-style farmhouse in 1954. The estate became a cultural hub for the arts, with Alcorso's patronage supporting local artists and musicians. Architect Roy Grounds designed the Courtyard House and Round House in the mid-1950s, reflecting modernist architectural principles.

In 1995, the estate was purchased by David Walsh, who expanded the site into the internationally renowned MONA, which opened in 2011. The museum is a striking architectural complex featuring subterranean galleries, a landscaped forecourt, and panoramic views of the River Derwent, kunanyi / Mount Wellington, and surrounding bays. MONA has since become a significant cultural and economic driver for the region, hosting annual festivals such as Dark Mofo.

Berriedale is also noted for hosting the finish line for Tasmania's historic amateur long-distance cycling race, the Campbell Town to Berriedale Race, a significant sporting event in the 1920s.

== Demographics ==
Historical population
| Year | Pop. | ±% |
|---|---|---|
| 2001 | 2,100 | — |
| 2006 | 2,250 | +7.1% |
| 2011 | 2,350 | +4.4% |
| 2016 | 2,692 | +14.6% |
| 2021 | 2,905 | +7.9% |
Source: Australian Bureau of Statistics data.

In 2021, the population of Berriedale was 2,905. External estimates place the 2023 population at around 3,000, with a population density of approximately 1,228.6 people per square kilometre across a land area of 2.2 km^{2} (0.85 sq mi).

The median weekly household income is lower than the national average, reflecting Berriedale's suburban character. Approximately 5.2% of residents identify as Indigenous Australians, above the national average of 3.8%. The majority (80.0%) of residents were born in Australia, while 83.8% speak only English at home.

In terms of religion, 43.2% reported having no religion, followed by 18.2% identifying as Anglican, and 16.8% as Catholic.

== Infrastructure ==
=== Roads and transport ===
Berriedale is bisected by the Brooker Highway, connecting northern Hobart to the city centre and the northern regions of Tasmania, including Bridgewater and Brighton. Public transport is provided by Metro Tasmania, with regular bus services running along the highway to nearby suburbs such as Glenorchy, Claremont, and Hobart. The suburb's proximity to major arterial roads like the Lyell Highway and Midland Highway makes it a convenient location for commuters. The suburb was served by passenger trains along the Main Line until suburban rail services in Hobart ceased in 1974.

=== Education ===
While there are no schools within Berriedale itself, several educational institutions are located nearby, including Claremont College for years 11 and 12, Montrose Bay High School in Rosetta, and primary schools in Claremont and Rosetta. These schools are easily accessible by public transport or car via the Brooker Highway.

=== Health services ===
Healthcare services for Berriedale residents are primarily located in nearby Glenorchy, where the Glenorchy Health Centre offers general medical services. For more comprehensive medical care, the Royal Hobart Hospital, Tasmania's largest public hospital, is about 12 kilometres (7.5 mi) away. Private healthcare options are available at Calvary Healthcare Tasmania in Lenah Valley.

=== Utilities ===
Essential services such as water supply, waste management, and sewerage are managed by TasWater, while electricity is supplied by TasNetworks, drawing from Tasmania's renewable energy sources. Most residents have access to high-speed internet via the National Broadband Network (NBN), with fibre-to-the-node (FTTN) and fibre-to-the-premises (FTTP) connections.

=== Recreation and cultural facilities ===
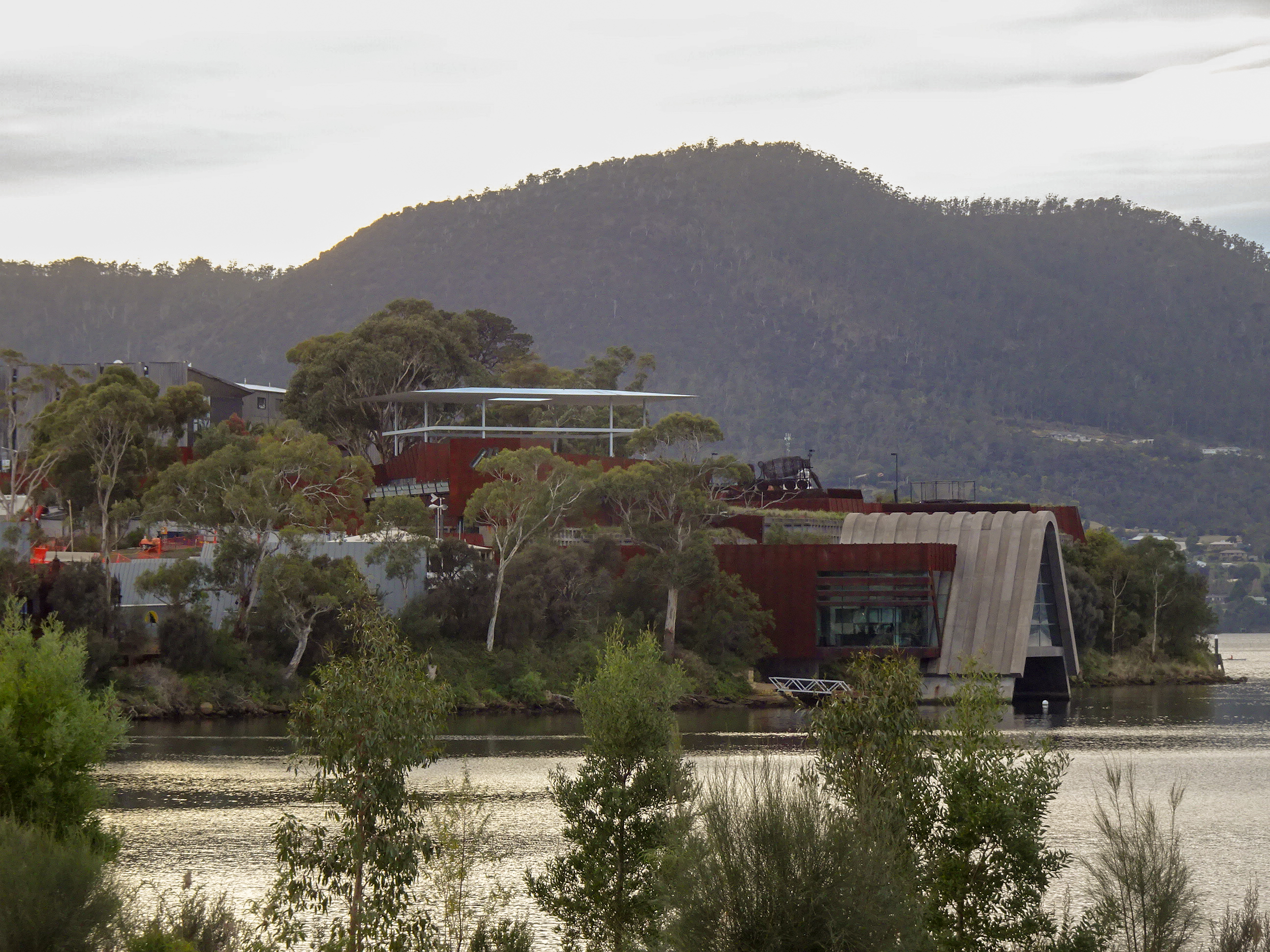
MONA, c. 2023

Berriedale is home to the Museum of Old and New Art (MONA), one of Tasmania's key cultural institutions. MONA hosts rotating exhibitions, live events, and the Dark Mofo festival, which attracts visitors from across Australia. The suburb also offers recreational green spaces such as Alroy Court Reserve, Chandos Drive Reserve, and the International Peace Forest, located along the River Derwent.

The suburb also holds historical significance as the finish line for Tasmania's amateur long-distance cycling race, the Campbell Town to Berriedale Race, in the 1920s.

=== Future developments ===
Ongoing development spurred by the popularity of MONA includes infrastructure upgrades to enhance connectivity and improve public spaces. Nearby urban renewal projects on the Claremont Peninsula are expected to provide better services and transport links for Berriedale residents.
