= Rose Bay, Tasmania =

Rose Bay
- Suburb
- Interactive map of Rose Bay
- Coordinates: 42°51′23″S 147°21′19″E
- Country: Australia
- State: Tasmania
- City: Hobart
- LGA: City of Clarence

Population
  - Total: 1,102 (2016 census)
- Postcode: 7015
Suburbs around Rose Bay
River Derwent	Lindisfarne	Lindisfarne
River Derwent	Rose Bay	Lindisfarne
River Derwent	Montagu Bay	Rosny Park

Rose Bay is a suburb of the City of Clarence in greater Hobart, capital city of Tasmania, Australia. Rose Bay is a small suburb, making up only approximately 0.9 square kilometres with nearly one fourth of that area (23.2%) being parkland. At the 2016 Census the suburb recorded a population of 1,102 people.

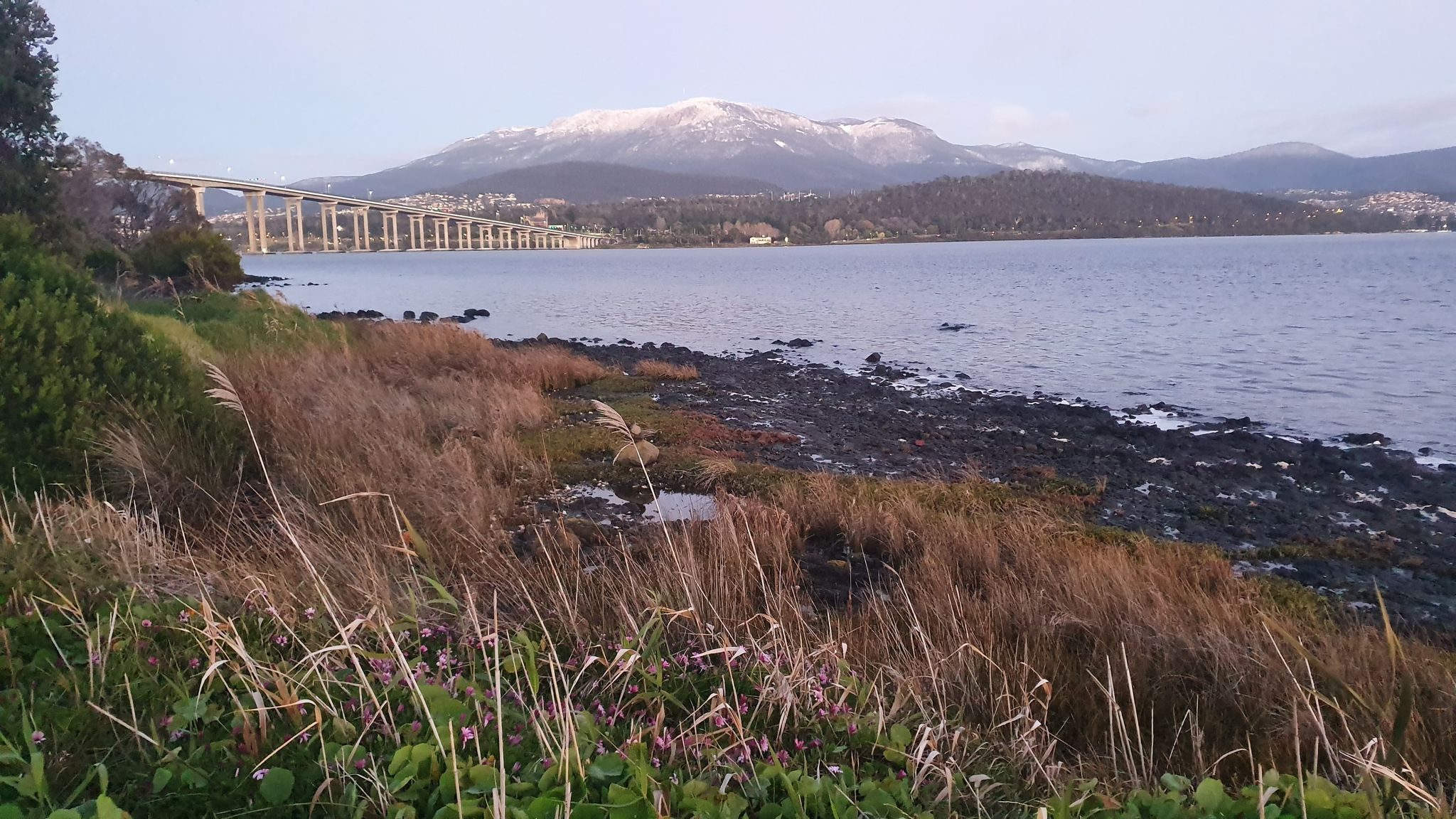
Winter views of a snow covered kunanyi / Mount Wellington, taken at the end of Yolla Street and the start of the Esplanade along the Rose Bay foreshore walk.

== Geography ==
Rose Bay is a suburb located on the Eastern Shore of the River Derwent. It is a suburb less than four kilometres from the city centre of greater Hobart. The size of Rose Bay is approximately 0.9 square kilometres of which nearly one fourth (23.2%) is covered by parkland.

Rose Bay is partly surrounded by the River Derwent with land access from the city via the Tasman Bridge. The suburb can be accessed via the north if coming along East Derwent Highway and from the east and south primarily via the Tasman Highway. Rose Bay suburb is north facing which also means the property in the area get the most direct sunlight through the day, especially in winter when the sun is at its lowest.

Rose Bay's neighbouring suburbs are Lindisfarne, Montagu Bay and Rosny.

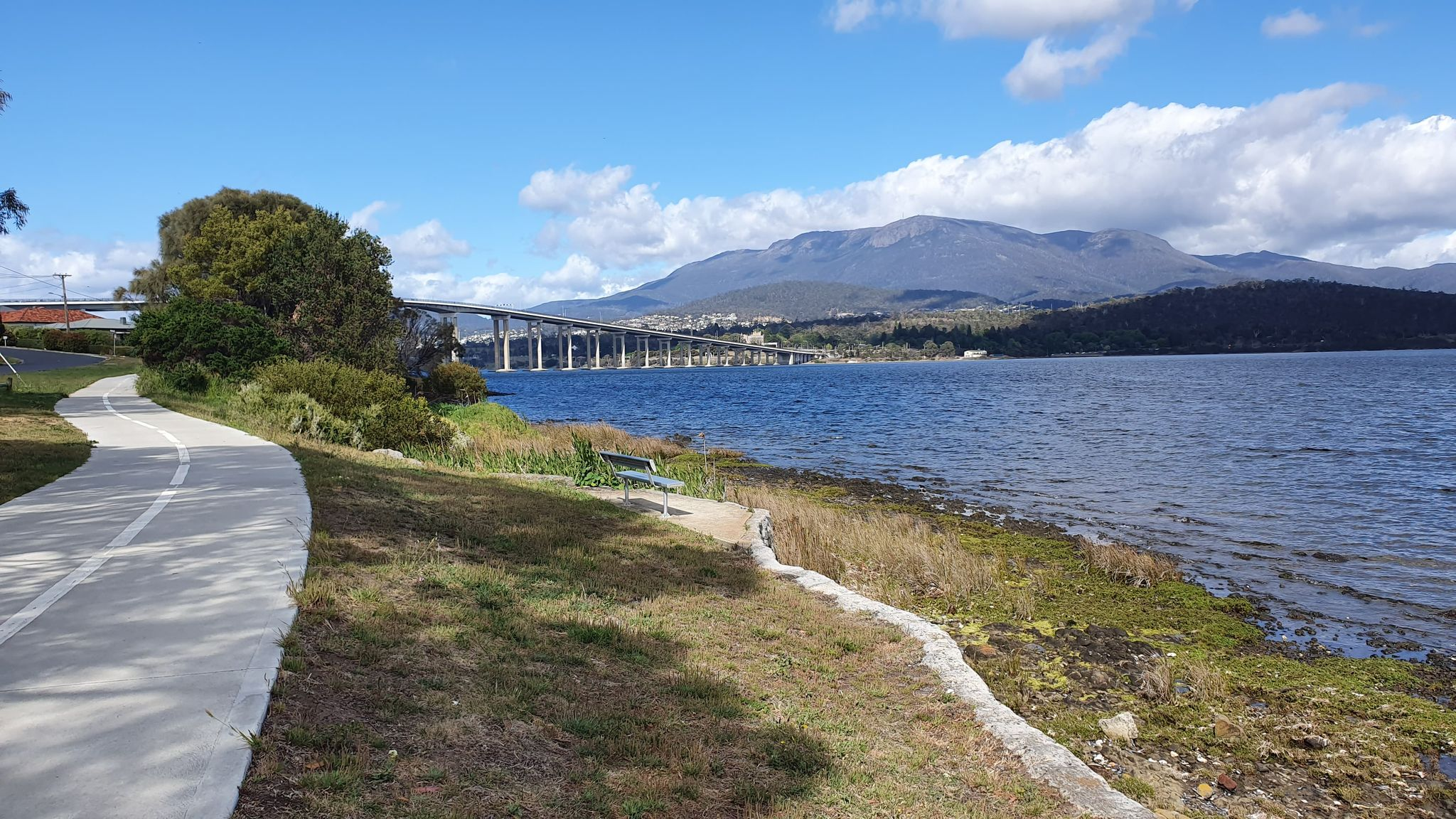
Rose Bay foreshore walk is part of the Clarence Foreshore Trail and is dotted with benches to rest and enjoy excellent views.

Rose Bay is dominated by its proximity to water and nature, and Rose Bay residents generally have very good views of the Tasman Bridge, River Derwent and kunanyi / Mount Wellington. Marana Avenue, The Esplanade, Yolla Street and Topham Street are all streets in Rose Bay known for their water and mountain views.

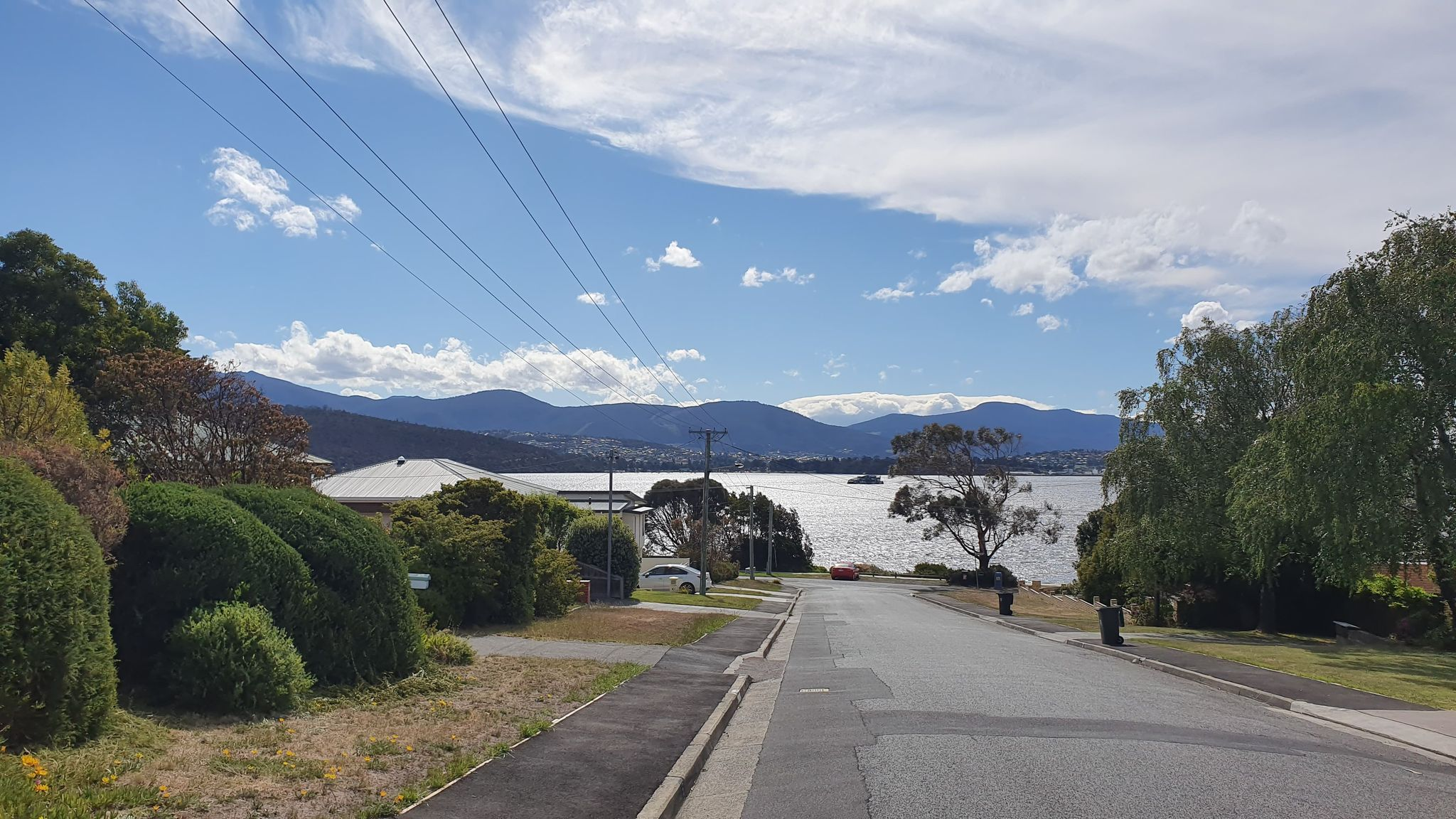
Iconic views from Yolla Street, Rose Bay with the MONA ferry passing by.

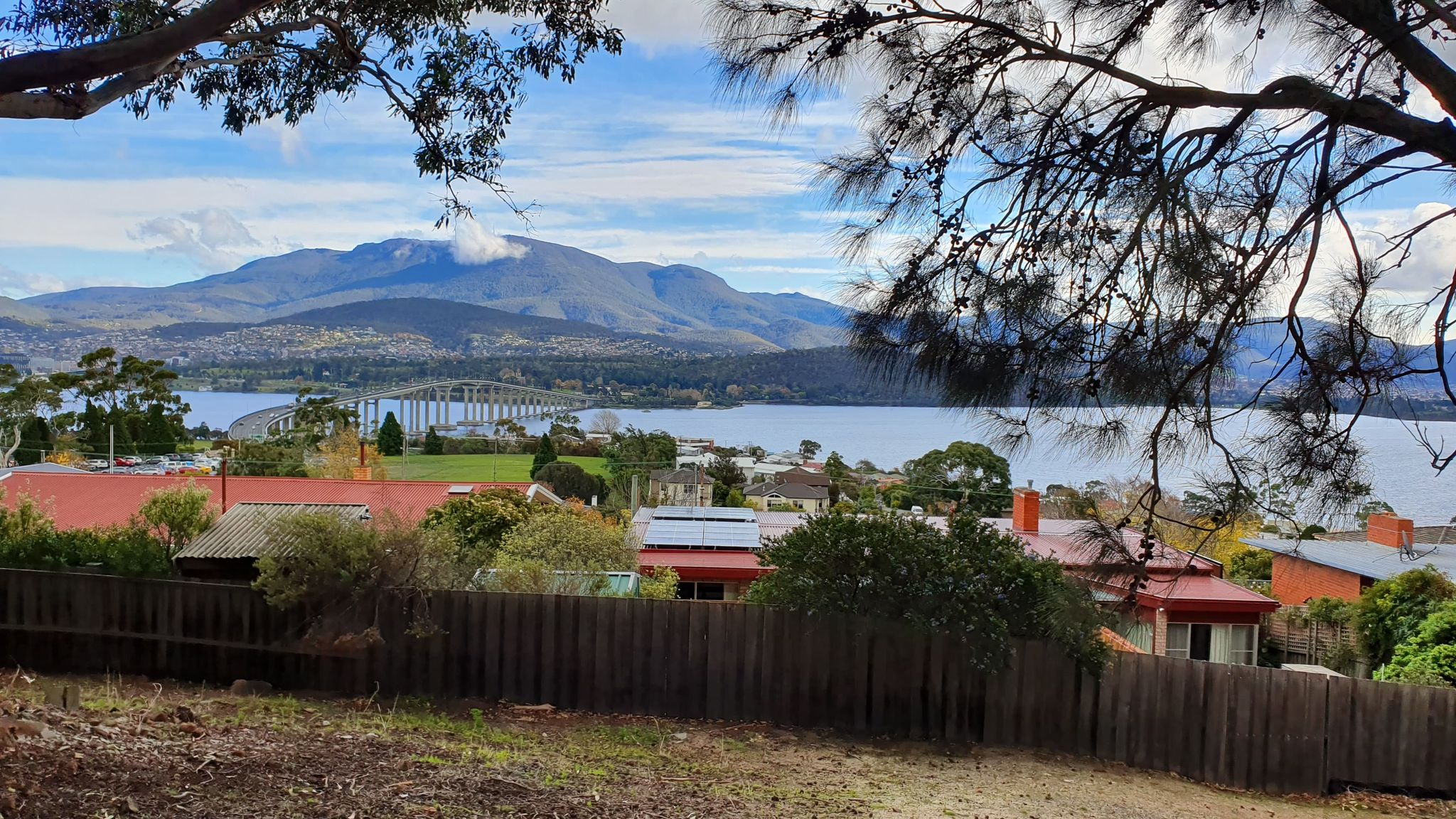
Views of kunanyi/ Mount Wellington and the Tasman Bridge from Gordons Hill Nature Recreation Area in Rose Bay.

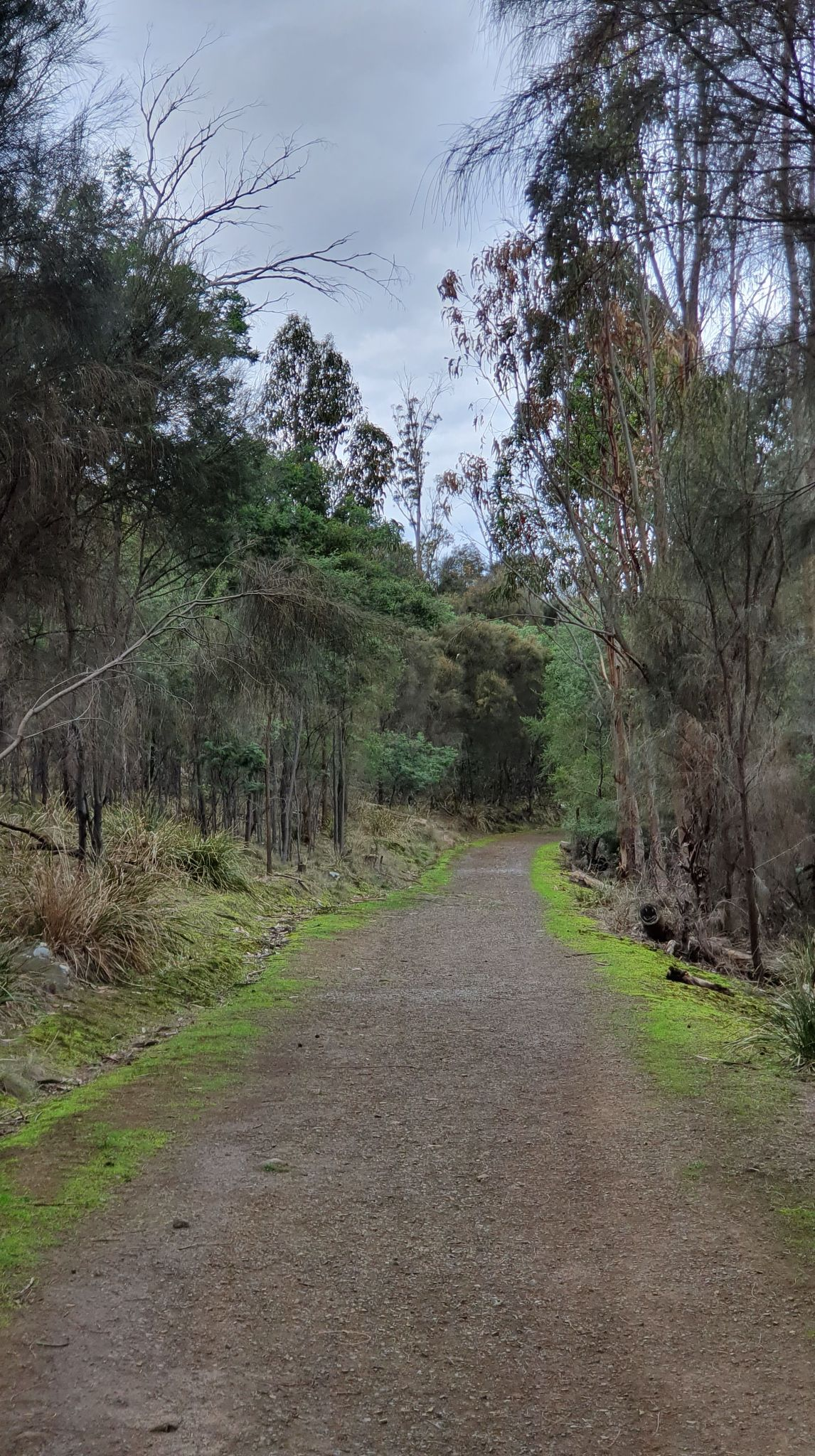
Rose Bay is home of Gordons Hill Nature Recreation Area, suitable for walking, running and mountain biking.

Rose Bay's eastern edge borders to Gordons Hill Nature Recreation Area, managed by Tasmania Parks and Wildlife Service. It offers locals a 2.6 km circuit suitable for walking, running or mountain biking with views back towards the city centre across the Derwent River. The hill is also home to Tasmanian wildlife with Rose Bay locals having named the trails after the wallabies and the endemic Tasmanian pademelons who call the recreation area their home.

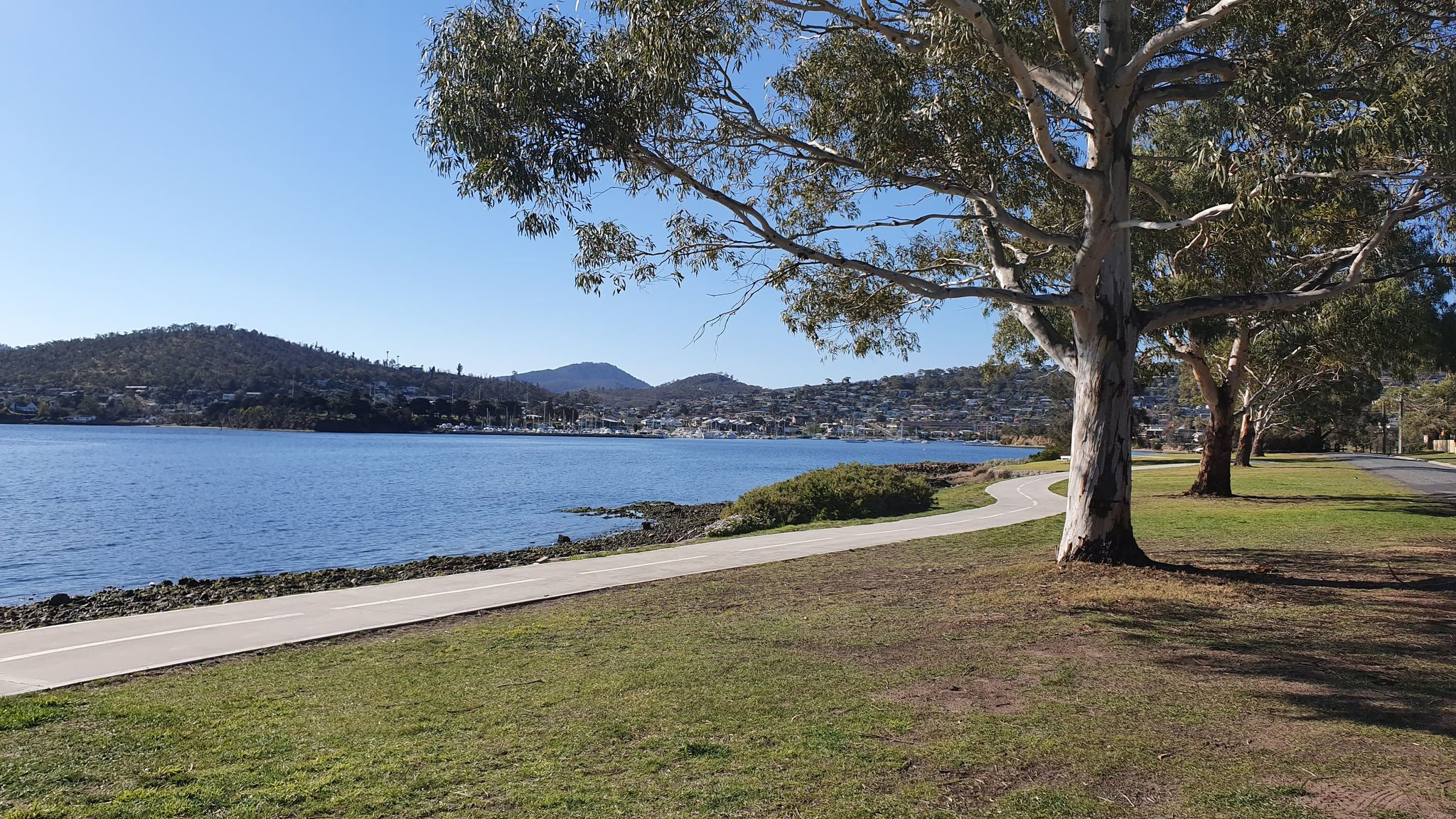
Rose Bay foreshore walk looking back at Lindisfarne bay and the bluff.

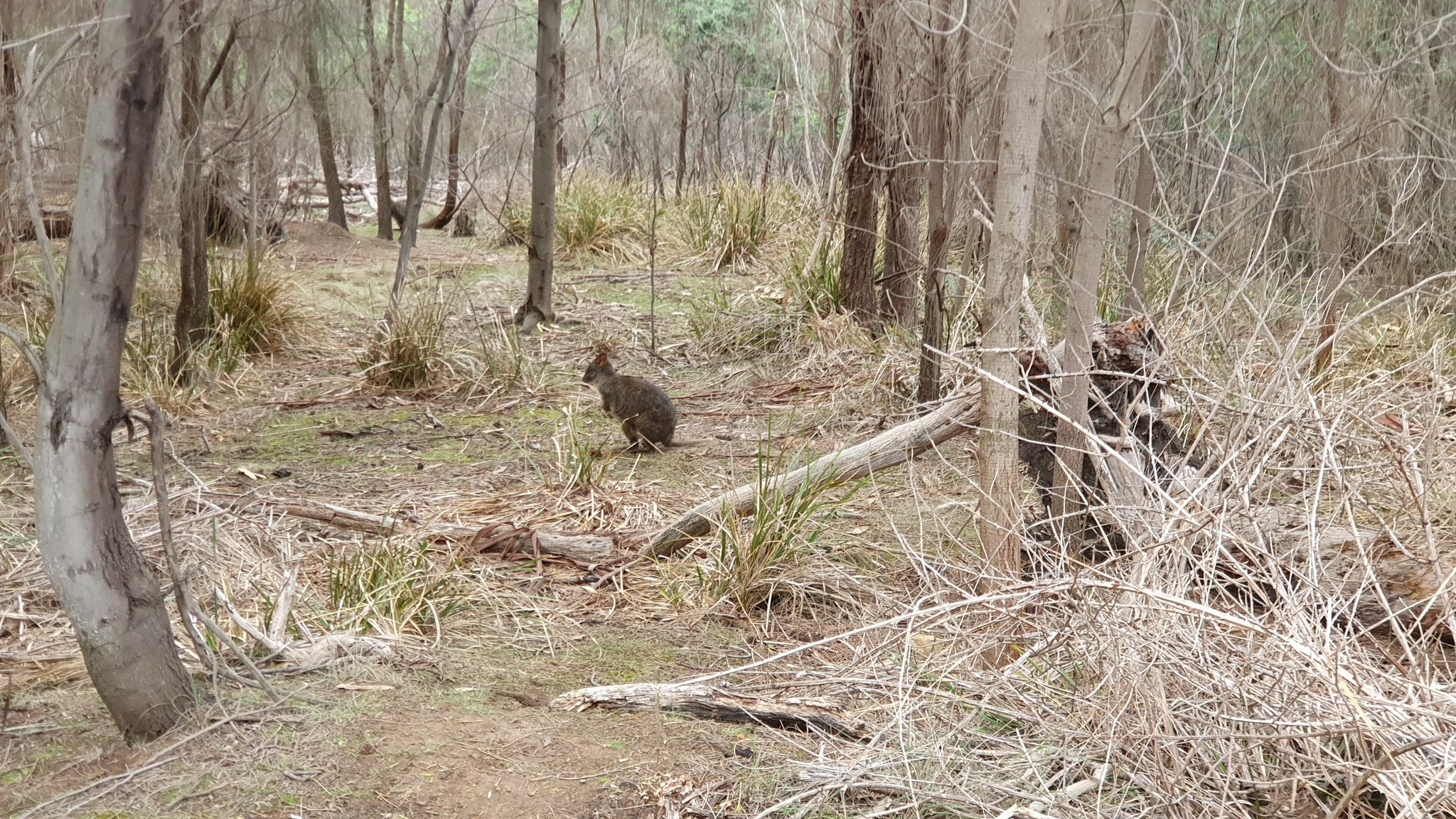
Tasmanian wildlife can be spotted along the Gordons Hill Nature Recreation Area circuit in Rose Bay.

Along the river runs the Clarence Foreshore Trail, a 14.5 km multi-user double pathway running between Geilston Bay and Howrah, most of which is undisturbed by motorised vehicles. Hugging the shores of the River Derwent, the trail offers a diverse range of scenery, from picturesque bays filled with moored yachts to she-oak forest and parkland.

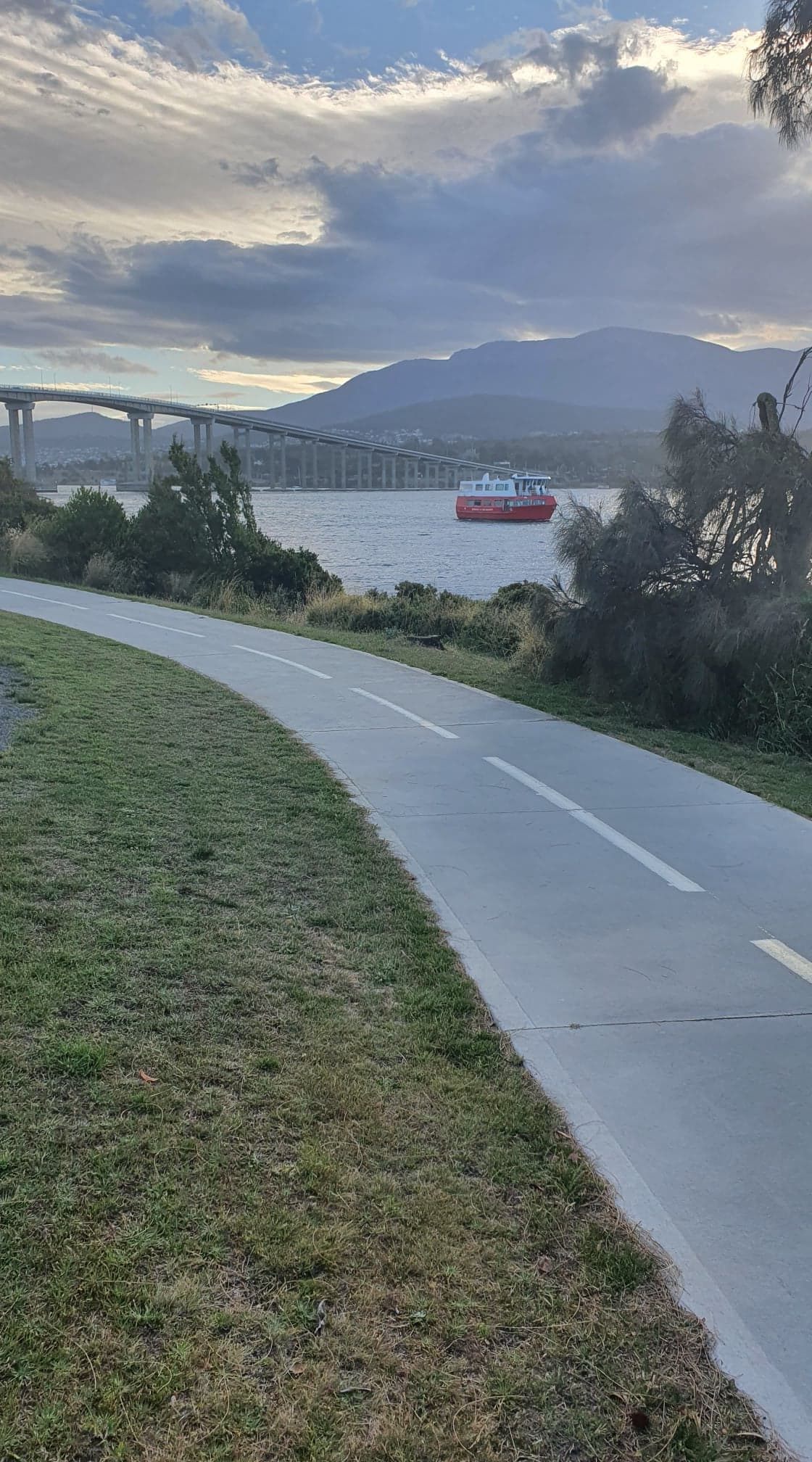
She-oaks thrive along Rose Bay Foreshore walk. Pictured here one summer evening with the Spirit of Hobart in the backdrop.

Along the foreshore walk, Rose Bay residents and visitors are able to enjoy views of Lindisfarne Bay to the north frequently filled with yachts and other vessels at anchor. The bay is also home of The Motor Yacht Club of Tasmania (established 1924), The Lindisfarne Sailing Club (1955) and the Lindisfarne Rowing Club (1905) as well as the ANZAC Park, situated on a bluff, hosting a war memorial, play equipment, barbeques and the site of a large Tasmanian Aboriginal midden.

Looking south, the foreshore walk continues along the water with the Tasman Bridge marking the end of Rose Bay, bordering on to Montagu Bay and Rosny with the Montagu Bay Primary School, founded in 1935 situated on the other side of the Tasman Bridge. This outlook invites views of the Tasman Bridge, connecting the shore to the inner city. Visible across the water is Hobart City, Queens Domain, the home of the Governor, and its neighbouring suburb Cornelian Bay with its iconic boat houses. Dominating the western skyline is kunanyi / Mount Wellington.

== Demographics ==
The 2016 Census recorded 1,102 people in Rose Bay. Of these 49.3% were male and 50.7% were female. The median age was 49 years old with 26.1% of the population 65 years or older and almost one in five (19.6%) were 19 years old or younger. The married population accounts for 52.9% of Rose Bay whilst 24.8% have never been married. 38% of families are couples with children, 47.6% are couples without children, and 13.4% are single-parent families.

Of people aged 15 or older in Rose Bay, the most common education level achieved is a bachelor's degree or higher, 30.3%. This is almost double Tasmania's average of 16.2% and well above the overall national average of 22%.

The most common occupation categories held by Rose Bay residents are: Professionals (28.5%), Managers (16.2%), Clerical and Administrative Workers (14.3%), Community and Personal Service Workers (12.5%), and Sales Workers (9.8%).

=== Ancestry and immigration ===
At the 2016 Census, the most commonly nominated ancestries were:

- English 34.6%
- Australian 28%
- Irish 10.9%
- Scottish 9.8%
- German 2.2%

Aboriginal and/or Torres Strait Islander people made up 0.8% of the Rose Bay population.

87.1% of Rose Bay residents are born on Australia, others include England 2.8%, Scotland 0.8%, New Zealand 0.7%, Ireland 0.6% and Germany 0.6%. In Rose Bay, 70.7% of people have both parents born in Australia and 14.4% of people have both parents born overseas.

=== Language ===
93.0% of people in Rose Bay only speak English at home. Other languages spoken at home include Acholi 0.6% (6 people), non-verbal 0.5% (5 people), German 0.4% (4 people), Italian 0.3% (4 people) and Russian 0.3% (4 people).

=== Religion ===
The most common responses for religion in Rose Bay were "No Religion" (38.4%). One in five, (20.8%) of the residents are Anglican and 18.5% identify as Catholic. Christianity is the largest religious group overall in Rose Bay (57.3%).

== Urban structure ==
=== Architecture ===
Rose Bay is primarily a residential suburb and has an eclectic mix of housing ranging from weatherboards, double brick houses and new builds. There is also an old corner store that has been turned into a residential house. 91.1% of dwellings in Rose Bay are houses with an average of three bedrooms.

=== Housing ===
43.8% of properties in Rose Bay are owned outright and 31.0% are owned with a mortgage whilst 22.8% rent their property. Rose Bay is a tightly held pocket in Hobart with "barely more than a dozen transactions a year, one a month, if you are lucky" according to a local real estate professional. The scarcity of properties for sale is explained by the suburb being the closest suburb to the Tasman Bridge "Rose Bay occupies a privileged position, north facing, close to the city as well as Rosny Park's Eastlands shops and services and 10 minutes to the airport. Virtually all the properties in Rose Bay have some feel and connection to the river so people have that opportunity to get close to the water front without much traffic".

Properties, when for sale, are in high demand in Rose Bay averaging 5006 visits per property compared to Tasmania's average of 2298 visits per property.

In 2021 the median property price in Rose Bay was $978,500 and the median rent was $550 per week.

=== Parks and open spaces ===
Rose Bay Foreshore Park is one of the neighbourhood parks and includes a fenced area with swings and play equipment. It is situated between the foreshore walk and the Esplanade.

Further down the Esplanade towards Lindisfarne is Simmons park. It is considered one of Clarence City Council's "iconic parks" and is a big playground to suit all ages and all abilities. Play equipment includes swings, carousels, balance beams, trampoline, and giant climbing pyramid. The park also accessible with some play equipment available such as a disability access swing, hard paths and accessible unisex toilet. The park has picnic areas and BBQs as well as an amphitheatre. There is also an outdoor gym at Simmons park, The fitness equipment includes leg press, aerobic cycle, chest press, elliptical trainer and body twist, allowing locals to enjoy the outdoors and the water view whilst staying fit and healthy.

The Tasman Bridge Lookout is situated under the Tasman bridge and is a popular fishing spot by the locals.

There is also a book swap box along Rose Bay Foreshore walk when heading towards the Tasman Bridge.

== Infrastructure ==
=== Education ===
Rose Bay suburb is home of Rose Bay High School, founded in 1961. The school is located above the Tasman Bridge with views of River Derwent, kunanyi / Mount Wellington., the city of Hobart and the Tasman Bridge, which can be viewed live via the school's webcam. In 2020, the school enrolled 678 students.

Rose Bay is also situated near Montagu Bay Primary School and Lindisfarne Primary School.

=== Health ===
It will take approx. 6–7 minutes to drive from Rose Bay to Hobart City centre where the state's major public hospital, Royal Hobart Hospital is located. There are also local general practitioners (GPs) at Lindisfarne Village and Eastlands, Rosny Park shopping centre.

=== Transport ===
Rose Bay is easily accessible using a variety of transportation methods. It is a short 6-7-minute drive from Hobart City centre. A majority of Rose Bay residents use their car to travel to work (70%) either as a driver or passenger.

An Uber / Ola ride is approx. $9–10 one way from Hobart City centre to Rose Bay.

Metro Tasmania services Rose Bay with multiple stops. Rose Bay is the last stop on the Eastern Shore before the bus heads across the Tasman Bridge with its following stop being the Royal Hobart Hospital before it arrives at the Hobart bus mall. Likewise, Rose Bay is the first stop once the bus leaves the city centre making the suburb a convenient location for public transport with the commute usually averaging about 10 minutes. Bus stops are located along the Tasman Highway near Rose Bay High School or along the East Derwent Highway depending on bus route.

Rose Bay Foreshore also connects to the Tasman Bridge and the pedestrian and bike path crossing the bridge. It takes about 20 minutes to bike between Rose Bay and Hobart City Centre. 3.9% of Rose Bay residents exclusively walk to work.

==== Tasman Bridge ====
In October 2020, the Tasmanian State Government announced that the Tasman Bridge is set to undergo its first major upgrade since it was repaired following the Lake Illawarra disaster in 1975. Commencing in 2021, the project will be implemented in stages with an anticipated end date of 2023–24. Residents of Rose Bay and the wider Eastern Shore community will as a result, see a significant widening of the bike and pedestrian path across the bridge to 3.5 metres on either side of the road, improved barriers and feature lighting of the arches at night. The Bicycle Network labelled the upgrades as a "game changer" and said:

"Wider paths protected from wind and separated from traffic would encourage many more people to ride or walk to the city. Improved paths on the bridge will also be a tourism benefit as visitors would seek the view out over Hobart from the peak of the bridge and ride the Foreshore Trail on the eastern shore."

ABC Hobart published images of the artist's impression, released by the State Government on their Facebook page, images are also available via a google search on the topic "Tasman bridge upgrade".

=== Retail and shopping ===
Rose Bay is primarily a residential area and is free of commercial services and shops. Instead, Lindisfarne Village offers residents close access to convenient amenities including restaurants, cafes, pharmacies, doctors, supermarket, bakeries, butcher, dentist, hairdresser, bookshop, newsagent, bottle shops and petrol station. There is also a local IGA along the East Derwent Highway. Neighbouring suburb Rosny Park is also home to Tasmania's largest shopping centre Eastlands Shopping Centre, open 7 days a week and host of hundreds specialty stores including two major discount department stores, Big W and K-mart, and two major supermarkets Coles, and Woolworths, as well as a multi-level carpark. Rosny Park is also the Central Business District (CBD) on the Eastern Shore, housing the head office for Clarence City Council as well as offices for Services Tasmania, a library, Op-Shops, fast-food chains and more.

=== Airport ===
Hobart International Airport is a 12-minute drive (15 km) trip from Rose Bay. Thanks to the suburb's location, travellers can easily access the Tasman Highway via the East Derwent Highway.

== Smelter contamination ==
Operating since 1917, the Risdon Zinc Works (trading as Nyrstar Hobart) at nearby Lutana, continues to produce heavy metal contaminants affecting the air, land and estuary waters surrounding Greater Hobart.

In the 1980s, top soil samples from Lutana, Geilston Bay and Lindisfarne revealed high concentrations of zinc, lead, and cadmium. The sampling also revealed that the prevailing wind directions, the terrain of the land, and proximity to the smelter had an impact on the contamination's dissemination pattern.

Early to mid-1990s soil sampling around Lutana and the eastern shore revealed that increased levels of cadmium, lead, and zinc were confined to the top 50 millimetres (2.0 in) of the soil profile, with the bulk concentrated in the top 20 millimetres (0.79 in).

A 2009 report conducted by the CSIRO recommended that home-grown vegetables vulnerable to the uptake of heavy metals, including lettuce, spinach, carrot and beetroot, should be grown in raised garden beds with a minimum depth of 30 centimetres (12 in) clean soil.

Drawing from data complied in the National Pollutant Inventory, a report by the Australian Conservation Foundation placed Hobart at number 6 of Australia's most polluted cities in 2018. The data identified medium levels of air pollution in postcodes 7009 (Lutana, Derwent Park, Moonah, West Moonah), 7010 (Glenorchy, Rosetta, Montrose, Goodwood, Dowsing Point) and 7015 (Lindisfarne, Geilston Bay, Rose Bay) with average air contaminate readings of 40% NO_{x} (nitric oxide (NO) and nitrogen dioxide (NO_{2})), and sulfur dioxide (SO_{2}) contributing 57% of airborne emissions.

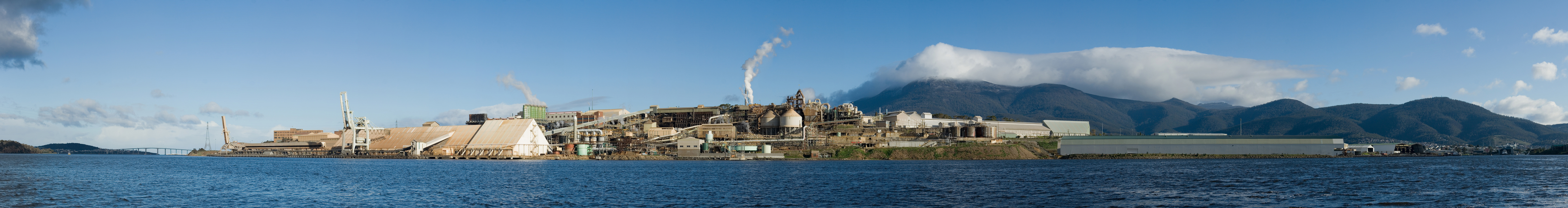
The zinc works at Lutana is the largest exporter in Tasmania, generating 2.5% of the state's GDP. It produces over 280,000 tons of zinc per year.
