= Dowsing Point =

Dowsing Point Hobart, Tasmania
- Coordinates: 42°49′22″S 147°18′10″E
- Population: 77 (SAL 2021)
- Postcode(s): 7010
- Location: 2 km (1 mi) NE of Glenorchy
- LGA(s): City of Glenorchy
- Region: Hobart
- State electorate(s): Clark
- Federal division(s): Clark
Suburbs around Dowsing Point:
River Derwent	River Derwent	(Bowen Bridge)
Elwick	Dowsing Point	River Derwent
Goodwood	Prince of Wales Bay	River Derwent

Dowsing Point is a residential locality in the local government area (LGA) of Glenorchy in the Hobart LGA region of Tasmania. The locality is about 2 kilometres (1.2 mi) north-east of the town of Glenorchy. The 2016 census recorded a population of 85 for the state suburb of Dowsing Point.

It is a locality of the greater area of Hobart. It is part of the City of Glenorchy and encompasses the area of land north-east of Goodwood protruding into the River Derwent. It includes the land feature Dowsings Point which marks the north of the entrance to Prince of Wales Bay.

Dowsing Point is best known as the western land-end of the Bowen Bridge (Goodwood Road), an arterial road linking the Brooker Highway with the East Derwent Highway.

While the City of Glenorchy classes it as a suburb, there are only a small number of residences within the area located between the Commonwealth land situating the Derwent Barracks, and the Elwick Racecourse.

Dowsing Point is the site of the Tasmanian Technopark, a Qantas call centre, an army barracks and various park lands. In 2007, Mayor Adriana Taylor proposed to have Dowsing Point as the new site of the Royal Hobart Hospital.

== History ==
Dowsing Point is a confirmed locality.

During the Tasman Bridge disaster, Dowsings Point was used as the western side of a Bailey bridge crossing the River Derwent.

== Geography ==
The waters of the River Derwent form the northern, eastern and most of the southern boundaries.

== Road infrastructure ==
Route B35 (Goodwood Road) runs through from west to east.

== Smelter contamination ==
The Risdon Zinc Works (trading as Nyrstar Hobart) at nearby Lutana, which has been in operation since 1917, continues to produce heavy metal contaminants affecting the air, land and estuary waters surrounding Greater Hobart.

Drawing from data complied in the National Pollutant Inventory, a report by the Australian Conservation Foundation placed Hobart at number 6 of Australia's most polluted cities in 2018. The data identified medium levels of air pollution in postcodes 7009 (Lutana, Derwent Park, Moonah, West Moonah) and 7010 (Glenorchy, Rosetta, Montrose, Goodwood, Dowsing Point) with average air contaminate readings of 40% NO_{x} (nitric oxide (NO) and nitrogen dioxide (NO_{2})), and sulfur dioxide (SO_{2}) contributing 57% of airborne emissions.

The Tasmanian Planning Scheme does not mandate the Glenorchy City Council to notify prospective buyers about potential land contamination within the City of Glenorchy.
