= Montrose, Tasmania =

Montrose
- Suburb
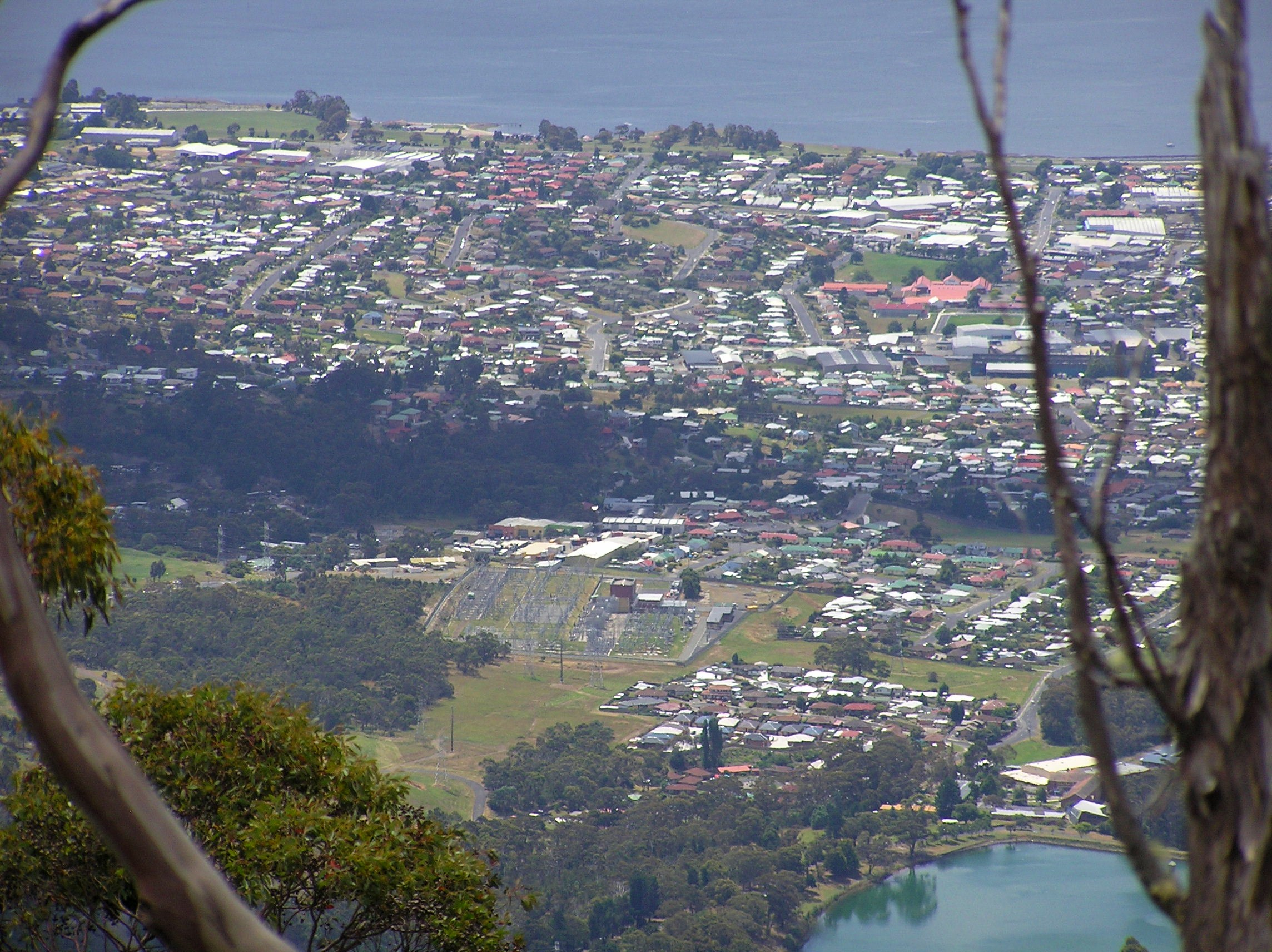
- Montrose viewed from Lost World Track, 2012

- Interactive map of Montrose
- Coordinates: 42°49′41″S 147°15′32″E
- Country: Australia
- State: Tasmania
- Region: Hobart
- City: Hobart
- LGA: City of Glenorchy
- Location: 1 km (0.62 mi) N of Glenorchy

Government
  - State electorate: Clark
  - Federal division: Clark

Population
  - Total: 2,313 (2021 census)
- Postcode: 7010
Suburbs around Montrose
Rosetta	River Derwent	River Derwent
Rosetta	Montrose	Elwick
Glenorchy	Glenorchy	Glenorchy

Montrose is a residential locality in the local government area (LGA) of Glenorchy in the Hobart LGA region of Tasmania. It is situated approximately 1 kilometre (0.62 mi) north of the town of Glenorchy. The 2021 census recorded a population of 2,313 for the state suburb of Montrose.

Montrose is located adjacent to Rosetta, with which it shares a historical connection through colonial-era orchards and mid-20th-century industrial development. The suburb features the Montrose Foreshore Community Park, a recreational area along the River Derwent, offering walking trails, playgrounds, and access to wetlands.

The area includes Montrose Bay High School, which serves students from Glenorchy and surrounding suburbs. The Montrose Bay Yacht Club provides facilities for sailing and boating on the Derwent. The suburb is also near several nature reserves, including foreshore wetlands that support local biodiversity.

Montrose is positioned along major transport routes and is in close proximity to Glenorchy, which provides access to commercial and public services.

== History ==
The suburb was named after Montrose Estate, established in 1806 by Robert Littlejohn. Built on the estate in 1813, Montrose House is the third oldest house in Tasmania. It is permanently listed on the Tasmanian Heritage Register. Montrose was gazetted as a locality in 1961.

Historically, the surrounding hills and shoreline of Montrose was settled by free farmers, establishing an assortment of orchards growing apples, plums, peaches, and apricots. Montrose was served by passenger trains along the Main Line until suburban rail services in Hobart ceased in 1974.

=== Fehlberg pickled onions ===
Elvina Fehlberg established Blue Banner Pickled Onions in the 1930s and operated a factory in Montrose starting in 1950. Coles Supermarkets acquired the family name in the 1980s, however the original recipe pickled onions has made a comeback under the Blue Banner namesake in recent years.

=== Hobart Savings Bank residences ===
Commencing July 1948, the Hobart Savings Bank constructed 38 brick residences near Riverway Road. The housing scheme was catered toward young couples, ex-servicemen and women. The housing designs emphasised diversity and quality, gaining popularity with well-tended gardens and enthusiastic homeowners. By June 1951, the bank moved its housing project to a new subdivision on Marys Hope Road, Rosetta, featuring 26 meticulously designed homes by A. Lauriston Crisp. Like the Riverway Road development, these homes were carefully planned for optimal sunlight and scenic views.

== Geography ==
The waters of the River Derwent form most of the north-eastern boundary.

== Road infrastructure ==
The Number 28 Metro Tasmania Bus Stop is located here. National Route 1 (Brooker Highway) runs through from north-east to south-east.

== Smelter contamination ==
The Risdon Zinc Works (trading as Nyrstar Hobart) at nearby Lutana, which has been in operation since 1917, continues to produce heavy metal contaminants affecting the air, land and estuary waters surrounding Greater Hobart.

Drawing from data complied in the National Pollutant Inventory, a report by the Australian Conservation Foundation placed Hobart at number 6 of Australia's most polluted cities in 2018. The data identified medium levels of air pollution in postcodes 7009 (Lutana, Derwent Park, Moonah, West Moonah) and 7010 (Glenorchy, Rosetta, Montrose, Goodwood, Dowsing Point) with average air contaminate readings of 40% NO_{x} (nitric oxide (NO) and nitrogen dioxide (NO_{2})), and sulfur dioxide (SO_{2}) contributing 57% of airborne emissions.

The Tasmanian Planning Scheme does not mandate the Glenorchy City Council to notify prospective buyers about potential land contamination within the City of Glenorchy.
