= Goodwood, Tasmania =

Goodwood Hobart, Tasmania
- Coordinates: 42°49′45″S 147°17′29″E
- Population: 1,049 (2016 census)
- Postcode(s): 7010
- Location: 2 km (1 mi) E of Glenorchy
- LGA(s): City of Glenorchy
- Region: Hobart
- State electorate(s): Clark
- Federal division(s): Clark
Suburbs around Goodwood:
Elwick	Dowsing Point	Dowsing Point
Glenorchy	Goodwood	Prince of Wales Bay
Glenorchy	Derwent Park	Lutana

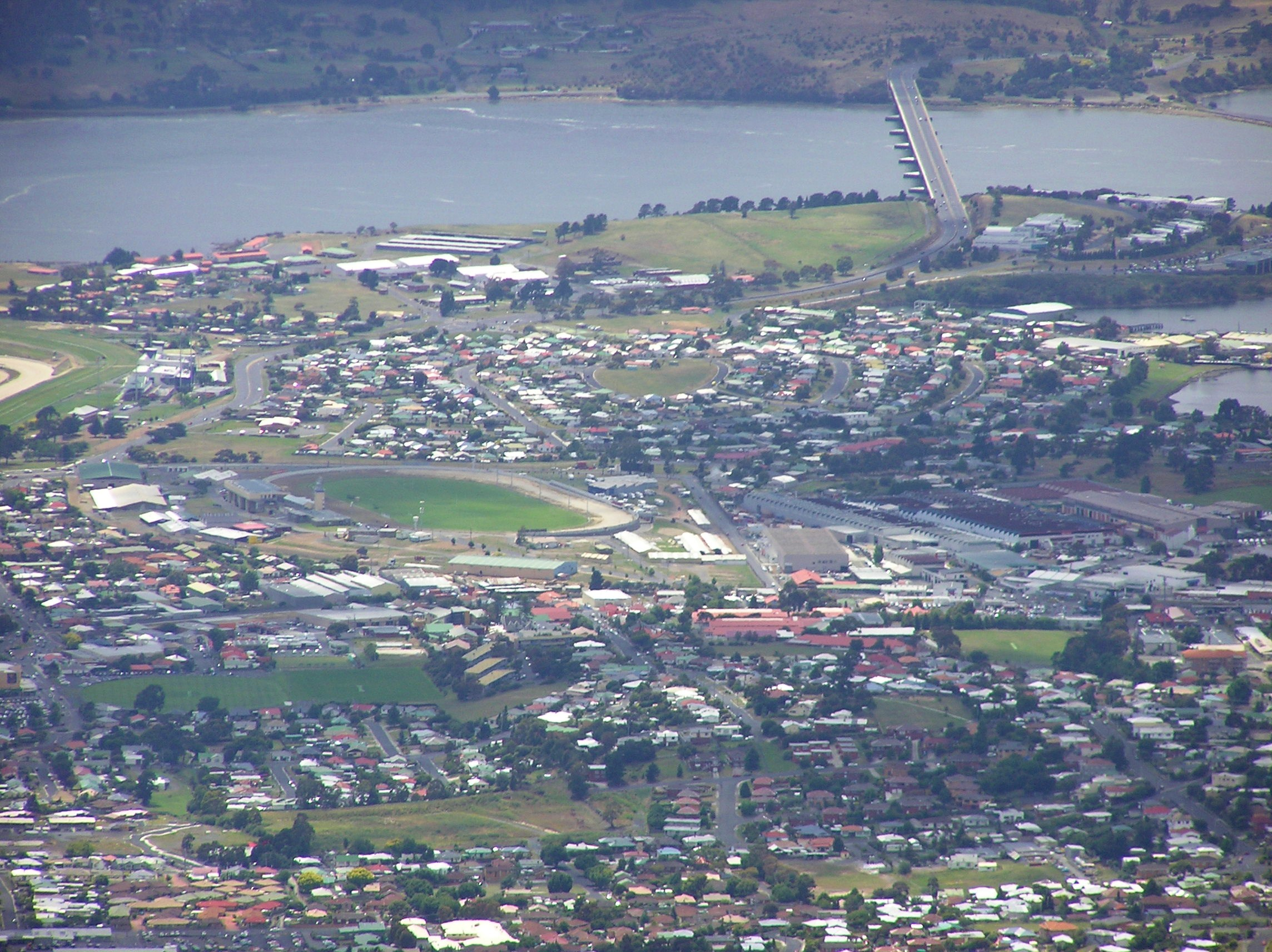
Goodwood suburb of Hobart Tasmania viewed from Lost World near Mount Wellington

Goodwood is a residential locality in the local government area (LGA) of Glenorchy in the Hobart LGA region of Tasmania. The locality is about 2 kilometres (1.2 mi) east of the town of Glenorchy. The 2016 census recorded a population of 1049 for the state suburb of Goodwood. It is a suburb of Hobart.

The small residential suburb starts just south-east of the Brooker Highway and Goodwood Road junction. It is best known for its annual Christmas light decorations. Most houses in Goodwood were built in the 1950s as public housing. The suburb is also home to light industry and docks. An Anglican church and two primary schools are also located in the suburb.

== History ==
Goodwood was gazetted as a locality in 1961.

== Geography ==
The waters of Prince of Wales Bay form the eastern boundary and part of the southern.

== Road infrastructure ==
National Route 1 (Brooker Highway) passes to the south-west, and several roads provide access to the locality.

== Smelter contamination ==
The Risdon Zinc Works (trading as Nyrstar Hobart) at nearby Lutana, which has been in operation since 1917, continues to produce heavy metal contaminants affecting the air, land and estuary waters surrounding Greater Hobart.

Drawing from data complied in the National Pollutant Inventory, a report by the Australian Conservation Foundation placed Hobart at number 6 of Australia's most polluted cities in 2018. The data identified medium levels of air pollution in postcodes 7009 (Lutana, Derwent Park, Moonah, West Moonah) and 7010 (Glenorchy, Rosetta, Montrose, Goodwood, Dowsing Point) with average air contaminate readings of 40% NO_{x} (nitric oxide (NO) and nitrogen dioxide (NO_{2})), and sulfur dioxide (SO_{2}) contributing 57% of airborne emissions.

The Tasmanian Planning Scheme does not mandate the Glenorchy City Council to notify prospective buyers about potential land contamination within the City of Glenorchy.
