= West Moonah =

West Moonah Hobart, Tasmania
- Coordinates: 42°51′3″S 147°16′41″E
- Population: 4,012 (2016 census)
  - Density: 2,230/km^{2} (5,770/sq mi)
- Postcode(s): 7009
- Area: 1.8 km^{2} (0.7 sq mi)
- LGA(s): City of Glenorchy
- State electorate(s): Clark
- Federal division(s): Clark
Suburbs around West Moonah:
Glenorchy	Glenorchy	Derwent Park
Merton	West Moonah	Moonah
Lenah Valley	Lenah Valley	New Town

West Moonah is a residential suburb of Hobart, Tasmania, Australia. It is part of the City of Glenorchy local government area, with about 5% being in the Hobart LGA. At the 2016 Australian census, the suburb recorded a population of approximately 1,000.

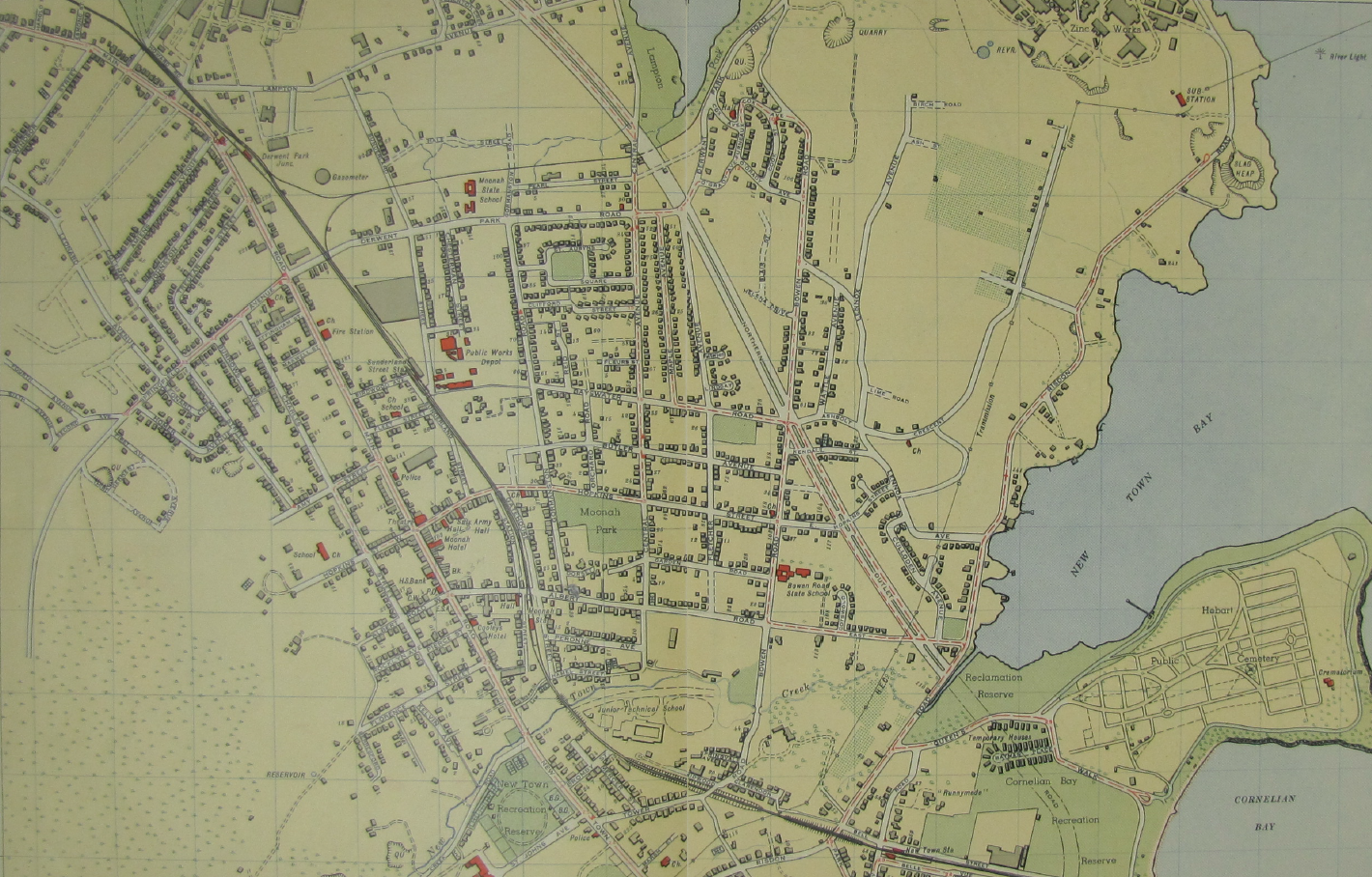
West Moonah and Moonah in 1954

Formerly known as Springfield, the area is fast becoming acceptable because of its closeness to the city. The West Moonah Community Centre is a hub for community activities in the community. Located next to a park, the Community Centre offers a community preschool, playgroups, community garden, community computer lab, craft classes, walking and other community activities.

West Moonah has two schools. Springfield Gardens Primary School is a public school and the independent Seventh-day Adventist Hilliard Christian School. There are also two parks, including the Jim Bacon Reserve with its community pathway.

West Moonah is nearby shopping areas, schools, churches, government services, sporting facilities and childcare centres in the neighbouring suburbs of Glenorchy, Derwent Park and Moonah. West Moonah is serviced by one bus route. By car, West Moonah is 15 minutes from downtown Hobart and 6 minutes from New Town.

== Smelter contamination ==
The Risdon Zinc Works (trading as Nyrstar Hobart) at nearby Lutana, which has been in operation since 1917, continues to produce heavy metal contaminants affecting the air, land and estuary waters surrounding Greater Hobart.

Drawing from data complied in the National Pollutant Inventory, a report by the Australian Conservation Foundation placed Hobart at number 6 of Australia's most polluted cities in 2018. The data identified medium levels of air pollution in postcodes 7009 (West Moonah, Lutana, Derwent Park, Moonah) and 7010 (Glenorchy, Rosetta, Montrose, Goodwood, Dowsing Point) with average air contaminate readings of 40% NO_{x} (nitric oxide (NO) and nitrogen dioxide (NO_{2})), and sulfur dioxide (SO_{2}) contributing 57% of airborne emissions.

The Tasmanian Planning Scheme does not mandate the Glenorchy City Council to notify prospective buyers about potential land contamination within the City of Glenorchy.
