= Rosetta, Tasmania =

Rosetta Hobart, Tasmania
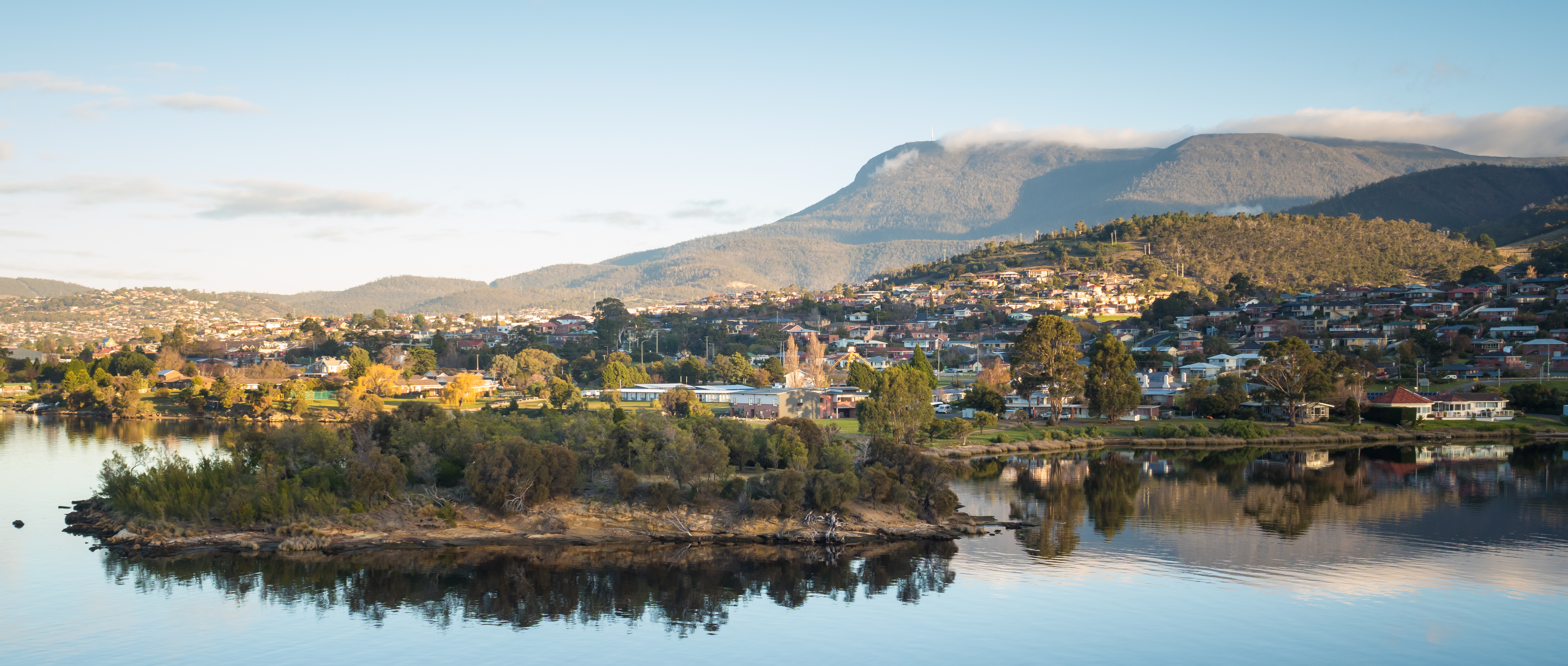
- View of Rosetta and Mount Wellington from the Museum of Old & New Art in 2018

- Coordinates: 42°49′25″S 147°15′1″E
- Population: 2,833 (2021 census)
- Postcode(s): 7010
- Location: 3 km (2 mi) NW of Glenorchy
- LGA(s): City of Glenorchy
- Region: Hobart
- State electorate(s): Clark
- Federal division(s): Clark
Suburbs around Rosetta:
Chigwell	Berriedale	River Derwent
Berriedale	Rosetta	River Derwent
Collinsvale	Montrose	Montrose

Rosetta is a residential suburb about 3 kilometres (1.9 mi) northwest of Glenorchy, located in local government area (LGA) of City of Glenorchy. In the 2021 census, Rosetta had a population of 2,833. This suburb is part of the Hobart LGA Region, nestled between Berriedale and Montrose and roughly a 15-minute drive from Hobart. Rosetta features a primary school and a high school and is bordered by the Brooker Highway along the east, adjacent to the River Derwent.

== History ==
Historically, the surrounding hills and shoreline of Rosetta was settled by free farmers, establishing an assortment of orchards growing apples, plums, peaches, and apricots. Originally the suburb was part of Montrose. Katoomba Crescent, originally Evacuee Road, was renamed in 1958. Rosetta was gazetted as a locality in 1961. Rosetta was served by Tasmanian Government Railways trains along the Main Line until suburban rail services in Hobart ceased in 1974.

=== Marys Hope Farm ===
The land which became Marys Hope Farm was initially granted to Frederick Bück, a free Prussian immigrant in the 1840s. "Mary" in Mary's Hope most likely refers to Frederick's wife, Marie Henriette Christiana Buck (née Grallert), whose name was anglicised to Mary on her children's birth records. Mary died at aged 30, just 10 days after giving birth to her seventh child. The pre-1850s sandstone farmhouse stood atop the hill, overlooking Berriedale and the current Museum of Old & New Art site was destroyed in the 1967 bushfires. Today, the main road leading toward the former homestead is called Marys Hope Road.

=== Hobart Savings Bank residences ===
Commencing July 1948, the Hobart Savings Bank constructed 38 brick residences near Riverway Road, Montrose. The housing scheme was catered toward young couples, ex-servicemen and women. The housing designs emphasised diversity and quality, gaining popularity with well-tended gardens and enthusiastic homeowners. By June 1951, the bank moved its housing project to a new subdivision on Marys Hope Road, Rosetta, featuring 26 meticulously designed homes by A. Lauriston Crisp. Like the Riverway Road development, these homes were carefully planned for optimal sunlight and scenic views.

== Smelter contamination ==
The Risdon Zinc Works (trading as Nyrstar Hobart) at nearby Lutana, which has been in operation since 1917, continues to produce heavy metal contaminants affecting the air, land and estuary waters surrounding Greater Hobart.

Drawing from data complied in the National Pollutant Inventory, a report by the Australian Conservation Foundation placed Hobart at number six of Australia's most polluted cities in 2018. The data identified medium levels of air pollution in postcodes 7009 (Lutana, Derwent Park, Moonah, West Moonah) and 7010 (Glenorchy, Rosetta, Montrose, Goodwood, Dowsing Point) with average air contaminate readings of 40% NO_{x} (nitric oxide (NO) and nitrogen dioxide (NO_{2})), and sulfur dioxide (SO_{2}) contributing 57% of airborne emissions.

The Tasmanian Planning Scheme does not mandate the Glenorchy City Council to notify prospective buyers about potential land contamination within the City of Glenorchy.

== Geography ==
The River Derwent forms the north-eastern boundary.

== Road infrastructure ==
National Route 1 (Brooker Highway) runs through from north-east to south-east.

== Retail/facilities of Rosetta ==
- Rosetta Plumbing
- Marys Hope Road, hot food and convenience store
- Undine Colonial, bed and breakfast
