= Glenorchy, Tasmania =

Glenorchy
- Suburb
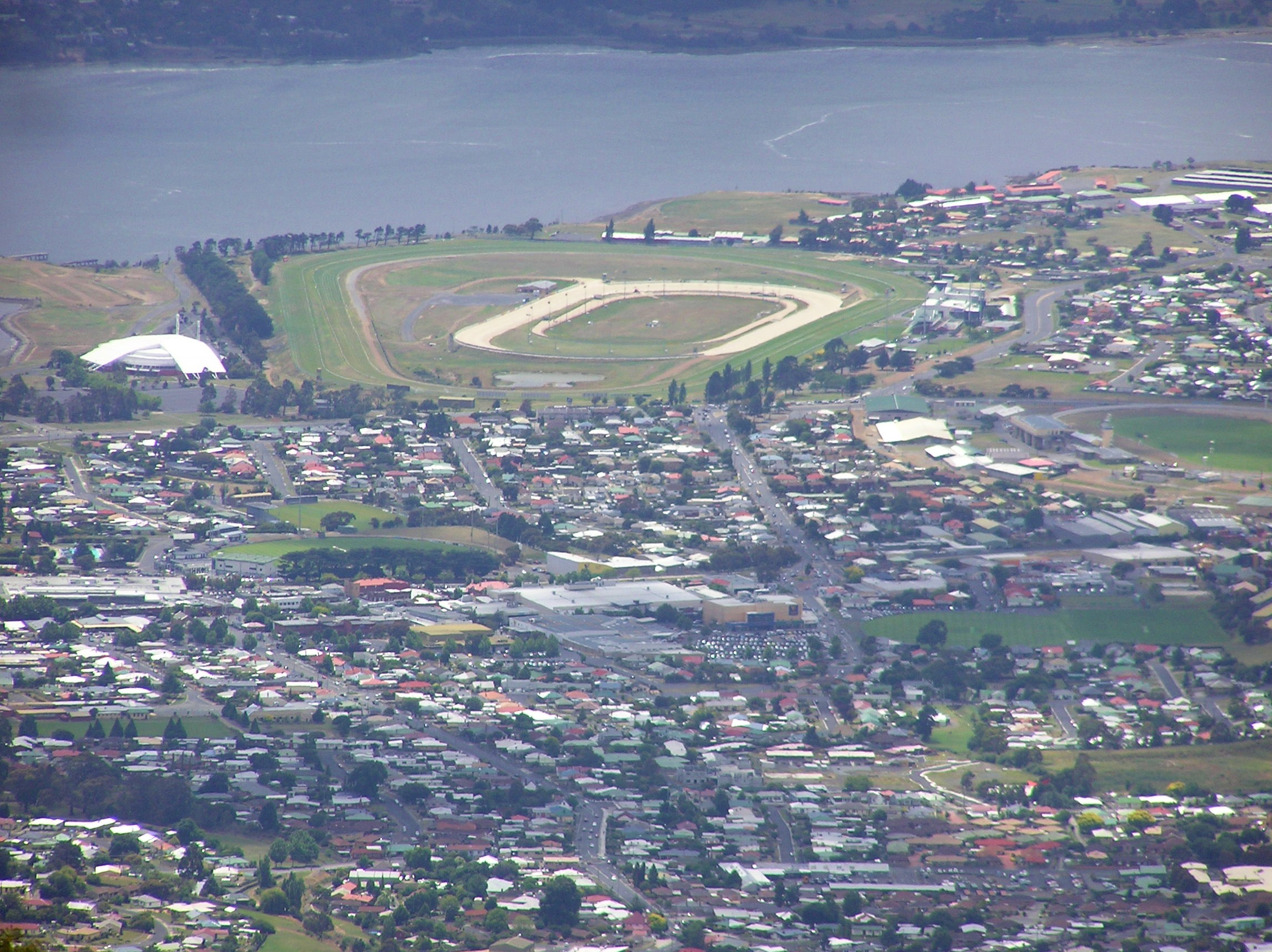
- Glenorchy, Elwick Racecourse viewed from kunanyi/Mount Wellington

- Interactive map of Glenorchy
- Coordinates: 42°49′59″S 147°16′33″E
- Country: Australia
- State: Tasmania
- City: Hobart
- LGA: City of Glenorchy

Government
  - State electorate: Clark
  - Federal division: Clark

Area
  - Total: 10.5 km^{2} (4.1 sq mi)

Population
  - Total: 12,013 (SAL 2021)
- Postcode: 7010
Suburbs around Glenorchy
Montrose	Elwick	Goodwood
	Glenorchy	Derwent Park
Merton	West Moonah	Moonah

Glenorchy is a suburb of Hobart, Tasmania, Australia. Glenorchy is bound by the River Derwent to the east, Mount Wellington to the west, Hobart City to the south and Brighton to the north. The city officially begins at Creek Road New Town, in Hobart's northern suburbs, and includes, Moonah, Derwent Park, Lutana, Goodwood, Montrose, Rosetta, Berriedale, Chigwell, Claremont and Austins Ferry. It is the seat of the local government area of the same name, the City of Glenorchy.

Glenorchy draws its name from Glen Orchy, Scotland, meaning "Glen of tumbling waters".

== Overview ==
Glenorchy was first occupied in the year 1804, being mostly agricultural land from the 1820s onward, with orchards being the prime commercial industry for the area. Becoming a municipality in 1864 and then officially a city in 1964, Glenorchy is now a largely suburban, working class area, which grew quickly after WWII when a great number of returning soldiers settled in the northern suburbs.

Glenorchy has entertainment facilities including the Glenorchy Pool, a Village Cinemas complex, KGV Oval which houses the Glenorchy Football Club, and a bowls club. Glenorchy is also home to the Tasmanian Transport Museum and Glenorchy Art and Sculpture Park.

Schools in the area include Glenorchy Primary School, Cosgrove High School, Guilford Young College and Dominic College.

Glenorchy is passed through by the Main Road of Greater Hobart, and the Brooker Highway which is the main connection to surrounding councils. When the Brooker Highway was built in 1952, it extended from Hobart to Berriedale. During this time, areas of Glenorchy and Moonah undertook street widening works in order to cope with increased traffic from the south.

Significant areas of Glenorchy include:

- Elwick is the name given to the area east of the Brooker Highway, including the Elwick Racecourse (where the Hobart Cup is raced) and the Hobart Showground, which represents all of Southern Tasmania.
- Merton refers to the Barossa Road area, and the surrounding bushlands between Glenorchy and Lenah Valley.
- O'Brien's Bridge is the name given to the site of first settlement in 1809.

At the 2016 Australian census, the suburban Glenorchy area had a population of 10,828, with the Glenorchy City population totalling 46,397.

== Retail ==
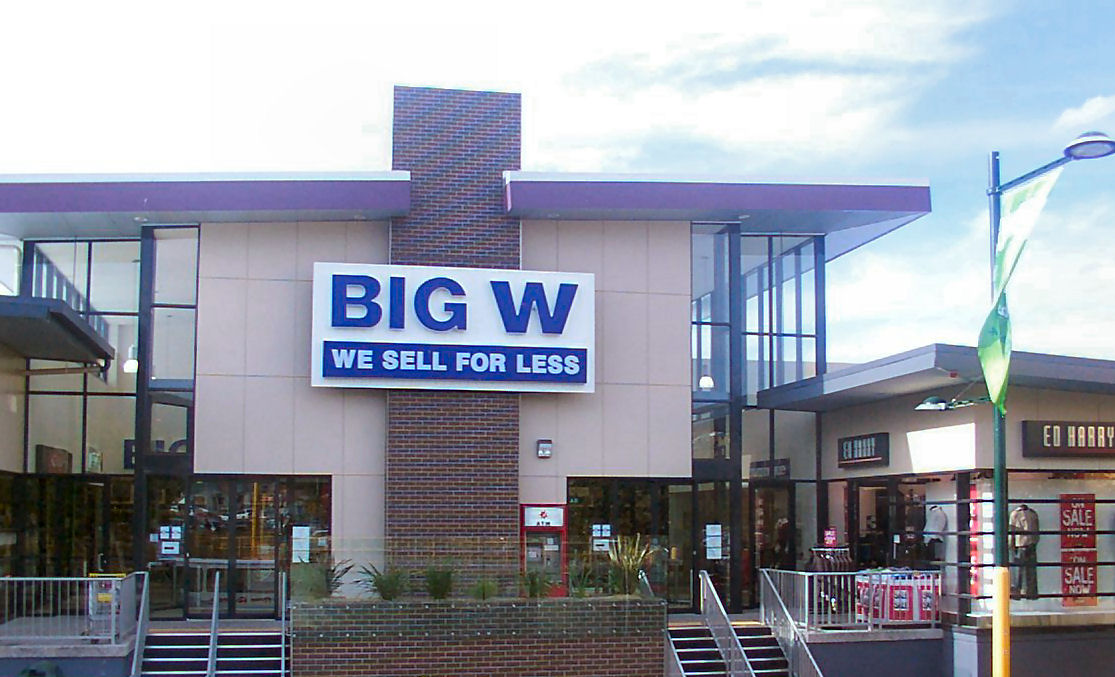
Big W Glenorchy

The Glenorchy Central business district has three major indoor shopping centres, Northgate Shopping Centre, Glenorchy Central and Glenorchy Plaza. Leading retail stores in Glenorchy include Best & Less, Coles, Woolworths, Big W, and Target,(Now closed). as well as a Bunnings located on the eastern edge of the Hobart show grounds on the Brooker Highway near Goodwood, with access via Howard Road.

Glenorchy has the second largest shopping district in Tasmania, following the Hobart central business district. Glenorchy CBD is one of the three main commercial districts in Glenorchy City, as well as those in Moonah and Claremont.

== Smelter contamination ==
The Risdon Zinc Works (trading as Nyrstar Hobart) at nearby Lutana, which has been in operation since 1917, continues to produce heavy metal contaminants affecting the air, land and estuary waters surrounding Greater Hobart.

Drawing from data complied in the National Pollutant Inventory, a report by the Australian Conservation Foundation placed Hobart at number 6 of Australia's most polluted cities in 2018. The data identified medium levels of air pollution in postcodes 7009 (Lutana, Derwent Park, Moonah, West Moonah) and 7010 (Glenorchy, Rosetta, Montrose, Goodwood, Dowsing Point) with average air contaminate readings of 40% NO_{x} (nitric oxide (NO) and nitrogen dioxide (NO_{2})), and sulfur dioxide (SO_{2}) contributing 57% of airborne emissions.

The Tasmanian Planning Scheme does not mandate the Glenorchy City Council to notify prospective buyers about potential land contamination within the City of Glenorchy.
