= Risdon Zinc Works =

Zinc refinery in Lutana, Tasmania, Australia

Coordinates: 42°49′55.18″S 147°19′3.74″E

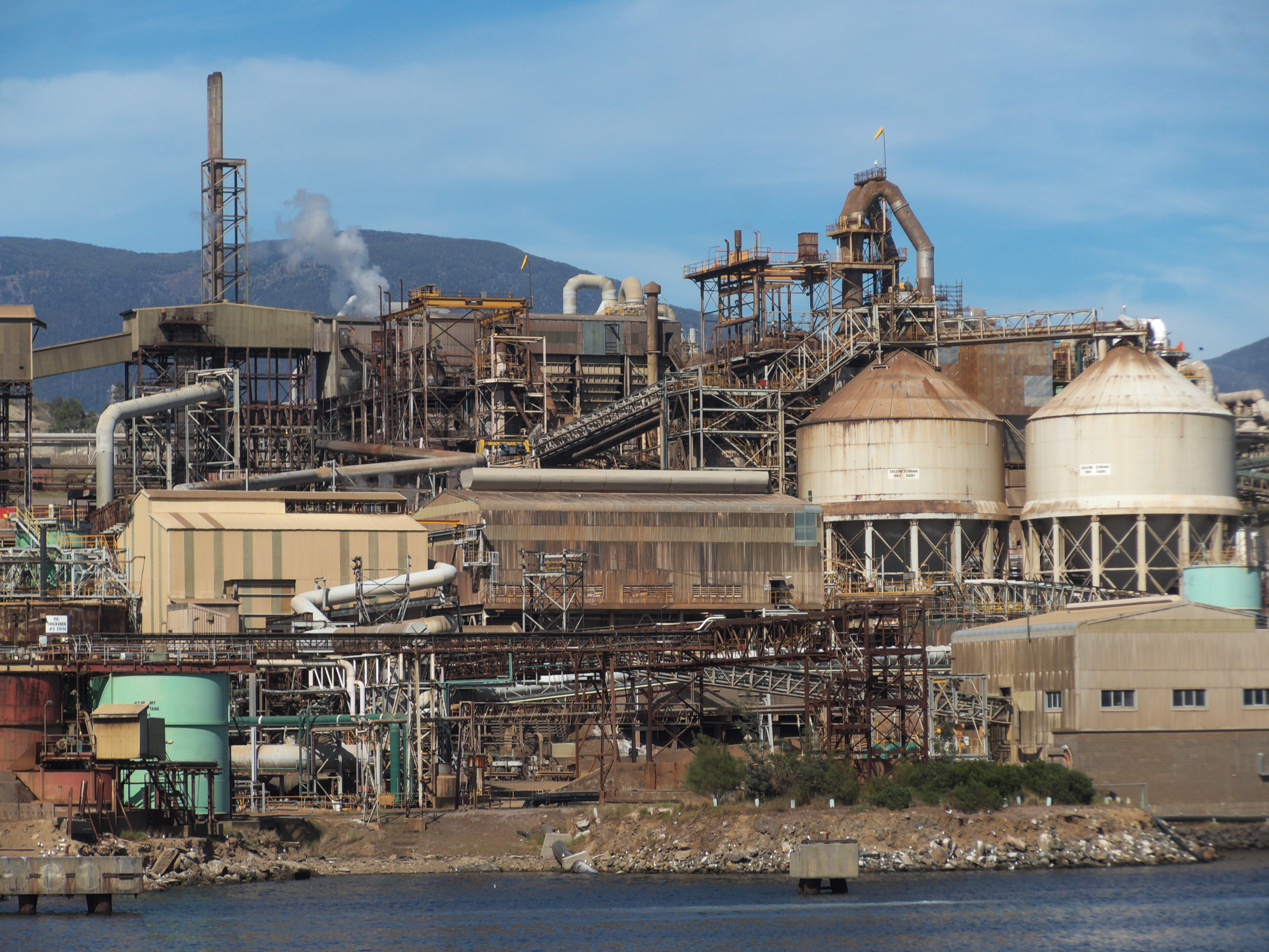
- The smelter in November 2017
- Trade name: Nyrstar Hobart
- Formerly: Electrolytic Zinc Company
- Industry: Zinc smelting
- Founded: 16 November 1916
- Owner: Nyrstar
- Number of employees: 600 (2017)
- Website: nyrstarhobart.com

Risdon Zinc Works (trading as Nyrstar Hobart) is a major zinc refinery located in Lutana, a suburb of Hobart, Tasmania, Australia. The smelter is one of the world's largest in terms of production volume, producing over 280,000 tonnes (280,000 long tons; 310,000 short tons) annually of high-grade zinc, primarily as die-cast alloys and continuous galvanising-grade alloys. These products are exported for global markets and utilised in a wide range of industries and products, from building and infrastructure to transportation, business equipment, communications, electronics, and consumer goods. The facility produces zinc using the roast, leach, electrowinning method, creating leach byproducts, including cadmium, gypsum, copper sulphate, lead sulphate, sulphuric acid, paragoethite and leach concentrate. The refinery has been owned and operated by the global multi-metals business Nyrstar since 2007. Nyrstar Hobart works closely with Nyrstar's Port Pirie multi-metals smelter in South Australia. The facility is Tasmania's largest exporter, contributing 25% of the state's overall export value in 2013.

== History ==
James Hyndes Gillies came to Hobart in 1908 with plans to build a zinc refinery and a hydroelectric facility, the latter of which would produce the electricity needed for a refinery's electrolytic process. Gillies purchased land south of Hobart at Electrona in 1909 with the intention of constructing an electrolytic zinc plant as well as other high energy uses, such as the manufacturing of calcium carbide. Gillies founded the Hydro-Electric Power and Metallurgical Company, and was given permission by the Tasmanian Government to build a dam and power plant in the centre of the state using water from the Great Lake. Lack of funding prevented the construction of the dam and power plant, which was eventually taken over by the Tasmanian Government in 1914. Despite Gillies' continuing efforts to construct a zinc and carbide facility at Electrona, only the carbide factory was completed.

=== Zinc works construction ===
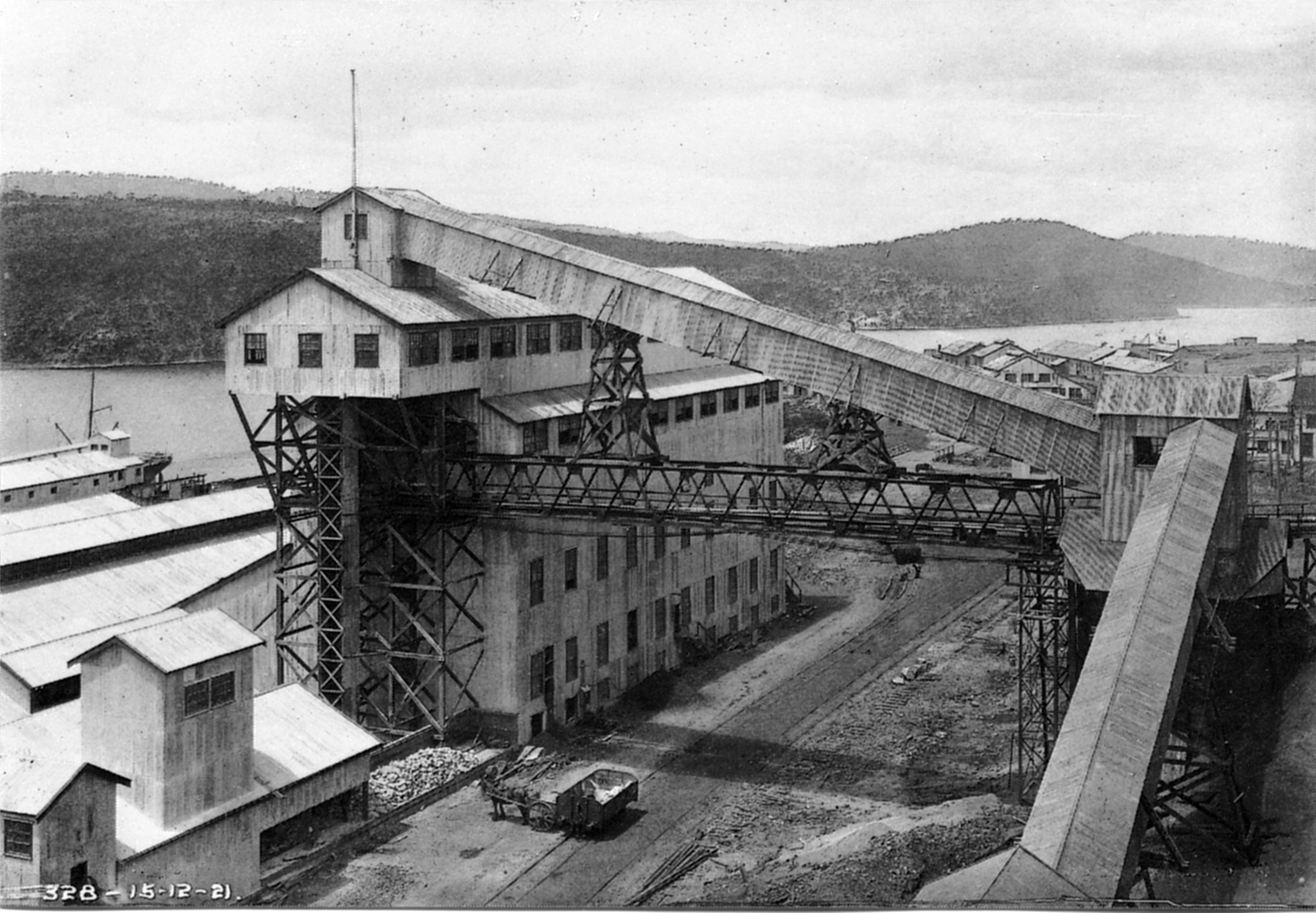
Electrolytic Zinc Company, December 1921

The majority of Britain's supplies came from Germany and Belgium, but when World War I broke out, zinc metal became a scarcity throughout the British Empire, which was needed to manufacture weapons. When Germany invaded Belgium, the price of zinc soared by 312 times.

Construction of the Risdon Zinc Works by EZ Industries commenced in 1916. It opened in 1918. The operations of the Risdon Zinc Works were tied in with the mining of zinc in Rosebery and Williamsford.

Amalgamated Zinc Limited began looking into the production of electrolytic zinc after acquiring thousands of tonnes of high-zinc concentrate in Broken Hill. The company's general manager, Herbert Gepp, was tasked with looking into the procedure when he was in America looking for markets for concentrate. Because of Tasmania's commitment in supplying cheap hydroelectric power, the corporation decided to establish a site there and signed a contract with the government for the delivery of power. During the 1920s the facility saw rapid expansion, becoming the world's largest zinc smelter, a title it held until the late 1930s.

The settlement of the suburb of Lutana was almost exclusively that of EZ workers. Pollution from the works was an issue for the company, and successor companies that operated the works as well as disposal of waste out to sea.

In 1924, the facility began manufacturing superphosphate for the fertiliser industry. Roasting furnaces were built to produce the sulphur dioxide needed to make sulphuric acid. The production of ammonium sulphate began as a means to utilise the sulphuric acid produced as an onsite byproduct. By the mid-1970s, the smelter was exporting seventy-percent of its production overseas.

== Ownership ==
The Risdon Zinc Works works were included in the sale of EZ Industries to North Broken Hill in 1984. The smelter has subsequently been operated by Pasminco, Zinifex and since 2007 by Nyrstar.

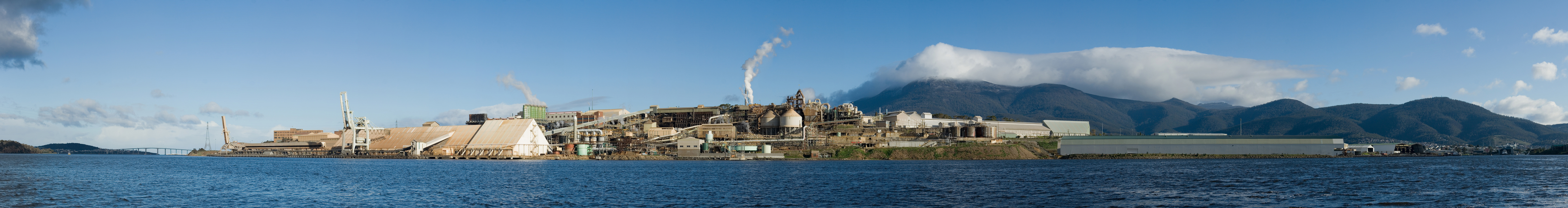
Nyrstar Hobart and Incat shipyard (right) in 2009

== Pollution ==
Historically, run-off from outdoor stockpiles of smelter production contaminated soil on the site, surrounding suburbs and the River Derwent. Despite regular monitoring primarily concerned with legacy pollution, the smelter continues to produce toxic heavy metal contaminants affecting the air, soils and estuary waters surrounding Hobart.

=== Airborne emissions ===
Drawing from data complied in the National Pollutant Inventory, a report by the Australian Conservation Foundation placed Moonah as the most polluted postcode of Hobart in 2018, in a compiled list of postcodes with highest NPI emissions in each Australian capital city. The data identified medium levels of air pollution in postcodes 7009 (Lutana, Derwent Park, Moonah, West Moonah), 7010 (Glenorchy, Rosetta, Montrose, Goodwood, Dowsing Point) and 7015 (Lindisfarne, Geilston Bay, Rose Bay) with average airborne emission readings of 40% NO_{x} (nitric oxide (NO) and nitrogen dioxide (NO_{2})), and 57% sulfur dioxide (SO_{2}).

=== Soil contamination ===
In the 1980s, top soil samples from Lutana, Geilston Bay and Lindisfarne revealed high concentrations of zinc, lead, and cadmium. The sampling also revealed that the prevailing wind directions, the terrain of the land, and proximity to the smelter had an impact on the contamination's dissemination pattern.

Early to mid-1990s soil sampling around Lutana and the eastern shore revealed that increased levels of cadmium, lead, and zinc were confined to the top 50 millimetres (2.0 in) of the soil profile, with the bulk concentrated in the top 20 millimetres (0.79 in).

A 2009 report conducted by the CSIRO recommended that home-grown vegetables vulnerable to the uptake of heavy metals including lettuce, spinach, carrot and beetroot should be grown in raised garden beds with a minimum depth of 30 centimetres (12 in) in clean soil.

=== Estuary and ocean contamination ===
The smelter's discharging of methylmercury (mercury) and other toxic heavy metals into the Derwent estuary greatly contributed in creating one of the most polluted river systems in the world by the close of the 1970s. Deposits of zinc, mercury, cadmium and lead, which are harmful to marine life and accumulate in seafood continue to plague the river greatly due to legacy pollution.

==== Offshore disposal of jarosite ====
In the 1960s, a collaborative patent was established with then-operator Pasminco Metals-EZ and two other companies for a method to eliminate iron from zinc. This procedure involved the extraction of iron in the form of jarosite, a byproduct containing iron, along with various hazardous substances such as cadmium, arsenic, copper, mercury, lead, and residual zinc. From 1971 to 1997, the jarosite process was implemented at Risdon Zinc Works until it was replaced by the paragoethite process, which was also patented at the refinery.

Commencing in 1973, Pasminco Metals-EZ initiated the disposal of jarosite into the southern ocean. Situated approximately 60 nautical miles (110 km; 69 mi) from Hobart beyond the continental shelf in waters with a depth of around 2 kilometres (1.2 mi), research conducted in proximity to the disposal site identified elevated concentrations of heavy metals in marine organisms, including heightened cadmium levels in fish and sea birds.

==== Waste volume estimations ====
Between 1973 and 1997, Pasminco Metals-EZ were legally permitted to load and dump up to 2,400,000 tonnes (2,400,000 long tons; 2,600,000 short tons) of jarosite waste into the southern ocean annually. Annual sea dumping volumes are contested and vary between 1,700,000-tonne (1,700,000-long-ton; 1,900,000-short-ton) and 2,500,000-tonne (2,500,000-long-ton; 2,800,000-short-ton) approximations.

==== Greenpeace Clean Waters campaign ====
On 14 March 1990, at the docks of Electrolytic Zinc, three activists from Greenpeace were apprehended while occupying the masts of the dumping vessel MV Anson. They displayed a banner proclaiming "Stop E. Z. Dumping." As the dump ship departed the dock, Greenpeace protesters made another attempt to board but were met with aggression from Anson crew members. During the altercation, one activist sustained head injuries after a police boat collided with a Greenpeace inflatable vessel. The day after, law enforcement seized four inflatables and the 60-foot (18 m) Greenpeace vessel SV Redbill, indicating they would only be returned if Greenpeace ceased their protests. In response, 250 individuals in 30 boats rallied to support Greenpeace's campaign against ocean dumping and demanded the return of the vessels. The boats were returned the following day, and the Federal Minister for the Environment Ros Kelly announced enhanced monitoring procedures and research into alternative waste disposal methods.

==== Monitoring ====
As part of their operating permit conditions with the Environment Protection Authority, Nyrstar are required to monitor levels of toxic heavy metals in marine life sourced within the Derwent estuary, including oysters, mussels and flathead. Data is collected from the river every five years, with monitoring extending from New Norfolk out to the Iron Pot, with Storm Bay and the neighbouring D'Entrecasteaux Channel excluded from investigation. 2016 statistics revealed that bream and shellfish caught in the river could not be consumed due to high mercury levels.

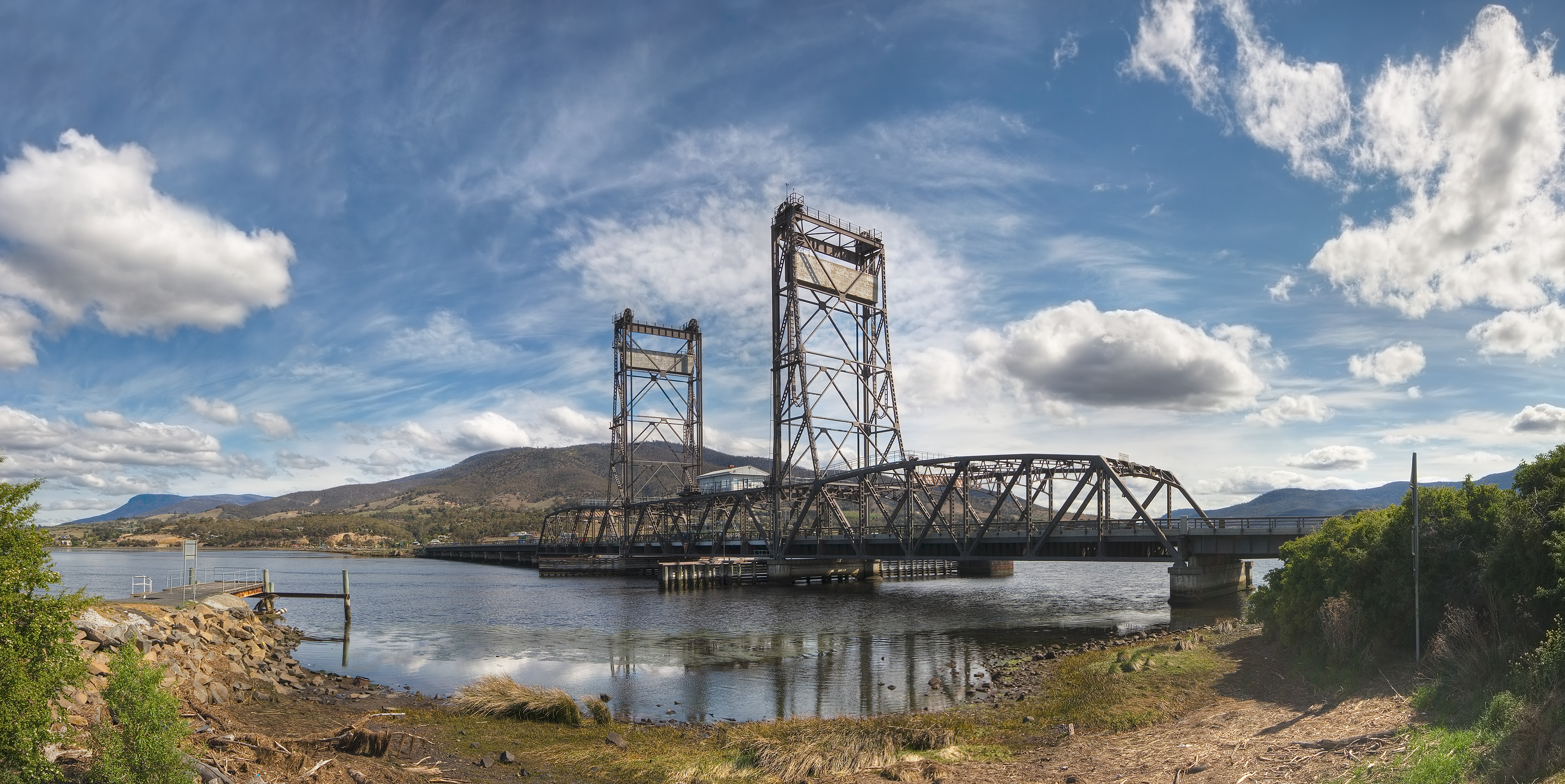
Bridgewater Bridge and causeway in 2008

==== Bridgewater causeway ====
Upstream, the convict-built, 1830s causeway connecting Granton and Bridgewater via the Bridgewater Bridge acts as a catchment for wastewater pollutants from the smelter. Further to this upstream at Boyer, the Boyer Mill routinely pump organic matter, suspended solids, and chemical substances used in the paper-making process into the river. Studies in 2009, 2012 and 2020 have concluded that sludge, wastewater and heavy metal contaminants, including cadmium, lead, zinc and mercury, risk being disturbed by the New Bridgewater Bridge construction project.

==== Groundwater Interception System ====
Developed in collaboration with GHD Group, a Groundwater Interception System (GIS) was constructed in 2010. The GIS is made up of 13 horizontal cased and open hole bores measuring 150 millimetres (5.9 in) in diameter with lengths varying from 160–220 metres (520–720 ft) each. The total length of the free draining bores is little under 2,000 metres (6,600 ft). The neighbouring wastewater treatment facility receives the system's discharge. The system was designed to be low maintenance, containing no pumps or electrical power. The GIS extracts approximately 115 tonnes (113 long tons; 127 short tons) of zinc, 3 tonnes (3.0 long tons; 3.3 short tons) of cadmium, 7 tonnes (6.9 long tons; 7.7 short tons) of aluminium, and 332 tonnes (327 long tons; 366 short tons) of sulphate from groundwater annually.

== Upgrades ==
In order to treat a larger spectrum of metals, Nyrstar invested $52 million to modernise the facility in 2015. With the Tasmanian Government serving as guarantee, the Australian Government's Export Finance and Insurance Corporation authorised a $29 million loan to be used for the refurbishment. In 2022, the Albanese Government contributed $50 million of an estimated $400 million modernisation of the smelter. Nyrstar expect the facility upgrades will streamline the production of up to 300,000 tonnes (300,000 long tons; 330,000 short tons) of cathode zinc per annum.

The Pirie and Hobart smelters received a $135 million dollar government assistance package from August 2025 to April 2026.

== Incidents ==
In 2012, residents of Lutana, Cornelian Bay, Risdon and Lindisfarne were forced to stay indoors following a gas leak attributed to a defective transformer at the smelter, emitting sulphur trioxide and sulphur dioxide. Some areas of the smelter were also evacuated. In 2017, a worker was severely burnt in an explosion whilst overseeing the production of zinc sheets within the electrolysis department. In 2019, a worker with over thirty years experience died at the refinery in an area of the plant susceptible to sulphur dioxide. Nyrstar offered counselling for workers, however the coroner's report revealed that the man had died of natural causes. In 2020, two workers were fired following a brawl in the workplace tearoom.

== Community interaction ==
Nyrstar Hobart opened the site to the public as part of the 2012 Open Doors initiative. In 2013, management began prioritising visitors, encouraging educational institutions and school group to tour the facility. Nyrstar further launched The Big Picture campaign in late 2013, promoting the smelter on billboard and television ads, a website, and social media to emphasise the significance of its smelter operations to the Tasmanian economy.

== Access ==
The main Risdon Zinc Works entrance is located on Risdon Road. The northern entrance is accessible via Derwent Park Road.

== Sources ==
- Ramshaw, Nick (1 June 2012). "Electrolytic Zinc Works - Nomination for a Heritage Recognition Award" (PDF). Institution of Engineers, Australia.
