= Moonah, Tasmania =

Moonah Hobart, Tasmania
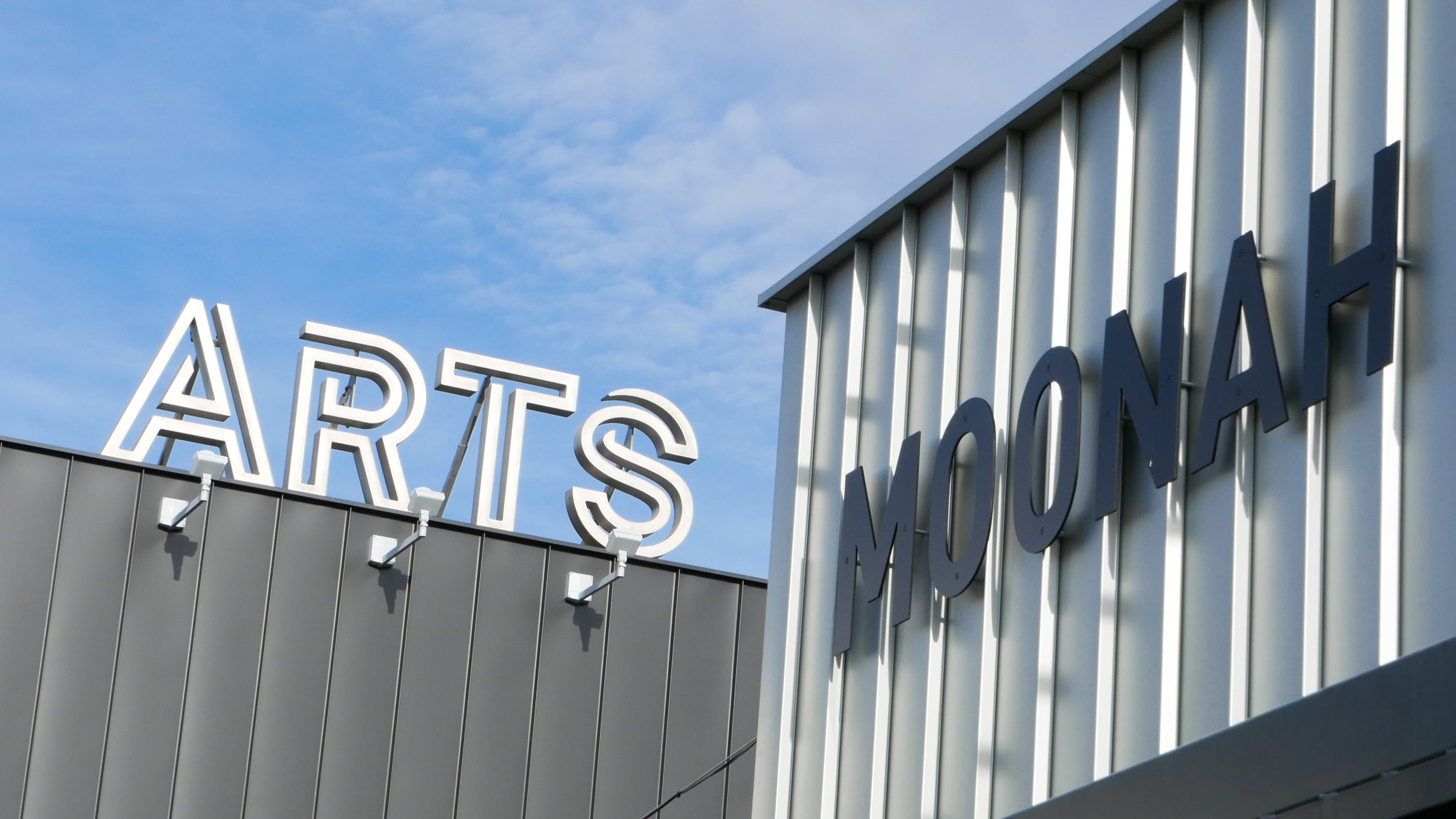
- Moonah Arts Centre signage

- Coordinates: 42°50′35″S 147°18′7″E
- Population: 5,421 (2016 census)
- Postcode(s): 7009
- Location: 3 km (2 mi) SE of Glenorchy
- LGA(s): City of Glenorchy
- Region: Hobart
- State electorate(s): Clark
- Federal division(s): Clark
Suburbs around Moonah:
Derwent Park	Derwent Park	Lutana
West Moonah	Moonah	Lutana
West Moonah	New Town	New Town

Moonah is a residential locality in the local government area (LGA) of Glenorchy in the Hobart LGA region of Tasmania. The locality is about 3 kilometres (1.9 mi) south-east of the town of Glenorchy. The 2016 census recorded a population of 5421 for the state suburb of Moonah. It is a suburb in the city of Hobart, located approximately 5 km north of the central business district of Hobart, and lying directly north of the inner city suburb New Town.

== History ==
Moonah was gazetted as a locality in 1961. The name has been in use since 1895. It is believed to be an Aboriginal word for "gum tree".

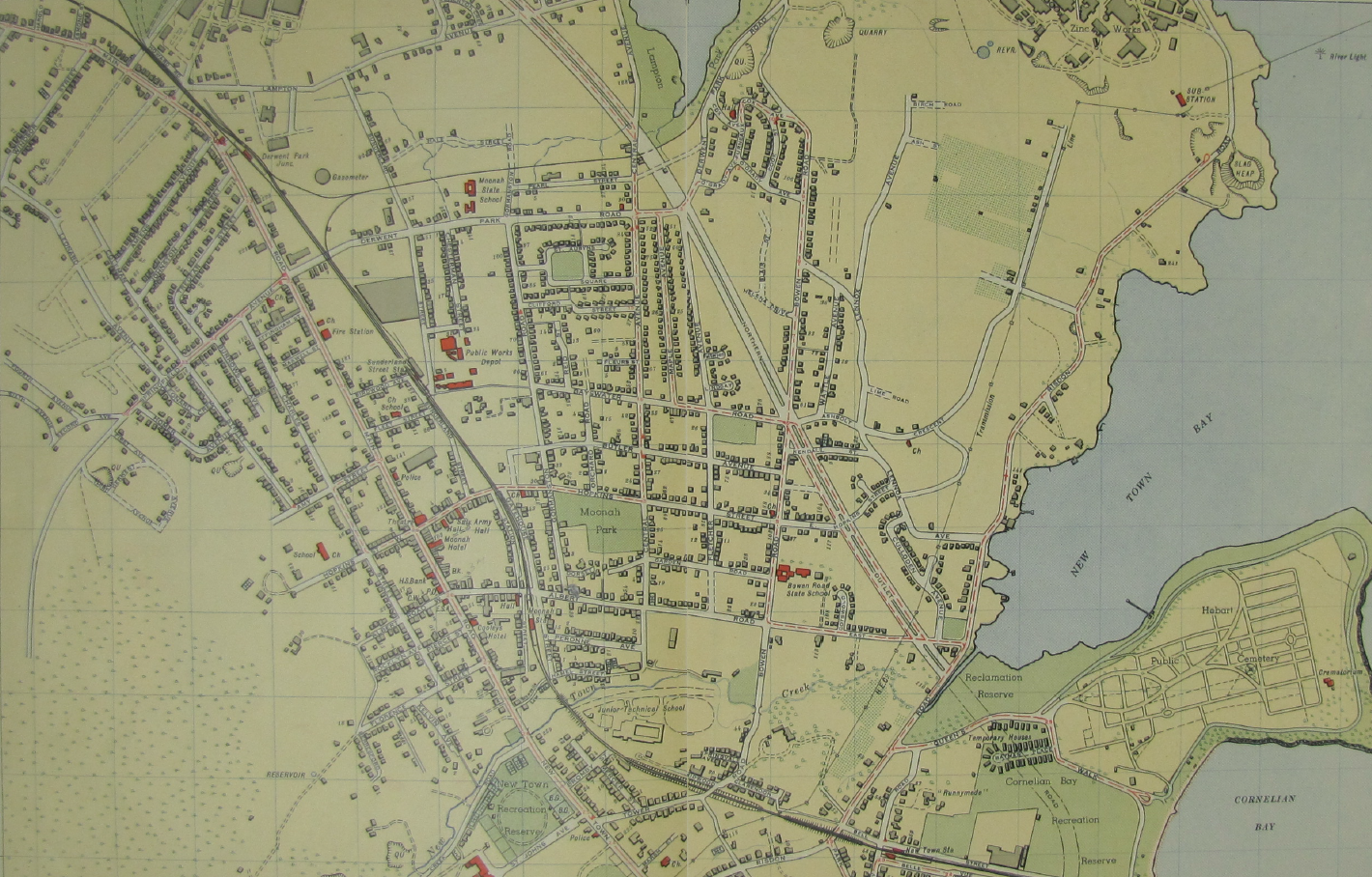
West Moonah and Moonah in 1954

Originally land given free to settlers along the banks of the New Town Rivulet, this area eventually became known as the suburbs of New Town and Moonah.

== Geography ==
New Town Rivulet forms most of the southern boundary.

== Road infrastructure ==
National Route 1 (Brooker Highway) passes along the eastern boundary, from where several roads provide access to the locality.

== Today ==
The key transport axis of the suburb is Main Road, which runs between Derwent Park to the north and New Town to the south. Metro Tasmania routes run along this corridor – formerly a tram route – with several stops in Moonah.

The Moonah shopping district is located largely between Florence Street and Amy Street, and includes a range of retail shops, restaurants and cafes, offices, banks, service stations, a newsagent, an auction house and a post office.

Large areas of the suburb are residential. Industrial zones are found along Charles St, Sunderland St and Gormanston Rd. Moonah is home to a major office of the state water company TasWater.

Glenorchy City Council's Moonah Arts Centre opened in 2015 and hosts exhibitions, events and classes.

== Smelter contamination ==
The Risdon Zinc Works (trading as Nyrstar Hobart) at nearby Lutana, which has been in operation since 1917, continues to produce heavy metal contaminants affecting the air, land and estuary waters surrounding Greater Hobart.

Drawing from data complied in the National Pollutant Inventory, a report by the Australian Conservation Foundation placed Hobart at number 6 of Australia's most polluted cities in 2018. The data identified medium levels of air pollution in postcodes 7009 (Moonah, Lutana, Derwent Park, West Moonah) and 7010 (Glenorchy, Rosetta, Montrose, Goodwood, Dowsing Point) with average air contaminate readings of 40% NO_{x} (nitric oxide (NO) and nitrogen dioxide (NO_{2})), and sulfur dioxide (SO_{2}) contributing 57% of airborne emissions.

The Tasmanian Planning Scheme does not require the Glenorchy City Council to notify prospective buyers about potential land contamination within the City of Glenorchy.
