= Derwent Park, Tasmania =

Derwent Park
- Suburb
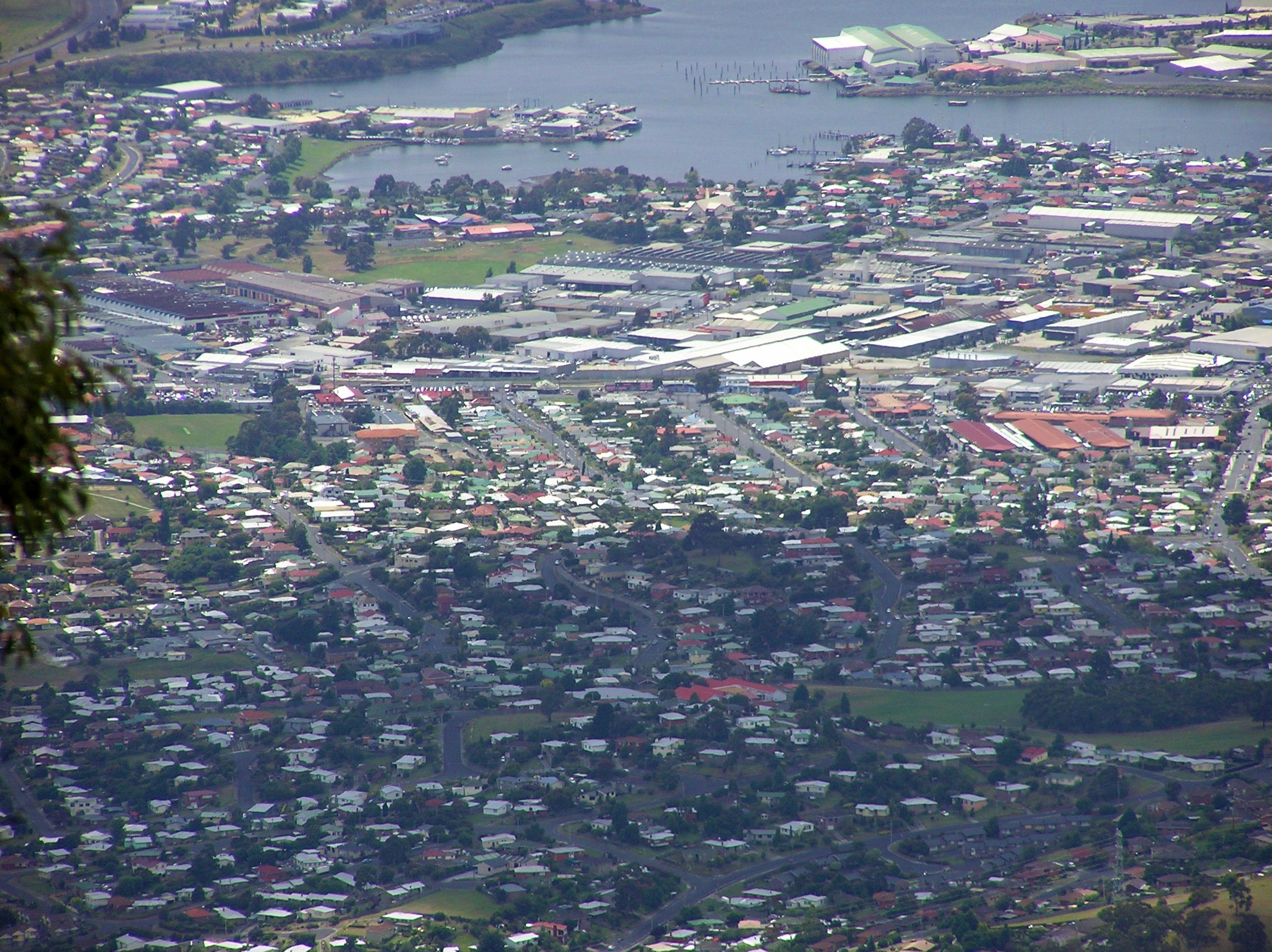
- View of Derwent Park from the west with Prince of Wales Bay behind and Springfield in the foreground

- Interactive map of Derwent Park
- Coordinates: 42°50′7″S 147°17′27″E
- Country: Australia
- State: Tasmania
- Region: Hobart
- City: Hobart
- LGA: City of Glenorchy
- Location: 2 km (1.2 mi) E of Glenorchy

Government
  - State electorate: Clark
  - Federal division: Clark

Population
  - Total: 872 (2021 census)
- Postcode: 7009
Suburbs around Derwent Park
Glenorchy	Goodwood	Prince of Wales Bay
West Moonah	Derwent Park	Lutana
West Moonah	Moonah	Moonah

Derwent Park is a residential locality in the local government area (LGA) of Glenorchy in the Hobart LGA region of Tasmania. The locality is about 2 kilometres (1.2 mi) east of the town of Glenorchy. The 2021 census recorded a population of 872 for the state suburb of Derwent Park. It is a suburb of Hobart.

Derwent Park is predominantly a light commercial and industrial area, historically and contemporarily home to major manufacturing industries.

== History ==
Derwent Park was gazetted as a locality in 1961. The name is derived from a property established in the area about 1820.

== Industry and Manufacturing ==
Derwent Park has played a significant role in Tasmania’s manufacturing sector. The area was historically home to the Small Arms Ammunition Factory's Ammunition Factory Derwent Park, Sanitarium Health Foods, and Sheridan, a textile manufacturer producing high-quality bedding and home textiles. Sheridan operated in Derwent Park for several decades, contributing to the local economy and employment.

In contemporary times, Derwent Park remains a hub for industrial activities. The shipbuilder Incat operates at Prince of Wales Bay, adjacent to Derwent Park, and is globally recognised for its innovative wave-piercing catamarans. The company has built high-speed ferries and naval vessels that serve international and domestic markets, cementing Tasmania’s reputation as a leader in maritime engineering.

Other significant industrial operations in the area include advanced manufacturing, food processing, and logistics businesses that continue to support employment and economic growth.

=== Smelter contamination ===
The Risdon Zinc Works (trading as Nyrstar Hobart) at nearby Lutana, which has been in operation since 1917, continues to produce heavy metal contaminants affecting the air, land and estuary waters surrounding Greater Hobart.

Drawing from data compiled in the National Pollutant Inventory, a report by the Australian Conservation Foundation placed Hobart at number six among Australia's most polluted cities in 2018. The data identified medium levels of air pollution in postcodes 7009 (Derwent Park, Lutana, Moonah, West Moonah) and 7010 (Glenorchy, Rosetta, Montrose, Goodwood, Dowsing Point) with average air contaminant readings of 40% NO_{x} (nitric oxide (NO) and nitrogen dioxide (NO_{2})), and sulfur dioxide (SO_{2}) contributing 57% of airborne emissions.

== Geography ==
The waters of the River Derwent and Prince of Wales Bay form the northern boundary.

== Road infrastructure ==
National Route 1 (Brooker Highway) runs through from north-west to south-east.
