= Prince of Wales Bay =

Bay in Hobart, Tasmania, Australia

Coordinates: 42°49′33″S 147°18′15″E

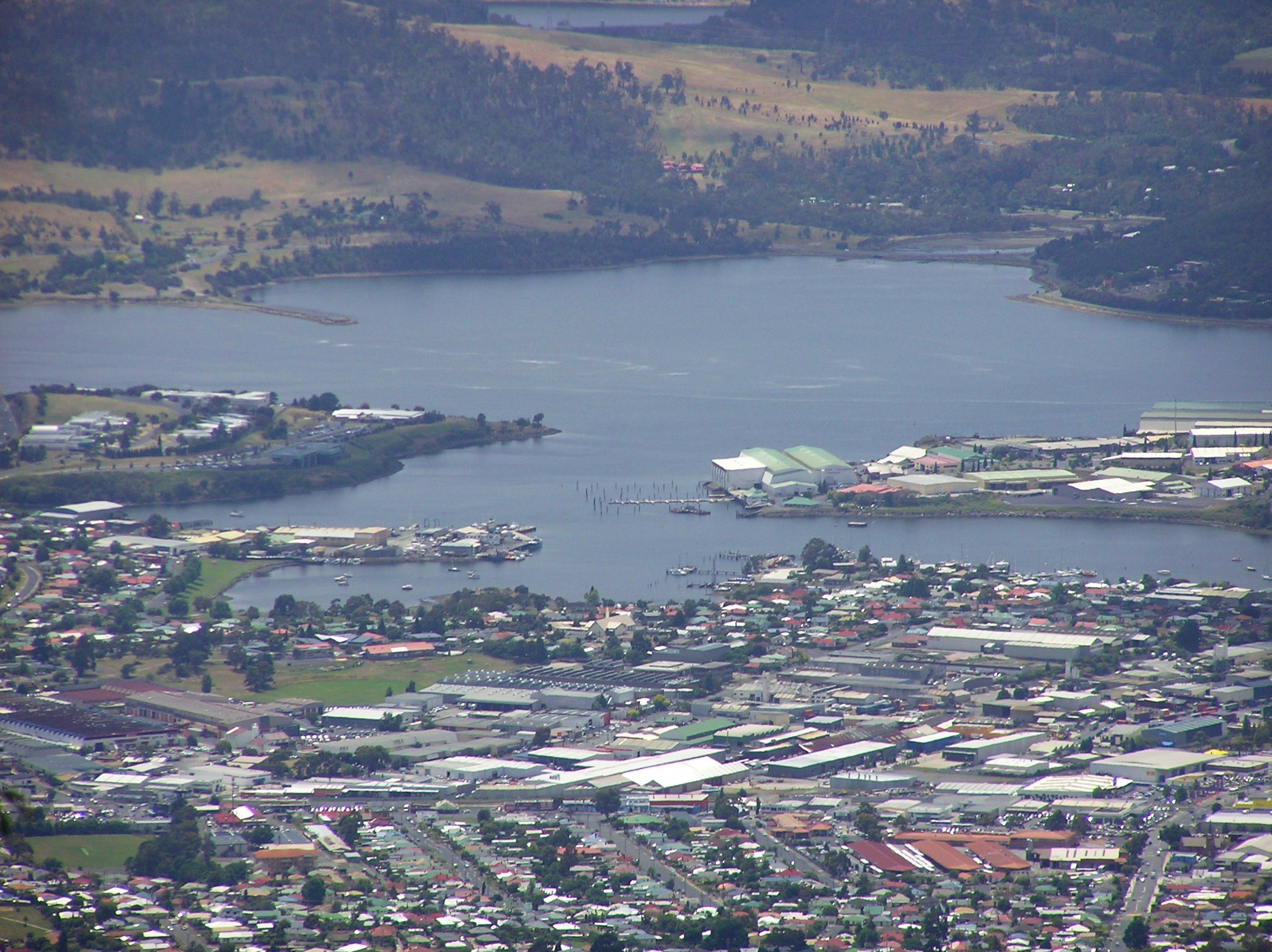
Prince of Wales Bay viewed from Lost World

Prince of Wales Bay is located on the western shore of the River Derwent in southern Tasmania, Australia.

It is between the suburbs of Dowsing Point, Goodwood and Lutana.

The area is home to two public parks, Giblin Reserve and Prince of Wales Bay Reserve. It is also home to a softball/baseball ground and hockey courts.

It was the site of the first military encampment in Hobart.

Like its neighbouring suburb, Derwent Park, Prince of Wales Bay is home to light industry, and contains few houses. It is also the location of catamaran construction company Incat.
