= List of Hobart suburbs =

This is a list of suburbs of Hobart, Tasmania, Australia.

Municipality of Brighton:

- Bridgewater
  - Green Point
- Gagebrook
- Herdsmans Cove
- Old Beach
- Brighton

Municipality of Kingborough:

- Blackmans Bay
- Bonnet Hill
- Howden
- Huntingfield
- Kingston
  - Firthside
  - Maranoa Heights
- Kingston Beach
- Taroona

Municipality of Sorell:

- Midway Point
- Sorell
- Dodges Ferry

City of Clarence:

- Acton Park
- Bellerive
- Cambridge
- Clarendon Vale
- Geilston Bay
- Howrah
- Lauderdale
  - includes Seven Mile Beach
- Lindisfarne
  - Flagstaff Gully
- Montagu Bay
- Mornington
- Mount Rumney
- Oakdowns
- Otago
- Risdon
- Risdon Vale
- Roches Beach
- Rokeby
- Rose Bay
- Rosny
- Rosny Park
- Tranmere
- Warrane

City of Glenorchy:

- Austins Ferry
- Berriedale
- Chigwell
- Claremont
  - Abbotsfield
- Collinsvale
- Derwent Park
- Dowsing Point
- Glenlusk
- Glenorchy
  - includes Elwick
  - Merton
- Goodwood
- Granton
- Lutana
- Montrose
- Moonah
- Rosetta
- West Moonah

City of Hobart:

- Battery Point
- Dynnyrne
- Fern Tree
- Glebe
- Hobart
- Lenah Valley
- Mount Nelson
- Mount Stuart
- New Town
  - Cornelian Bay
- North Hobart
- Ridgeway
- Sandy Bay
  - includes Lower Sandy Bay
- South Hobart
  - Cascades
- Tolmans Hill
- West Hobart

== See also ==
- List of localities in Tasmania
- Local Government Areas of Tasmania
