= Lutana =

- Suburb
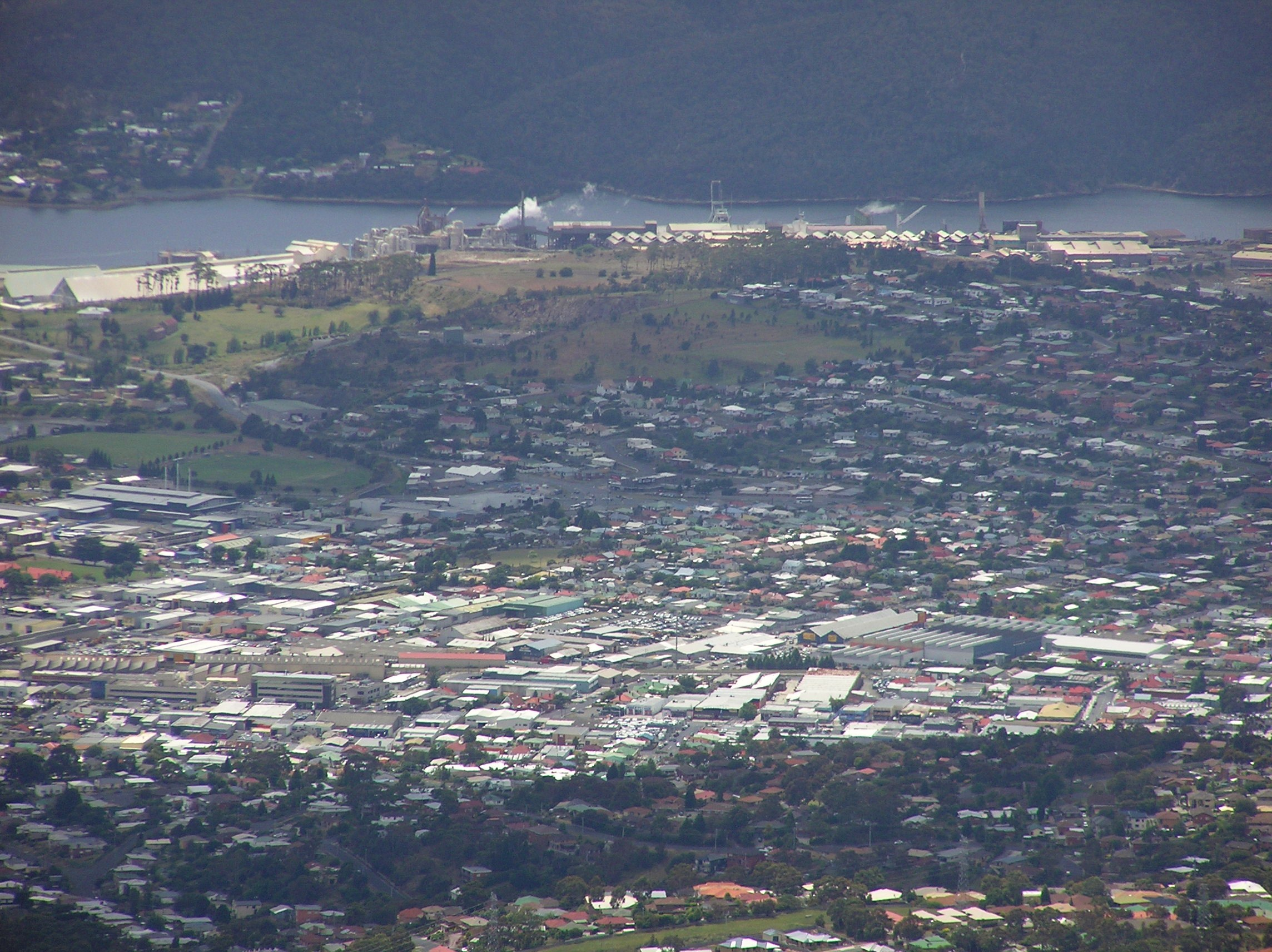
- Lutana is behind Moonah in this view from the west from Lost World.

- Interactive map of Lutana
- Coordinates: 42°50′28″S 147°18′34″E
- Country: Australia
- State: Tasmania
- Region: Hobart
- City: Hobart
- LGA: City of Glenorchy
- Location: 3 km (1.9 mi) SE of Glenorchy

Government
  - State electorate: Clark
  - Federal division: Clark

Population
  - Total: 2,616 (2021 census)
- Postcode: 7009
Suburbs around Lutana
Derwent Park	Prince of Wales Bay	River Derwent
Moonah	Lutana	River Derwent
New Town	New Town	New Town Bay

Lutana /luːˈtɑːnə/ loo-TAH-nə is a residential suburb of Greater Hobart in Tasmania, Australia. It is part of the City of Glenorchy local government area (LGA) and is located about 3 kilometres (1.9 mi) south-east of Glenorchy. At the 2021 census, Lutana had a population of 2,616. The suburb lies between the Brooker Highway and the western shore of the River Derwent.

== History ==
The suburb developed in association with the Risdon Zinc Works, established in 1916 by the Electrolytic Zinc Company of Australasia (EZ), part of the Collins House Group of Anglo-Australian mining and metallurgical firms. To attract and retain workers, EZ implemented an industrial welfare scheme that included the construction of a housing village on land at Risdon and Bowen Road. Planned in consultation with Melbourne architect Walter Butler, the development was inspired by garden city principles and featured around 60 poured-concrete houses in the Arts and Crafts style, together with weatherboard and brick dwellings. Streets such as Cook Street, Cox, Furneaux and O’Grady Avenues retain some of these houses, which are regarded as rare examples of early twentieth-century company housing in Australia.

Originally named Risdon Rise, the area was renamed following a 1920 competition run by the Electrolytic Zinc Company, with Lutana, a Palawa (Tasmanian Aboriginal) word meaning "moon", selected as the winning entry.

Intended as a model village with up to 200 houses, the scheme was eventually reduced in scale by company directors due to costs. Although a community hall followed in 1923, the village was not universally embraced by workers, who viewed it as remote and the housing as expensive. EZ's subsidised rail services enabled many to live further from the works.

In the early 1950s, a separate enclave known as "Drip Village" was built at the southern end of Lutana on New Town Bay to accommodate zinc works managers. Located on Lallaby Road, Risdon Road and Turanna Street, the houses were often designed in the Art Deco style and finished with stucco concrete. The nickname "drip" referred to the projecting edges designed to divert water away from stucco surfaces.

The suburb was gazetted as a locality in 1961. Since then Lutana has continued to grow as an inner-urban residential area, with a mixture of older worker housing, townhouses and apartments.

== Amenities ==
Lutana contains several community parks and recreational spaces. Apex Park, the Athol Street Playground and Lutana Woodlands Reserve provide local play facilities and open space.

The suburb also adjoins the New Town Bay Golf Club, a private nine-hole metropolitan golf course situated on the banks of New Town Bay and the River Derwent.

== Geography ==
The suburb consists largely of Store Point, with its eastern boundary following the shores of New Town Bay and the River Derwent. To the northwest it is bound by Derwent Park Road and the Brooker Highway.

== Geology ==
Store Point and the adjoining foreshore at Lutana are underlain by fine-to medium-grained dolerite. On the foreshore, wave action has opened minor thermal joints, giving the rock a shattered appearance, but these are expected to tighten within about a metre of depth. Few major joints are visible and no preferred orientation has been observed, suggesting that shallow excavation would reveal fresh, massive rock with only rare weathered zones.

Inland exposures are more variable, with some zones of weathering extending up to 5 metres (16 ft). Detailed site investigations, including magnetic and seismic surveys, have been recommended to identify the most suitable near-surface rock for construction purposes.

=== Heavy metal contamination ===
The Risdon Zinc Works, operating since 1917 and now managed by Nyrstar Hobart, has contributed to heavy metal contamination affecting air, land and estuarine waters around Greater Hobart.

Soil sampling conducted from the 1980s onwards in Lutana and neighbouring suburbs detected elevated concentrations of zinc, lead and cadmium. Distribution patterns were influenced by wind direction, local topography and proximity to the smelter. Studies in the 1990s found contamination concentrated in the upper 20 millimetres (0.79 in) of soil.

A 2009 CSIRO report advised that certain home-grown vegetables vulnerable to heavy metal uptake, such as lettuce, spinach, carrot and beetroot, should be cultivated in raised garden beds containing at least 30 centimetres (12 in) of clean soil.

Based on National Pollutant Inventory data, the Australian Conservation Foundation ranked Hobart sixth among Australia's most polluted cities in 2018. The report highlighted medium levels of air pollution in postcodes 7009, 7010 and 7015, with nitrogen oxides contributing 40% and sulfur dioxide 57% of airborne emissions.

The Tasmanian Planning Scheme does not require Glenorchy City Council to notify prospective buyers of potential land contamination in Lutana.

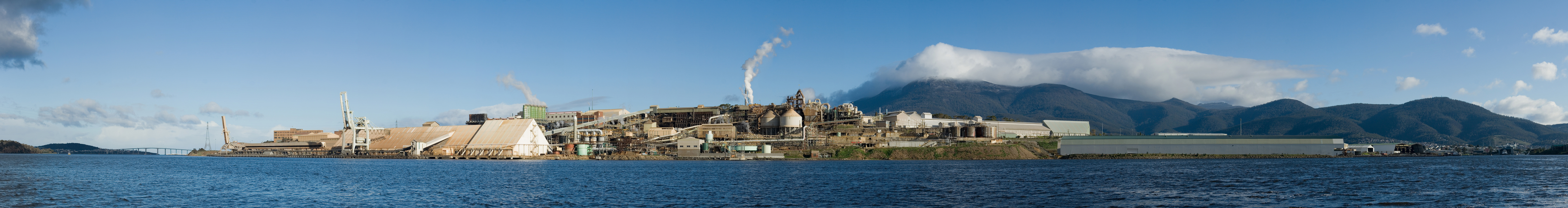
Store Point panorama. The zinc works at Lutana is the largest exporter in Tasmania, generating about 2.5% of the state's GDP. It produces over 280,000 tonnes of zinc annually.

== Rail transport ==
From 1919 until the cessation of Hobart's suburban services in 1974, Lutana was served by the Risdon and Abbatoirs branch lines, both spur lines connecting to the North–South Line. The suburb contained the only passenger station on the line, with additional facilities located at Risdon station near the zinc works.

One of the most notable commuter services was the early morning train from Hobart to Risdon, popularly known as the "Big Zinc". This service regularly carried large numbers of zinc works employees and was regarded as one of the busiest on the Tasmanian Government Railways network.

Following the closure of the line, the former rail corridor has been intermittently proposed as a site for an active transport link between Lutana, Derwent Park and the Intercity Cycleway. Known variously as the "Lutana Link" or "Zinc Link", the project has been promoted by community groups and included in several transport and cycling strategies since 2009. Proposals have focused on converting the disused spur into a safe walking and cycling route, providing connections to schools, shops and workplaces without the need to cross the Brooker Highway.

Despite recurring support, the project has faced delays. In 2022 Glenorchy City Council moved the scheme from its capital works plan to its Projects Register due to uncertainty over costs associated with maintaining or replacing the old bridge over the Brooker Highway. As of 2025, the link remains unbuilt.

== Road infrastructure ==
National Route 1 (Brooker Highway) runs along the suburb's south-western edge, with local roads providing access to residential areas.

== Sources ==
- Annual Plan 2025/26 – 2028/29 (PDF) (Report). Glenorchy City Council. June 2025.
- Barton, Ruth (2 November 2020). "'Communal life, common interests and healthy conditions': industrial welfarism at Electrolytic Zinc, Hobart 1918-27". History Cooperative.
