= Division of Clark =

Australian federal electoral division

Coordinates: 42.888°S 147.244°E

Clark Australian House of Representatives Division
- Interactive map of boundaries since the 2019 federal election
- Created: 2019
- MP: Andrew Wilkie
- Party: Independent
- Namesake: Andrew Inglis Clark
- Electors: 74,797 (2022)
- Area: 292 km^{2} (112.7 sq mi)
- Demographic: Inner metropolitan
- State electorate: Clark
Electorates around Clark:
Lyons	Lyons	Lyons
Lyons; Franklin	Clark	Storm Bay
Franklin	Franklin	Storm Bay

The Division of Clark is an Australian Electoral Division in the state of Tasmania, first contested at the 2019 federal election.

The division covers the central Hobart area as well as kunanyi / Mount Wellington, a prominent physical feature in the division's west. Taking effect at the next general election, the division will be expanded to cover most of southern Tasmania and will become the southernmost division in Australia and Tasmania. It will also cover Macquarie Island and part of the Tasmanian Wilderness World Heritage Area , neither of which have permanent populations.

== Geography ==
Federal electoral division boundaries in Australia are determined at redistributions by a redistribution committee appointed by the Australian Electoral Commission. Redistributions occur for the boundaries of divisions in a particular state, and they occur every seven years, or sooner if a state's representation entitlement changes or when divisions of a state are malapportioned.

When the division replaced Division of Denison in the 2017 redistribution, it was located in central Hobart on the western shore of the River Derwent and incorporated the cities of Hobart and Glenorchy, together with the northern parts of Kingborough Council, including Taroona, generally north of the Huon Highway. In the 2026 redistribution, the division was significantly expanded in area towards the south-west by gaining all areas of Division of Franklin west of the River Derwent. This included the Huon Valley and the remainder of the Kingborough local government areas, as well as the Macquarie Island. However, it lost the City of Glenorchy to the Division of Lyons.

Taking effect at the next general election, it will cover the entire local government areas of Hobart, Kingborough and Huon Valley, as well as Macquarie Island.

== History ==
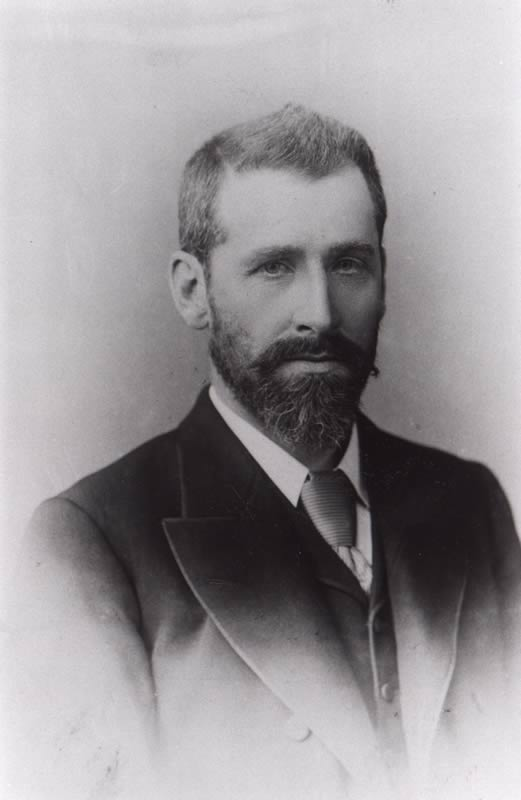
Andrew Inglis Clark, the division's namesake

The division is named in honour of Andrew Inglis Clark, the principal author of the Australian Constitution who was briefly Tasmanian Opposition Leader.

The Division of Clark replaced the seat of Denison during a redistribution process overseen by the Australian Electoral Commission in 2017. It was renamed because Denison was against the democratisation of Tasmania and supported further convict transportation, whereas Clark both helped write the Australian constitution and helped establish the Tasmanian Hare–Clark electoral system which is named in his honour.

== Members ==
Image	Member	Party	Term	Notes
	Andrew Wilkie (1961–)	Independent	18 May 2019 – present	Previously held the Division of Denison. Incumbent

== Election results ==
2025 Australian federal election: Clark
Party	Candidate	Votes	%	±%
Independent	Andrew Wilkie	33,011	48.88	+3.34
Labor	Heidi Heck	13,539	20.05	+1.29
Liberal	Marilena Di Florio	9,239	13.68	−2.17
Greens	Janet Shelley	8,908	13.19	−0.26
One Nation	Cathy Griggs	2,834	4.20	+1.60
Total formal votes		67,531	97.58	+1.83
Informal votes		1,677	2.42	−1.83
Turnout		69,208	93.14	+1.01
Notional two-party-preferred count
Labor	Heidi Heck	47,871	70.89	+3.65
Liberal	Marilena Di Florio	19,660	29.11	−3.65
Two-candidate-preferred result
Independent	Andrew Wilkie	47,531	70.38	−0.44
Labor	Heidi Heck	20,000	29.62	+0.44
Independent hold		Swing	−0.44	
