= National Pollutant Inventory =

Australian emissions database

The National Pollutant Inventory (NPI) is a database of Australian pollution emissions managed by the Australian Commonwealth, State and Territory Governments. A condensed version of the information collected is available to the public via the Department’s website .

== Emissions ==
The NPI records and makes publicly available the emissions from industrial facilities and diffuse sources of 93 different chemical substances to air, land and water.

== Objectives ==
The objectives of the NPI are to:

- Assist industry and government with environmental planning and management;
- Provide the community with up to date information about pollutant emissions from industrial facilities; and
- Promote waste minimisation, cleaner production, eco-efficiency and energy and resource efficiency.

== Sources of data ==
Australian industrial facilities that use certain amounts of the 93 NPI substances must estimate and report their emissions directly to their state or territory environment agency annually. The state and territory environment agencies review all NPI reports for accuracy and forward the data to the Australian Government. The reports are then displayed on the NPI public website

== Exemptions ==
The following industrial activities are exempt from the NPI's mandatory reporting requirements:

- Mobile emission sources (for example, an aircraft in flight or a ship at sea) operating outside the boundaries of a fixed facility
- Petrol stations
- Dry cleaners which employ less than 20 people
- Scrap metal handling facilities that do not reprocess batteries or engage in metal smelting
- Agricultural production facilities, including the growing of trees, aquaculture, horticulture or livestock raising unless it involves intensive livestock production (for example, a piggery, poultry farm or a cattle feedlot) or processing agricultural produce.

During a review of the NPI undertaken in 2005, it was suggested that two industries have their exemptions lifted. They were aquaculture, and crematoria. Reasons given were for their discharges of nutrient to the sea, and mercury to the atmosphere respectively. In 2007, Environment Ministers voted against the lifting of the reporting exemption for aquaculture, despite the review receiving 12 submissions supporting the recommendation, and 5 opposing it.

=== Aquaculture in Spencer Gulf ===
This omission of the aquaculture industry from mandatory reporting is significant for Spencer Gulf, South Australia. In this region, southern bluefin tuna and yellowtail kingfish sea-cage aquaculture are the two largest industrial contributors of nitrogenous nutrient pollution to the marine environment. The Spencer Gulf is particularly vulnerable to impacts because its water exchange with the ocean is constrained and the waters are naturally very low in nutrients by world standards. The existing marine communities have evolved to these unique circumstances, and are therefore particularly susceptible to changes in their environment. Iconic marine species of the region include the giant Australian cuttlefish and the little penguin, both of which are in decline.

== Substances reported ==
- 1,1,1,2-Tetrachloroethane
- 1,1,2-Trichloroethane
- 1,2-Dibromoethane
- 1,2-Dichloroethane
- 1,3-Butadiene (vinyl ethylene)
- 2-Ethoxyethanol acetate
- 2-Ethoxyethanol
- 2-Methoxyethanol acetate
- 2-Methoxyethanol
- 4,4'-Methylene-bis(2-chloroaniline)
- Acetaldehyde
- Acetic acid (ethanoic acid)
- Acetone
- Acetonitrile
- Acrolein
- Acrylamide
- Acrylic acid
- Acrylonitrile (2-propenenitrile)
- Ammonia (total)
- Aniline (benzenamine)
- Antimony & compounds
- Arsenic & compounds
- Benzene
- Benzene hexachloro- (HCB)
- Beryllium & compounds
- Biphenyl (1,1-biphenyl)
- Boron & compounds
- Cadmium & compounds
- Carbon disulfide
- Carbon monoxide
- Chlorine dioxide
- Chlorine & compounds
- Chloroethane (ethyl chloride)
- Chloroform (trichloromethane)
- Chlorophenols (di, tri, tetra)
- Chromium (tri)
- Chromium (hexa)
- Cobalt & compounds
- Copper & compounds
- Cumene (1-methylethylbenzene)
- Cyanide (inorganic) compounds
- Cyclohexane
- Di(2-ethylhexyl) phthalate (DEHP)
- Dibutyl phthalate
- Dichloromethane
- Ethanol
- Ethyl acetate
- Ethyl butyl ketone
- Ethylbenzene
- Ethylene glycol (1,2-ethanediol)
- Ethylene oxide
- Fluoride compounds
- Formaldehyde (methyl aldehyde)
- Glutaraldehyde
- Hydrochloric acid
- Hydrogen sulfide
- Lead & compounds
- Magnesium oxide
- Manganese & compounds
- Mercury & compounds
- Methanol
- Methylene diphenyl diisocyanate
- Methyl ethyl ketone
- Methyl isobutyl ketone
- Methyl methacrylate
- n-Hexane
- Nickel carbonyl
- Nickel subsulfide
- Nickel & compounds
- Nitric acid
- Organo-tin
- Oxides of nitrogen
- Particulate Matter <2.5 μm PM2.5
- Particulate Matter <10 μm PM10
- Phenol
- Phosphoric acid
- Phosphorus
- Polychlorinated Biphenyls
- Polychlorinated dioxins and furans
- Polycyclic aromatic hydrocarbons
- Selenium & compounds
- Styrene (ethenylbenzene)
- Sulfur dioxide
- Sulfuric acid
- Tetrachloroethylene
- Toluene (methylbenzene)
- Toluene-2,4-diisocyanate
- Total Nitrogen
- Total Phosphorus
- Total Volatile Organic Compounds
- Trichloroethylene
- Vinyl Chloride Monomer
- Xylenes (individual or mixed isomers)
- Zinc & compounds
