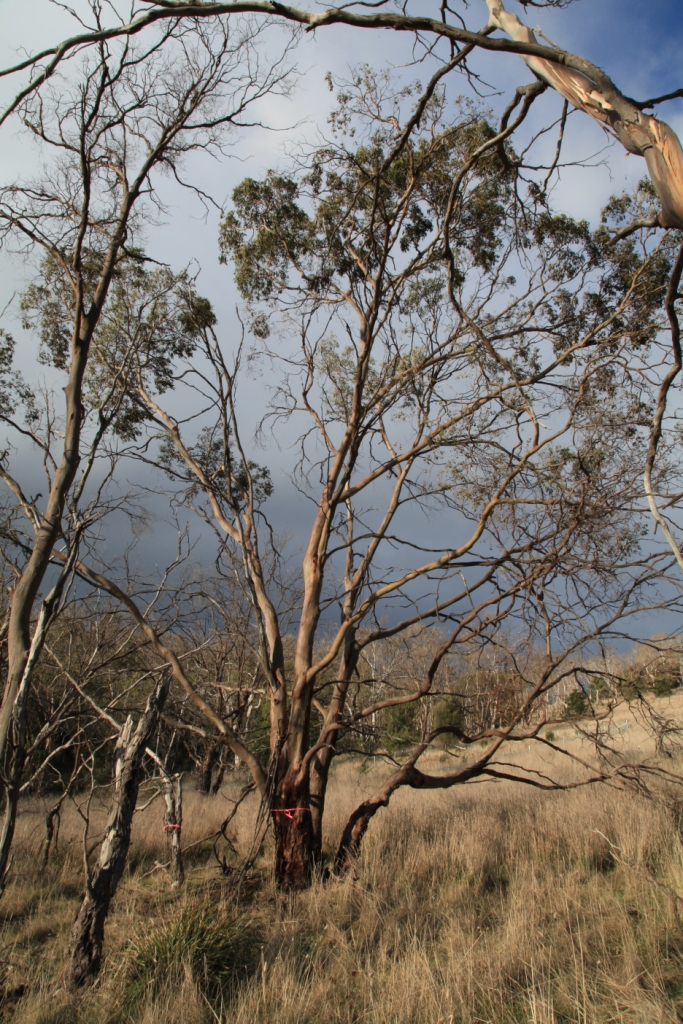
- Eucalyptus morrisbyi in Calverts Hill Nature Reserve, near Sandford

Conservation status
- Critically Endangered (IUCN 3.1)

- Endangered (EPBC Act)

Scientific classification
- Kingdom: Plantae
- Clade: Tracheophytes
- Clade: Angiosperms
- Clade: Eudicots
- Clade: Rosids
- Order: Myrtales
- Family: Myrtaceae
- Genus: Eucalyptus
- Species: E. morrisbyi

Binomial name
- Eucalyptus morrisbyi Brett

= Eucalyptus morrisbyi =

Morrisby's gum

Species of eucalyptus

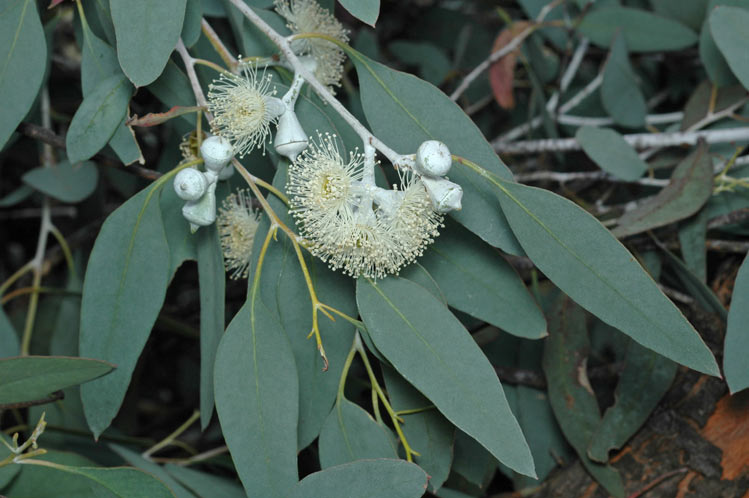
Leaves, flower buds and flowers

Eucalyptus morrisbyi, commonly known as Morrisby's gum, is a species of small to medium-sized tree that is endemic to a restricted area of Tasmania. It has loose slabs of rough bark near the base of its trunk, smooth pale grey bark above, lance-shaped to egg-shaped adult leaves, flower buds in groups of three, white flowers and barrel-shaped or cylindrical fruit. It is only known in the wild from a few small populations but has been widely planted as an ornamental.

== Description ==
Eucalyptus morrisbyi is a tree that typically grows to a height of 6–16 m (20–52 ft) and forms a lignotuber. It has smooth, pale greyish, or brown bark, often with slabs of loose rough bark near the base of the trunk. Young plants and coppice regrowth have more or less round, sessile leaves that are glaucous, 10–45 mm (0.39–1.77 in) long, 15–40 mm (0.59–1.57 in) wide arranged in opposite pairs and with usually wavy edges. Adult leaves are lance-shaped to egg-shaped or elliptical, the same shade of dull bluish green to glaucous on both sides, 47–100 mm (1.9–3.9 in) long and 15–40 mm (0.59–1.57 in) wide, tapering to a petiole 9–25 mm (0.35–0.98 in) long. The flower buds are arranged in groups of three in leaf axils on an unbranched peduncle 4–10 mm (0.16–0.39 in) long, the individual buds sessile or on pedicels up to 5 mm (0.20 in) long. Mature buds are pear-shaped to oval, 7–8 mm (0.28–0.31 in) long and 5–6 mm (0.20–0.24 in) wide with a conical to beaked operculum. Flowering occurs in most months, peaking from January to April, and the flowers are white. The fruit is a woody barrel-shaped or cylindrical capsule 6–9 mm (0.24–0.35 in) long and 7–8 mm (0.28–0.31 in) wide with the valves below rim level.

== Taxonomy and naming ==
Eucalyptus morrisbyi was first formally described in 1939 by Robert Brett in Papers and Proceedings of the Royal Society of Tasmania. Brett did not give a reason for the specific epithet (morrisbyi) but noted that "J. R. Morrisby" had planted an avenue of this species. John Robert Morrisby (1832–1923) gathered seed of the species and planted the species on a farm near Sandford that was still the home of a Morrisby family in 1978.

Eucalyptus morrisbyi belongs in the subgenus Symphyomyrtus, section Maidenaria, section Orbiculares.

== Distribution and habitat ==
Morrisby's gum grows in dry woodland, mostly in gullies between hilly slopes, and mostly in relatively pure stands. It is only known from the wild in the Cremorne area, in two populations on the eastern shore of the River Derwent.

== Conservation status ==
This eucalypt is unlikely to go extinct because of ornamental plantings, but there is a continuing decline in wild populations. The species is listed as "endangered" under the Australian Federal Government Environment Protection and Biodiversity Conservation Act 1999 and the Tasmanian Government Threatened Species Protection Act 1995. The IUCN Red List assesses the species as Critically Endangered. The total population is estimated to number fewer than 2,500 mature plants in no more than five locations. The main threats to the species in the wild include land clearing, climate change, browsing by mammals such as possums, insect browsing, especially by the autumn gum moth (Mnesampela privata), competition, including by the native vine, Cassytha pubescens and introduced weeds including serrated tussock (Nassella trichotoma) and inappropriate fire regimes.

== See also ==
- List of Eucalyptus species
