= Montagu Bay =

- Suburb
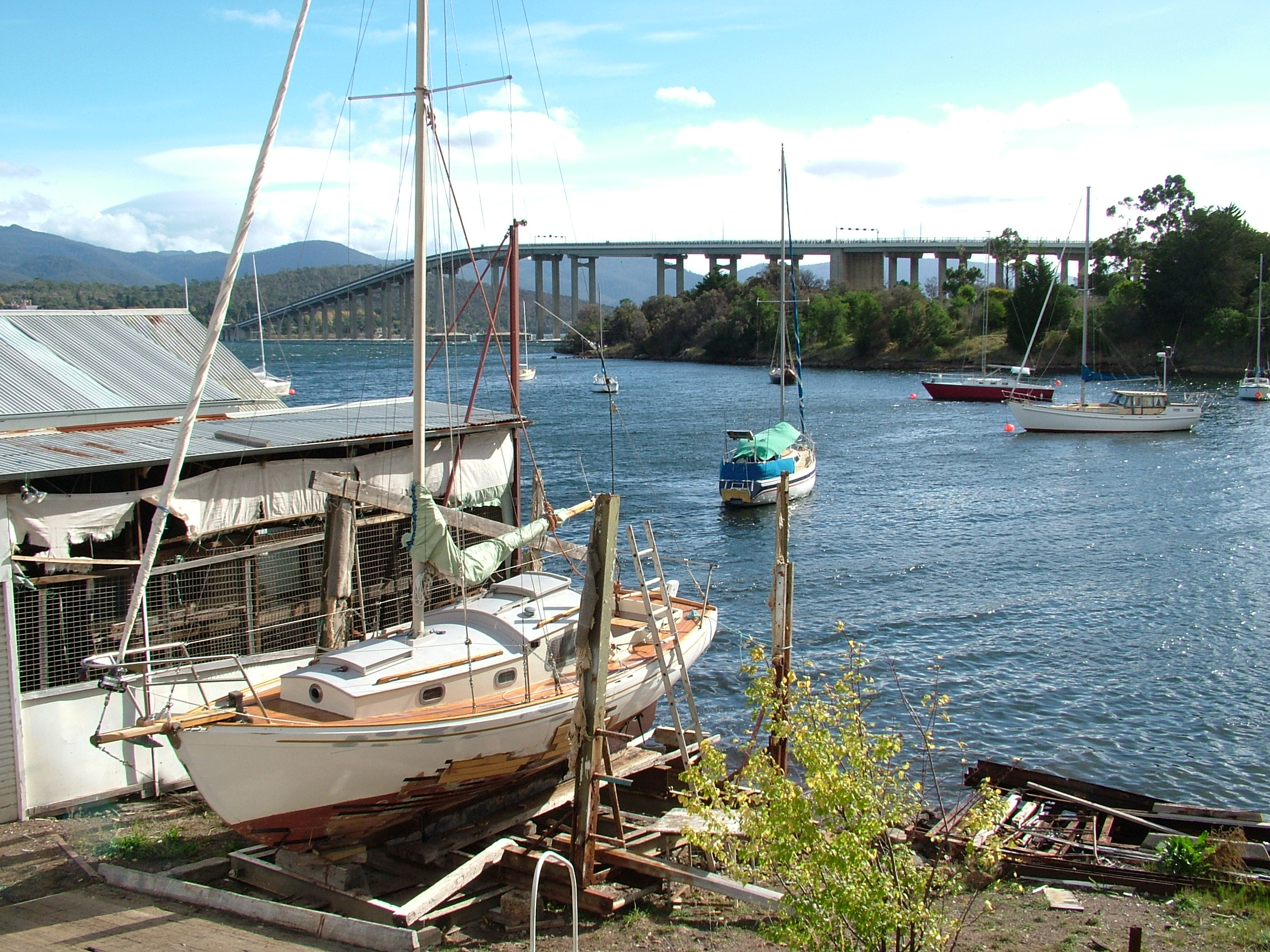
- Montagu Bay, looking towards the Tasman Bridge

- Interactive map of Montagu Bay
- Coordinates: 42°51′49″S 147°21′21″E
- Country: Australia
- State: Tasmania
- City: Hobart
- LGA: Clarence
- Location: 6 km (3.7 mi) E of Hobart

Government
  - State electorate: Franklin
  - Federal division: Franklin
- Elevation: 5 m (16 ft)

Population
  - Total: 718 (SAL 2021)
- Postcode: 7018
Suburbs around Montagu Bay
River Derwent	Rose Bay	Lindisfarne
(Tasman Bridge)	Montagu Bay	Rosny Park
River Derwent	Rosny	Rosny

Montagu Bay is a suburb of Hobart, Tasmania, Australia on the eastern shore of the River Derwent, four kilometres from the Hobart central business district. It is a small primarily residential suburb located between Rosny, Rose Bay and Lindisfarne and is centred on a small bay of the same name, formerly known as Smelting Works Bay. The bay has a boat ramp and jetty, and is frequently filled with yachts and other vessels at anchor.

== History ==
Montagu Bay and its neighbour Rosny were one of the first areas, along with nearby Bellerive to be settled on the eastern shore of Hobart's River Derwent, starting from the 1820s.

The bay is referred to as "Smelting Works Bay" in the 1877 Tasmanian Gazetteer, and in that year there was a shark attack in the bay. In February 1914 the sale of allotments in "the Smelting Works Bay sub-division of the Rosny Estates" was announced, along with the arrangements for its conversion into a suburb of Hobart". The name originated from a smelting works in the area, managed for some time by early colonist George Whitcomb.

They were attracted by a fresh water creek which ran into the bay, and still exists as an uncovered storm water canal. The name of a nearby street, Loinah Road, is derived from the local Aboriginal dialect word for "drinking place".

The name "Montagu Bay" appears to come from Algernon Montagu, who was an Attorney General and the judge in the fledgling colony. He bought a property of 800 acres (3.2 km^{2}) and house of 14 rooms in the area named Rosny House. It was believed the mansion stood on what is now Balaka Street in Rosny. Rosny House was later known as Montagu House, and was clearly marked on naval charts from 1863.

The Eastern Shore of Hobart was slow to develop in comparison to the areas located immediately around Hobart itself. Rosny and Montagu Bay remained a small settlement for most of the 19th century, and first half of the 20th century. The area really started to grow with the opening of the Hobart Bridge in 1943, which met the eastern shore in Montagu Bay.

The opening of the bridge caused rapid growth in the immediate suburbs, and Montagu Bay experienced a boom in housing, particularly Housing Department houses in the 1940s and 1950s. This growth led to pressure upon the bridge, which was replaced with the higher capacity Tasman Bridge in 1964, which also had its eastern point at Montagu Bay.

Montagu Bay featured in the world's spotlight in early 1975, when the bulk carrier Lake Illawarra crashed into the Tasman Bridge, bringing down a section of the roadway. The disaster response was co-ordinated from Montagu Bay Cricket Oval, as was the rebuilding process.

Since very early in its history, the Royal Hobart Regatta's famous trans-Derwent swim, a river crossing of approximately 1.5 km in incredibly strong currents, has begun from Montagu Bay. The swim was suspended for some years in the 1990s due to high pollution levels in the river, but the race has recently been re-incorporated into the regatta following a decline in the pollution levels.

== Features ==
Montagu Bay is notable for its views of the River Derwent, Tasman Bridge, and Mount Wellington. It is home to Montagu Bay Primary School, and has two large cricket ovals, one next to the school, and another built on landfill in the bay itself. The school is also home to a sculpture of a giant hand carved from pine wood. Another feature is the boat building shed which has existed since the early 1920s. The Eastern shore cycle path travels through Montagu Bay along the shoreline.

Although home to a couple of small independent shops and a hairdresser, the suburb is practically free of commercial services, relying upon nearby Eastlands Shopping Centre at Rosny Park.

Montagu Bay is also home to the Clarence Sports Centre, as well as an Olympic swimming pool, originally known as The Clarence War Memorial Pool, which was built in 1963. It was most famous throughout the 1980s and 1990s for its large white inflatable bubble which covered the pool, turning it into an indoor centre. This probably made the Clarence Pool into Tasmania's Premier Swimming venue during that period. Following the construction of the Hobart Aquatic Centre it was decided by the Clarence City Council to redevelop the venue, and it reopened in 2004 as a superb indoor venue, renamed as the Clarence Aquatic Centre.

The Tasmanian SES has an emergency response headquarters in Montagu Bay, due to the closeness of the Tasman Bridge, and its previous disaster. There is also a Scout Hall, home to the 1st Montagu Bay Scout troop, and Rosny Childcare Centre in Montagu Bay. There is also a cricket team called Montagu Bay Cricket Club, but they generally play their home games in nearby Geilston Bay due to the better facilities there.

There are two churches in Montagu Bay, St. James Anglican church, and a Church of Jesus Christ of Latter-day Saints, as well as a former Fire Station which has been converted into a Buddhist Temple within the suburb. A previous Catholic Church, which also temporarily served as Montagu Bay Primary School, was abandoned and demolished, replaced with housing units.

Montagu Bay is well served by public transport with Metro Tasmania's bus routes 240, 241, 242, 243, 243C, 244, and 245 all passing through the suburb. Most of these travel from Hobart Bus Mall to Rosny Park Transit Mall, although sometimes bus services continue to nearby suburbs of Mornington, Warrane and Tranmere. Other bus services can be accessed by a nearby bus stop on the Tasman Highway.

Montagu Bay, on Hobart's eastern shore, is a not-so-secret spot for seeing bioluminescence.
