= Brendan Blomeley =

Australian politician

Cr Brendan Blomeley

Mayor of Clarence
- In office 27 October 2022 – 29 October 2026
- Deputy: Allison Ritchie
- Preceded by: Doug Chipman
- Succeeded by: Drew Jenner

Councillor of the City of Clarence
- Incumbent
- Assumed office October 2018

Personal details
- Born: Brendan Blomeley
- Party: Independent (since 2024)
- Other political affiliations: Liberal (1990/91 – 2024)

Brendan Blomeley is an Australian politician who served as mayor of the City of Clarence in Tasmania from 2022–26. He is a former member of the Liberal Party.

== Political career ==
=== Government staffer ===
Before running for office, Blomeley was chief of staff to Tasmanian Liberal senator David Bushby, the Chief Government Whip in the Senate.

In 2017, he was convicted and fined $2000 for using a carriage service to harass his inlaws, Julia Edwards and Ted Edwards. The conviction was set aside in 2018, but Blomeley was required to enter into an 18-month good behaviour bond on each of the two counts.

=== Clarence City Council ===
Blomeley contested the 2018 Tasmanian local government elections as an Independent Liberal. He had 3.10% of the vote and was the last candidate elected after preference distribution.

In 2022, he announced his candidacy for mayor of Clarence, leading the "Better Clarence" ticket. He was successful in a close race, elected with 50.81% of the vote against Tony Mulder after preference distribution.

Blomeley was considered for Liberal Party Senate preselection in 2023 but was ultimately not selected because he did not disclose he had been charged with breaching an apprehended violence order (AVO) in 2017.

At the 2024 Tasmanian state election, he considered contesting the division of Franklin as an independent candidate, although ultimately chose not to. His membership to the State Liberal Party of Tasmania automatically lapsed at this time.

In the 2025 Australian federal election, Blomeley ran as an independent candidate for the seat of Franklin.

Blomeley stood for reelection as councillor and mayor of Clarence at the 2026 Tasmanian council elections. While Blomeley was returned to the council, he was defeated as mayor by newcomer Drew Jenner.
