= City of Clarence =

- Local government area
- Interactive map of City of Clarence
- Coordinates: 42.8421°S 147.4385°E
- Country: Australia
- State: Tasmania
- Region: Hobart eastern shore
- Established: 1 January 1860
- Council seat: Rosny Park

Government
  - Mayor: Drew Jenner
  - State electorate: Franklin, Lyons
  - Federal division: Franklin, Lyons

Area
  - Total: 378 km^{2} (146 sq mi)

Population
  - Total: 61,531 (2021 census)
  - Density: 162.78/km^{2} (421.6/sq mi)
- Website: City of Clarence
LGAs around City of Clarence
| Brighton | Southern Midlands | Sorell |
| Glenorchy | City of Clarence | Sorell |
| Hobart | Storm Bay | Frederick Henry Bay |

Clarence City Council (or City of Clarence) is a local government body in Tasmania, and one of the five municipalities that constitutes the Greater Hobart Area. The Clarence local government area has a population of 61,531, covering the eastern shore of the River Derwent from Otago to the South Arm Peninsula and the smaller localities of Cambridge, Richmond, and Seven Mile Beach.

The administrative centre and main commercial district of Clarence is Rosny Park, approximately 5 kilometres from the Hobart central business district. Bellerive Oval lies immediately to the south, and Hobart Airport is located further north-west along the Tasman Highway.

The area that now constitutes the City of Clarence was once part of the traditional land of the Moomairemener, a Tasmanian Aboriginal sub-group. In 1803, the island of Tasmania (then Van Diemen's Land) was colonised by United Kingdom of Great Britain and Ireland, who subsequently established the settlement of Hobart. By the 1820s the settlement had spread to the 'Clarence Plains', but the area remained primarily agricultural until the mid to late 20th century, when it experienced a residential development boom. Since then Clarence has grown rapidly to become a self-sufficient city.

== Etymology ==
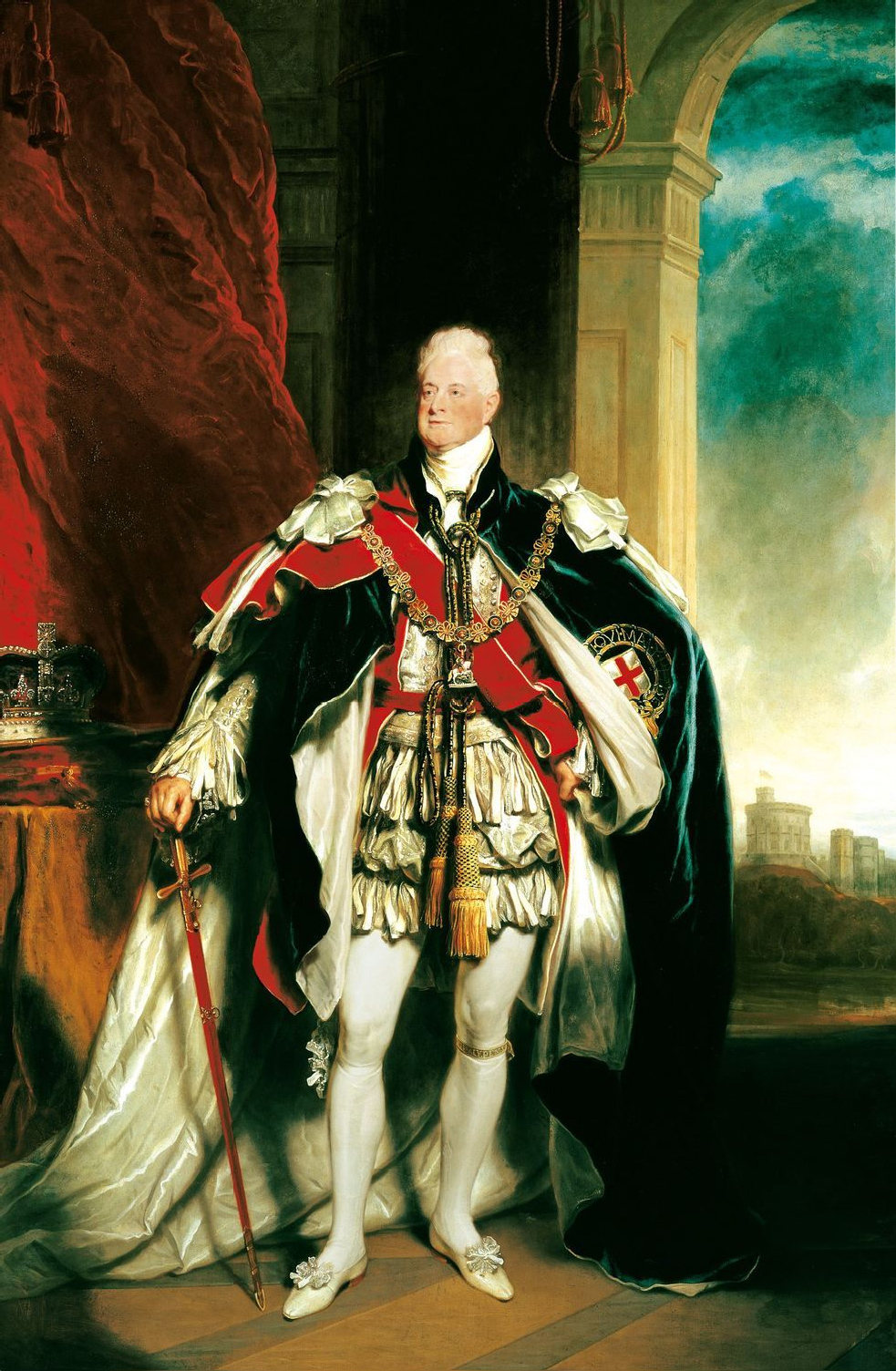
William IV, painted by Martin Archer Shee, 1833, after whom the City of Clarence was named

The City of Clarence is named indirectly after King William IV. From 1789 until 1830, when he ascended the throne, he was titled His Royal Highness The Duke of Clarence and St Andrews. It was during this period that the British settlement of Hobart was founded in 1803.

Prior to the establishment of the British colony there, Captain John Hayes of the East India Company had sailed up the River Derwent, with the vessels Duke of Clarence and the Duchess of Bengal in 1793. Relieved at making landfall following an arduous crossing of the Indian Ocean, Hayes named the region around Rokeby as 'Clarence Plains', in honour of the vessel having delivered them safely to a sanctuary. The vessel in turn, had been initially named in honour of the then future King. Almost immediately following the exploration of the region following the settlement of Hobart in 1803, Hayes name of 'Clarence Plains' fell into common use.

For over half a century, this was the name of the entire eastern shore of the River Derwent south of the Meehan Range. When it was first incorporated as a municipality in 1860, the region became referred to as the 'Clarence Municipality'. This was to remain the name of the region until 1988, when Clarence was officially declared a city, and the name changed to the 'City of Clarence'. It is not usual for Clarence residents to be referred to by a gentilic, and if so they are usually given the title Hobartians along with all other residents of Greater Hobart, however locally they are usually identified as being 'from the eastern shore'.

== History ==
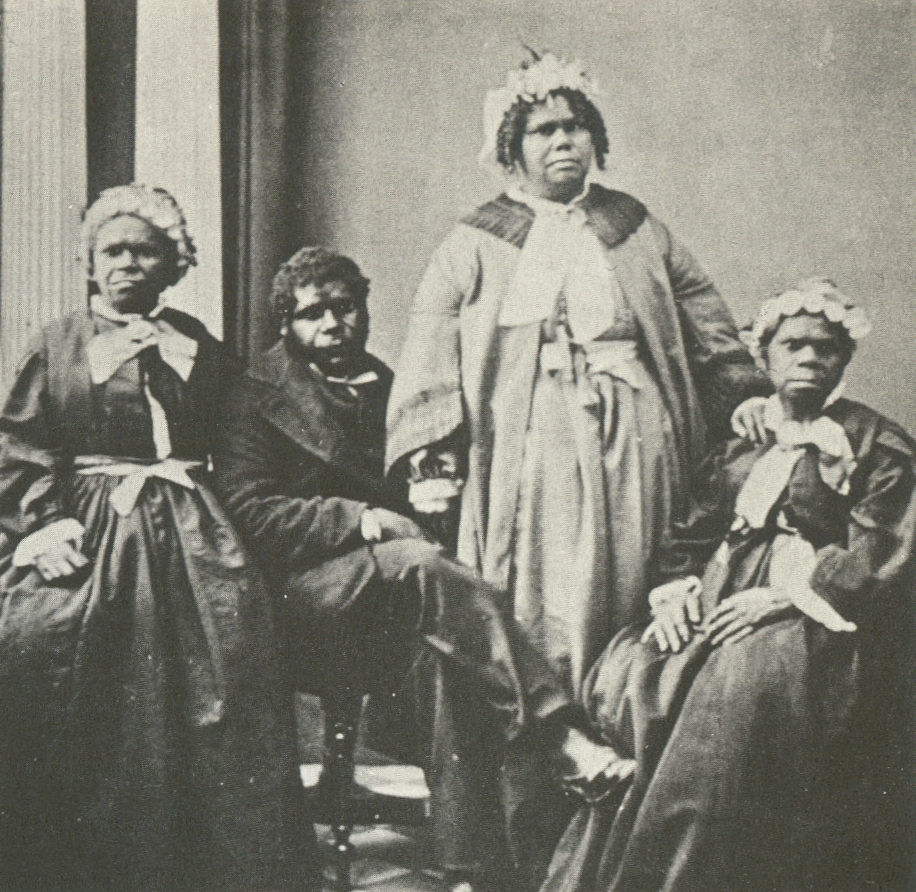
This photograph of the last full-blooded Tasmanian Aborigines from the 1860s shows a similar ethnicity to that which Clarence's indigenous inhabitants would have had.

=== Pre-history ===
It is believed the indigenous Aboriginal Tasmanians have lived in Tasmania for at least 35,000 years. Aboriginal middens can often be found along the coastline of the City of Clarence such as at Shag Bay, indicating that they hunted, and searched for seafood and shellfish in the region.

Prior to the arrival of the British, there was nine distinctive 'nations' or 'tribes' within Tasmania. The eastern shore seems to have been home to the Moomairemener. It is not known if they were a separate nation, or a sub-group of the Oyster Bay Clan (Paredarerme) whose territory stretched from the Tasman Peninsular to St Patrick's Head, just south of the modern Tasmanian township of St Mary's.

For the Moomairemener the area along the eastern shore of the Derwent was known as 'Nannyelebata' (or naniyilipata). They valued the region for its rich variety of birds, animals, seafood, and vegetation. The Coal River Valley, Flagstaff Gully, Risdon Vale, Risdon Cove and the southern Meehan Range were all regions that were within the traditional spring and summer hunting-grounds of the Moomairemener people, bringing them into conflict with the British invaders within five months of the establishment of the camp at Risdon Cove. This initial conflict grew into the Black War, which devastated the population of the native Tasmanians. The descendants of the indigenous Tasmanians now refer to themselves collectively as 'Palawa'.

=== European settlement ===
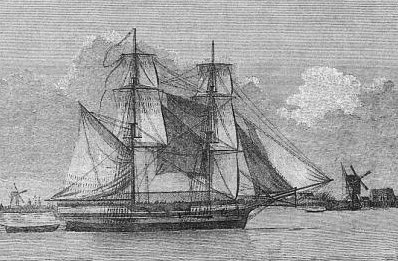
The brig, Lady Nelson was the first European vessel to anchor off what is now the City of Clarence.

Clarence was the site of the first European settlement in Tasmania (then Van Diemen's Land) in 1803 at Risdon Cove. At the time Napoleonic France and Great Britain were at war with each other. Fearing the arrival of French explorers who may have wished to make a rival claim to the island of Van Diemen's Land, the then Governor of New South Wales, Philip Gidley King dispatched a young 23-year-old Lieutenant by the name of John Bowen to establish a colony there. The first vessel of his party, Lady Nelson arrived in the Derwent on Wednesday, 8 September 1803, and Bowen arrived five days later aboard Albion.

Bowen selected the inlet at Risdon Cove, as when he had arrived in Spring the nearby stream was in full-flow. However within months it had dried up, and his camp was in despair for want of water. The site at Risdon Cove was badly affect by inconsistent water supply, and stagnation of the inlet during the late summer.

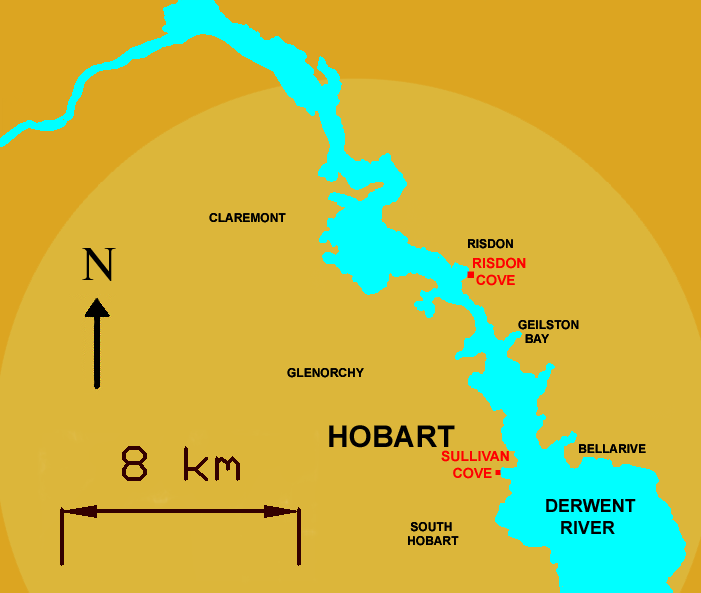
This map depicts the site of the first British settlement in Van Diemen's Land, at Risdon Cove, which is now located within the city of Clarence.

King was insecure about Bowen's juniority and inexperience as a young commander, and when he was contacted by David Collins, who had been dispatched directly from England aboard HMS Calcutta with Ocean as a supply vessel, to establish a colony at Port Phillip, he redirected Collins' expedition to the Derwent.

Collin's party arrived on the River Derwent on 16 February 1804, and immediately became becalmed in Storm Bay. Collin's dispatched troops to row ashore off what is now Rokeby to march overland to the camp at Risdon and announce their arrival. The party found navigating the thick Australian bushland hard-going, but did gain useful intelligence as the nature of the area. In the end, they only arrived shortly before the ships were able to navigate up-river.

Upon his arrival, Collins discovered the camp in such a state of despair for want of water, it was threatened with collapse. He immediately set about his first task of relocating the colony to the mouth of the Hobart Rivulet on Sullivans Cove. From there, the city of Hobart grew.

The relocation of the colony did not end the desire to settle the eastern shore of the Derwent though. Within the first few years following the establishment of Hobart Town, difficulties in growing crops led to difficulties providing food. The initial intelligence from the soldiers that had marched overland from Rokeby to Risdon Vale, and subsequent explorations suggested the plains on the eastern shore of the Derwent were more suited to agriculture.

The successful establishment of crops on Clarence Plains was vital to the survival of Hobart Town. When new settlers arrived from Norfolk Island in 1808, some were granted land in the Derwent Valley, and others upon Clarence Plains. Very soon a mixture of mansions and fine houses, cottages, inns and churches began to be built in the area. However the population growth on the eastern shore was much slower than that of Hobart Town, despite the close proximity of the young town. By the 1810s, a ferryman was making regular crossings of the Derwent between Sullivans Cove, and 'Kangaroo Point', near where the ferry still arrives at Bellerive Quay. The point was so-called due to the large numbers of Kangaroos that would be seen grazing there in the first few decades after European arrival. By the late 1810s, farmers, timbermen, and pioneers had begun settling on the eastern shore of the River Derwent.

=== 19th century ===
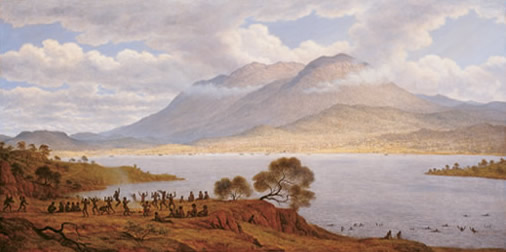
In this oil by John Glover (1834), the Moomairemener people can be seen dancing and swimming during a traditional corroboree on the eastern shore of the River Derwent (now part of the City of Clarence).

By the early 1820s a small village was growing around Kangaroo Point, that was soon to become Bellerive, making it the first site of permanent settlement in Clarence Plains. Bellerive was well fed by a freshwater stream that emptied into Kangaroo Bay, and it still exists running parallel to Rosny Park Public Golf Course as a storm water culvert.

The next areas within Clarence Plains to be settled on the eastern shore of Hobart's River Derwent, were Rosny, and its neighbours Montagu Bay and Lindisfarne to the north. Private properties had been built in each of these localities by the late 1820s, commanding excellent views across the Derwent to Hobart Town and Mount Wellington. All three suburbs are named after the three fine houses established. Although private estates and farms began to spring up throughout the district, settlements were generally isolated, with Bellerive, Cambridge, Lindisfarne, and Richmond the only major settlements of note. In 1836, Lieutenant-Governor of Van Diemen's Land, George Arthur divided the island into administrative counties, and Clarence Plains fell into Pembrokeshire. Despite this, the Clarence Plains region became a municipality in its own right in 1860. In 1862, Bellerive also became the administrative centre of the municipality, and the Eastern Police District, but for much of the late nineteenth century, Clarence Plains experienced little development, remaining primarily agricultural.

A review of colonial defences in the 1870s saw a complete overhaul of the coastal defences of Hobart, and a new fortress called Kangaroo Battery was constructed between 1880 and 1888 just to the south of Bellerive. An industry that flourished throughout Clarence Plains was fruit growing, and by the 1880s several prosperous orchards were located within the region. A rare attempt at commercial opportunism was the short-lived Bellerive to Sorell Railway line (1892 until 1926) which had its terminus on a long jetty extending into the Bay on reclaimed land that now makes up part of the Bellerive Boardwalk. It was hoped that is could eventually be connected to the Tasmanian Main Line at Brighton, thus providing rail access to the south of Clarence Plains, Sorrell and the Tasman Peninsular, but engineering difficulties and economic problems led to its abandonment.

=== 20th century ===
At the beginning of the twentieth century the eastern shore of the Derwent was still little more than isolated villages, and homesteads. This remained the situation for the next forty years, until on 22 December 1943, the floating pontoon style Hobart Bridge was opened. Despite soon developing a reputation of being treacherous to cross in stormy weather, and suffering delays caused by its lifting span opening to allow maritime traffic to pass, it created previously unprecedented access to the eastern shore. Almost immediately demand for residential property there increased. By 1947 the population of Clarence Plains had reached 5,000 for the first time.

In the 1950s, post-war demand for housing led the State Government to create a public housing programme, providing cheap accommodation to cope with returning servicemen, and the boom in migrant labour. Suburbs such as Bellerive, Lindisfarne, Montagu Bay, Mornington, Rosny and Warrane all expanded dramatically throughout the 1950s and 1960s, and housing from the period still often bears the distinctive design patterns of former government housing. For many parts of the city electricity supply only arrived in the 1950s, and sealed roads, mains water, and sewage only began to be provided in the 1960s.

The eastern shore housing boom had highlighted the inadequacies of the Hobart Bridge. Bad weather made it difficult to cross, and the massive increase in traffic in the 1950s led to severe congestion. The traffic problems, delays caused by the raising of the navigation section for maritime traffic, and the toll all proved extremely unpopular. The government announced plans to build a new bridge at a cost of £7 million, and in 1960, construction commenced on the Tasman Bridge. It opened on 18 August 1964, and greatly increased the volume of traffic capable of crossing the river. The opening of the new bridge also saw the development of two new major connecting highways, the east-heading Tasman Highway, and the north-heading East Derwent Highway, greatly improving access both to, and through Clarence.

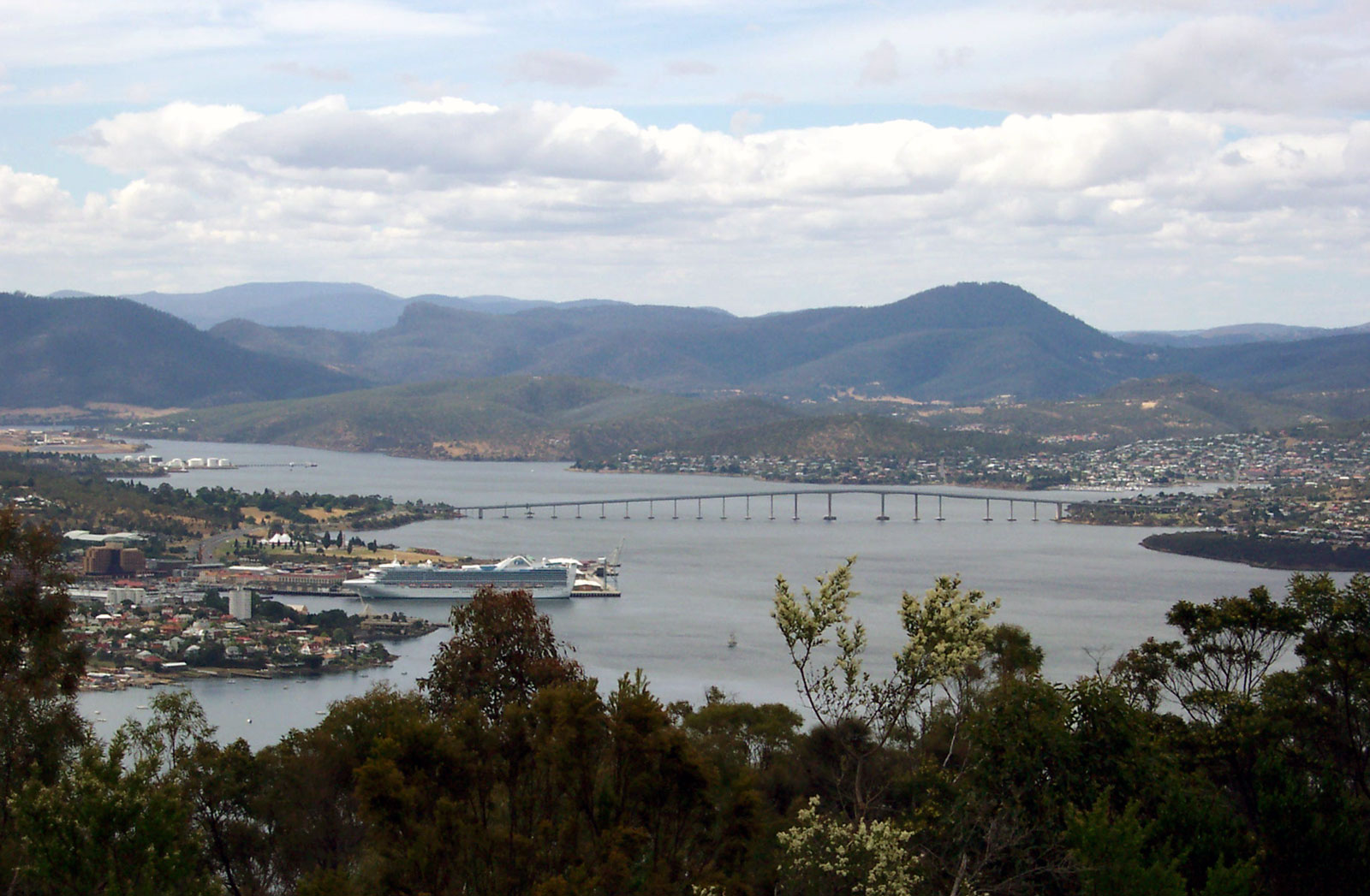
The opening of the Tasman Bridge was the catalyst for the development of the City of Clarence.

An increasing variety of services opened on the eastern shore. The Metropolitan Transport Trust supported the expansion into the eastern shore, by opening up an excellent network of bus routes into the municipality. In 1963 the Clarence War Memorial Pool was constructed, and in 1965, Eastlands Shopping Centre opened in Rosny Park, being further expanded in 1971 and 1978. The shopping centre proved a commercial success, and helped drive growth on the eastern shore. By the mid-1970s the population had passed the 40,000 mark at an incredible post-war rate of growth.

But the late twentieth century also saw two terrible disasters occur with Clarence. Much of the municipality suffered terrible damage and many homes were lost during the infamous 1967 Tasmanian fires. A second disaster occurred in the city in 1975 when the bulk carrier, Lake Illawarra collided with the Tasman Bridge collapsing a section of roadway in the Tasman Bridge disaster. Ironically, this event, which severed 'The Eastern Shore' from Hobart for nearly three years, was responsible for considerable infrastructure growth on 'The Eastern Shore', leading to it being largely self-sustaining, and being declared a city in its own right by 1988.

In the 1970s and 1980s the expansion of the Municipality of Clarence continued. Many previously rural areas developed into residential areas. New suburbs arose, such as Flagstaff Gully, Geilston Bay and Old Beach to the north, and Cremorne, Howrah, Lauderdale, Rokeby and Tranmere towards the south of the city. At the same time, Rosny Park continued to grow in importance as the administrative centre of the city, with the Clarence Council Chambers, Bellerive Police Station and Bellerive Post Office all relocating there. Banking services also relocated branches, and many new retailers opened, complementing the prosperous Eastlands Shopping Centre. Commonwealth government offices soon also began opening with services such as Centrelink, the Australian Taxation Office and the National Archives of Australia. The growth was such that the municipality was officially incorporated as a city on 24 November 1988, with the population having grown beyond 50,000. In 1993, the nearby town of Richmond was absorbed into the city of Clarence.

=== 21st century ===
The early 21st Century has seen Rosny Park continue to develop as the centre of the city. Expansion to Eastlands Shopping Centre and the nearby commercial businesses on Bligh and Bayfield Streets has seen a strong growth in retail. A Multi-screen cinema also opened in 2003, continuing the increasing availability of local services. The launch of the council's 'Kangaroo Bay Urban Design Strategy and Concept Plan' saw an attempt to modernise the town-planning of the City Centre with a programme of regeneration, improved infrastructure and amenities, the creation of a foreshore promenade and more appropriate urban landscaping. The plan sees the Kangaroo Bay area divided into five distinct precincts; Rosny Parklands, Kangaroo Bay East, Ferry Wharf, Bellerive Yacht Club, and 'The Village'.

== Geography ==
The City of Clarence, along with Glenorchy, Hobart, and Kingborough form Greater Hobart. The boundaries of the city stretch from the South Arm peninsula in the south bordered by Ralph's Bay, to Seven Mile Beach and the Pitt Water in the east, bordered by Frederick Henry Bay, to the Municitpality of Sorell in the north-east, and the Southern Midlands and Municipality of Brighton to the north. The city's western border is the River Derwent along the entire length.

In terms of area, Clarence is one of the largest cities in Australia, covering over 386 square kilometres, with 191 kilometres of coastline, including over twenty beaches, the most popular of which are Bellerive Beach, Howrah Beach, Seven Mile Beach and Clifton Beach. More than a third of the total city area is untouched bushland, with many parks, and large areas given over to nature reserves.

The city has large areas of residential property interspersed with natural flora, typically sclerophyll bushland. The city is dominated by the long, low-lying range of hills known as the Meehan Range which runs parallel to the river. A unique feature of both shores of the Derwent is the way that housing is only built to a certain height, preserving the natural skyline along the hill tops. There is large areas of farmland, and many vineyards, particularly in the Coal River valley. It also includes some rural and non-urban areas, such as the South Arm peninsular.

=== Suburbs ===
There are more than thirty suburbs with the city of Clarence. They are not named according to a convention. Many have been named after the first fine house that was built in the area (Bellerive, Lindisfarne, Montagu Bay, Geilston Bay and Rosny), others are named for geographical features (Flagstaff Gully, Mount Rumney and Roches Beach). Some, such as Bellerive, Lindisfarne and Richmond first developed as isolated villages, and others, such as Mornington and Warrane developed through public housing programmes.

Much of the city along the eastern shore of the Derwent is a connected urban environment, although primarily residential. From Cremorne and Rokeby in the south, Clarence continues uninterrupted to Old Beach in the north. Other suburbs, such as Acton Park, Cambridge and Richmond are isolated communities. Most suburbs are served by centralised commercial services that are found primarily in Rosny Park which is the city's central business district. Other commercial services are still provided in the older village centres in Bellerive, Howrah, Lindisfarne and Richmond.

=== Localities other than Hobart suburbs ===
- Campania
- Dulcot
- Grasstree Hill
- Opossum Bay
- Orielton
- Richmond
- South Arm

=== Climate ===
Located at 42° South, the City of Clarence has a mild temperate maritime climate (Group C:Cfb, according to the Köppen climate classification) with an average summer temperature of 21 °C. On average, Clarence is warmer, and has less annual precipitation than Hobart or Glenorchy. The southern regions of the city are notorious for being affected by strong southerly winds known locally as the 'sea breeze', particularly during summer months. The City of Clarence generally receives sunrise two to three minutes before Hobart and Glenorchy, and sunset is also experienced slightly after the western shore, due to the angle of shadow cast by Mount Wellington.

Climate data for Hobart Airport
| Month | Jan | Feb | Mar | Apr | May | Jun | Jul | Aug | Sep | Oct | Nov | Dec | Year |
|---|---|---|---|---|---|---|---|---|---|---|---|---|---|
| Mean daily maximum °C (°F) | 22.4 (72.3) | 22.3 (72.1) | 20.7 (69.3) | 18.1 (64.6) | 15.2 (59.4) | 12.9 (55.2) | 12.4 (54.3) | 13.4 (56.1) | 15.3 (59.5) | 17.3 (63.1) | 18.9 (66.0) | 20.6 (69.1) | 17.5 (63.5) |
| Mean daily minimum °C (°F) | 12.0 (53.6) | 12.0 (53.6) | 10.7 (51.3) | 8.7 (47.7) | 6.6 (43.9) | 4.6 (40.3) | 4.1 (39.4) | 4.6 (40.3) | 6.0 (42.8) | 7.5 (45.5) | 9.1 (48.4) | 10.7 (51.3) | 8.0 (46.4) |
| Average precipitation mm (inches) | 41.6 (1.64) | 36.6 (1.44) | 36.1 (1.42) | 43.0 (1.69) | 34.5 (1.36) | 30.1 (1.19) | 44.1 (1.74) | 46.8 (1.84) | 41.2 (1.62) | 47.7 (1.88) | 42.9 (1.69) | 54.2 (2.13) | 498.6 (19.63) |
Source: Bureau of Meteorology

== Council ==
Mayor of Clarence
- Incumbent; Drew Jenner since 29 October 2026
- Style: Councillor
- Member of: City of Clarence
- Formation: 1988
- First holder: Cathy Edwards
- Deputy: Allison Ritchie (2022–present)

The original seal of the City of Clarence adopted when the Municipality was incorporated as a city in 1988.

Residents of the City of Clarence are administered through three tiers of government, as part of the Australian federal government system. The City of Clarence is a Tasmanian local government area administered by the Clarence City Council. Local authority, responsible for provision of such services as roads, libraries and planning permissions rests with the Clarence City Council.

Provision of services such as education, policing, and health care, rests with the Tasmanian State Government. At State government level, the city constitutes the largest proportion of voters for the State electoral division known as Franklin. The top level of government administration rests with the Australian Commonwealth Government, who are responsible for foreign policy, defence, employment, and taxation. Clarence constitutes a significant proportion of the Federal electoral division of Franklin.

Clarence is classified as urban, fringe and medium (UFM) under the Australian Classification of Local Governments.

=== Current composition ===
The City of Clarence was proclaimed on 24 November 1988. Before this, the council had existed in various forms since the area became a municipality on 1 January 1860, and is responsible for local government within the city. The council originally had its chambers in Bellerive, but these were moved to Rosny Park in the early 1980s. It operates a mayor-council system that consists of nine councillors that stand for four-year terms. Elections are held every four years in October, with the last election being in 2026.

The current council is:

| Name | Position | Party affiliation |
|---|---|---|
| Brendan Blomeley | Councillor | Independent |
| Allison Ritchie | Deputy Mayor / Councillor | Independent |
| Carly Allen | Councillor | Greens |
| Zac Morrisby | Councillor | Independent |
| Emma Goyne | Councillor | Independent |
| Drew Jenner | Mayor / Councillor | Independent |
| Tony Mulder | Councillor | Independent |
| Wendy Kennedy | Councillor | Independent |
| Daniel Hulme | Councillor | Labor |

=== 2022 election results ===
2022 Tasmanian local elections: Clarence
| Party | Candidate | Votes | % | ±% |
|---|---|---|---|---|
| Independent | Tony Mulder (elected) | 4,114 | 11.57 | |
| Better Clarence | Brendan Blomeley (elected) | 4,078 | 11.47 | |
| Independent Labor | Heather Chong (elected) | 3,015 | 8.48 | |
| Better Clarence | Allison Ritchie (elected) | 2,698 | 7.59 | |
| Greens | Beth Warren (elected) | 2,332 | 6.56 | |
| Independent | Wendy Kennedy (elected) | 2,257 | 6.35 | |
| Independent | Bree Hunter (elected) | 1,813 | 5.10 | |
| Greens | Jade Darko (elected) | 1,738 | 4.89 | |
| Independent Labor | Daniel Hulme (elected) | 1,376 | 3.87 | |
| Independent | Richard James (elected) | 1,254 | 3.53 | |
| Independent One Nation | Emma Goyne (elected) | 1,201 | 3.38 | |
| Independent | John Peers | 1,094 | 3.08 | |
| Independent Liberal | James Walker (elected) | 997 | 2.80 | |
| Independent Labor | Kate Rainbird | 977 | 2.75 | |
| Independent Local | Anna Bateman | 930 | 2.61 | |
| Independent | Matt Combey | 871 | 2.45 | |
| Independent | Simon Walker | 663 | 1.86 | |
| Independent | Dave Tilley | 609 | 1.71 | |
| Independent | Andrew Jenner | 583 | 1.64 | |
| Independent | Sharyn von Bertouch | 566 | 1.59 | |
| Independent | Hans Willink | 547 | 1.54 | |
| Independent | BJ Walker | 520 | 1.46 | |
| Independent | Jimmy Collins | 450 | 1.27 | |
| Better Clarence | Kaye McPherson | 295 | 0.83 | |
| Better Clarence | Anthony James | 271 | 0.76 | |
| Independent | Mike Figg | 208 | 0.58 | |
| Better Clarence | Noelle Harb | 110 | 0.31 | |
| Total formal votes | | 35,567 | 95,27 | |
| Informal votes | | 1,765 | 4.73 | |
| Turnout | | 37,332 | 83.51 | |
Party total votes
| Independent | | 15,549 | 43.72 | |
| Better Clarence | | 7,452 | 20.95 | |
| Independent Labor | | 5,368 | 15.09 | |
| Greens | | 4,070 | 11.45 | |
| Independent One Nation | | 1,201 | 3.38 | |
| Independent Liberal | | 997 | 2.80 | |
| Independent Local | | 930 | 2.61 | |

=== State and federal politics ===
The majority area of the City of Clarence falls within the Australian Electoral Division of Franklin, while a small part in the north of the electorate around Richmond falls within the electorate of Lyons. The boundaries of the electorate of Franklin at Federal level are also the same as those of the State Division of Franklin for the Tasmanian House of Assembly (lower house). For the State Legislative Council, the City of Clarence falls within the electoral boundaries of both Pembroke, and Rumney.

Franklin voters tend to be swing voters, and although there have been long periods of occupation by one major party or the other, Franklin has never been a safe seat. The longest-serving member was William McWilliams who held the seat in two separate terms for over 20 years. Although during this period he served as a member of five different Australian political parties, and as an independent member. Liberal (conservative) member Bill Falkinder was the longest-serving member who only represented one party, holding the seat from 1946 until 1966. Liberal member Bruce Goodluck also held he seat for 18 years from 1975 until 1993, but since then the seat has been safely in Labor hands, with Harry Quick (1993–2007), and Julie Collins (since 2007) holding the seat.

The Legislative Council seat of Pembroke was a non-party seat until 1991 when Independent Member Peter McKay joined the Liberal Party. The last Independent member for Pembroke was Cathy Edwards, who represented the seat between 1999 and 2001. The current member is Labor's Luke Edmunds who has held the seat since 2022, replacing Jo Siejka, also from the Labor Party.

In Rumney, the other Legislative Council seat within Clarence. Established in 1999, and first held by Labor's Lin Thorpe. The current member is Labor's Sarah Lovell, who has held the seat since 2017, replacing current Clarence Councillor Tony Mulder who served between 2011 and 2017.

=== Policing and crime ===
The responsibility of policing the City of Clarence falls to Tasmania Police, who are the sole law-enforcement agency in all of Tasmania. There is no local urban police force. Tasmania Police's 'East Command' district is administered from Bellerive Police Station, which is now located in Rosny Park.

A 'Night Watch' had been established in Bellerive in the late 1820s, and by the 1830s, trooper police were operating throughout the district, with local jails and constabularies located at Bellerive, Richmond, Cambridge and Sorrell. A new Bellerive Police Station and Watch House was completed in 1842, and has subsequently been used as municipal council chambers, a district library and the CIB headquarters, but at present it is used as a Community Arts Centre. The introduction of the Police Regulation Act 1898, which came into being on 1 January 1899, saw the creation of one unified police force for the whole colony. Bellerive Police Station remained one of the major regional stations, responsible for the 'Eastern District', comprising the municipal areas of Brighton, Central Highlands, Clarence, Derwent Valley, Glamorgan-Spring Bay, Sorell, Southern Midlands and Tasman (Tasman Peninsular). When Rosny Park grew in importance as the administrative centre of Clarence, Bellerive Police Station was relocated there. The station remains the administrative Headquarters of 'East Command'.

Crime rates are generally low within the city, and Clarence is seen as an extremely safe place to live. According to 2016 statistics, the rate of homicide in the Region was 1.7 per 100,000, well below the national average. The rate of robberies was 33.2 per 100,000, also well below the national average. Motor vehicle crime was 551.4 per 100,000, slightly below the national average, although a significant decrease on the 2001 figure (613.9/100,000).

=== Healthcare ===
There were few health care facilities other than local general practitioner surgeries within the Municipality of Clarence prior to the Tasman Bridge disaster. The isolation caused by the severing of the bridge, and the inability of patients to travel across the river for treatment highlighted the need for local health care services on the eastern shore. The Bayfield Healthcare Centre (now known as the Clarence Community Health Centre) was developed at considerable cost to the state government, but soon became the city's primary health care provider. Whilst it is definitely not large enough to be considered a hospital, recent upgrading has seen the centre fall into the super clinic category.

=== Education ===
Rose Bay High School, which overlooks the eastern end of the Tasman Bridge, is one of the four high schools in the City of Clarence.

The first school opened within Clarence Plains was the Kangaroo Point School (now Bellerive Primary School) in 1842. However, prior to the Tasman Bridge disaster, there were few schools within the Municipality of Clarence. The isolation caused by the severing of contact between the shores when the Tasman Bridge collapsed led to the establishment of many new facilities on the eastern shore, including new schools.

There are thirteen government, and six religious primary schools in Clarence. The government primary schools are: Bellerive Primary School, Cambridge Primary School, Clarendon Vale Primary School, Howrah Primary School, Lauderdale Primary School, Lindisfarne Primary School, Lindisfarne North Primary School, Montagu Bay Primary School, Richmond Primary School, Rokeby Primary School, South Arm Primary School, The Cottage School, and Warrane Primary School. The religious primary schools in Clarence are: Corpus Christi School, Eastside Christian School, Emmanuel Christian School, John Paul II Primary School, St Cuthbert's Primary School, and St Johns School. During the period of isolation caused by the Tasman Bridge Disaster, The Friends' School established the Sherwood Primary School as an eastern shore branch for pupils in kindergarten to grade 2.

There are six High Schools within the City of Clarence. These are Clarence High School, Emmanuel Christian School, Geilston Bay High School, MacKillop College, Rokeby High School, and Rose Bay High School. The senior secondary Rosny College is also situated in the heart of Clarence. There is also a campus of TAFE Tasmania Technical and Further Education college.

== Economy ==
Despite the existence of small-scale manufacturing, agriculture, and viticulture, it is retail and government administration that provide the primary impetus of local economy. Centred upon the administrative and commercial centre of the city at Rosny Park, retail provides the largest sector of the local economy, much of which in generated through Eastlands Shopping Centre, and the nearby shops of Bligh Street and Bayfield Street.

The primary export product of the City of Clarence is now wine. Based primarily around the Coal River valley between Richmond and Acton Park, the city's viticulture industry is exemplified by European style wines, that are located at a similar latitude to French and German regions such as Champagne, Lorraine, Baden and Rheingau.

== Infrastructure ==
=== Transport ===
Despite excellent bus connections, there is a very high proportion of private car ownership within the City of Clarence. Despite this, many residents, particularly those that commute to Hobart for work, often chose to use public transportation for commuting.

Clarence is connected to Glenorchy via the Bowen Bridge, and Hobart via the Tasman Bridge, both over the River Derwent. It is connected to Sorell at Midway Point by the 19th century historic convict built Sorell Causeway. The Sorell Causeway and Tasman Bridge both form part of the Tasman Highway (A3) which is the major east–west thoroughfare through the city. The East Derwent Highway (B32) also connects to the Tasman Bridge, but heads northwards instead, and eventually reconnects with the Midland Highway (A1) at Bridgewater.

Rosny Park Transit Mall serves as the hub for Metro Tasmania bus transportation within the city, which is the primary provider of public transportation in Clarence. Bus routes reach almost all major residential areas within the city. Ferry services operates services between Bellerive Quay and Sullivans Cove at peak times on weekdays.

=== Utilities ===
Most of the utilities provision within Tasmania has traditionally fallen to government authorities. Mains water remains so, and is now provided by the Clarence City Council. Their main public supply reservoir is Risdon Brook Dam. Ironically, it was the poor supply from this water source during summer months that originally led to the abandonment of the initial British camp at Risdon Cove. However its supply during wet months is ample, and the catchment at Risdon Brook Dam provides much of the city's supply. This is supplemented by pipes that run under the carriageway of the Tasman Bridge. During the Tasman Bridge disaster, many witnesses recalled seeing large quantities of water gushing from the western side of the break in the bridge, and this was caused by these water supply pipes having been severed.

Electricity supply within the City of Clarence is administered by Aurora Energy on behalf of Hydro Tasmania, the state's sole electricity supply company. 99% of energy is generated by hydroelectricity. There is no provision for mains gas supply anywhere within the City of Clarence.

== Culture, sport and recreation ==
=== Arts ===
For many years the eastern shore of the River Derwent lagged behind the development of arts and cultural activities that had occurred within Hobart itself. The first attempt at redressing this saw the establishment of public libraries in Bellerive and Lindisfarne. The original Bellerive Police Station was also redeveloped as a Community Arts Centre.

The council now sponsors an exhibition programme of arts at the historic Rosny Farm property. In 2006 the farmhouse was redeveloped in sympathy with its heritage to allow new visual and performing arts spaces.

One area where the Clarence City Council has been particularly effective is in developing Community Arts events. For many years the Carols by Candlelight festival held annually in Charles Hand Park in the heart of the city, has continued to draw crowds of upwards of 20,000. Other annual events organised by the council include the City of Clarence Australia Day Festival, the Clarence Jazz Festival, and the Clarence Seafarers Festival – incorporating the Bellerive Regatta.

=== Media ===
The City of Clarence has few local media services, but is provided with media services that cover the entire area of Greater Hobart. The best selling newspaper is the daily The Mercury. In 1985 a local free weekly newspaper The Southern Star was begun by publisher Harris & Co, however the difficult advertising market in a small community meant it could not sustain a rivalry with The Mercury, and it closed in December 1995. The Eastern Shore Sun is a freely delivered newspaper detailing local issues and events in the City of Clarence.

Television is provided by five licensed operators, the government provided Australian Broadcasting Corporation, and Special Broadcasting Service, and the commercial operators WIN Television (Nine Network affiliate) Seven Tasmania, and Tasmanian Digital Television (Network 10 affiliate).

=== Elite sports ===
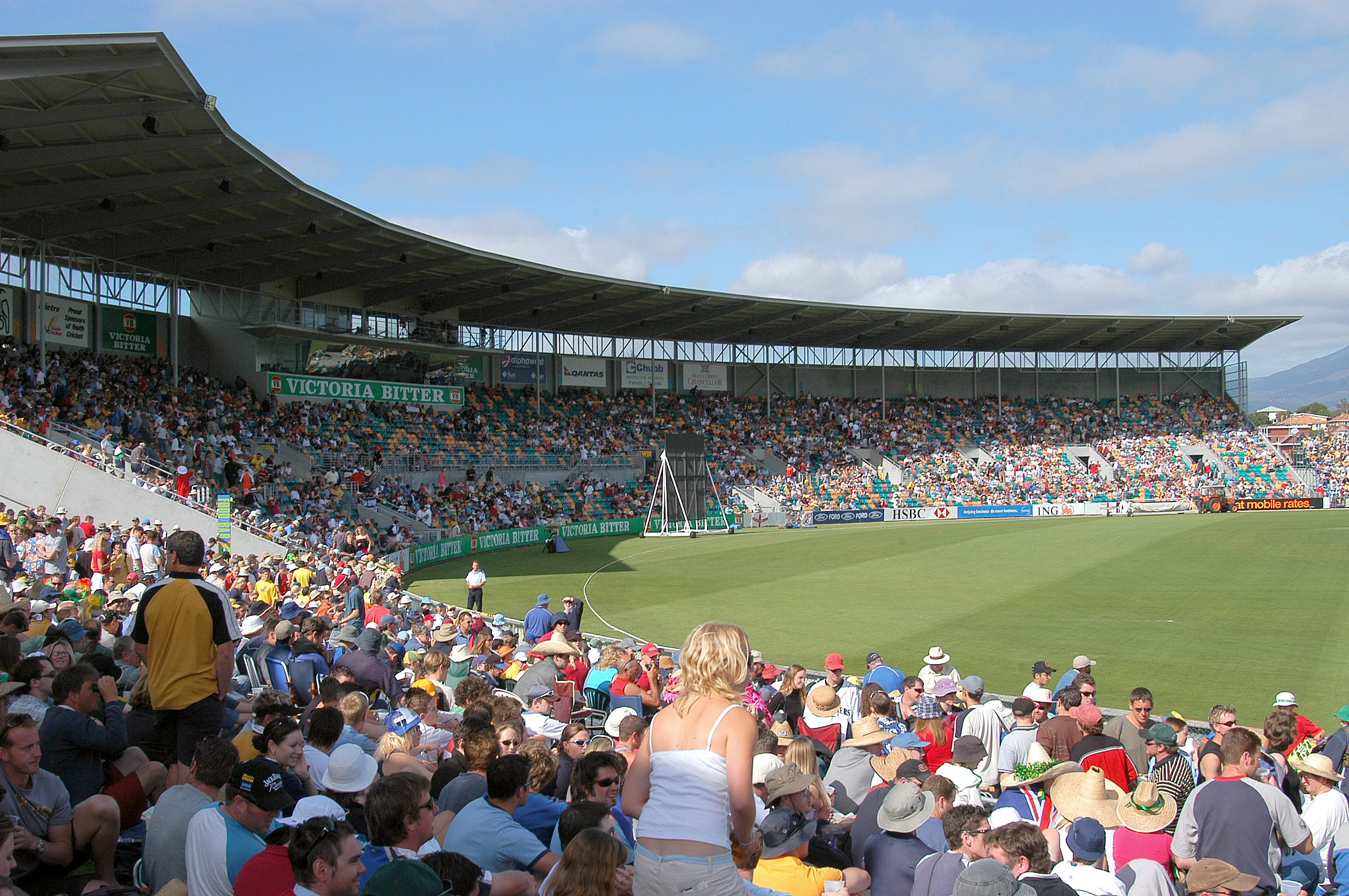
Bellerive Oval in the heart of Clarence, is one of Tasmania's premier sporting venues.

The City of Clarence has a very active culture of sports. It is home to one of Australia's nine test cricket grounds in Bellerive Oval. The ground usually hosts Australian home tests once every two years, and one-day internationals on an annual basis. It is also the home ground for the Tasmanian Tigers, Tasmania's first-class cricket team.

Bellerive Oval is also home to two of the cities elite sports teams, the Clarence District Cricket Club who compete in the Tasmanian Grade Cricket competition, and the Clarence Football Club, known colloquially as 'The Roos' who compete in the Tasmanian Football League, both of whom are semi-professional. Both sides also have derby rivals also based within the City of Clarence. For the cricket side, rivals Lindisfarne Cricket Club are located 3 km (2 mi) to the north, and for the Australian Rules football side, Lauderdale Football Club are located 7 km (4 mi) to the South.

Both teams have proved extremely successful: Clarence Football Club won the Tasmanian Football League in 1970, 1979, 1981, 1984, 1993–94, 1996–97, and 2000 (9 times in total), as well as winning the Southern Football League in 2001, 2002, 2004, and 2006 (4 total), during the period in which the statewide league was not competed for. Clarence District Cricket Club have won 11 TCA Premierships in 1981–82, 1982–83, 1983–84, 1984–85, 1987–88, 1988–89, 1989–90, 1990–91, 1994–95, 2002–2003, and 2003–2004.

Other amateur cricket clubs, Montagu Bay Cricket Club, St. Aidans Cricket Club Inc. and Richmond Cricket Club are also based within Clarence, but compete in the Kookaburra Southern Cricket Association rather than the Tasmanian Grade Competition.

Olympia FC Warriors (based at Warrior Park, Warrane) and Clarence United (based at Wentworth Park, Howrah) are the city's premier football teams, and play in the National Premier League. Nelson Eastern Suburbs FC is also based in Clarence at the North Warrane Oval and also compete in the Southern Championship.

=== Other sport ===
The standard of public sporting facilities is generally excellent throughout the city, with provision for most popular sports at venues such as the Clarence Aquatic Centre (home to the State Swimming Championships until 1998), the Clarence Sports Centre, and Wentworth Park, home base for Southern Touch (Touch Football) and also hockey. Along with Clarence Sports Centre, Bellerive Sports Centre and Warrane Sports Centre provide facilities for sports such as basketball, indoor football, squash, tennis and badminton. Nearby Edgeworth Street in Warrane is home to a baseball ground and the Eastern Shore Action Indoor Sports Centre (covering Indoor Cricket, Indoor Soccer and Indoor Netball). North Warrane Oval is home to Eastern Suburbs competing in the Tasmanian Rugby Union statewide League.

There is also a very active club sports community within most of these sports. Tennis, golf and bowls are also popular, particularly amongst older adults. Rosny Park Public Golf Course is a 9-hole golf course located in the heart of the city, but there are also seven other golf courses located throughout Clarence, including Tasmania's premier club, the Tasmanian Golf Club.

Most local schools participate in school competitions in major popular sports such as association football (also sometimes referred to as soccer in Australia), Australian rules football, cricket, hockey, netball, Touch Football, swimming and athletics. Many of these schools are equipped with their own home grounds for many of these sports and almost all at least have cricket grounds.

=== Recreation ===
The city of Clarence is blessed with many open spaces, parks and areas of bushland. In addition to hills, there is 191 km (119 mi) of shoreline, much of which is connected with paths, as well as over 30 beaches. Bellerive Yacht Club is located within the city on the shore of the River Derwent in Kangaroo Bay. It is the second largest sailing club in southern Tasmania with over 800 members, and an annual turnover of over A$ 1 million. The club also host the annual Bellerive Regatta every February. Other water sports and boating activities such as sailing, boating, fishing and diving are also popular within the city, which has eleven boat ramps, and numerous jetties. Cycling is also a popular activity, and several kilometres of cycleways exist within the city, particularly following the shoreline. Horse riding facilities can be found at Acton and surfing is popular at Clifton and Goats beaches.

== Demography ==
As at the 2016 Census, the population of the City of Clarence was almost 55,000, making it the largest local government area within Greater Hobart. Of these, almost 10,000 (18%) were under the age of 15, and around 11,000 (20%) over the age of 65. The average age of Clarence residents is 43, with 3.5% of residents identifying themselves as Indigenous Australians and 60% of Clarence residents over the age of 15 being married.

The City of Clarence is a primarily residential city with 20,737 dwellings, although small scale manufacturing, agriculture, viticulture, retail and government administration are all prevalent. The majority of the residences (17,298) in Clarence are separate detached houses (90%), although 998 residences were attached housing (5%), 831 were flats (4%), and there was also 94 other residences which did not fall into any of these categories. There was an average of 2.5 persons per dwelling, and out of the 20,737 residences 1,532 or 7% were vacant. 37% of occupied dwellings were privately owned, a further 37% were mortgaged, 20% rented, and the rest rent-free or under some other form of tenure. The average house price in Clarence is A$ 310,000. The average weekly mortgage cost is $243, and the average cost of rent is $150.

The major sectors of employment are retail (20%), education (12%), health and Community services (12%), property management and business services (5%), and construction and trades (5%). The average weekly income of Clarence residents (August 2006) is $458, which is $60 above the state average. The median household income is $1,124, $92 above the states average, and proves to be an average increase of 8% from the 2001 average.

85% of residents of Clarence were born in Tasmania, similar to the state average of 83%. Of those, 92% identified as being Anglo-Celtic Australian. However this proportion has decreased by 1.1% from the 2001 figure. 91% of residents were Australian citizens, exactly the same as the state figure. Of those not born in Tasmania, the next most common birthplaces were England (1,996 or 4.0% of total), New Zealand (335, 0.7%), Scotland (288, 0.6%), Germany (228, 0.5%), and the Netherlands (182, 0.4%).

92% of Clarence residents spoke English as their primary language. Other languages identified as frequently spoken within the city were Greek (199 speakers), German (157), Italian (107), Spanish (80), and Dutch (60). 3,155 residents identified various other languages as regularly spoken within the city.

The most commonly identified religious beliefs amongst residents of the City of Clarence were Anglicanism (16,217, or 21%), Roman Catholic (10,610, or 19%), and Uniting (2,331, or 2%). 9,917 residents (20%) belonged to various other faiths, and 9,611 (or 5%) identified as having no religion.

== See also ==
- List of local government areas of Tasmania
