= Dulcot, Tasmania =

Dulcot
- Town
- Coordinates: 42°47′15″S 147°24′03″E
- Country: Australia
- State: Tasmania
- Region: Hobart
- LGA: Clarence
- Location: 19 km (12 mi) NE of Rosny Park

Government
  - State electorate: Franklin
  - Federal division: Franklin

Population
  - Total: 235 (2016 census)
- Postcode: 7025
Localities around Dulcot
Grasstree Hill	Richmond	Richmond
Grasstree Hill	Dulcot	Cambridge
Risdon Vale	Cambridge	Cambridge

Dulcot is a rural residential locality in the local government area (LGA) of Clarence in the Hobart LGA region of Tasmania. The locality is about 19 kilometres (12 mi) north-east of the town of Rosny Park. The 2016 census recorded a population of 235 for the state suburb of Dulcot.

== History ==
Dulcot was gazetted as a locality in 1970. Dulcott (with 2 t's) was a township name in the area by 1845.

== Geography ==
Belbin Rivulet forms the south-eastern boundary.

== Road infrastructure ==
Route B31 (Richmond Road) passes through the eastern extremity of the locality.
