= Clifton Beach =

Clifton Beach may refer to:

- Clifton Beach, Queensland, Australia
- Clifton Beach, Tasmania, Australia
- Clifton Beach, Karachi, Pakistan
- Clifton B. Beach (1845-1902), U.S. Representative from Ohio
- Clifton, Cape Town, South Africa.
