= Grasstree Hill, Tasmania =

Grasstree Hill Tasmania
- Coordinates: 42°46′30″S 147°22′11″E
- Population: 105 (2016 census)
- Postcode(s): 7017
- Location: 15 km (9 mi) N of Rosny Park
- LGA(s): Clarence
- Region: Hobart
- State electorate(s): Franklin
- Federal division(s): Franklin
Localities around Grasstree Hill:
Richmond	Richmond	Richmond
Richmond, Risdon	Grasstree Hill	Dulcot
Risdon, Risdon Vale	Risdon Vale	Dulcot, Risdon Vale

Grasstree Hill is a rural locality in the local government area (LGA) of Clarence in the Hobart LGA region of Tasmania. The locality is about 15 kilometres (9.3 mi) north of the town of Rosny Park. The 2016 census recorded a population of 105 for the state suburb of Grasstree Hill.

== History ==
Grasstree Hill was gazetted as a locality in 1970. Grasstree Hill (the landform feature) is believed to have been named for the dwarf grass trees that grew on it. Shelstone was the name of the original town reserve but it was never made official.

== Geography ==
Grasstree Hill Rivulet forms part of the south-eastern boundary.

== Road infrastructure ==
Route C324 (Grasstree Hill Road) passes through from south to north.
