= Rosny Hill Road =

Road in Hobart, Tasmania

Coordinates: 42°52′02.6″S 147°21′57.8″E

Rosny Hill Road Tasmania
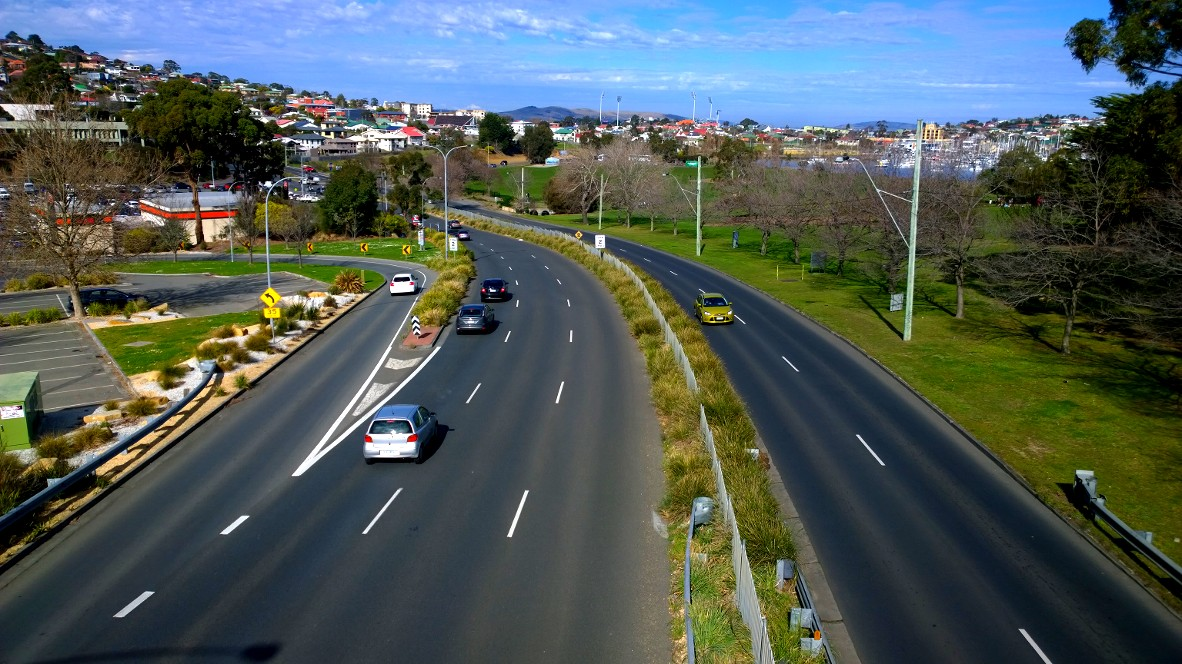
- Rosny Hill Road, in-between Eastlands and Rosny College

General information
- Type: Road
- Length: 1 km (0.6 mi)

Major junctions
- North end: Tasman Highway; Rose Bay, Tasmania
- South end: Cambridge Road; Rosny, Tasmania

Location(s)
- Region: Hobart
- Major suburbs: Rosny

Rosny Hill Road is a major road in Hobart, Australia. Prior to the completion of the Rosny Bypass, Rosny Hill Road (in conjunction with Cambridge Road) was the major trunk road connecting the city to the airport. Today the road provides a link between the Tasman Highway and the suburbs of Bellerive, Rosny and Warrane as well as providing convenient access to Eastlands and Bellerive Oval.
