= Sandford, Tasmania =

Sandford
- Suburb
- Interactive map of Sandford
- Coordinates: 42°56′38″S 147°29′56″E
- Country: Australia
- State: Tasmania
- Region: Greater Hobart
- City: Hobart
- LGA: Clarence
- Location: 16 km (9.9 mi) SE of Rosny Park

Government
  - State electorate: Franklin
  - Federal division: Franklin

Population
  - Total: 2,046 (2021 census)
- Postcode: 7020
Suburbs around Sandford
Ralphs Bay	Lauderdale	Frederick Henry Bay
Ralphs Bay	Sandford	Frederick Henry Bay
Ralphs Bay	Clifton Beach	Cremorne

Sandford is a locality in the local government area (LGA) of Clarence in the Greater Hobart region of Tasmania. The locality is about 16 kilometres (9.9 mi) south-east of the town of Rosny Park. The 2021 census recorded a population of 2,046 for the state suburb of Sandford.

It is located on the South Arm Peninsula on the outskirts of Hobart. Sandford is also home to the Sandford Rifle Club which is located on Rifle Range Road. It is far enough from the Tasmanian capital of Hobart to consist largely of bushland, but near enough to be within commuting distance. Most of the inhabitants of Sandford live on a large acreage, either used for farming or recreational purposes.

== History ==
Sandford was gazetted as a locality in 1966. Muddy Plains Post Office opened on 20 November 1850. It was renamed "Sandford" in 1887 and closed in 1972.

== Geography ==
The waters of the River Derwent form the western boundary, and Frederick Henry Bay most of the southern and eastern.

== Road infrastructure ==
Route B33 (South Arm Road) runs through from north to south.
