= Cremorne, Tasmania =

Cremorne Hobart, Tasmania
- Coordinates: 42°57′25″S 147°32′1″E
- Population: 526 (2016 census)
- Postcode(s): 7024
- Location: 21 km (13 mi) SE of Rosny Park
- LGA(s): City of Clarence
- Region: Hobart
- State electorate(s): Franklin
- Federal division(s): Franklin
Suburbs around Cremorne:
Sandford	Sandford	Frederick Henry Bay
Sandford	Cremorne	Frederick Henry Bay
Sandford	Pipe Clay Lagoon, Sandford	Clifton Beach

Cremorne is a rural residential locality in the local government area (LGA) of Clarence in the Hobart LGA region of Tasmania. The locality is about 21 kilometres (13 mi) south-east of the town of Rosny Park. The 2016 census recorded a population of 526 for the state suburb of Cremorne. It is a town located on the South Arm Peninsula on the outskirts of Hobart.

== History ==
Cremorne was gazetted as a locality in 1968. Originally gazetted as Pipe Clay, the name was changed in 1968. The 2011 census found the Cremorne postcode area to have the highest median personal income in Tasmania, at $749 per week.

== Geography ==
The waters of Frederick Henry Bay form the eastern boundary, while Pipe Clay Lagoon forms most of the southern.

== Road infrastructure ==
Route B33 (South Arm Road) passes to the south-west. From there, Cremorne Avenue provides access to the locality.
