= Clarence Aquatic Centre =

Aquatic sports facility in Tasmania, Australia

- Interactive map of Clarence Aquatic Centre
- Location: Montagu Bay, Hobart, Tasmania, Australia
- Coordinates: 42.8639°S 147.3594°E
- Owner: Clarence City Council

Construction
- Opened: 1963
- Cost: A$2.8 million (2003)

Tenant
- Clarence Crocs Water Polo Club (since 1964)

Website
- Official website

The Clarence Aquatic Centre is a major aquatic sports facility located in Montagu Bay, on the eastern shore of the state capital of Hobart, Tasmania, Australia. Operated by the YMCA, it serves as an important venue for swimming, water sports, and aquatic education in the City of Clarence.

== History ==
=== Establishment ===
The facility originally opened in 1963 as the Clarence War Memorial Pool, featuring an outdoor 50 m (160 ft) Olympic-sized pool, a children's wading pool, and a toddler's splash pool. The pool was surrounded by landscaped gardens and included a large uncovered grandstand. Due to its open-air design, the pool operated only during the warmer months, closing during winter.

=== Inflatable "Bubble" Cover ===
In 1982, the Clarence City Council implemented a significant upgrade by covering the pool with an inflatable dome structure, commonly referred to as "the Bubble." Constructed from synthetic canvas, the structure provided protection from the elements and allowed the facility to operate year-round. The distinctive white dome quickly became a well-known feature of the eastern shore and was visible from the Tasman Bridge.

During the 1980s and 1990s, the Clarence Pool was the only indoor Olympic-size swimming pool in Tasmania, making it a central hub for competitive swimming and aquatic sports. The venue hosted the Australian Swimming Championships multiple times and accommodated various aquatic disciplines, including water polo, underwater hockey, canoe polo, and fin swimming.

Despite its success, the bubble was not initially designed for permanent use, leading to accelerated wear and structural issues. In one notable incident, a seam split during a swimming competition, forcing temporary closure for repairs. By the late 1990s, it became evident that the structure was nearing the end of its operational lifespan.

=== Redevelopment ===
Following the development of the Hobart Aquatic Centre by the Hobart City Council, the Clarence City Council initiated plans to modernise its aquatic facility. In 2002, the inflatable bubble was permanently removed, and in 2003, the centre closed for an extensive 11-month refurbishment project costing approximately A$2.8 million.

The redevelopment introduced a modern, energy-efficient building to enclose the existing pools. Upgrades included new non-slip pool decking, renovated changing facilities, improved lighting and heating systems, and enhanced disability access. These upgrades aimed to improve both the functionality and comfort of the facility for patrons year-round.

== Current Operations ==
The Clarence Aquatic Centre reopened in 2004 under the management of the YMCA, which continues to oversee its operations. The facility offers a range of aquatic programs, including:

- Learn-to-swim classes for children and adults
- Junior Flippa Ball (a modified version of water polo)
- Aqua aerobics sessions
- Adult swim education
- Water safety and lifesaving courses

The Clarence Aquatic Centre also serves as the home pool for the Clarence Crocs Water Polo Club and regularly hosts local swimming competitions and training sessions.

== See also ==
- Sport in Tasmania
