= Lindisfarne Cricket Club =

- Founded: 1891
- Home ground: Anzac Park
- Colours: Dark Blue/Light Blue
- Head coach: Matthew Wilkie
- Captain: Charlie Wakim
- TCA Titles: 4
- 2019–20: 1st

Lindisfarne Cricket Club (LCC), also known as "The Lightning", is a grade level cricket club representing Lindisfarne, Tasmania in Tasmania's Grade Cricket Competition. The LCC play their home games at Anzac Park, in Lindisfarne, a suburb of the City of Clarence.

Lindisfarne were formed in 1891 and originally played in the Clarence Cricket Association. They joined the Southern Suburban Cricket Association in 1947, and were admitted into the TCA Grade Competition in 1992. It took Lindisfarne 9 years to win their first premiership in 2000–01.

Many top players have played for Lindisfarne including Jamie Cox, Andrew Downton, Brendan Drew, Rod Tucker, Colin Miller, Shane Watson, Jason Krejza, Shaun Tait, Ben McDermott, Mac Wright, Charlie Wakim and Nathan Ellis.

== Honours ==
TCA Premierships: (4) 2000–2001, 2010–2011, 2018–2019 and 2019–20.
