= Flagstaff Gully =

- Suburb
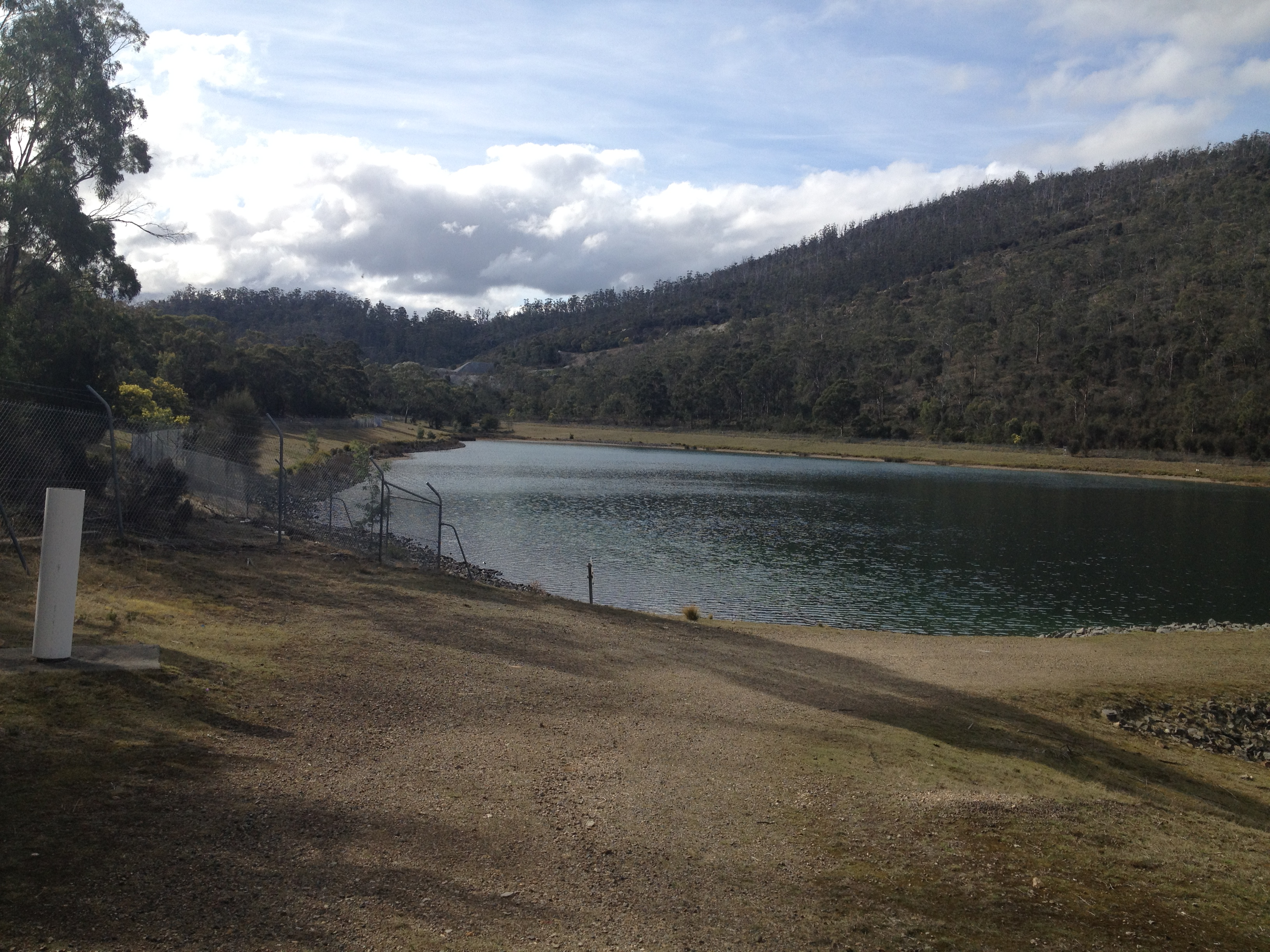

- Interactive map of Flagstaff Gully
- Coordinates: 42°50′34″S 147°22′25″E
- Country: Australia
- State: Tasmania
- City: Hobart
- LGA: City of Clarence
- Location: 5.7 km (3.5 mi) from Hobart

Government
  - Federal division: Franklin
- Postcode: 7015
Suburbs around Flagstaff Gully
Geilston Bay
Lindisfarne	Flagstaff Gully
Lindisfarne	Warrane	Mornington

Flagstaff Gully is a suburb of the City of Clarence in Tasmania, Australia. It is part of greater Hobart. It is located in the hills east of Lindisfarne. The Flagstaff Gully Reservoir is in the area.

There is a substantial Dolerite quarry at Flagstaff Gully producing Blue Metal gravel for road surfaces.

== Sport and recreation ==
The Clarence Mountain Bike Park includes dirt jumps, mountain cross, dual slalom, downhill and a cross country track and is located on the Flagstaff Gully Road.

There are a few walking trails located in Flagstaff Gully (Geilston Gully Circuit, Pilchers Hill Loop)

The Sporting Shooters Association of Australia Tasmania Inc have the Oakdale Pistol Club Inc located on the Flagstaff Gully Road.

The Hobart Miniature Steam Locomotive Society has a 365 metre track on Flagstaff Gully Road.

== History ==
In 1905, the Lane brothers settled on a piece of land on the hill between Flagstaff Gully and Lindisfarne and cleared the land and built a humpy. Shortly after, they spent two days splitting wood and built fence along the gully. A house named "The Turning" was built within the following years. By 1911, a farm had been built by a man named Hal and an orchard was built below the humpy that same year.
