= Emmanuel Christian School (Tasmania) =

Location
- Rokeby, Tasmania, Tasmania; Australia; 42.9°S 147.44°E

Information
- Type: Christian, private, day
- Motto: Opening minds to life’s possibilities
- Established: 1979
- Principal: Brad Pharaoh
- Enrolment: 200
- Website: emmanuel.tas.edu.au

Emmanuel Christian School is a coeducational, private Kindergarten to Year 10 Christian school in Rokeby, on Hobart's Eastern Shore. It is part of Christian Schools of Tasmania, a network of four schools around Hobart. It is owned and managed by an association, whose members are parents and past parents of students.
