= Duke of Clarence (ship) =

Several ships have borne the name Duke of Clarence, named for one or another Duke of Clarence, originally Prince William, the first Duke of Clarence and St Andrews, who acceded to the throne as William IV of the United Kingdom, but later the Duke of Clarence and Avondale:

- Duke of Clarence was one of two vessels that Lieutenant John Hayes of the Bombay Marine employed for an exploration trip to New Guinea (and ultimately Tasmania) for the British East India Company. Duke of Clarence was of 250 tons (bm) burthen and 14 guns and the Duchess of Bengal was an armed snow of 100 tons (bm). The voyage, which later incorporated a visit to Canton, lasted from February 1793 to December 1794. Duke of Clarence was lost on the Sumatra Sand, Calcutta, on 10 August 1801.
- Duke of Clarence, of 180, 184, or 188 tons (bm), was launched at Scarborough in 1789. In 1791 she made a voyage to hunt whales at Walvis Bay. The last mention of her states that she was at Saint Helena on 6 October, together with other homeward bound whalers.
- Duke of Clarence was a tender to Sir George Macartney on his Embassy to China (1793–94). Needing a ship's tender, Macartney arranged for the purchase of a vessel at Batavia in March 1793 for 5000 Spanish dollars. She was an almost-new, European-built, copper-sheathed brig of 100 tons (bm), armed with six 2-pounder guns. Her name was Nereide; Macartney renamed her Duke of Clarence.
- HM hired armed cutter Duke of Clarence, served the British Royal Navy under two contracts, from 1794 to 1801, and 1803 until wrecked in 1804.
- Duke of Clarence was a clincher-built sloop launched at Portsmouth in 1797, of 70 tons (bm), and armed with four six-pounder and six 4-pounder guns. She left Liverpool on 7 August 1800 on a slave trading voyage but her crew mutinied and seized her.
- Duke of Clarence was a British-built, Liverpool-based ship of 726 (or 728, or 740) tons (bm) for which Captain George Walters (or George Walker) received a letter of marque on 6 July 1799. It showed her as armed with twenty-six 18 and 42-pounder cannon, and with a crew of 45 men. In 1800 she transported slaves from the Bight of Biafra and Gulf of Guinea islands to Jamaica, where she arrived with 780 slaves. She returned to Liverpool on 5 November 1800; she had left with 86 crew members and had suffered 30 crew deaths on her voyage. Her origins are obscure as she entered Lloyd's Register only in 1799 with no place or date of launch, and in the Register of Shipping in 1800 with the notation "old". She disappeared from the registers by 1802.
- Duke of Clarence, of 180 tons (bm), was launched at Liverpool in 1800. She conducted one slave trading voyage in 1803 and then foundered in June 1805 in the River Plate on her first whaling voyage to the South Seas whale fishery.
- TSS Duke of Clarence (1892–1930), was a transport; during World War I she served the Royal Navy as the armed boarding steamer HMS Duke of Clarence.
