= Warrane, Tasmania =

Warrane
- Suburb
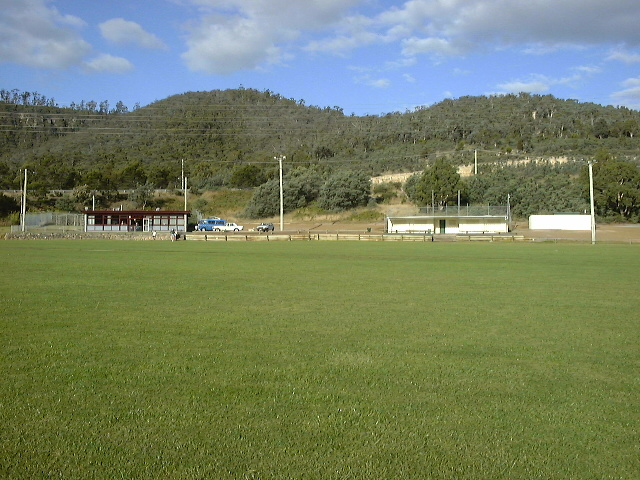
- North Warrane Oval with the Meehan Ranges in the background

- Interactive map of Warrane
- Coordinates: 42°51′35″S 147°22′36″E
- Country: Australia
- State: Tasmania
- City: Hobart
- LGA: City of Clarence

Government
  - Federal division: Franklin

Population
  - Total: 2,695 (SAL 2021)
- Postcode: 7018
Suburbs around Warrane
Rose Bay	Lindisfarne	Flagstaff Gully
Montagu Bay	Warrane	Mornington
Rosny Park	Bellerive	Mornington

Warrane is a suburb of Hobart, Tasmania, Australia, within the City of Clarence local government area. It is approximately 5 kilometres (3 mi) from Hobart's CBD. It is located between Rosny Park and Mornington and runs parallel to the Tasman Highway.

Warrane is a primarily residential suburb, and is served by Rosny Park for commercial services.

Public facilities include Warrane Primary School, Clarence Campus of The Tasmanian Polytechnic and the Tasmanian Academy (formerly TAFE Tasmania). St. Peter's Lutheran Church is located there.

== History ==
The current Post Office opened on 1 June 1955. An earlier office named Montagu Bay opened in 1923, was renamed Warrane that year, Montagu Bay in 1944 and closed in 1951.

== Sporting amenities ==
The Warrane Sports Centre,

Warriors Park (Formerly the Warrane Hockey Centre) an AstroTurf Pitch and is the home of Hobart Olympia Warriors,

The North Warrane Oval is sheltered by the Meehan Range and is home to Eastern Suburbs RUFC, MacKillop Beltas Cricket Club and Wellington Cricket Club.

== Meehan Range ==
On its north-eastern side, Warrane abuts the Meehan Range, a bushland area with bush walks, cliffs, and views of Mount Wellington and surrounding areas. The ranges are home to native wildlife including Tasmanian devils and tiger snakes.
