= 2022 Tasmanian local elections =

Local elections in Tasmania, Australia

← 2018	3–25 October 2022	2026 →
- Turnout: 84.79% (▲26.09%)

The 2022 Tasmanian local elections were held in October 2022 to elect the councils of the 29 local government areas (LGAs) in Tasmania, Australia. Mayoral and deputy mayoral elections were also held.

For the first time in Tasmanian local elections, voting was compulsory. Polls opened on 3 October and closed at 2pm on Tuesday, 25 October.

== Electoral system ==
Councillor elections are conducted using a slightly modified version of the Hare-Clark electoral system, which is also used for Tasmanian House of Assembly elections. Mayors and deputy mayors are elected using preferential voting, which is used for Tasmanian Legislative Council elections.

The Robson Rotation is used to rotate the order in which candidate names appear on ballot papers. All voting in Tasmanian local elections is conducted by post.

== Elections timeline ==
- 5 September – Candidate nominations open
- 19 September – Candidate nominations close
- 3 October – Voting opens
- 25 October – Voting closes
- 26 October – Counting begins

== Party changes before elections ==
A number of councillors joined or left parties before the 2022 elections.

Council	Councillor	Former party	New party	Date
Huon Valley	Bec Enders	Independent	Liberal	28 March 2022

== Campaign ==
A number of local tickets were formed to contest elections. In Hobart, Our Hobart and Your Hobart Independents (YHI) were formed, with councillors Mike Dutta, Anna Reynolds and Zelinda Sherlock joining the YHI ticket. In Kingborough, three independents stood as Kingborough Thrives candidates.

Former Liberal Democrats NSW senator Duncan Spender stood in Hobart as a deputy mayoral and council candidate.

Four mayoral elections, along with one deputy mayoral election, were uncontested, as well as the entire King Island council election.

== Results ==
=== Mayoral elections ===
Mayors in italics did not recontest their positions.

Council	Before		Result after preference distribution			
Council	Mayor	Party	Party	Candidate	%	Result
Break O'Day	Mick Tucker	Independent	Independent	Mick Tucker	51.35	Independent hold
Break O'Day	Mick Tucker	Independent	Independent	Janet Drummond (Note: Second-placed on primary vote as the election did not require preference distribution.)	33.50	Independent hold
Brighton	Tony Foster	Independent	Ind. Liberal	Leigh Gray	52.07	Independent Liberal gain
Brighton	Tony Foster	Independent	Independent	Phil Owen	27.23	Independent Liberal gain
Burnie	Alvwyn Boyd	Independent	Independent	Teeny Brumby	57.36	Independent gain
Burnie	Alvwyn Boyd	Independent	Ind. Labor	Chris Lynch	42.64	Independent gain
Central Coast	Jan Bonde	Independent	Independent	Cheryl Fuller	54.51	Independent gain
Central Coast	Jan Bonde	Independent	Ind. Liberal	Garry Carpenter	45.49	Independent gain
Central Highlands	Loueen Triffitt	Independent	Independent	Loueen Triffitt	N/A	Independent hold
Central Highlands	Loueen Triffitt	Independent	Elected unopposed			Independent hold
Circular Head	Darryl Quilliam	Independent	Independent	Gerard Blizzard	57.26	Independent gain
Circular Head	Darryl Quilliam	Independent	Ind. Liberal	John Oldaker	42.74	Independent gain
Clarence	Doug Chipman	Independent	Better Clarence	Brendan Blomeley	50.81	Better Clarence gain
Clarence	Doug Chipman	Independent	Independent	Tony Mulder	49.19	Better Clarence gain
Derwent Valley	Michelle Dracoulis	Ind. Labor	Ind. Labor	Michelle Dracoulis	59.16	Ind. Labor hold
Derwent Valley	Michelle Dracoulis	Ind. Labor	Ind. Liberal	Peter Binny	21.55	Ind. Labor hold
Devonport	Annette Rockliff	Independent	Independent	Alison Jarman	55.04	Independent gain
Devonport	Annette Rockliff	Independent	National	Steve Martin	44.96	Independent gain
Dorset	Greg Howard	Ind. Liberal	Ind. Liberal	Greg Howard	50.98	Independent Liberal hold
Dorset	Greg Howard	Ind. Liberal	Independent	Beth Donoghue	49.02	Independent Liberal hold
Flinders	David Williams	Independent	Independent	Rachel Summers	66.81	Independent gain
Flinders	David Williams	Independent	Independent	Peter Rhodes	33.19	Independent gain
George Town	Greg Kieser	Ind. Liberal	Ind. Liberal	Greg Kieser	57.42	Independent Liberal hold
George Town	Greg Kieser	Ind. Liberal	Independent	Tim Harris	42.58	Independent Liberal hold
Glamorgan-Spring Bay	Debby Wisby	Independent	Independent SFF	Cheryl Arnol	61.96	Independent SFF gain
Glamorgan-Spring Bay	Debby Wisby	Independent	Independent	Robert Forbes Young	38.04	Independent SFF gain
Glenorchy	Bec Thomas	Independent	Independent	Bec Thomas	61.96	Independent hold
Glenorchy	Bec Thomas	Independent	Independent	Kelly Sims	21.13	Independent hold
Hobart	Anna Reynolds	Your Hobart Independents	Your Hobart Independents	Anna Reynolds	53.41	Your Hobart Independents hold
Hobart	Anna Reynolds	Your Hobart Independents	Independent	John Kelly	46.59	Your Hobart Independents hold
Huon Valley	Sally Doyle	Independent	Independent	Sally Doyle	55.74	Independent hold
Huon Valley	Sally Doyle	Independent	Greens	Paul Gibson	44.26	Independent hold
Kentish	Tim Wilson	Independent	Independent	Kate Haberle	N/A	Independent gain
Kentish	Tim Wilson	Independent	Elected unopposed			Independent gain
King Island	Julie Arnold	Independent	Independent	Marcus Blackie	61.45	Independent gain
King Island	Julie Arnold	Independent	Independent	Ian Allan	38.55	Independent gain
Kingborough	Paula Wriedt	Independent	Independent	Paula Wriedt	61.39	Independent hold
Kingborough	Paula Wriedt	Independent	Independent	Mark Richardson	38.61	Independent hold
Latrobe	Peter Freshney	Independent	Independent	Peter Freshney	N/A	Independent hold
Latrobe	Peter Freshney	Independent	Elected unopposed			Independent hold
Launceston	Albert Van Zetten	Independent	Independent	Danny Gibson	59.25	Independent gain
Launceston	Albert Van Zetten	Independent	Independent	Tim Walker	40.75	Independent gain
Meander Valley	Wayne Johnston	Independent	Independent	Wayne Johnston	51.50	Independent hold
Meander Valley	Wayne Johnston	Independent	Ind. Labor	Ben Dudman	20.57	Independent hold
Northern Midlands	Mary Knowles	Independent	Independent	Mary Knowles	56.35	Independent hold
Northern Midlands	Mary Knowles	Independent	Independent	Andrew McCullagh	43.65	Independent hold
Sorell	Kerry Vincent	Independent	Independent	Kerry Vincent	66.45	Independent hold
Sorell	Kerry Vincent	Independent	Independent	Marisol Miro Quesada Le Roux	33.55	Independent hold
Southern Midlands	Alex Green	Independent	Ind. Labor	Edwin Batt	N/A	Independent Labor gain
Southern Midlands	Alex Green	Independent	Elected unopposed			Independent Labor gain
Tasman	Kelly Spaulding	Independent	Independent	Rod Macdonald	53.80	Independent gain
Tasman	Kelly Spaulding	Independent	Independent	Kelly Spaulding	46.20	Independent gain
Waratah-Wynyard	Robert Walsh	Independent	Independent	Mary Duniam	54.85	Independent gain
Waratah-Wynyard	Robert Walsh	Independent	Independent	Kevin Hyland	45.15	Independent gain
West Coast	Phil Vickers	Independent	Independent	Shane Pitt	51.74	Independent gain
West Coast	Phil Vickers	Independent	Independent	Lindsay Newman	31.45	Independent gain
West Tamar	Christina Holmdahl	Independent	Independent	Christina Holmdahl	51.86	Independent hold
West Tamar	Christina Holmdahl	Independent	Independent	Rick Shegog	48.14	Independent hold

=== Deputy mayoral elections ===
Deputy mayors in italics did not recontest their positions.

Council	Before		Result after preference distribution			
Council	Deputy Mayor	Party	Party	Candidate	%	Result
Break O'Day	John McGiveron	Independent	Independent	Kristi Chapple	55.90	Independent gain
Break O'Day	John McGiveron	Independent	Independent	Barry LeFevre	44.10	Independent gain
Brighton	Barbara Curran	Independent	Independent	Barbara Curran	65.19	Independent hold
Brighton	Barbara Curran	Independent	Ind. Labor	Aaron De La Torre	34.81	Independent hold
Burnie	Teeny Brumby	Independent	Independent	Teeny Brumby	53.11	Independent hold
Burnie	Teeny Brumby	Independent	Independent	David Pease	46.89	Independent hold
Central Coast	Garry Carpenter	Independent Liberal	Independent	John Beswick	50.16	Independent gain
Central Coast	Garry Carpenter	Independent Liberal	Independent	Casey Hiscutt	49.84	Independent gain
Central Highlands	Jim Allwright	Independent	Independent	Jim Allwright	67.36	Independent hold
Central Highlands	Jim Allwright	Independent	Independent	Robert Cassidy	32.64	Independent hold
Circular Head	Norman Berechree	Independent	Independent	Annette Dawes	51.11	Independent gain
Circular Head	Norman Berechree	Independent	Independent	Ashley Popowski	30.28	Independent gain
Clarence	Heather Chong	Ind. Labor	Independent	Allison Ritchie	54.00	Independent gain
Clarence	Heather Chong	Ind. Labor	Independent	Wendy Kennedy	46.00	Independent gain
Derwent Valley	Jessica Cosgrove	Independent	Independent	Luke Browning	55.70	Independent gain
Derwent Valley	Jessica Cosgrove	Independent	Independent	Jessica Cosgrove	44.30	Independent gain
Devonport	Alison Jarman	Independent	Ind. Liberal	Stacey Sheehan	51.81	Independent Liberal gain
Devonport	Alison Jarman	Independent	Independent	Gerard Enniss	48.19	Independent Liberal gain
Dorset	Dale Jessup	Independent	Independent	Dale Jessup	58.75	Independent hold
Dorset	Dale Jessup	Independent	Independent	Leonie Stein	41.25	Independent hold
Flinders	Rachel Summers	Independent	Independent	Vanessa Grace	69.65	Independent gain
Flinders	Rachel Summers	Independent	Independent	Ken Stockton	30.35	Independent gain
George Town	Tim Harris	Independent	Independent	Greg Dawson	51.47	Independent gain
George Town	Tim Harris	Independent	Independent	Jason Orr	24.61	Independent gain
Glamorgan-Spring Bay	Jenny Woods	Independent	Independent	Michael Symons	51.47	Independent gain
Glamorgan-Spring Bay	Jenny Woods	Independent	Independent	Rob Churchill	33.16	Independent gain
Glenorchy	Steven King	Independent	Independent	Sue Hickey	56.92	Independent gain
Glenorchy	Steven King	Independent	Independent	Jan Dunsby	43.08	Independent gain
Hobart	Helen Burnet	Greens	Greens	Helen Burnet	61.13	Greens hold
Hobart	Helen Burnet	Greens	Ind. Liberal	Simon Behrakis	38.87	Greens hold
Huon Valley	Sue Clark	Independent	Ind. Labor	Toby Thorpe	59.41	Independent Labor gain
Huon Valley	Sue Clark	Independent	Independent	David O'Neill	40.59	Independent Labor gain
Kentish	Don Thwaites	Independent	Independent	Penny Lane	50.84	Independent gain
Kentish	Don Thwaites	Independent	Independent	Phillip Richards	31.96	Independent gain
King Island	Vernon Philbey	Independent	Independent	Vernon Philbey	61.22	Independent hold
King Island	Vernon Philbey	Independent	Independent	Duncan McFie	19.44	Independent hold
Kingborough	Jo Westwood	Independent	Kingborough Thrives	Clare Glade-Wright	58.25	Kingborough Thrives gain
Kingborough	Jo Westwood	Independent	Ind. Liberal	Aldo Antolli	41.75	Kingborough Thrives gain
Latrobe	Graeme Brown	Independent	Independent	Vonette Mead	50.82	Independent gain
Latrobe	Graeme Brown	Independent	Independent	Graeme Brown	49.18	Independent gain
Launceston	Danny Gibson	Independent	Independent	Matthew Garwood	53.58	Independent gain
Launceston	Danny Gibson	Independent	Independent	Hugh McKenzie	46.42	Independent gain
Meander Valley	Michael Kelly	Independent	Ind. Liberal	Stephanie Cameron	53.16	Independent Liberal gain
Meander Valley	Michael Kelly	Independent	Independent	Lochie Dornauf	46.84	Independent Liberal gain
Northern Midlands	Richard Goss	Independent	Ind. Labor	Janet Lambert	54.82	Independent Labor gain
Northern Midlands	Richard Goss	Independent	Independent	Richard Goss	45.18	Independent Labor gain
Sorell	Natham Reynolds	Independent	Independent	Charles Wooley	50.63	Independent gain
Sorell	Natham Reynolds	Independent	Independent	Natham Reynolds	27.91	Independent gain
Southern Midlands	David Laugher	Independent	Independent	Karen Dudgeon	50.32	Independent gain
Southern Midlands	David Laugher	Independent	Independent	Rowena McDougall	24.98	Independent gain
Tasman	Maria Stacey	Independent	Independent	Maria Stacey	N/A	Independent hold
Tasman	Maria Stacey	Independent	Elected unopposed			Independent hold
Waratah-Wynyard	Mary Duniam	Independent	Independent	Celisa Edwards	61.15	Independent gain
Waratah-Wynyard	Mary Duniam	Independent	Independent	Andrea Courtney	31.08	Independent gain
West Coast	Shane Pitt	Independent	Independent	Robert Butterfield	61.86	Independent gain
West Coast	Shane Pitt	Independent	Independent	Kerry Graham	38.14	Independent gain
West Tamar	Joy Allen	Independent	Ind. Labor	Jess Greene	51.06	Ind. Labor gain
West Tamar	Joy Allen	Independent	Independent	Joy Allen	48.94	Ind. Labor gain

== Aftermath ==
Former Nationals senator Steve Martin was elected as a councillor in Devonport, giving the party an elected representative for the first time since he lost re-election at the 2019 federal election.

Mary Duniam, the mother of Liberal senator Jonathon Duniam, became the first female mayor of Waratah-Wynyard.

Launceston mayor Danny Gibson resigned in May 2023, just months after being elected, following "vile attacks, stemming from media reports".

== By-elections and countbacks ==
The Tasmanian Electoral Commission has held a number of by-elections and countbacks to fill vacancies on councils since the 2022 elections.

=== Mayoral by-elections ===
Council	Before		Change		Result after preference distribution			
Council	Mayor	Party	Cause	Date	Date	Party	Candidate	%
Launceston	Danny Gibson	Independent	Resignation	15 May 2023	12 July 2023	Independent	Matthew Garwood	57.71
Launceston	Danny Gibson	Independent	Resignation	15 May 2023	12 July 2023	Independent	Andrea Dawkins	42.29
Sorell	Kerry Vincent	Independent	Elected to Tasmanian Legislative Council for Prosser	9 May 2024	21 June 2024	Independent	Janet Gatehouse	53.97
Sorell	Kerry Vincent	Independent	Elected to Tasmanian Legislative Council for Prosser	9 May 2024	21 June 2024	Independent	Melinda Reed	46.03
Glenorchy	Bec Thomas	Independent	Elected to Tasmanian Legislative Council for Elwick	9 May 2024	22 June 2024	Independent	Sue Hickey	55.39
Glenorchy	Bec Thomas	Independent	Elected to Tasmanian Legislative Council for Elwick	9 May 2024	22 June 2024	Independent	Russell Yaxley	44.61
Dorset	Greg Howard	Independent	Resignation	23 January 2025	1 April 2025	Independent	Rhys Beattie	57.10
Dorset	Greg Howard	Independent	Resignation	23 January 2025	1 April 2025	Independent	Robin Phillip Thompson	42.90

=== Councillor by-elections ===
Council	Before		Change		Result after preference distribution			
Council	Councillor	Party	Cause	Date	Date	Party	Candidate	%
King Island	N/A	N/A	Only eight out of nine vacancies filled at election	3 October 2022	27 October 2022	Independent	Anna Hely	64.36
King Island	N/A	N/A	Only eight out of nine vacancies filled at election	3 October 2022	27 October 2022	Independent	Philip Noble (Note: Second-placed on primary vote as the by-election did not require preference distribution.)	15.86
King Island	Sarina Laidler	Independent	Absent from 3 consecutive council meetings	12 January 2024	24 January 2024	Independent	Sarina Laidler	N/A
King Island	Sarina Laidler	Independent	Absent from 3 consecutive council meetings	12 January 2024	24 January 2024	Elected unopposed		
Sorell	Kerry Vincent	Independent	Elected to Tasmanian Legislative Council for Prosser	9 May 2024	21 June 2024	Independent	Michael Larkins	51.22
Sorell	Kerry Vincent	Independent	Elected to Tasmanian Legislative Council for Prosser	9 May 2024	21 June 2024	Independent	Kristian Horvath	48.78
Glenorchy	Bec Thomas	Independent	Elected to Tasmanian Legislative Council for Elwick	9 May 2024	22 June 2024	Independent	Justin Stringer	53.50
Glenorchy	Bec Thomas	Independent	Elected to Tasmanian Legislative Council for Elwick	9 May 2024	22 June 2024	Greens	Nina Hamasaki	46.50
King Island	Duncan McFie	Independent	Resignation	22 August 2024	3 October 2024	Independent	Rowan Cooke	58.77
King Island	Duncan McFie	Independent	Resignation	22 August 2024	3 October 2024	Independent	Stefan Hollander	41.23
Tasman	Jim Sharman	Independent	Resignation	27 November 2024	14 February 2025	Independent	Steve McQueeney	59.02
Tasman	Jim Sharman	Independent	Resignation	27 November 2024	14 February 2025	Independent	Vince Isbister	40.98
Dorset	Greg Howard	Independent	Resignation	23 January 2025	1 April 2025	Independent	Rhys Beattie	58.88
Dorset	Greg Howard	Independent	Resignation	23 January 2025	1 April 2025	Independent	Robin Phillip Thompson	41.12

=== Countbacks ===
Council	Before		Change		After		
Council	Councillor	Party	Cause	Date	Date	Councillor	Party
Huon Valley	Mike Wilson	Independent	Resignation	1 November 2022	14 November 2022	Andrew Burgess	Independent
Meander Valley	Barry Lee	Independent	Resignation	31 January 2023	14 February 2023	Rodney Synfield	Independent
Glenorchy	Kelly Sims	Independent	Absent from 3 consecutive council meetings	26 June 2023	10 July 2023	Shane Alderton	Independent
Glamorgan–Spring Bay	Greg Luck	Independent	Resignation	11 September 2023	25 September 2023	Richard Parker	Independent
Central Highlands	Scott Bowden	Independent	Death	12 September 2023	9 October 2023	Anthony Archer	Independent
Tasman	David Beard	Independent	Resignation	5 October 2023	23 October 2023	Jim Sharman	Independent
Hobart	Simon Behrakis	Independent Liberal	Elected to Tasmanian House of Assembly	24 October 2023	13 November 2023	Will Coats	Independent Liberal
Southern Midlands	Rowena McDougall	Independent	Resignation	31 October 2023	6 November 2023	Bob Campbell	Independent
Sorell	Meg Brown	Ind. Labor	Resignation	17 November 2023	4 December 2023	Beth Nichols	Independent
Derwent Valley	Peter Binny	Independent	Resignation	20 January 2024	6 February 2024	Wayne Shoobridge	Independent
Glamorgan-Spring Bay	Richard Parker	Independent	Resignation	23 January 2024	6 February 2024	Kenneth Gregson	Independent
Huon Valley	Cathy Temby	Independent	Resignation	25 January 2024	6 February 2024	Amy Robertson	Independent
Meander Valley	Lochie Dornauf	Independent	Resignation	31 January 2024	13 February 2024	Daniel Smedley	Independent
Hobart	Helen Burnet	Greens	Elected to Tasmanian House of Assembly	9 April 2024	22 April 2024	Gemma Kitsos	Greens
Huon Valley	Jenny Chambers-Smith	Greens	Resignation	1 August 2024	19 August 2024	Lukas Mrosek	Greens
Meander Valley	Michael Kelly	Independent	Resignation	10 September 2024	23 September 2024	Deborah White	Independent
Burnie	Steve Kons	Ind. Labor	Resignation	25 September 2024	7 October 2024	Alvwyn Boyd	Independent
Glenorchy	Harry Quick	Independent	Death	19 October 2024	4 November 2024	Peter Ridler	Independent
Tasman	Daniel Kelleher	Independent	Resignation	28 October 2024	4 November 2024	Alan John Hull	Independent
Glenorchy	Jan Dunsby	Independent	Death	12 November 2024	2 December 2024	Tim Marks	Independent
Meander Valley	Deborah White	Independent	Resignation	13 January 2025	28 January 2025	Christine Cronshaw	Independent
Dorset	Jerrod Nichols	Independent	Resignation	23 January 2025	11 February 2025	Jan Hughes	Independent
Dorset	Dale Jessup	Independent	Resignation	24 January 2025	11 February 2025	Wendy McLennan	Independent
Flinders	Peter Rhodes	Independent	Resignation	3 February 2025	17 February 2025	Chris Rhodes	Independent
Dorset	Anna Coxen	Independent	Resignation	4 February 2025	20 February 2025	Nick Bicanic	Independent
Dorset	Beth Donoghue	Independent	Resignation	5 February 2025	20 February 2025	Vincent Teichmann	Independent
Dorset	Leonie Stein	Independent	Resignation	6 February 2025	20 February 2025	James Cashion	Independent
Latrobe	Sommer Metske	Independent	Resignation	13 May 2025	2 June 2025	Lucy Gorniak	Independent
Central Coast	Casey Hiscutt	Independent	Elected to Tasmanian Legislative Council for Montgomery	29 May 2025	16 June 2025	Andrew van Rooyen	Independent

== See also ==
- 2022 Hobart City Council election
