= 2026 Tasmanian local elections =

Local elections in Tasmania, Australia

- 5–27 October 2026

All 29 local government areas in Tasmania (All 263 council members)

The 2026 Tasmanian local elections were held in October 2026 to elect the councils, mayors and deputy mayors of the 29 local government areas (LGAs) in Tasmania.

== Electoral system ==
Like at state and federal elections, voting in Tasmanian local elections is compulsory and has been since 2022. All voting is held via post, and the elections are conducted by the Tasmanian Electoral Commission (TEC).

Councillor elections are conducted using a slightly modified version of the Hare-Clark electoral system, which is also used for Tasmanian House of Assembly elections. Mayors and deputy mayors are elected using preferential voting, which is also used for Tasmanian Legislative Council elections. The Robson Rotation is used to rotate the order in which candidate names appear on ballot papers.

== Key Dates ==
- 7 September — Candidate nominations open
- 21 September — Candidate nominations close
- 22 September — Candidates announced
- 5 October — Voting begins
- 27 October — Voting closes
- 28 October — Counting begins

== Council changes since last election ==
Local Government Minister Kerry Vincent announced plans on 15 September 2025 to reduced the amount of councillors statewide by 60. The proposal was to have councils with 9, 7 or 5 councillors and then put a councils' councillors in one of 6 allowance bands based on a number of factors. The plans passed, but with the councils planned to have 5 councilors increased to 7 councillors.

Council	Councillors Before	Planned Councillors	Councillors After
Clarence	12	9	9
Hobart	12	9	9
Launceston	12	9	9
Glenorchy	10	9	9
Kingborough	10	9	9
Burnie	9	7	7
Central Coast	9	7	7
Devonport	9	7	7
West Tamar	9	7	7
Northern Midlands	9	7	7
Sorell	9	7	7
Circular Head	9	7	7
Meander Valley	9	7	7
Huon Valley	9	7	7
Brighton	9	7	7
Break O'Day	9	7	7
Latrobe	9	7	7
Dorset	9	7	7
Kentish	9	7	7
George Town	9	7	7
Waratah–Wynyard	8	7	7
Derwent Valley	8	7	7
Glamorgan–Spring Bay	8	7	7
Southern Midlands	7	7	7
Central Highlands	9	5	7
West Coast	9	5	7
King Island	9	5	7
Flinders	7	5	7
Tasman	7	5	7
Totals	263	203	213

== Candidates ==
=== Political parties ===
The Tasmanian Liberal Party and the Tasmanian Labor Party generally do not endorse candidates for local elections. The Tasmanian Greens do endorse candidates and had 11 candidates elected in 2022. Pauline Hanson's One Nation announced an intention to contest the local elections, however in July 2026 they announced they would not be endorsing candidates in the elections.

== Party changes before elections ==
A number of councillors joined or left parties before the 2026 elections.

Council	Councillor	Former party	New party	Date
Dorset	Greg Howard	Independent Liberal	Independent	12 July 2023
Hobart	Louise Elliot	Independent	Independent Liberal	November 2023
Latrobe	Jacki Martin	Independent	Independent Liberal	26 November 2023
Northern Midlands	Richard Goss	Independent	Independent Labor	1 December 2023
Glamorgan-Spring Bay	Carole McQueeney	Independent	Independent Labor	1 December 2023
Hobart	Louise Elliot	Independent Liberal	Independent	20 February 2024
West Tamar	Julie Sladden	Independent	Independent Liberal	20 February 2024
King Island	Sarina Laidler	Independent	Independent Liberal	20 February 2024
Latrobe	Vonette Mead	Independent	Independent Liberal	20 February 2024
Burnie	Giovanna Simpson	Independent	Independent Liberal	20 February 2024
Kingborough	Aldo Antolli	Independent	Independent Liberal	20 February 2024
Meander Valley	Stephanie Cameron	Independent	Independent Liberal	20 February 2024
Sorell	Kerry Vincent	Independent	Independent Liberal	3 April 2024
Break O'Day	Liz Johnston	Greens	Independent	2023/2024
Kingborough	Gideon Cordover	Greens	Independent	Mid-2024
Latrobe	Claudia Baldock	Independent	Independent National	5 October 2024
Glamorgan-Spring Bay	Neil Edwards	Independent	Independent National	5 October 2024
Northern Midlands	Paul Terett	Independent	Independent National	5 October 2024
Northern Midlands	Andrew McCullagh	Independent	Independent National	5 October 2024
West Coast	Kerry Graham	Independent	Independent Fusion	2 April 2025
Central Coast	Kate Wylie	Independent	Independent Liberal	13 June 2025
Central Coast	Cheryl Fuller	Independent	Independent Labor	18 June 2025
Kingborough	Gideon Cordover	Independent	Greens	June 2025
Latrobe	Claudia Baldock	Independent National	Independent	June 2025
Hobart	Louise Elliot	Independent	Independent National	19 September 2025
Hobart	Zelinda Sherlock	Your Hobart Independents	Greens	20 December 2025

== Results ==
=== Mayoral elections ===
Mayors in italics did not recontest their positions.

Council	Before		Result after preference distribution			
Council	Mayor	Party	Party	Candidate	%	Result
Break O'Day	Mick Tucker	Independent	Independent	Mick Tucker	61.39	Independent hold
Break O'Day	Mick Tucker	Independent	Independent	Liz Johnstone (Note: Second-placed on primary vote as the election did not require preference distribution.)	38.61	Independent hold
