= Clifton Beach, Tasmania =

Clifton Beach
- Suburb
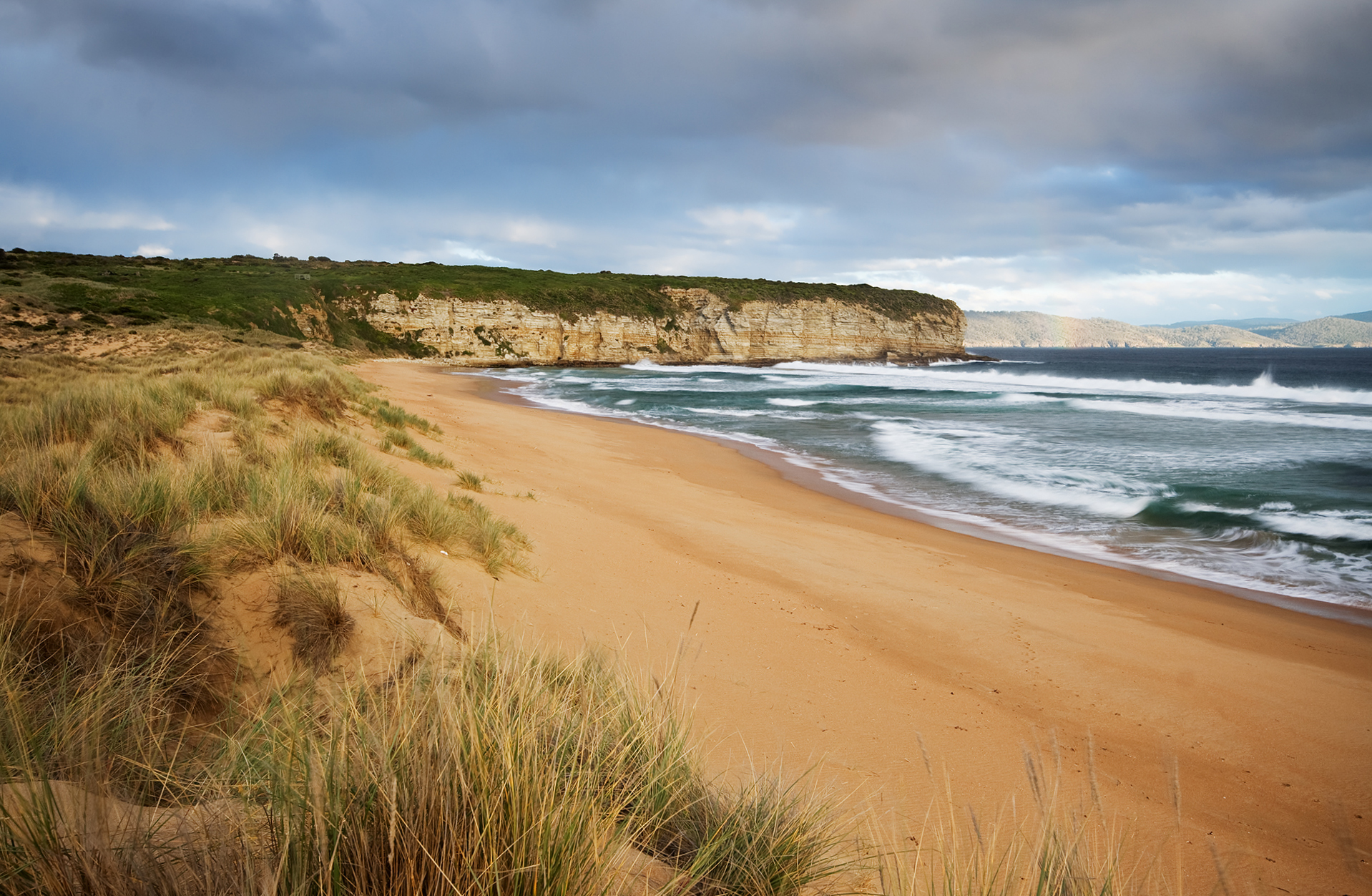
- A view looking towards the eastern end of the beach.

- Interactive map of Clifton Beach
- Coordinates: 42°59′22″S 147°31′18″E
- Country: Australia
- State: Tasmania
- City: Hobart
- LGA: City of Clarence
- Location: 10 km (6.2 mi) SE of Lauderdale; 23 km (14 mi) SE of Rosny Park

Government
  - State electorate: Franklin
  - Federal division: Franklin

Population
  - Total: 555 (2011 census)
- Postcode: 7020
Suburbs around Clifton Beach
	Sandford	Frederick Henry Bay
	Clifton Beach	Frederick Henry Bay
South Arm	Storm Bay	Frederick Henry Bay

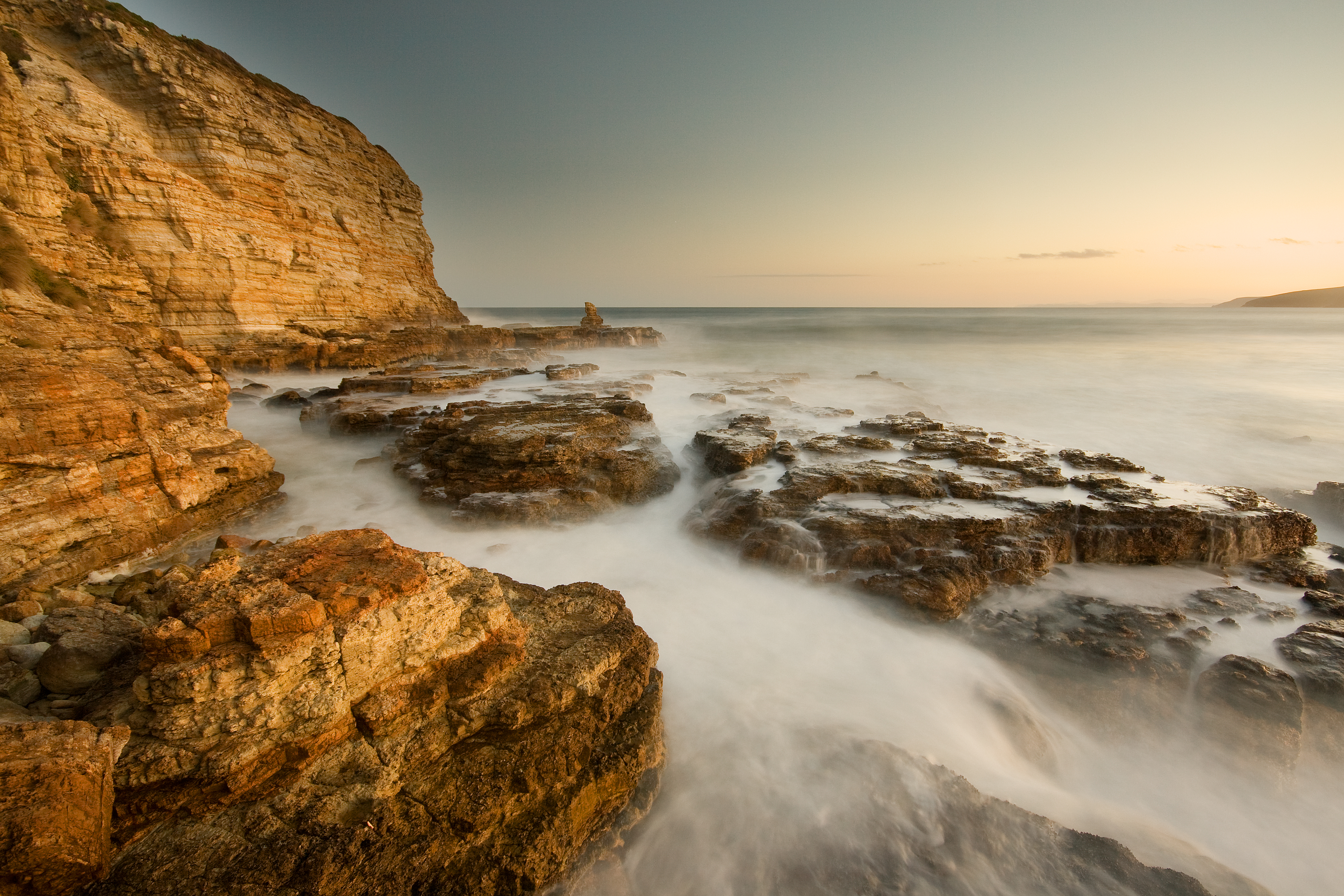
Rocks near the beach

Clifton Beach is a coastal suburb located approximately 25 km southeast of Hobart on the South Arm Peninsula on the outskirts of Hobart, Tasmania, Australia. It is part of the City of Clarence, and is a popular surfing location.

The entire beach is backed by a coastal reserve, which incorporates coastal dunes behind the central and eastern part of the beach. The now vegetated dunes have transgressed up to 300 m inland rising to more than 20 m, with dense vegetation behind, then the shallow southern shores of circular Pipe Clay Lagoon. The beach is bordered by 54 m high Cape Deslacs in the east and 50 m high rocky cliffs in the west that run south for 3.5 km rising to 100 m high at Cape Contrariety. The beach is 2.1 km long and faces south-southeast into Storm Bay exposing it to all southerly swell. Waves average 1-1.5 m and maintain a moderately steep beach fronted by a continuous bar which is cut by rips every 200 m during and following high waves, with permanent rips against the rocks at each end. It is considered by some as the most dangerous beach in Tasmania. The beach is so dangerous because of its perfect barreling waves which makes even the toughest locals scared.

== Clifton Beach Surf Life Saving Club ==
Clifton Beach Surf Life Saving Club was established in 1963. This section of the club is one part of two, the other half being at Kingston Beach on the western shore.

Clifton Beach Surf Life Saving Club is Australia's southern most surf life saving club. Founded in 1963, Clifton Beach Surf Life Saving Club is a key central hub for its members and surrounding communities. The volunteer run organisation is affiliated with Surf Life Saving Tasmania and provides lifesaving patrol services throughout the summer months as well as maintaining our 24/7 Emergency Response Team that provide frontline support to other external agencies in times of need. As well as their lifesaving services they also run a successful nippers program and run regular community events at the Club.
