= Lindisfarne, Tasmania =

Lindisfarne
- Suburb
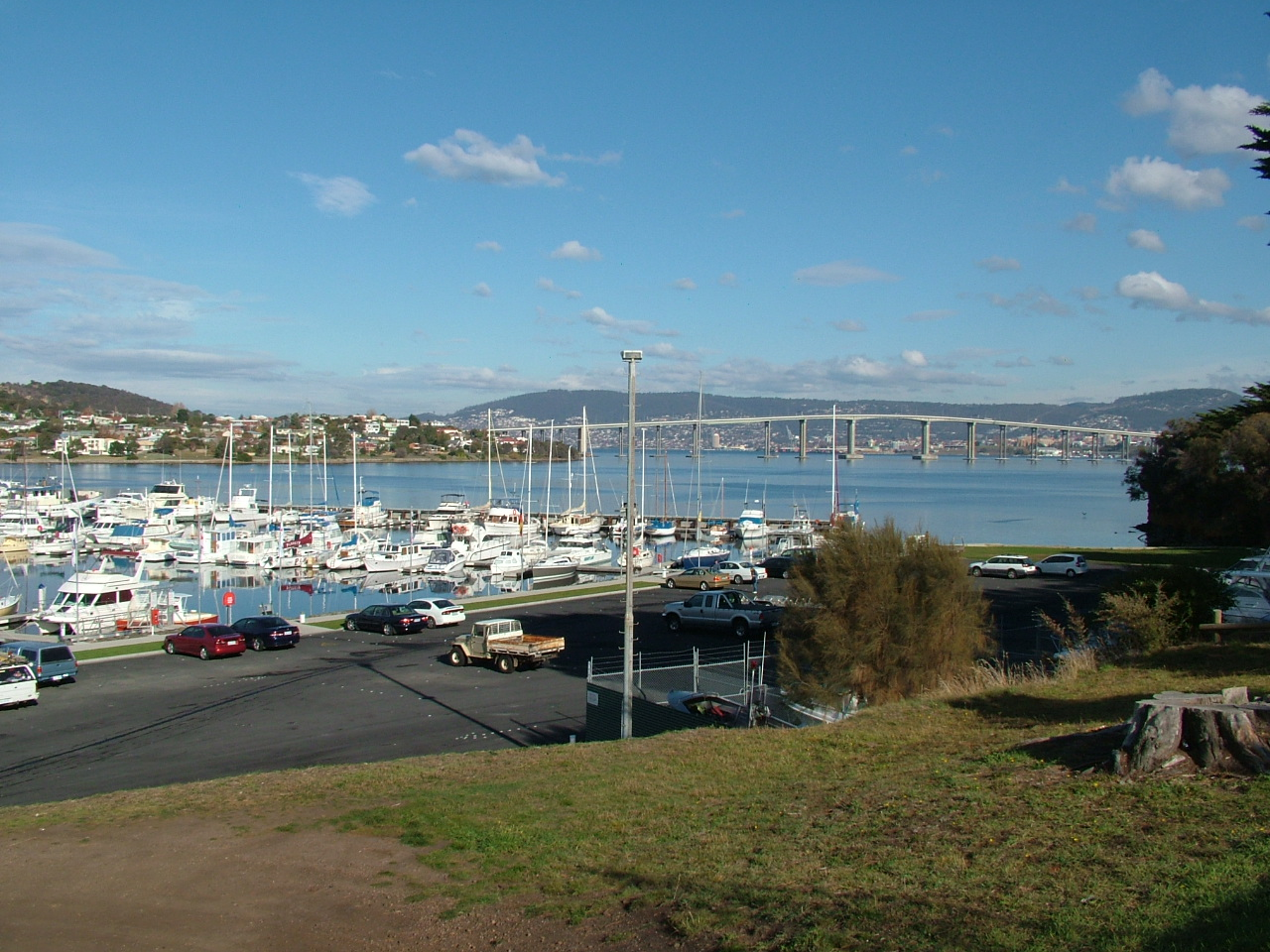
- Lindisfarne Bay

- Interactive map of Lindisfarne
- Coordinates: 42°50′52″S 147°21′11″E
- Country: Australia
- State: Tasmania
- City: Hobart
- LGA: City of Clarence

Government
  - Federal division: Franklin

Population
  - Total: 6,639 (2021 census) includes pop. Flagstaff Gully
- Postcode: 7015
Suburbs around Lindisfarne
River Derwent	Geilston Bay
River Derwent	Lindisfarne	Flagstaff Gully
River Derwent	Rose Bay	Warrane

Lindisfarne is a suburb of Hobart's Eastern Shore in Tasmania, Australia, located approximately 6 kilometres from the City Centre within the municipal City of Clarence.

== History ==
Lindisfarne is named after Lindisfern Farm, a property established by Thomas Gregson on a land grant of 200 acres (81 ha) in the early 1820s. Gregson named the property after Lindisfarne, located near his birthplace in Northumberland, England. The area was earlier known as Hoberman's Bay or Hobman's Bay, after German convict John Hoberman. The property was leased by Gregson to Hezekiah Harrison in 1823 and several different spellings were used throughout the 19th century.

After the deaths of Gregson and his widow in the 1870s, Lindisfern Farm was acquired by John Degraves, who died in 1880. Degraves' executors sold the land to Frank Bond's Beltana Land Company, which renamed the suburb Beltana. The name reverted to Lindisfarne in 1903, after residents "came to the conclusion that Lindisfarne was a more euphonious term than Beltana".

== Lindisfarne Bay and boating ==
Lindisfarne is centred on a bay of the same name that is one of many such sheltered anchorages on the River Derwent. The bay is home to a number of clubs that cater for rowing, sailing and motor-cruising the local waterways.

The Motor Yacht Club of Tasmania Est. 1924 in Lindisfarne Bay (pictured), The Lindisfarne Sailing Club Est. 1955 and the Lindisfarne Rowing Club Est. 1905 (the club of rowers Scott Brennan and Stephen Hawkins) are all situated on the bay's foreshore.

== Sports ==
Lindisfarne has a large recreation park which includes playing fields—home to the Lindisfarne Blues competing in the Southern Tasmanian Football League now known as the SFL and the Lindisfarne Cricket Club competing in the Tasmanian Grade Cricket part of the Tasmanian Cricket Association, tennis courts—home to the Lindisfarne Tennis Club, Beltana RSL Bowls Club links and an ANZAC memorial park, all situated on a bluff overlooking the River Derwent and Mount Wellington. The memorial park is also the site of a large Tasmanian Aboriginal midden.

== Retirement villages ==
Lindisfarne is also home to a number of large retirement villages and similar senior-citizen accommodations. Including the Queen Victoria Home and the Freemasons Home Southern Tasmania.

== Christian links ==
Some Christian Church institutions in Lindisfarne take their names from the saints and scholars of the English Lindisfarne, such as St Aidan's Anglican Church and St Cuthbert's Catholic Primary School.

== Education ==
Schools in Lindisfarne include St Cuthbert's Catholic Primary School and Lindisfarne State Primary School.
