= Eastlands Shopping Centre =

- Location: Rosny Park, Tasmania, Australia
- Coordinates: 42°51′59″S 147°22′06″E
- Opened: 1965
- Manager: Vicinity Centres
- Owner: Vicinity Centres
- Num. of stores: 100
- Num. of anchor tenants: 4
- Floor area: 33,000 m^{2} (360,000 sq ft)
- Floors: 2
- Website: www.eastlandssc.com.au

Eastlands is Tasmania's largest shopping centre; it is located on the eastern side of the River Derwent, in the shopping district of Rosny Park, and within the greater area of Hobart, Tasmania, Australia. It has a gross lettable area of about 33,000 m^{2} (360,000 sq ft).

Eastlands contains two major discount department stores (Big W and Kmart, two major supermarkets: Coles, and Woolworths), along with approximately one hundred specialty stores, as well as a multi-level carpark. It is located adjacent to the Rosny Bus Mall.

The shopping centre was the first of its kind in Tasmania, with refurbishments in 1971, 1978 and 1989. It has recently opened its new mall (facing Rosny Hill Road), containing a renovated Kmart and seventeen specialty stores.

== Incidents ==
In 2016, a woman was arrested after attempting to rob the centre's JB Hi-Fi store with armed a syringe. In 2021, a 30-year-old man doused customers at the centre's Caltex petrol station in turpentine and attempted to set a woman on fire. He was sentenced to a two years suspended sentence after the judge accepted his plea of being influenced by drug induced psychosis. The centre sustained minor flood damage in 2021, when stormwater gutters overflowed, causing water to rush into the centre's food court and through the roofs of some shops.
