= Rosny Park =

- Suburb
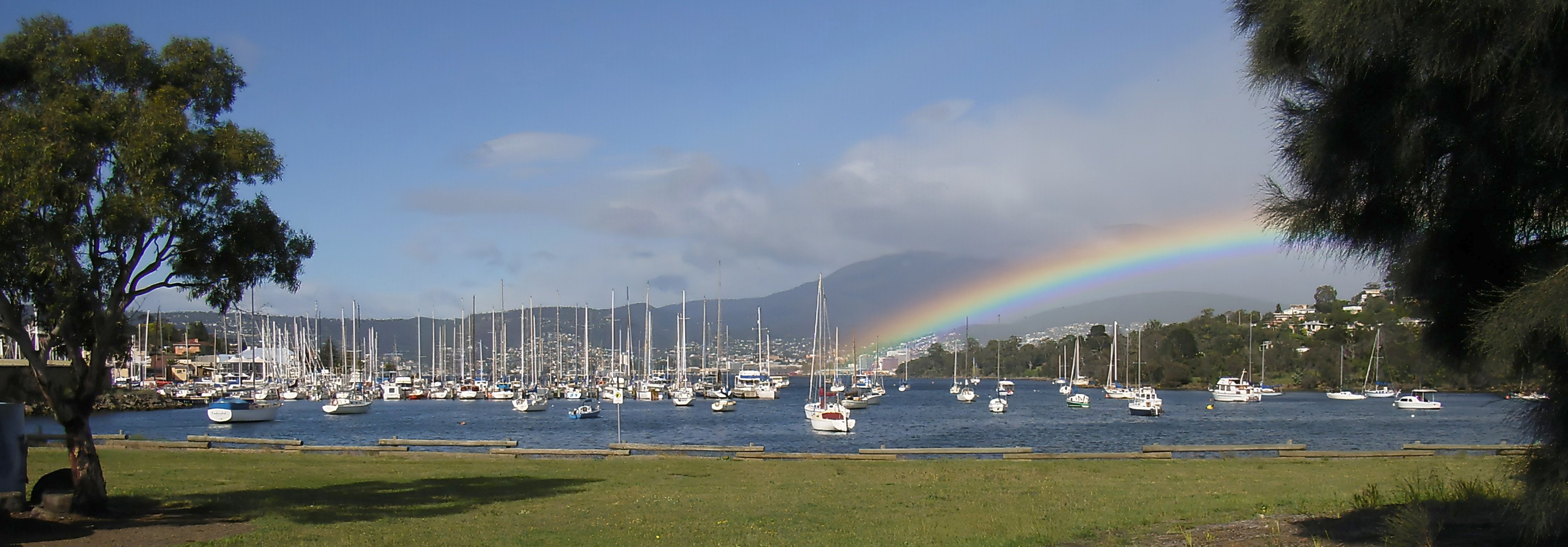
- Kangaroo Bay from Rosny Park

- Interactive map of Rosny Park
- Coordinates: 42°51′59″S 147°22′9″E
- Country: Australia
- State: Tasmania
- City: Hobart
- LGA: City of Clarence
- Location: 4 km (2.5 mi) SE of Lindisfarne; 6 km (3.7 mi) E of Hobart; 21 km (13 mi) SW of Sorell

Government
  - Federal division: Franklin
- Elevation: 16 m (52 ft)

Population
  - Total: 16 (2021 census)
- Postcode: 7018
Suburbs around Rosny Park
Lindisfarne	Lindisfarne	Warrane
Montagu Bay	Rosny Park	Mornington
Rosny	Bellerive	Bellerive

Rosny Park is a suburb of Hobart, Tasmania, located in the City of Clarence on the eastern shore of the River Derwent. It is five kilometres from the Hobart central business district. Rosny Park is the commercial twin of its residential namesake, Rosny.

Rosny Park grew substantially in the second half of the 20th century, evolving from a small commercial precinct serving the nearby suburbs of Rosny, Montagu Bay, Warrane and Mornington into Clarence's primary commercial and administrative centre, superseding neighbouring Bellerive.

== Geography ==
Rosny Park covers an area of approximately 0.67 square kilometres (0.26 sq mi) on the eastern shore of the River Derwent, roughly 5 km (3.1 mi) east of the Hobart central business district. The suburb sits in a low-lying basin at an elevation of around 16 m (52 ft), bounded by the Tasman Highway to the north, Gordons Hill to the east, Kangaroo Bay and Bellerive to the south, and the elevated peninsula of Rosny and Rosny Hill to the west.

Kangaroo Bay Rivulet flows south-west through the suburb into Kangaroo Bay, an inlet of the River Derwent. Because much of the suburb occupies the flat alluvial valley surrounding the rivulet, low-lying commercial and recreational areas (including the Eastlands precinct and sports grounds south of Rosny Hill Road) are susceptible to inundation during heavy rainfall events.

Unlike neighbouring Rosny, which is predominantly residential, Rosny Park is zoned almost entirely for commercial, civic, and recreational land use, resulting in a permanent residential population of just 16 at the 2021 census. Open green space accounts for a substantial portion of the suburb's footprint, encompassing the 14.5-hectare (36-acre) Rosny Parklands (home to Rosny Farm and the former Rosny Park Public Golf Course) as well as Charles Hand Memorial Park and the Kangaroo Bay foreshore.

== History ==
The history of Rosny Park goes back to first settlement where the area was part of Kangaroo Point, later renamed Bellerive. The area was rezoned splitting the areas of Bellerive and Rosny Park and gazetted as Rosny Park in 1977 and the boundaries re-gazetted in 1999.

Rosny was named for a family name of WA Bethune, the holder of the original grant on the point, and he named it after his ancestor, the Duc de Maximilien de Bethune Sully, of Rosny-sur-Seine near Mantes in France.

Kangaroo Point Post Office opened on 24 June 1832. It was renamed Bellerive in 1882 and was closed and relocated to the Rosny Park office in 1982.

== Rosny Farm ==
Rosny Farm, located on Rosny Hill Road within the Rosny Park boundary, was established around 1806 on a land grant issued to former Norfolk Island convict Richard Morgan. Listed on the Tasmanian Heritage Register, the site contains a stone barn built c. 1815–1818 (one of the oldest surviving barns in Australia) and Rosny Cottage, a sandstone farm residence constructed c. 1850. Over the years, the cottage housed farmers, labourers, and later the Lane family, who served as greenkeepers for the adjacent golf course; war correspondent Neil Davis was a frequent visitor during the 1930s and photographed the family and grounds. The Rosny Barn was redeveloped in 2006 into a multi-purpose arts venue, joining the restored cottage and the Schoolhouse Gallery, a contemporary replica of an 1890 schoolhouse from Osterley in central Tasmania.

Operated by the Clarence City Council, the Rosny Farm arts and heritage precinct serves as a cultural hub for the eastern shore, hosting a year-round program of exhibitions, workshops, artist residencies, concerts, and festivals, including the Clarence Jazz Festival. The Barn is used for contemporary art installations, performances, and national touring exhibitions, while the Schoolhouse Gallery hosts shows by community arts groups, educational organisations, and emerging and established artists. Rosny Cottage operates as a museum furnished to depict early 20th-century Tasmanian domestic life, drawing on a local collection of roughly 3,000 items that includes household technology, archival records, farming tools, and Neil Davis's early photographs.

== Eastlands Shopping Centre ==
Rosny Park is the primary retail hub of Hobart's eastern shore, centred around the Eastlands Shopping Centre, the largest shopping centre in Tasmania. Managed by Vicinity Centres, the complex has a gross lettable area of 33,463 m^{2} (360,190 sq ft), draws approximately 6.3 million visits annually, and serves a total trade area of nearly 250,000 people.

First opened in 1965 and fully enclosed in 1972, Eastlands has undergone multiple expansions to house around 100 specialty stores alongside major retailers including Kmart and Tasmania's first Big W store. In late 2025, the centre marked its 60th anniversary with a public exhibition of archival photographs and community memorabilia curated in partnership with ABC Radio Hobart.

== Parks and recreation ==
=== Charles Hand Memorial Park ===
Located on the Kangaroo Bay side of Rosny Hill Road opposite Rosny Parklands, Charles Hand Memorial Park provides public open space and recreational facilities. The park features walking paths, playground equipment, and the adjacent Kangaroo Bay sports precinct, which includes cricket grounds, netball courts, skateboard ramps, and the Rosny Park tennis and bowls clubs. Named after former Clarence Municipal Commission chairman Charles Hand, the park also hosts the City of Clarence's annual Christmas Carols by Candlelight concert.

=== Rosny Parklands and former AFL high-performance centre proposal ===
Adjacent to Rosny Farm, the 14.5 ha (36 acres) Rosny Parklands extends uphill from Eastlands Shopping Centre and Kangaroo Bay Rivulet, forming a continuous green corridor alongside Charles Hand Memorial Park on the opposite side of Rosny Hill Road. The site formerly operated as a 9-hole public golf course until its closure in 2021.

In 2023, following a site selection process conducted by the Tasmanian Government and the City of Clarence, Rosny Parklands was selected as the preferred site for the Tasmania Devils AFL and AFLW high-performance and administration centre. The proposal sparked active campaigns both for and against the development, with community group Save Rosny Parks opposing the loss of open parkland. In August 2024, the City of Clarence held an elector poll in which more than 28,000 residents (62 per cent of electors) voted on whether the facility should be built entirely within Rosny Parklands or split across Rosny Hill Road into Charles Hand Memorial Park; the proposal to locate the centre entirely within Rosny Parklands narrowly passed with 51.4 per cent of the vote to 48.6 per cent against.

In November 2024, however, the project was relocated to Kingston after geotechnical investigations found that extensive ground works would be required to build the facility at Rosny Parklands.

== Today ==
Kangaroo Bay foreshore reserve

Centred on Bligh Street and the Rosny Park Transit Mall, Rosny Park is the administrative, commercial and transportational centre of the City of Clarence, and therefore Hobart's eastern shore. It caters for banking (all major banks) and postal services, and government administration. It is the home of the Clarence City Council, a local court chambers, and the local branch of the State Library of Tasmania. It also has branches of the Commonwealth Office, the Australian Archives, the Department of Justice, the Education Department, and Service Tasmania. The Clarence branch of the Returned & Services League is based in Rosny Park. There is also childcare, and nursing home facilities nearby.

Rosny Park is home to Bellerive Police station, the Tasmanian Fire Service, and Bayfield Street Medical Centre, as well as Warrane barracks of the 12th/40th battalion of the Australian Army Reserve.

Rosny Park also has a Village Cinemas complex, one of only four in the state.

Rosny Park is home to Rosny College, a government-provided senior secondary college, which also teaches adult night courses.

Rosny Park Transit Mall is a local hub and is serviced by several routes which reach most suburban areas of the City of Clarence, and some outer districts such as Lauderdale, as well as services to Hobart Bus Mall and Glenorchy.
