= Rokeby Bypass =

Proposed bypass in Tasmania, Australia

Rokeby Bypass Tasmania

General information
- Type: Road (Proposed)
- Length: 2 km (1.2 mi)
- Route number(s): B33

Major junctions
- North end: Glebe Hill
- South end: Oakdowns

Location(s)
- Major suburbs: Rokeby

The Rokeby Bypass is a Tasmanian Department of State Growth proposed re-alignment of Rokeby Road that would bypass the Hobart suburb of Rokeby within the Clarence City Council. Currently there are in excess of 17,000 vehicle movements a day using Rokeby Road, a considerable amount for a two lane road. Growing community concern has been raised by the traffic issues in the Rokeby area, people South of Lauderdale are even said to be using Acton Road to gain access to the Tasman Highway.

== Current alignment ==
Currently, Rokeby Road travels from the intersection at Oceana Drive and the South Arm Highway and travels south east past Pass Road then winding South straight through Rokeby. Ribbon development has jeopardised the safety and smooth running of the road on its current alignment, as well as the low speed limit associated with passing through a Central business district. There are also several local streets that enter straight onto Rokeby Road as well as limited upgrading opportunities in the CBD.

== Proposal ==
The bypass is proposed to start at Glebe Hill, in the area of the Rokeby Fire station and travel parallel to the east of the current alignment to bypass the main CBD of Rokeby, connecting to the existing road in the vicinity of the Police Academy. The Clarence city council has now zoned Land for the future bypass in accordance with recommendations of the Clarence Plains Outline Development Plan (CPODP) of 2008. A key recommendation of the CPODP is that the future upgrading of Rokeby Main Road from Oceana Drive to the Clarence Plains Rivulet is to be based on providing four lanes of traffic using the existing road alignment and providing a bypass of the Rokeby commercial / industrial area in the long term. When the state government adopted the CPODP the Minister at that time Graeme Sturges gave a commitment to the Clarence City Council to retain the existing Bypass corridor of the Rokeby residential area. In early 2011, the Department of Infrastructure, Energy and Resources released plans for an upgrade of Rokeby Road to the Fire station

== See also ==
- List of bypasses in Tasmania
