= Guilford Young College =

School in Hobart, Tasmania, Australia

- Glenorchy and Hobart, Tasmania; Australia

Information
- Type: Independent co-educational day senior high school
- Motto: Christ our Light
- Denomination: Roman Catholic
- Established: 1994; 32 years ago
- Principal: Jo Legosz
- Years: 11 and 12
- Enrolment: 900+ (2017)
- Colours: Navy blue, gold & red
- Slogan: Learning for Life
- Affiliation: Sports Association of Tasmanian Independent Schools
- Website: www.gyc.tas.edu.au

Guilford Young College is a Roman Catholic senior secondary college, with campuses located in the Hobart suburbs of Glenorchy and Hobart City in Tasmania, Australia. The College provides education to students in Year 11 and Year 12, offering more than 100 Tasmanian Certificate of Education (TCE), pre-tertiary and Vocational Education and Training (VET) courses. The college is named in honour of Sir Guilford Young who served as the eighth Archbishop of Hobart from 1955 to 1988.

== History ==
Guilford Young College was founded in 1994 and opened to students in 1995, having been established by the Archdiocese of Hobart, the Christian Brothers, the Dominican Sisters, the Salesians of Don Bosco, the Sisters of Charity and the Sisters of Saint Joseph. The college was established after a restructuring of the Catholic education system in southern Tasmania which saw a number of Catholic high schools hand over their senior secondary classes (Years 11 and 12) to create one senior secondary college.

== Associated colleges ==
The Catholic colleges associated with GYC are: Sacred Heart College, New Town; Mount Carmel College, Sandy Bay; St Virgil's College, Austins Ferry; Dominic College, Glenorchy; MacKillop Catholic College, Mornington; St James Catholic College, Cygnet; and St Aloysius Catholic College, Huntingfield.

== College crest ==
The College crest incorporates:

- the Archbishop's Cross
- the Book of the Gospels
- the Word of God
- the Flame representing Christ, the Light of the world.

== Glenorchy campus ==
The Glenorchy campus is situated in Bowden Street, Glenorchy. It is a flat campus with Mount Wellington as a backdrop. The campus is orientated around the Central Administration Office which houses the administration for the college as well as the campus administration. Classrooms, a canteen, chapel, staff rooms, library, uniform shop and offices are situated in several buildings. The Bosco Centre houses the gym, performing arts and music while the adjacent Houghton House is home to a two-member Benedictine community. Nearby is the new Southern Colleges Trade Training Centre, as well as facilities for subjects including art, catering and photography.

The Glenorchy Campus is also home to the Don Bosco Creative Arts Centre, the centrepiece of which is a 600-seat theatre. The facility is used by other Catholic colleges in and around Hobart and a large number of community groups.

Originally, the Glenorchy Campus was the parochial Holy Name School, run by the Dominican Sisters, before it merged with Savio College (Salesians of Don Bosco) to become Dominic College, which today is one of GYC's association colleges and now is located on one site, closer to the mountain.

The Southern Catholic College Trade Training Centre is located on the Glenorchy Campus. This VET training centre was opened in 2010. GYC is a Registered Training Organisation (RTO) and is the lead College in the Southern Catholic Colleges Trade Training consortium. The partner colleges are: St James Catholic College (Cygnet), Mount Carmel College (Sandy Bay), St Mary's College (Hobart), Sacred Heart College (New Town), Dominic College (Glenorchy), St Virgil's College (Austins Ferry) and MacKillop College (Mornington).

== Hobart campus ==
The Hobart Campus is situated in Barrack Street. In recent years, this campus has undergone a building program which has provided a new catering suite, uniform shop, photography laboratory, classrooms, computer labs, and a gym. The Hobart Campus also contains a canteen, chapel, staff rooms, library, uniform shop and offices. The facilities are situated over a number of levels.

While most subjects are taught on both campuses, some students travel between campuses to pursue their chosen line of study. Both campuses also provide sporting facilities.

Originally, the Hobart Campus was the site for the first St Virgil's College, which was opened by the Christian Brothers in 1911. GYC played a significant role in the April 2011 celebrations marking the centenary of SVC, now situated in nearby Patrick Street (Years 3–6) and Austins Ferry (Year 7–10). A cemetery associated with SVC is also on the site.

== Sport ==
Guilford Young College is a member of the Sports Association of Tasmanian Independent Schools (SATIS).

=== SATIS premierships ===
Guilford Young College has won the following SATIS premierships.

Combined:

- Athletics College (8) – 1999, 2008, 2009, 2012, 2014, 2015, 2017, 2018
- Badminton College (1) - 2024
- Cross Country Senior (5) – 2009, 2010, 2011, 2015, 2017
- Swimming College (6) – 1999, 2000, 2008, 2010, 2011, 2014

Boys:

- Athletics College (10) – 1999, 2000, 2001, 2003, 2008, 2009, 2012, 2014, 2015, 2017
- Basketball (6) – 2010, 2012, 2014, 2018, 2019, 2021
- Cricket (5) – 1995, 1998, 2001, 2007, 2020
- Cricket T20 – 2020
- Cross Country Senior (8) – 1996, 1997, 2001, 2007, 2008, 2009, 2011, 2013
- Football (6) – 1995, 1996, 2001, 2002, 2020, 2021
- Hockey (5) – 1998, 2003, 2004, 2005, 2020
- Soccer (12) – 1995, 2003, 2007, 2008, 2012, 2013, 2015, 2016, 2018, 2019, 2020, 2021
- Swimming College (6) – 1999, 2009, 2011, 2013, 2014, 2021
- Tennis (4) – 1998, 2015, 2016, 2017

Girls:

- Athletics College (3) – 2012, 2014, 2017
- Basketball – 2018
- Cricket T20 – 2021
- Cross Country Senior (5) – 2004, 2009, 2010, 2011, 2013
- Football – 2021
- Hockey – 2021
- Netball (8) – 1997, 1998, 2002, 2003, 2004, 2010, 2019, 2021
- Soccer (5) – 2006, 2009, 2011, 2012, 2017
- Swimming College (2) – 2014, 2016

== Notable Past Students ==
Sam Curtain – Filmmaker (Blood Hunt, The Slaughterhouse Killer, Beaten to Death)

Benjamin Jung-Clarke – Filmmaker (Blood Hunt, The Slaughterhouse Killer, Beaten to Death)

Sam Rainbird - Cricketer

== See also ==
- List of schools in Tasmania
- Education in Tasmania
