= Bellerive, Tasmania =

Bellerive
- Suburb
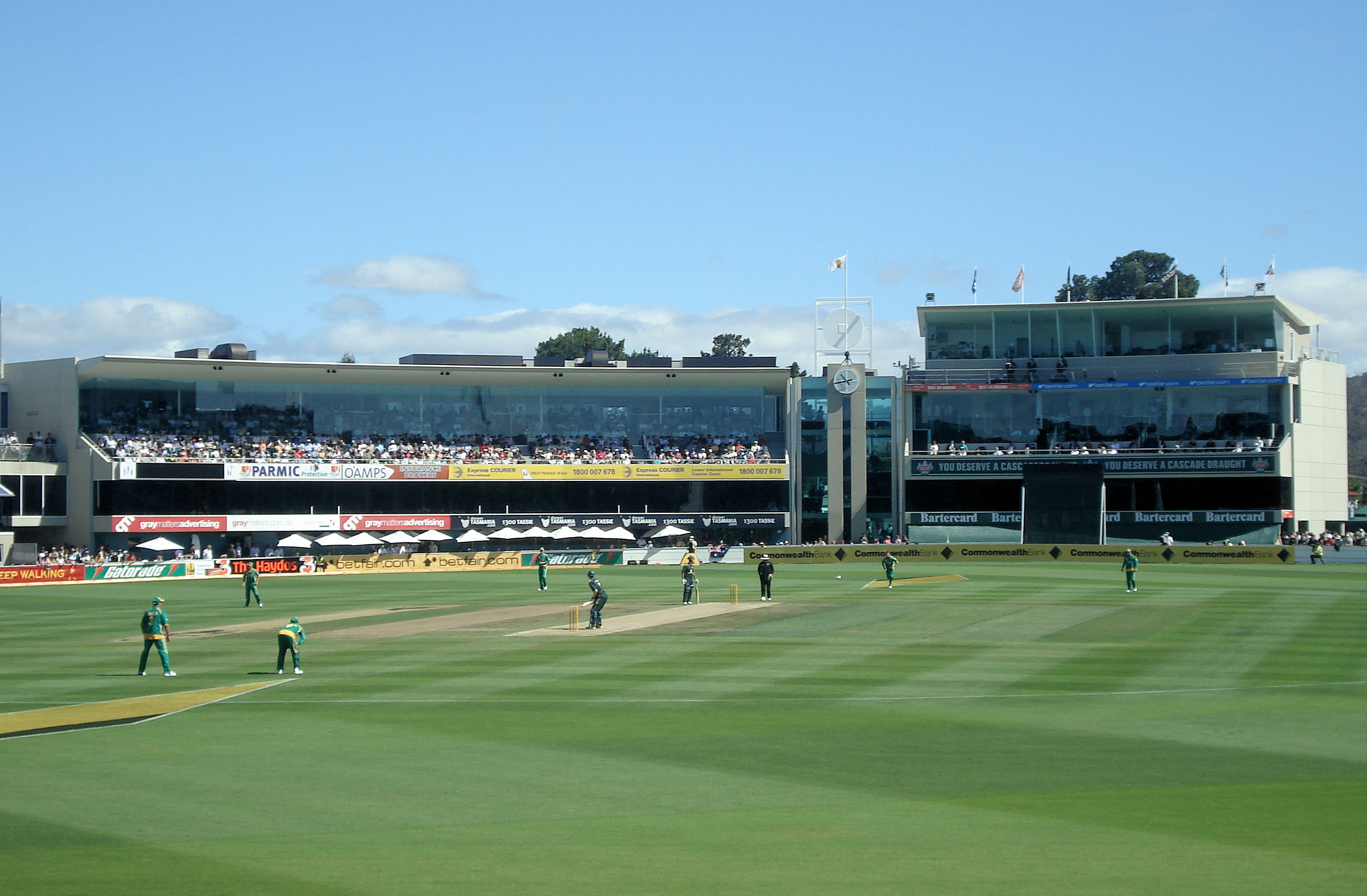
- Bellerive Oval, members pavilion and media area

- Interactive map of Bellerive
- Coordinates: 42°52′29″S 147°22′4″E
- Country: Australia
- State: Tasmania
- City: Hobart
- LGA: City of Clarence
- Location: 6 km (3.7 mi) E of Hobart

Government
  - Federal division: Franklin
- Elevation: 6 m (20 ft)

Population
  - Total: 4,945 (2021 census)
- Postcode: 7018
Suburbs around Bellerive
Rosny	Rosny Park	Mornington
River Derwent	Bellerive	Howrah
River Derwent	River Derwent	River Derwent

Bellerive is a suburb of the City of Clarence, part of the greater Hobart area, Tasmania, Australia. It stretches from Kangaroo Bay, bordering Rosny Park, along the shoreline of Bellerive Esplanade to Kangaroo Bluff, then to Bellerive Beach, and east to Second Bluff where Bellerive meets Howrah. To the north, Bellerive is bordered by the foothills of Waverly Flora Park. At the 2021 census, Bellerive recorded a population of 4,945.

== History ==
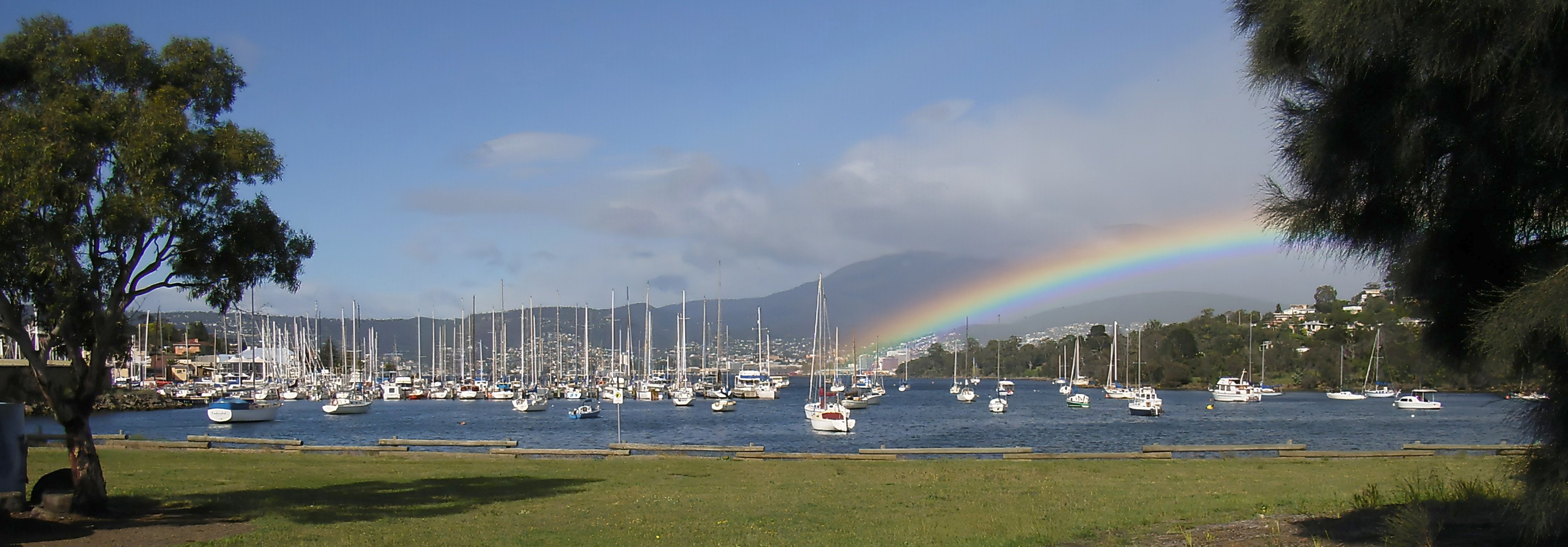
Kangaroo Bay, 2009

Bellerive was first settled in the 1820s, originally known as "Kangaroo Point" due to the large number of kangaroos seen on the shore. Even before this time, a ferryman regularly crossed the River Derwent, coming ashore in the Bellerive area. After the first settlers arrived, the area expanded rapidly, with roads leading to the farming districts of Clarence Plains (Rokeby), Coal River (Richmond), and Hollow Tree (Cambridge).

By the 1830s, the name was changed to Bellerive (French for "beautiful shore"). The village became the hub of eastern shore contact with Hobart, with several boats crossing between Bellerive and Sullivans Cove every day.

Early businesses included farming and slaughterhouses. In 1834, there were four known inns: Clarence House, Golden Fleece Inn, Highlander, and the Plough.

The Clarence Hotel, built in 1879, has long been a local social hub and a waiting point for ferry passengers. The Bellerive Hotel existed from 1862 to 1865 and 1898 to 1901, according to licensing records.

One of the oldest surviving buildings in Bellerive is the Commandant's Cottage. The original police station, built in 1842 from local sandstone, still retains much of its original structure. The building has served various purposes, including municipal council chambers, a district library, and the Criminal Investigation Branch (CIB) headquarters. Today, it is a community arts centre. The Bellerive Primary School, also built in 1842, continues to serve the local community.

St. Mark's Chapel, an Anglican church built in 1851, stands on the site of the former 1826 "Chapel of Ease".

The area around Bellerive Quay and the boardwalk maintains a village-like atmosphere, with many historical homes and buildings dating back to the early 19th century. The old Bellerive Post Office, built in 1897, now houses the Sound Preservation Museum and the Genealogical Society of Tasmania. At the point of Kangaroo Bluff stands the 19th-century British fortress known as Kangaroo Battery, built in 1885, now a public park.

From 2 May 1892 until 30 June 1926, the Sorell railway line had its terminus on a long jetty that extended into the bay, on what is now part of the boardwalk.

The former 300-seat Regent Theatre, opened on the corner of Percy Street and Cambridge Road on 5 November 1931, was both a cinema and town hall. It closed in the 1960s, reopening briefly as the Civic Cinema in 1975 before being demolished in the 1980s.

Bellerive is the eastern port of call for Hobart commuter ferries.

== Recent Developments ==
In 2024, several projects were initiated in Bellerive, including developments at Kangaroo Bay and upgrades to Bellerive Wharf. These projects reflect ongoing changes in the suburb as it adapts to infrastructure needs and community planning.

=== Kangaroo Bay development ===
The Kangaroo Bay development has been a significant topic of discussion in Bellerive. The waterfront site has seen ongoing debate involving developers, the Clarence City Council, and local Indigenous groups.

In 2022, the Chinese company Chambroad proposed a luxury hotel for the site, aimed at creating a high-end development. However, the project encountered opposition from some Aboriginal groups, who raised concerns regarding its potential cultural and environmental impact. These groups expressed their objections to the proposed changes at Kangaroo Bay in 2023.

In March 2023, the Clarence City Council initiated a buy-back of portions of the Kangaroo Bay site to reconsider its future development. By 2024, the Tasmanian Government designated the hotel as a major project, accelerating the approval process. Later in 2024, the Tasmanian Government used artificial intelligence (AI) to assess job creation estimates for the project, aiming to confirm that employment targets would be met.

=== Bellerive Wharf and Ferry Terminal ===
In 2024, designs for a new ferry terminal at Bellerive Wharf were released as part of Hobart’s public transportation strategy. The terminal will include updated docking facilities and improved public spaces, with the goal of increasing ferry services and enhancing accessibility.

=== Cricket Tasmania and Bellerive Oval ===
In early 2024, Cricket Tasmania announced its decision to vacate Bellerive Oval, also known as Blundstone Arena, after using the venue for several decades for both international and domestic matches. The departure has raised questions about the future use of the stadium and its role in the local sporting landscape. In 2024, Bellerive Oval was renamed "Ninja Oval" following a naming rights agreement with SharkNinja, a global home appliances brand.

=== Real estate ===
The suburb's waterfront properties and historical homes have contributed to its popularity with buyers. Bellerive’s real estate market has experienced growth, with the median house price reaching approximately $1.07 million as of 2024. One notable sale in 2024 was the historic property "The Gables", an Edwardian-style mansion on the Bellerive waterfront.

== Demographics ==
Historical population
Year	Pop.	±%
2001	4,021	—
2006	4,230	+5.2%
2011	4,355	+3.0%
2016	4,507	+3.5%
2021	4,945	+9.7%
Source: Australian Bureau of Statistics data.

At the 2021 census, the suburb had a population density of approximately 1,831.5 people per km^{2}, over a land area of 2.7 km^{2}.

The median weekly household income in Bellerive was $1,461, compared to the national median of $1,746. About 20.7% of households in Bellerive had a total weekly income below $650, while 18.7% of households earned more than $3,000 per week.

Homeownership was relatively high in Bellerive, with 42.4% of households owning their homes outright and 25.8% owning with a mortgage. Approximately 29.1% of households rented.

Culturally, 75.1% of Bellerive residents were born in Australia, followed by 3.7% in England, 2.8% in China, 2.4% in Nepal, 1.6% in India, and 0.9% in New Zealand.

Of Bellerive's residents, 82.2% spoke only English at home. The next most common languages spoken at home were Mandarin (3.2%), Nepali (2.3%), Punjabi (0.7%), Vietnamese (0.7%), and Portuguese (0.7%).

Regarding religion, 45.7% of people in Bellerive reported no religious affiliation. Of those who identified with a religion, 41.9% were Christian, with Anglicanism (15.8%) and Catholicism (16.2%) being the most common denominations. Other religions included Hinduism (3.4%), Buddhism (1.8%), and Islam (1.2%).

== Sport ==
Bellerive is best known as the home of international cricket ground Bellerive Oval, currently operating as Ninja Stadium due to a naming rights deal with SharkNinja. The suburb is also a popular area for sailing, with the Bellerive Yacht Club (established in 1926) operating a marina at Bellerive Quay.

== Notable residents ==
- Lees, Derwent (1884–1931), born Kangaroo Point
- McAulay, Alexander Leicester (1863–1931)
- Pembroke Lathrop (1846–1929)
- Nettlefold, Leonard (1905–1971)
- O'May, George Elwin (1876–1956)
- O'May, Henry (Harry) (1872–1962)
- Sharland, Michael Stanley Reid (1899–1987)
