= Mount Rumney, Tasmania =

Mount Rumney
- Suburb
- Interactive map of Mount Rumney
- Coordinates: 42°51′41″S 147°27′11″E
- Country: Australia
- State: Tasmania
- Region: Hobart
- City: Hobart
- LGA: City of Clarence
- Location: 7 km (4.3 mi) E of Rosny Park

Government
  - State electorate: Franklin
  - Federal division: Franklin

Population
  - Total: 267 (2016 census)
- Postcode: 7170
Suburbs around Mount Rumney
Cambridge	Cambridge	Acton Park
Mornington	Mount Rumney	Acton Park
Howrah	Rokeby	Clarendon Vale

Mount Rumney is a semi-rural locality in the local government area (LGA) of Clarence in the Hobart LGA region of Tasmania. The locality is about 7 kilometres (4.3 mi) east of the town of Rosny Park. The 2016 census recorded a population of 267 for the state suburb of Mount Rumney. It is a suburb of Hobart.

The suburb is based on the slopes of the mountain, Mount Rumney, part of the Meehan Range.

== History ==
Mount Rumney was gazetted as a locality in 1999.

== Geography ==
Mount Rumney (the mountain) is contained within the locality.
