= Bellerive Beach, Tasmania =

Suburban beach in Bellerive, Tasmania

Bellerive Beach
- Beach
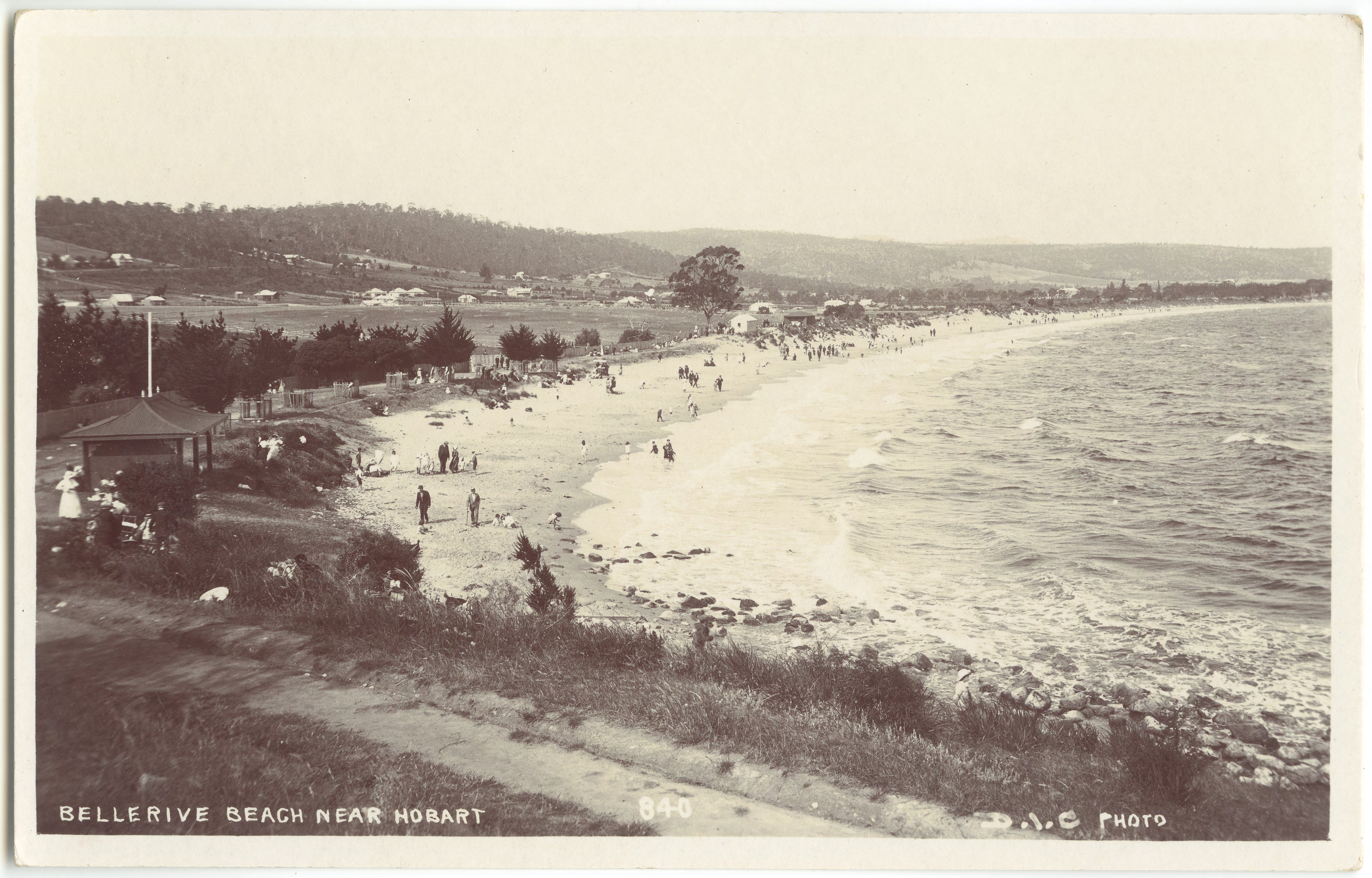
- Bellerive Beach circa 1910

- Location of Bellerive Beach in Hobart
- Coordinates: 42°52′44.45″S 147°22′38.36″E
- Location: Bellerive, Hobart, Tasmania, Australia
- Offshore water bodies: River Derwent

Dimensions
  - Length: 1.2 km (1 mi)
- Patrolled by: Surf Life Saving Tasmania
- Hazard rating: 2/10 (Least hazardous)
- Access: Footpath, Victoria Esplanade, Alexandra Esplanade, Luttrell Avenue

Bellerive Beach is a suburban beach along the River Derwent in Bellerive, Hobart, Tasmania. The south-facing beach is located near the historic Kangaroo Battery coastal defences to the west and Howrah Beach to the east. It offers views across the Derwent estuary to Howrah, Tranmere, and Sandy Bay. Bellerive Beach is accompanied by parkland featuring play equipment, barbecues, and bathroom facilities. The beach is also bordered by the Bellerive Oval, a tree-lined reserve, and private residences.

== History ==
Before the arrival of Europeans, the land had been occupied by the Mouheneener people, part of the Nuennone or "South-East tribe," for possibly as long as 35,000 years. Abalone shell middens were discovered on Bellerive Beach in 1980, providing evidence of early Indigenous activity in the area.

The suburb of Bellerive was originally called Kangaroo Point and was settled in the 1820s. Its name was changed in the 1830s to "Bellerive," meaning "beautiful shore" in French. Historically, the beach has been a hub of local activity, used for exercise, beachcombing, horse racing, regattas, sailing, and swimming.

In 2015, the Clarence City Council developed a "master plan" for Bellerive Beach, which proposed amenities including a cafe, restaurant, and a bathers' pavilion. In 2020, concerns were raised by residents about the slow progress of the project and deviations from the original 2015 vision.

In 2021, several native trees near Bellerive Beach were deliberately poisoned, resulting in the removal of around 30 trees. Investigations were launched into the incident, which angered residents due to the environmental impact.

== Clarence Foreshore Trail ==
A $600,000 shared cycle pathway connecting Bellerive Beach to the River Derwent ferry service at Bellerive was opened in 2021 as part of the Clarence Foreshore Trail. Partial closures of the trail occurred during a stormwater upgrade in 2022, with temporary access routes provided during the construction.

== Marine life ==
Bellerive Beach is home to a variety of marine life. A colony of little penguins (Eudyptula minor) nests behind the dunes, and they can often be seen coming ashore after dark. The Clarence City Council enforces dog restrictions to protect the penguins. In 2021, the reduction of off-leash dog areas around Bellerive Beach and other Tasmanian beaches sparked public concern, with residents advocating for more dedicated spaces.

Occasionally, bioluminescence caused by microscopic plankton can be observed in the waters around Bellerive Beach in the evening. Other marine life observed includes the southern blue-ringed octopus (Hapalochlaena maculosa), Australian swellshark (Cephaloscyllium laticeps), and species of dolphins such as bottlenose dolphins (Tursiops aduncus) and Burrunan dolphins (Tursiops aduncus australis).

== Environment ==
Bellerive Beach and the surrounding reserve are home to various species of wildlife. Native mammals include the southern brown bandicoot (Isoodon obesulus) and the water rat (Hydromys chrysogaster). A variety of birds are also present, such as the musk lorikeet (Glossopsitta concinna), swift parrot (Lathamus discolor), and the Tasmanian masked owl (Tyto novaehollandiae castanops). The area also provides suitable habitat for the eastern barred bandicoot (Perameles gunnii), which is classified as vulnerable.

The area behind the dunes is also home to several frog species, and the broader environment includes potential habitat for various hollow-nesting birds. Environmental changes to the beach landscape occur periodically due to weather patterns and natural forces.

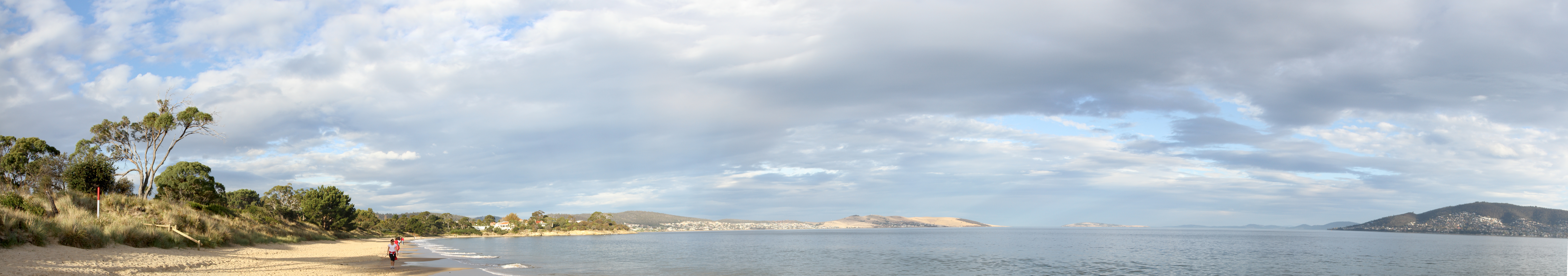
Bellerive Beach and Derwent estuary in 2012

== Access ==
Bellerive Beach is accessible from the Hobart City Centre via the Tasman Bridge. It is a 1.5-hour walk from the CBD or a short ride on the Metro Tasmania bus service. Parking is available off Victoria Esplanade, Alexandra Esplanade, and Luttrell Avenue.
