= Tasmanian State Masters Tournament (Tenpin Bowling) =

Tournament information
- Established: 1971 in Hobart, Tasmania

The Tasmanian State Masters Tournament is an annual Tenpin Bowling tournament competed in by adult-age, open-grade male and female bowlers that are residents of Tasmania and are sanctioned members of the sport's governing body, Tenpin Bowling Australia (TBA Limited) and formerly the Australian Tenpin Bowling Congress (ATBC) until it collapsed in 1998.

== History ==
The tournament has run annually since 1971 and was staged each year at Moonah Bowl (renamed Zone Bowling Moonah on 1 May 2018) in Hobart until the mid-1980s when bowling centres were opened in Devonport, Launceston, Burnie (closed in January 2006) and Mornington (which was based on Hobart's Eastern Shore and closed in August 1992), which saw the tournament being shared between these venues.
Qualification for the men's finals usually involve a three-game series rolled on the Saturday, with the top eight to eleven bowlers (depending on entry numbers) and the reigning champion all progressing to the finals stage on the Sunday.
The finalists usually bowl between eight and eleven games with the highest pinfall along with bonus pins for wins and draws determining the winner, whilst the women's division generally don't have a qualification day due to generally low numbers of participants at that level and play their final alongside the men on the Sunday with the number of games to be determined dependent on entry numbers.
Masters Champions from each year are then given automatic qualification and free entry into the Australian Masters Tournament staged in different venues across Australia annually.

There have been a total of fifty-three Tasmanian State Masters tournaments since its inception in 1971 and the player with the most titles is Devonport's Ashley Riley who has won it on twelve occasions between 1995 and 2018 while Launceston's Hayden George has won the event six times whilst the women's record is held by former Queenslander, Debbie Riley (formerly Bowtell) now of Devonport with six titles between 2002 and 2011, both Carol Steele (formerly Robins) and Jane Gibbons have won five times each.

== Tasmanian State Masters Champions: 1971-2025 ==
| Location | Year | Men's Champion | Women's Champion | Australian Masters Venue |
|---|---|---|---|---|
| Moonah Bowl | 1971 | Peter Dunlop | Shirley Pepper | Moonah Bowl (Hobart, TAS) |
| Moonah Bowl | 1972 | Alex Peshti | Carol Robins | Olympic Bowl (Canberra, ACT) |
| Moonah Bowl | 1973 | Geoff Vince | Carol Robins | Rockdale Bowl (Sydney, NSW) |
| Moonah Bowl | 1974 | Alan Coleman | Sue Phillips | Clayfield Bowl (Brisbane, QLD) |
| Moonah Bowl | 1975 | Alan Coleman | Suzanne Reid | Moorabbin Bowl (Melbourne, VIC) |
| Moonah Bowl | 1976 | Alan Coleman | Joan Wylie | Moonah Bowl (Hobart, TAS) |
| Moonah Bowl | 1977 | Alex Peshti | Vicki Corbett | Woodville Bowl (Adelaide, SA) |
| Moonah Bowl | 1978 | Peter Dunlop | Pam Pope | Fairlanes City Bowl (Perth, WA) |
| Moonah Bowl | 1979 | Robert Boyles | Cindy Day | Bankstown Bowl (Sydney, NSW) |
| Moonah Bowl | 1980 | Geoff Vince | Pam Pope | Olympic Bowl (Canberra, ACT) |
| Moonah Bowl | 1981 | Danny Corbett | Cindy Day | Chevron Bowl (Surfers Paradise, QLD) |
| Moonah Bowl | 1982 | Eric Challenor | Pam Pope | Golden Bowl Camberwell (Melbourne, VIC) |
| Moonah Bowl | 1983 | Wally Menzies | Carol Steele | Moonah Bowl (Hobart, TAS) |
| Moonah Bowl | 1984 | Hank Jansen | Pam Pope | Rockhampton Bowl (Rockhampton, QLD) |
| N/A | 1985 | Rodney Radcliffe | Carol Steele | Woodville Bowl (Adelaide, SA) |
| N/A | 1986 | Brian Callander | Pam Pope | Olympic Bowl (Canberra, ACT) |
| N/A | 1987 | Ted Tylutki | Debbie Turvey | Cannington Bowl (Perth, WA) |
| N/A | 1988 | Tony Bracken | Helen Woodbridge | Moorabbin Bowl (Melbourne, VIC) |
| N/A | 1989 | Martin McKercher | Susan Baldock | Mount Druitt Lanes (Sydney, NSW) |
| Devonport Bowl | 1990 | Graham Hinkley | Michelle Blair | Kirwan Lanes (Townsville, QLD) |
| N/A | 1991 | Norm Green | Louise Eady | Moonah Bowl (Hobart, TAS) |
| N/A | 1992 | Brett Riley | Carol Steele | Gosford City Bowl (Gosford, NSW) |
| Launceston Lanes | 1993 | Nigel Harrison | Dianne Cooke | Woodville Bowl (Adelaide, SA) |
| Moonah Bowl | 1994 | Matt Cramond | Lesley Hyland | Clayfield Bowl (Clayfield, QLD) |
| Launceston Lanes | 1995 | Ashley Riley | Brenda Cox | Geelong Bowling Lanes (Geelong, VIC) |
| Devonport Bowl | 1996 | Ashley Riley | Brenda Cox | Cannington Bowl (Perth, WA) |
| N/A | 1997 | Garry Crick | Lynne Zambotti | Cannington Bowl (Perth, WA) |
| N/A | 1998 | Ashley Riley | Brenda Cox | Burleigh Bowl (Burleigh Heads, QLD) |
| N/A | 1999 | Ashley Riley | Kassey Fechner | Cross Road Bowl (Adelaide, SA) |
| N/A | 2000 | Paul Lucock | Rebecca Salter | AMF Knox (Melbourne, VIC) |
| AMF Moonah | 2001 | Paul Lucock | Jessika Everingham | Canberra International Bowl (Canberra, ACT) |
| Burnie Bowl | 2002 | Brett Kenley | Debbie Bowtell | AMF Bankstown (Sydney, NSW) |
| AMF Moonah | 2003 | Hayden George | Debbie Bowtell | Kirwan Lanes (Townsville, QLD) |
| AMF Launceston | 2004 | Hayden George | Kassey Fechner | AMF Forest Hill (Melbourne, VIC) |
| Devonport Bowl | 2005 | Ashley Riley | Debbie Riley | Illawarra Strikezone (Albion Park, NSW) |
| N/A | 2006 | Ashley Riley | Anne-Louise Potter | AMF Moonah (Hobart, TAS) |
| N/A | 2007 | Ashley Riley | Jackie Riley | OzTenpin Altona (Melbourne, VIC) |
| N/A | 2008 | Hayden George | Jackie Riley | AMF Tuggeranong (Canberra, ACT) |
| AMF Moonah | 2009 | Ashley Riley | Debbie Riley | AMF Mount Gravatt (Brisbane, QLD) |
| AMF Launceston | 2010 | Matt Cramond | Debbie Riley | AMF Rooty Hill (Sydney, NSW) |
| Devonport Bowl | 2011 | Ashley Riley | Debbie Riley | AMF Rooty Hill (Sydney, NSW) |
| AMF Moonah | 2012 | Andrew Phillips | Kassey Fechner | AMF Rooty Hill (Sydney, NSW) |
| AMF Launceston | 2013 | Ashley Riley | Jane Gibbons | Kirwan Lanes (Townsville, QLD) |
| Devonport Bowl | 2014 | Hayden George | Jane Gibbons | Tenpin City Lidcombe (Sydney, NSW) |
| AMF Moonah | 2015 | Ashley Riley | Kaitlyn Commane (VIC) | Tenpin City Lidcombe (Sydney, NSW) |
| AMF Launceston | 2016 | Lachlan Merchant (VIC) | Kaitlyn Commane (VIC) | Tenpin City Lidcombe (Sydney, NSW) |
| Devonport Bowl | 2017 | Brad Goss | Rebekah Commane (VIC) | Wyncity Point Cook (Melbourne, VIC) |
| Zone Bowling Moonah | 2018 | Ashley Riley | Karen Commane | OzTenpin Chirnside Park (Melbourne, VIC) |
| Launceston Lanes | 2019 | Hayden George | Jane Gibbons | Zone Bowling Rooty Hill (Sydney, NSW) |
| Devonport Bowl | 2020 | Ben Allison | Jane Gibbons | Tournament Cancelled (Covid) |
| Zone Bowling Moonah | 2021 | Hayden George | Sarah Pennicott | Zone Bowling Moonah (Hobart, TAS) |
| Devonport Bowl | 2022 | Josh Murfet | Allison Oakley | Zone Bowling Moonah (Hobart, TAS) |
| Devonport Bowl | 2023 | Ben Allison | Jane Gibbons | Zone Bowling Moonah (Hobart, TAS) |
| Launceston Lanes | 2024 | Ben Allison | Jackie Riley | AGL National High Performance Centre (Alexandra Headland, QLD) |
| The Alley Entertainment Centre (Devonport) | 2025 | Ashley Riley | Jackie Riley | – |
