= Acton Park, Tasmania =

Acton Park
- Suburb
- Interactive map of Acton Park
- Coordinates: 42°51′57″S 147°28′11″E
- Country: Australia
- State: Tasmania
- Region: Hobart
- City: Hobart
- LGA: Clarence
- Location: 15 km (9.3 mi) E of Rosny Park

Government
  - State electorate: Franklin
  - Federal division: Franklin

Population
  - Total: 2,293 (2021 census)
- Postcode: 7170
Suburbs around Acton Park
Cambridge	(Cambridge Aerodrome)	(Hobart Airport)
Mount Rumney	Acton Park	Seven Mile Beach
Clarendon Vale	Oakdowns	Roches Beach

Acton Park is a residential / rural locality in the local government area (LGA) of Clarence in the Hobart LGA region of Tasmania. The locality is about 15 kilometres (9.3 mi) east of the town of Rosny Park. The 2021 census recorded a population of 2293 for Acton Park, 49 of which were Indigenous. 51.8% were male and 48.2% were female.

Acton Park is bounded to the east by the southern portion of the Meehan Range, to the south by Ralphs Bay, and to the east by Roches Beach, Single Hill and Seven Mile Beach. It is one of the more sought after living locations due to its easy commuting distance to Hobart, and because of the semi-rural character of the suburb itself.

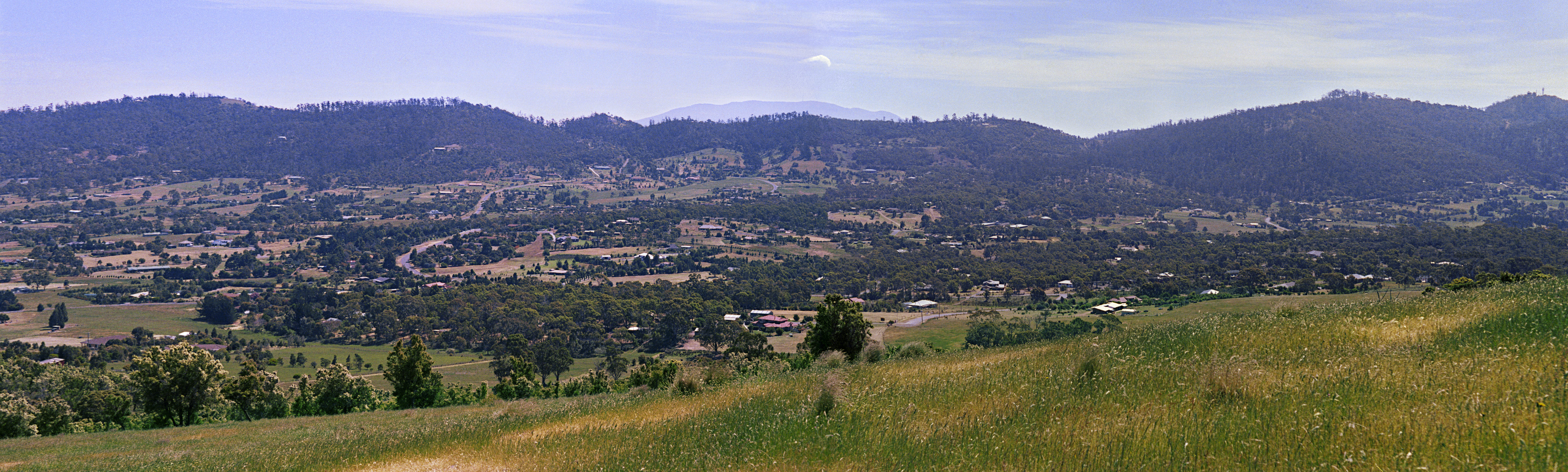
Acton Park and environs from near the summit of Single Hill

== History ==
Acton Park is a confirmed locality.

== Geography ==
The waters of Frederick Henry Bay form a small part of the eastern boundary.

== Road infrastructure ==
Route C330 (Acton Road) runs through from north-west to south-east.
