= Wentworth Park, Tasmania =

Football ground in Howrah, Tasmania

Wentworth Park
- Interactive map of Wentworth Park
- Location: Howrah Beach, Howrah, Tasmania
- Coordinates: 42.8789°S 147.3941°E
- Owner: Clarence City Council
- Operator: Clarence City Council

Tenants
- Clarence United (TSC/NPL Tasmania) (1978-2019); Clarence Zebras (NPL Tasmania) (2020-present); Southern Touch; Eastern Shore Thunder (Tasmania Rugby League) (2009-2012); Clarence Eels (Tasmania Rugby League) (2013-2015)

Wentworth Park is the home ground of Clarence Zebras FC, but can be used by other teams in other sports such as touch football, and Ultimate Frisbee tournaments. In the summer it is used as a cricket ground. It is a picturesque facility located adjacent to Howrah Beach and allows for views across the River Derwent.

The facility is served by three main pitches, as well as a training ground and a touch pitch. In the early 1990s Clarence United FC (then called Phoenix) upgraded the clubrooms, bar, and changing room facilities.

The headquarters for Tasmanian Touch Association and the offices and grounds of Southern Touch, where they hold summer and winter rosters on up to 10 touch fields.

The ground is not owned by the Clarence United FC, but is a Clarence City Council facility who lease the ground to the club on a long-term basis on the proviso that other sports be permitted to share the facilities with Clarence United FC. The site was originally coastal lagoons, and the city council had historically used the site as landfill rubbish tip. In 2003, the ground was featured in the media on ABC Stateline, when local residents suggested that DDTs, and other Organochlorides had been used to control vermin and mosquitoes when the site was a rubbish dump, and that these chemicals were responsible for higher than usual rates of diseases such as cancer in the area. An investigation was carried out, collecting soil, groundwater and soil gas data. An environmental assessment report was published in response, suggesting that the human health risk posed by latent chemicals was negligible.
