= South Arm Highway =

Highway in Tasmania, Australia

South Arm Highway Tasmania
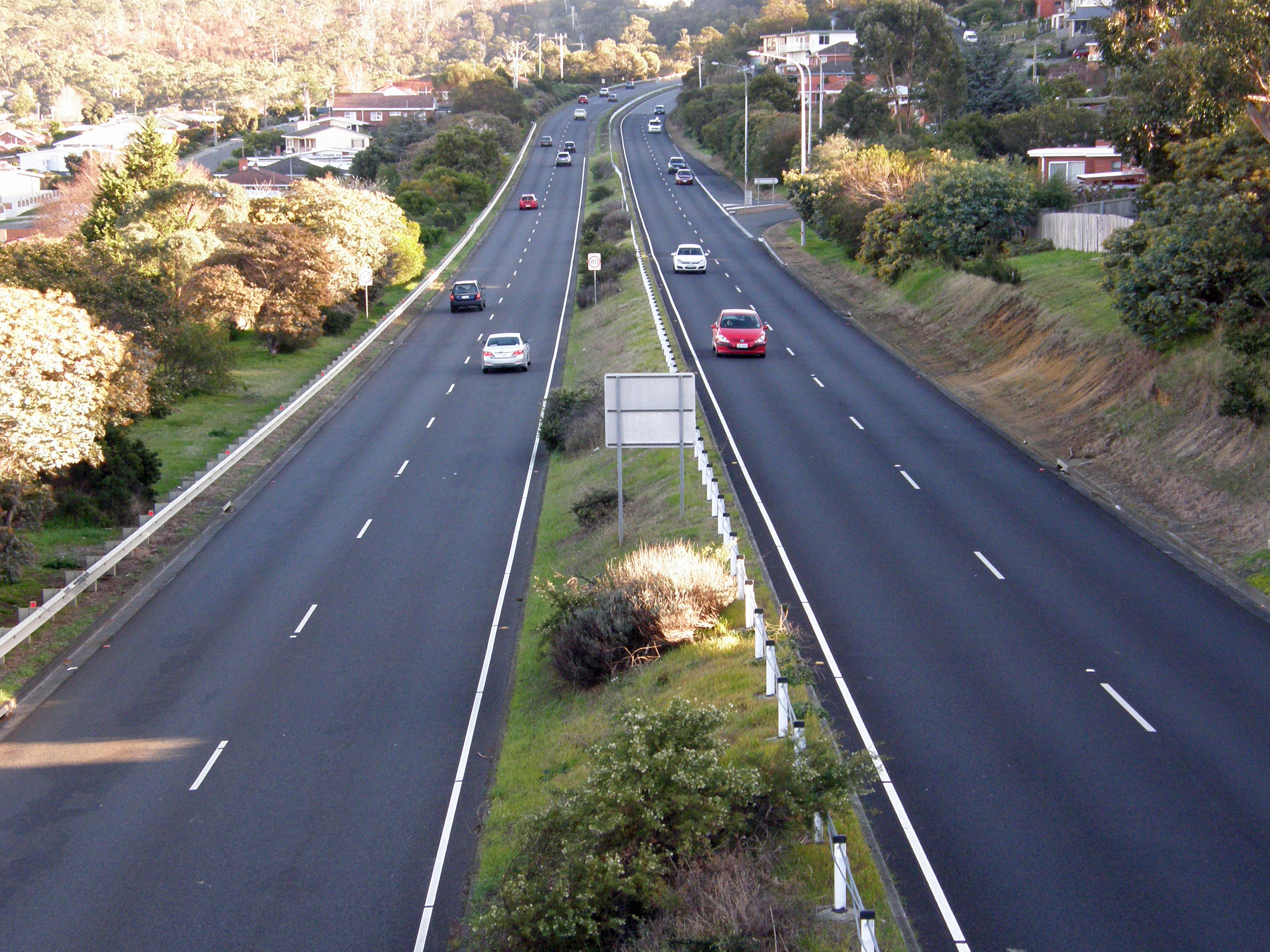
- South Arm Highway at Howrah
- Coordinates: 42°52′0″S 147°23′55″E

General information
- Type: Highway
- Length: 4.2 km (2.6 mi)
- Opened: 1989
- Route number(s): B33

Major junctions
- North end: Tasman Highway (A3), Mornington
- Cambridge Road (C329); Mornington Road; Shoreline Drive
- South end: Rokeby Road (B33), Howrah

Location(s)
- Region: Hobart

Highway system
- Highways in Australia; National Highway • Freeways in Australia; Highways in Tasmania

The South Arm Highway (part of the B33 road route) is a highway serving the southern suburbs of Hobart, on the eastern shore of the River Derwent in Tasmania, Australia. The highway is a major trunk road that carries heavy commuter traffic south from the Eastern Outlet to Howrah and Rokeby. As one of the Tasman Highway's principle Feeders and one of the eastern shore's major transport corridors, The South Arm Highway facilitates the movement of traffic between the suburbs and satellite communities to the south with the city centre and ultimately, other major cross city highways. With annual average daily traffic (AADT) of 17,000, the highway is considered a major traffic corridor within Hobart. The designation "South Arm Highway" arises from its journey south (via Rokeby Road) to South Arm.

== Route description ==
South Arm Highway's northern end is at a grade-separated interchange with the Tasman Highway, at the boundary of Warrane and Mornington. The road continues north from the interchange as Flagstaff Gully Link to Flagstaff Gully, while immediately to the south is a roundabout with Cambridge Road, which carries the C329 road route towards Mornington. Only 150 metres (490 ft) south of the roundabout is a T junction with Mornington Road, for access to the Mornington Business Estate. The highway continues south past the industrial area, and then curves to the south-east around the Waverley Flora Park. After entering the residential suburb of Howrah, South Arm Highway continues south-east to intersect Shoreline Drive at a large roundabout. Beyond this intersection, the highway passes through a reverse curve to reach its southern terminus at Oceana Drive. Rockeby Road continues on from the highway, as single-carriageway road, towards South Arm.

The highway is assigned the road route B33, and in 2007, the annual average daily traffic volume was 17,000.

== History ==
In 1965, a major Transportation Study was commissioned for the Hobart metropolitan area proposing the construction of several freeways to service the city, including a major south bound freeway servicing the eastern shore of the Derwent River. The Southeastern Freeway was intended to run south from the Tasman Highway, to the head of Kangaroo Bay, across the second beach and along through wirksworth, and to Rokeby. Some land was acquired but construction of the road never began. The Freeway was deemed to be unrealistic in that it was too expensive and would have come in close proximity to Schools and other vital services.

=== Bellerive Bypass ===
The concept of providing a major arterial road to Howrah was revisited with the release of the "Hobart Transport Revision" several years later. This new proposal entailed construction of a major road in an undeveloped corridor, bypassing Bellerive. Featuring a dual carriageway alignment, The first stage was opened in 1989. The Highway intersects the Tasman Highway at Mornington and then proceeds south through the Meehan Range before passing a large roundabout at Howrah. While the earthworks were completed in the first stage, the final one km (0.62 mi) proceeded as single carriageway to the old South Arm Highway alignment. Completion of the bypass replaced Clarence Street as the major trunk road connecting South Arm and Hobart which passed through Bellerive and Rosny. The final section of the bypass was completed in 2009, with the duplication of the South Arm Highway to Oceana Drive. Originally planned to be fully grade-separated, the highway is currently limited-access with at-grade intersections.

== Exits ==
The entire highway is in the City of Clarence local government area.

Location	km	mi	Destinations	Notes
Warrane–Mornington boundary	0	0.0	Tasman Highway eastbound ramps (A3) / Flagstaff Gully Link north – Sorell, Flagstaff Gully	Northern highway terminus; interchange with eastbound exit via loop ramp
Warrane–Mornington boundary	0.24	0.15	Tasman Highway westbound ramps (A3) – Hobart	Northern highway terminus; interchange with eastbound exit via loop ramp
Warrane–Mornington boundary	0.30	0.19	Cambridge Road (C329 east) – Mornington, Warrane, Rosny Park, Bellerive	Roundabout
Mornington	0.45	0.28	Mornington Road – Mornington Business Estate	T junction
Howrah	3.1	1.9	Shoreline Drive east & southwest / Lorne Crescent north	Roundabout; no entry from Lorne Crescent
Howrah	4.2	2.6	Rokeby Road (B33) east / Merindah Street north / Oceana Drive south – Rokeby, Lauderdale, Opossum Bay	Southern highway terminus; traffic light intersection
1.000 mi = 1.609 km; 1.000 km = 0.621 mi: Incomplete access

== See also ==
- List of highways in Hobart
