= Sports Association of Tasmanian Independent Schools =

Sports Association of Tasmanian Independent Schools (SATIS)
- Headquarters: Tasmania, Australia
- Members: 16 member schools
- Official language: English
- Website: Sports Association of Tasmanian Independent Schools

The Sports Association of Tasmanian Independent Schools (SATIS) is a group of sixteen schools in Tasmania, Australia formed by AHISA Tasmania to conduct sporting competitions for member schools. NSATIS and SSATIS are regional bodies which organise and conduct competitions in their respective regions.

== Schools ==
=== Current member schools ===
School	Location	Enrolment	Founded	Denomination	Boys/Girls	Day/Boarding	School Colours
Calvin Christian School	Kingston	~660	1962	Non-denominational	Boys & Girls	Day	Black, old gold and white
Dominic College	Glenorchy	~950	1973	Catholic	Boys & Girls	Day	Maroon and gold
The Fahan School	Sandy Bay	~383	1935	Non-denominational	Girls	Day & Boarding	Orange, white and navy
The Friends' School	North Hobart	~1330	1887	Quaker	Boys & Girls	Day & Boarding	Navy, red and grey
Guilford Young College	Hobart	900+	1995	Catholic	Boys & Girls	Day	Navy, sky blue, gold and red
The Hutchins School	Sandy Bay	1000	1846	Anglican	Boys	Day & Boarding	Black, magenta and gold
Launceston Church Grammar School	Launceston	838	1846	Anglican	Boys & Girls	Day & Boarding	Royal blue, black and white
MacKillop College	Mornington	560	1994	Catholic	Boys & Girls	Day	Navy, red and white
Marist Regional College	Burnie	~770	1972	Catholic	Boys & Girls	Day	Light blue and navy
Mount Carmel College, Sandy Bay	Sandy Bay	540	1942	Catholic	Girls	Day	Navy, gold and white
Sacred Heart College	New Town	940	1888	Catholic	Boys & Girls	Day	Red, blue and white
St Aloysius Catholic College	Huntingfield	1100	1960	Catholic	Boys & Girls	Day	Navy, lime and white
St Brendan-Shaw College	Devonport	680+	1981	Catholic	Boys & Girls	Day	Navy, green and royal blue
St Mary's College	Hobart	~940	1868	Catholic	Girls	Day	Dark green, light blue and copper
St Michael's Collegiate School	Hobart	900	1892	Anglican	Girls	Day & Boarding	Maroon, navy and white
St Patrick's College	Launceston	~1466	1873	Catholic	Boys & Girls	Day	Dark green and gold
St Virgil's College	Hobart	~750	1911	Catholic	Boys	Day	Royal blue, dark green and gold
Scotch Oakburn College	Launceston	1100	1979	Uniting	Boys & Girls	Day & Boarding	Gold, maroon and navy
Southern Christian College	Kingston		1986	Non-denominational	Boys & Girls	Day	Navy and gold

== Sports ==
- Athletics
- Cricket
- Football
- Hockey
- Netball
- Rowing
- Soccer
- Softball
- Swimming
- Tennis

== See also ==
- List of schools in Tasmania
