= Ralphs Bay =

Bay in Tasmania, Australia

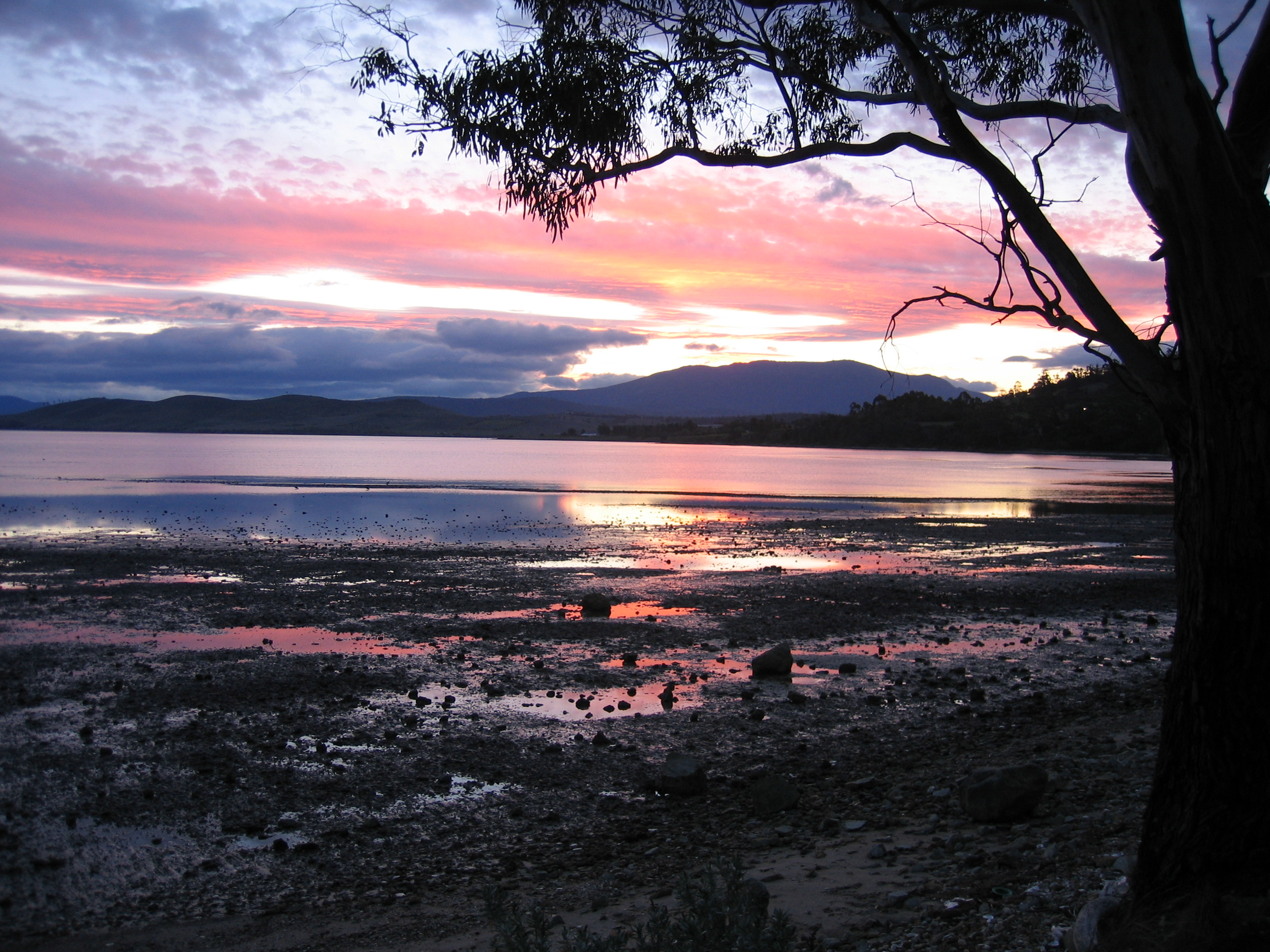
- Ralphs Bay at sunset, 2006

- Location in Tasmania
- Coordinates: 42°58′12″S 147°25′48″E
- Type: Bay
- Basin countries: Australia
- Settlements: Rokeby, Lauderdale, Sandford, South Arm, Opossum Bay

Ralphs Bay is a body of water in south-east Tasmania, Australia. It is semi-enclosed by the Tranmere / Rokeby peninsula and the South Arm peninsula. Sea access to the bay is from the River Derwent.

Ralphs Bay is a shallow, windy bay, situated on the south-east of the Derwent Estuary, about 12 kilometres from the south-east of Hobart in Tasmania, Australia. The bay is sheltered by the low, grassy hills of Droughty Point to the north-west and the spit of South Arm and Opossum Bay to the south-west.

== Ecology ==
The red-necked stint migrates from Siberia every year and most of the birds, which do that, find themselves in Ralphs Bay. It is also an important area for the spotted handfish. They are critically endangered and, because of the pollution in the River Derwent, live in majority at Ralphs Bay and its surrounding waters.

The bay is part of the South Arm Important Bird Area (IBA), identified as such by BirdLife International because of its importance for the conservation of pied oystercatchers and of the migratory waders, or shorebirds, of the East Asian – Australasian Flyway.

== Colonial history ==
Australia's first shore-based whaling station was established in Ralph's Bay at Trywork(s) Point. It was in operation by 27 September 1805 when the Rev Knopwood recorded in his diary,

At 9 I went across the river to see the tryworks. They had a great quantity of oil casks. Mr Collins brought a 100 ton of oil from Capt Moody of the King George, whaler, which she had caught since she had been in the river.

The whaling station, which only operated in the winter months, had closed down by 1818.

== Recent history ==
Since 2004 Ralphs Bay has been the focus of a local development debate. Walker Corporation had planned a major development in the bay near Lauderdale. The proposal included a canal development and a marina, to be known as "Lauderdale Quay". It met strong opposition from the local community which was concerned that the development would destroy native wildlife habitat in the area and reduce public access to the foreshore.

On 22 October 2009 the Tasmanian Planning Commission released its Draft Integrated Assessment Report which highlighted significant planning issues that seem to indicate that approval will not be given for the proposal. On 23 June 2010 the Greens announced the legal confirmation of the Ralphs Bay Conservation Area as being 171 hectares and therefore preventing proposed canal housing estates.
