= Howrah Beach =

Suburban beach in Howrah, Tasmania

- Beach
- Location within Hobart
- Coordinates: 42°52′54.61″S 147°23′51.96″E
- Location: Howrah, Hobart, Tasmania, Australia
- Water bodies: River Derwent

Dimensions
  - Length: 1.2 km (1 mi)
- Patrolled by: Surf Life Saving Tasmania
- Hazard rating: 2/10 (Least hazardous)
- Access: Clarence Foreshore Trail, Silwood Avenue, Salacia Avenue, Howrah Road

Howrah Beach is a 1.2 km (1 mi) stretch of recreational beach situated along the River Derwent in Howrah, a suburb of Hobart, Tasmania, Australia. The south-facing beach neighbours Bellerive Beach to the west and is bookended by Howrah Point to the east. The beach has views of the Derwent estuary, the neighbouring suburb of Tranmere, Sandy Bay on the western shore, and southern views of South Arm, Tinderbox and the northern tip of Bruny Island. Howrah Beach is backed by a narrow tree-lined reserve and private properties, the Clarence Foreshore Trail, Clarence High School adjoining Wentworth Park, Howrah Community Centre, Howrah Men's Shed and the Sunshine Tennis Club.

== Environment ==
Howrah Beach consists of two distinct zones, Howrah Beach and Little Howrah Beach, which consists of the south-eastern section. In 1912, a humpback whale calf measuring 4.3 metres (14 ft) beached itself along the Howrah shoreline and was subsequently dissected by local fishermen. Two self-cleaning stormwater traps were installed at the beach in 1997.

=== Little Howrah Beach ===
Little Howrah Beach, is a 200-metre (660 ft) low-energy, low-gradient beach located at the eastern end of the main beach, facing west towards Hobart, which is situated 8.0 kilometres (5 mi) across the Derwent. In 1956, the then-privately owned section of beach came under council scrutiny for the excess removal of beach sand. The southernmost point of the beach is shielded from strong winds by Howrah Point, creating a tranquil and sheltered environment. Following the rear of the beach, Tranmere Road is bordered on either side by a small seawall and a grassy reserve. A boat dock, some low rocks, and private properties are located in the northernmost part of the road.

== Access ==
Howrah Beach is accessible from the Hobart City Centre via the Tasman Bridge. It is a two hour walk from the CBD, or a single 20 minute metro bus ride. There is dedicated parking at the beach directly off Howrah Road. The beach can be accessed on foot via the Clarence Foreshore Trail.
