= William Collins (colonist) =

English naval officer and settler

William Collins (1760–1819) was an English naval officer and an early settler in Tasmania, Australia. In April 1804 he was appointed Hobart's first harbour master. He established Australia's first whaling station at Ralphs Bay, Tasmania, in 1805.
