= Scouting and Guiding in Tasmania =

Tasmania
- Owner: Scouts Australia
- Headquarters: Lea Scout Centre
- Location: Kingston, Tasmania
- Country: Australia
- Founded: 1921
- Founder: The Boy Scouts Association of the United Kingdom
- Chief Scout: Barbara Baker
- Chief Commissioner: Phil Harper
- Website www.tas.scouts.com.au

Scouting in Tasmania began in 1908 with several separate associations operating in the early years including the Chums Scout Patrols, League of Boy Scouts, Girl Peace Scouts, British Boy Scouts and YMCA Scouts. These were later joined by The Boy Scouts Association, The Girl Guides Association and Life-Saving Scouts and Life Saving Guards of the Salvation Army. Some local groups of Scouts moved between associations. There has also been representation by the Baden-Powell Scouts' Association with a group of scouts in Devonport under Alan Richmond, OAM affiliating in May 1984.

Scouting and Guiding in Tasmania is now predominantly represented by Scouts Australia's Tasmanian Branch and Girl Guides Australia's Tasmanian Branch.

== The Scout Association Of Australia Tasmanian Branch ==
The Scout Association Of Australia Tasmanian Branch is organised around several Scout Districts:

- Clarence
- Hellyer
- Huon
- Kingborough
- Launceston and Tamar
- Leven
- Mersey
- North Midlands
- Wellington

and a District for Distant Groups.

=== History ===
Captain D. Colbron Pearse was Assistant Commandant at the Humshaugh Camp run by the publishers of The Scout magazine, C. Arthur Pearson Limited, in England in 1908. Pearse was working for Pearsons as an illustrator.

=== Campsites and Facilities ===
The main adult training centre is the Lea Scout Centre, 8 km from Hobart. It also houses the Branch Headquarters and the Tasmanian Scout Heritage Centre opened in 1997. There are several other Activity Centres throughout the State.

North

- Carnacoo Camp, Paper Beach
- Scout Island
- Carr Villa Lodge, Ben Lomond

North West

- BP Lodge, Cradle Mountain
- Fulton Park, Forth
- Paton Park, North Morton
- Blythe Park, Heybridge
- Cantara Campsite, Smithton
- Fraser Creek Hut

South

- Hobart Bush Cabins
- The Lea Scout Centre, Kingston

== Girl Guides Tasmania ==
Girl Guides Tasmania is divided into 4 Regions

- North West
- North "McIntyre"
- South East
- South West

Guides Tasmania has two camp sites, Nindethana by the Tamar River near Launceston and Orana 20 km from Hobart in the suburb of Lauderdale.

== Gang Shows ==
- Hobart Gang Show started in 1956; in recess between 1971 and 1990, located in Hobart.
