= Seven Mile Beach, Tasmania =

Seven Mile Beach
- Town
- Coordinates: 42°51′23″S 147°30′30″E
- Country: Australia
- State: Tasmania
- Region: Hobart
- LGA: Clarence
- Location: 17 km (11 mi) E of Rosny Park; 9 km (5.6 mi) N of Lauderdale

Government
  - State electorate: Franklin
  - Federal division: Franklin

Population
  - Total: 1,286 (2016 census)
- Postcode: 7170
Localities around Seven Mile Beach
Cambridge, Acton Park	Pitt Water, Cambridge	Pitt Water
Acton Park	Seven Mile Beach	Pitt Water
Acton Park	Frederick Henry Bay, Acton Park	Frederick Henry Bay

Seven Mile Beach is a rural residential locality in the local government area (LGA) of Clarence in the Hobart LGA region of Tasmania. The locality is about 17 kilometres (11 mi) east of the town of Rosny Park. The 2016 census recorded a population of 1286 for the state suburb of Seven Mile Beach.

== History ==
Seven Mile Beach was gazetted as a locality in 1966.

== Geography ==
The waters of Frederick Henry Bay form most of the southern boundary, and Pitt Water the eastern and part of the northern.

== Road infrastructure ==
Acton Road (Route C330) passes to the south-west, continuing onto Lauderdale. Estate Drive and Seven Mile Beach Road provide access to the locality from Acton Road.

Grueber Avenue opened in 2017 connecting Surf Road to the Hobart International Airport and the Tasman Highway (Highway A3) via Holyman Avenue.
