= Dominic College =

Location
- Glenorchy, Tasmania; Australia; 42°50′4″S 147°16′12″E

Information
- Type: Private, co-educational, day school
- Motto: Live by the Truth
- Denomination: Roman Catholic
- Established: 1973
- Rector: Bernie Graham SDB
- Principal: Stephen Casni
- Enrolment: ~950 (K–10)
- Colours: Maroon & gold
- Slogan: Be respectful, honest, responsible and learners.
- Affiliation: Sports Association of Tasmanian Independent Schools
- Website: www.dominic.tas.edu.au

Dominic College is a Roman Catholic, co-educational, day school, located in Glenorchy, a suburb of Hobart, Tasmania, Australia.

Dominic College caters for students from Kindergarten to Grade 10.

== History ==
The college owes its religious foundation to the Salesians of Don Bosco and the Dominican Sisters. Dominic College was formed in 1973 and was the first Co-educational Catholic College in Tasmania. The Senior Campus amalgamated with other Catholic Secondary Colleges in 1995 to form Guilford Young College. In 2009, Dominic opened an on-campus early learning and child care centre.

== Student leadership ==
The four houses of the college, Bosco, Siena, Savio and Guzman, have four leaders each which all have set responsibilities.
Mission Captains: Enforces the religious and community aspect of school life by helping in masses, liturgies and charity.
Sport Captains: Enforces the sporting aspect of school life by assisting in organising sporting carnivals, lunchtime sport and co-curricular sport.
Creative Arts Captains: Enforces the creative arts aspect of school life by assisting and promoting house events such as house drama, co-curricular creative arts and various public exhibitions.
Academic Captains: Promote the importance of learning throughout the college by ensuring all students are learning to the best of their abilities. These leaders are also assisted by their house co-ordinator. The secondary college and primary school also has one male and female captain and one male and female vice-captain. These captaincy positions are held by students in either year 6 or year 10. The captains must uphold the school values and represent the school wherever they are. Each leader of any sort receives a black tie and badge for recognition towards their position in the school.

== Sport ==
Dominic College is a member of the Sports Association of Tasmanian Independent Schools (SATIS).

=== SATIS premierships ===
Dominic College has won the following SATIS premierships.

Boys:

- Football – 1977
- Hockey – 1982
- Rowing Eight – 1988
- Tennis (2) – 1980, 1982

Girls:

- Netball (4) – 1985, 1988, 1990, 1994
- Softball (2) – 1980, 1984
- Tennis – 1982

== Notable alumni ==
- Luke McGregor – comedian and actor
- David Walsh – professional gambler, businessman, art collector, owner of the Museum of Old and New Art (MONA)
- James Manson – AFL Footballer
- Ian Stewart – footballer, Richmond Football Club, St Kilda Football Club
- Paul Williams – AFL footballer
- Andy Lovell – AFL Footballer, Melbourne Football Club
- Liam Jones – AFL Footballer, Western Bulldogs Football Club, Carlton Football Club

== See also ==
- List of schools in Tasmania
- Education in Tasmania
- Roman Catholic Archdiocese of Hobart
- Catholic education in Australia
