= Dora Isabel Baudinet =

Australian nurse (1883–1945)

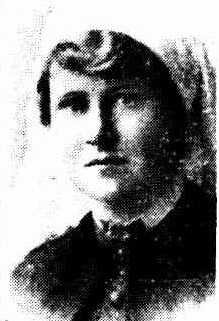
- Born: 19 April 1883; Coongulmerang
- Died: 19 December 1945 (aged 62); Royal Hobart Hospital

Dora Isabel Baudinet (19 April 1883 – 19 December 1945) was an Australian nurse and philanthropist. She founded the Sunshine Association of Tasmania.

== Life ==
Baudinet was born in 1883 in Coongulmerang near Bairnsdale in Victoria. Her Tasmanian-born parents were Helen Jane (born McKay) and her husband Edmund Chaulk Baudinet. She was raised in Hobart by her mother as her father, who had been a grazier, died days before she was born. She was the last of three children and her father's brothers helped the family. She completed her schooling at the Friends' High School in 1898.

In 1915 she joined the Australian Army Nursing Service and she was assigned to the 1st Australian General Hospital. She embarked on HMAT Wandilla. The hospital operated in Cairo until March 1916 when it moved to France operating in Rouen. She returned to Melbourne in 1917.

In 1937 she and Margaret Reid, who was a headmistress, were in New Zealand where they saw provision for children that was unavailable in Tasmania. They decided to open a similar home to the one they had seen and Baudinet took the lead. In 1938 she founded the Sunshine Association of Tasmania. The association's purpose was to care for under-privileged children.

== Death and legacy ==
Baudinet died in the Royal Hobart Hospital in 1945 from cancer leaving £7,400. She had been a member of the Returned Army Sisters' Association and that year she was its president. She left 10 acres of land and her assets to the Sunshine Association. Assisted by her legacy the Tasmanian Sunshine Centre opened on the land she had given at the beachside Hobart suburb of Howrah in 1951.
