= Hugh Greenwood =

Australian former sportsman (born 1992)

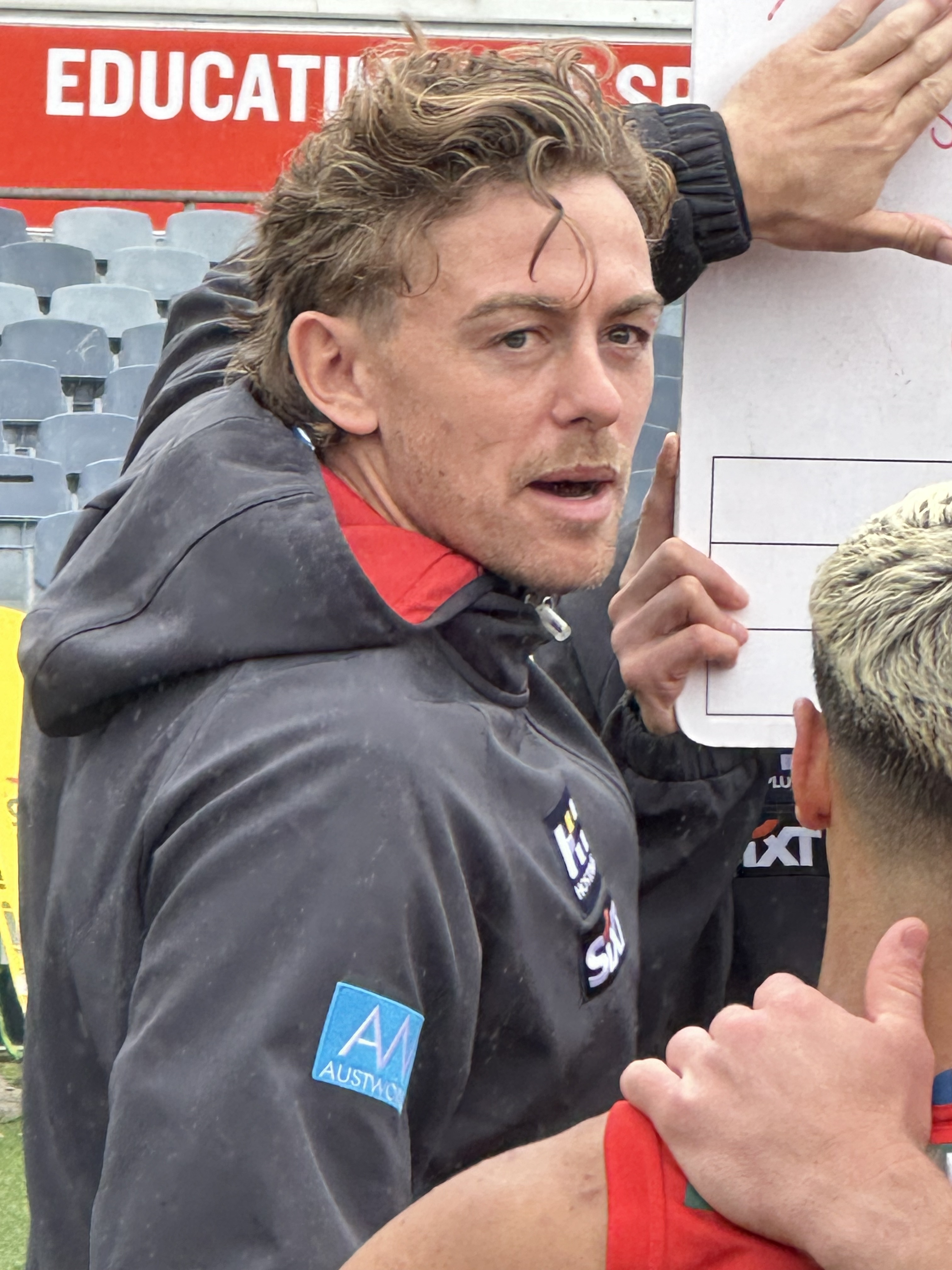
- Greenwood with Gold Coast in 2026

Personal information
- Nickname: Mick Fanning
- Born: 6 March 1992 (age 34); Hobart, Tasmania, Australia
- Original team: Lauderdale
- Draft: No. 48, 2015 rookie draft
- Height: 191 cm (6 ft 3 in)
- Weight: 92 kg (203 lb)
- Position: Midfielder

Playing career
Years	Club	Games (Goals)
2016–2019	Adelaide	51 (36)
2020–2021	Gold Coast	32 (9)
2022–2024	North Melbourne	38 (7)
Total		121 (52)

Hugh Greenwood (born 6 March 1992) is an Australian former sportsman who played Australian rules football and basketball.

Greenwood was a promising under-16 footballer, but opted to attempt a career in basketball in 2008, moving to the United States in 2011 to play college basketball for the University of New Mexico. He returned to Australia in 2015 and joined the Perth Wildcats of the National Basketball League, but abruptly switched codes to sign with the Adelaide Football Club of the Australian Football League (AFL) as a category B rookie in September 2015

He moved to the Gold Coast Suns in 2019 and then North Melbourne Football Club in 2022. He retired from the AFL in August 2024 after 121 senior games across the Crows, Suns and Kangaroos.

== Early life ==
Greenwood was born in Hobart, Tasmania, where he attended Lauderdale Primary School and MacKillop College, and played junior football for Lauderdale Football Club. He was a talented junior footballer, representing Tasmania at the national under-16 championships in 2007. He later accepted a basketball scholarship at the Australian Institute of Sport (AIS) in Canberra, where he attended Canberra High School.

== Basketball career ==
Hugh Greenwood
Personal information
- Listed height: 6 ft 3 in (1.91 m)
- Listed weight: 205 lb (93 kg)

Career information
- High school: MacKillop College (Hobart, Tasmania); Canberra (Canberra, ACT)
- College: New Mexico (2011–2015)
- NBA draft: 2015: undrafted
- Playing career: 2008–2011
- Position: Point guard

Career history
- 2008–2010: Australian Institute of Sport
- 2011: Hobart Chargers

Career highlights
- Third-team All-Mountain West (2015)

=== SEABL ===
Greenwood played for the AIS men's team in the South East Australian Basketball League (SEABL) between 2008 and 2010. For the 2011 SEABL season, Greenwood played for the Hobart Chargers.

=== College ===
==== Freshman year ====
In April 2011, Greenwood signed a National Letter of Intent to play college basketball for the University of New Mexico.

As a freshman in 2011–12, Greenwood earned Academic All-Mountain West Conference selection. The Lobos won the Mountain West Tournament title and reached the third round of the 2012 NCAA Tournament. Greenwood scored a season-high 22 points in 19 minutes against Air Force on 8 March 2012, which marked his first 20+ point performance of his career. In 33 games, he averaged 6.3 points, 3.7 rebounds and 2.5 assists in 23.2 minutes per game.

==== Sophomore year ====
As a sophomore in 2012–13, Greenwood earned Honorable Mention All-Mountain West and repeated as an Academic All-Mountain West selection. He was also named to Bob Cousy Collegiate Point Guard of the Year Award Watch List. He started every game for the Lobos as a sophomore, and led the team in steals with 47. He had a season-best game in win against Boise State on 16 January 2013, recording 15 points and a team-high seven rebounds, all while battling the flu. He also hit a layup to send the game into overtime, where he scored five points in the extra period to clinch the win. The Lobos once again won the Mountain West regular-season and tournament titles, and reached the second round of the 2013 NCAA Tournament. In 35 games, he averaged 7.0 points, 5.0 rebounds, 2.4 assists and 1.3 steals in 28.5 minutes per game.

==== Junior year ====
As a junior in 2013–14, Greenwood earned All-Conference Honorable Mention for a second consecutive season and Academic All-Mountain West for a third consecutive season. He finished sixth in assist-to-turnover ratio in the NCAA with 105 assists and 30 turnovers (3.5 asst-to). He also recorded 105 assists after tallying 83 as a freshman and as a sophomore. On 21 January 2014, he scored a season-high 20 points against Boise State for his second 20+ point game of his career. The Lobos won the Mountain West Tournament title for a third straight year and once again reached the second round of the NCAA Tournament. In 31 games, he averaged 6.2 points, 5.1 rebounds and 3.4 assists in 31.8 minutes per game.

==== Senior year ====
As a senior in 2014–15, Greenwood earned Academic All-Mountain West (fourth straight year), NABC All-District Second Team, and All-Mountain West Third Team honours. During the season, he became the 33rd Lobo to reach the 1,000-point career mark. He also became the 17th Lobo in program history to reach 1,000 points and 500 rebounds, and joined Lamont Long as the only guards in program history with 1,000 points and 600 rebounds. Greenwood graduated top ten in Lobo history in career minutes played (3,843), assists (372) and made three-point field goals (187). On 20 November 2014, he scored a career-high 24 points against Boston College in the ESPN Puerto Rico Tip-Off. On 21 January 2015, he scored 22 points on six made three-pointers and had eight rebounds against UNLV. During the game, he had his first dunk since his freshman year. He scored in double figures in 18 games, with five of those games being 20-point performances. After dominating the Mountain West Conference for three seasons, Greenwood and the Lobos were knocked out in the first round of the 2015 Mountain West Tournament. In 31 games, he averaged 11.6 points, 5.3 rebounds, 3.3 assists and 1.5 steals in 35.3 minutes per game.

=== Professional ===
After receiving a pre-draft workout invite from the Utah Jazz, Greenwood signed a three-year contract with the Perth Wildcats of the Australian National Basketball League on 1 June 2015. He joined the Wildcats for pre-season in early August. However, on 20 August 2015, Greenwood parted ways with the Wildcats to pursue a career in the Australian Football League (AFL).

=== National team ===
After winning Basketball Australia's Junior Male Player of the Year in 2008, Greenwood joined the Australian Boomers for their 2009 program. At 17 years and 4 months, he was the youngest athlete on the squad. He later made his debut for the Australian Emus under-19 basketball team at the 2009 FIBA Under-19 World Cup in New Zealand. Two years later, he helped the Emus to a sixth-place finish at the 2011 FIBA Under-19 World Cup in Latvia. He averaged 17.1 points, 4.0 rebounds and 2.6 assists per game, and was named to the All-Tournament Team. He helped Australia win its group with a 5–1 record, and finished 6–3 in the tournament overall. He also scored a tournament-best 26 points against the United States.

Greenwood joined an Australian squad for the 2015 World University Games in Gwangju, South Korea.

== AFL career ==
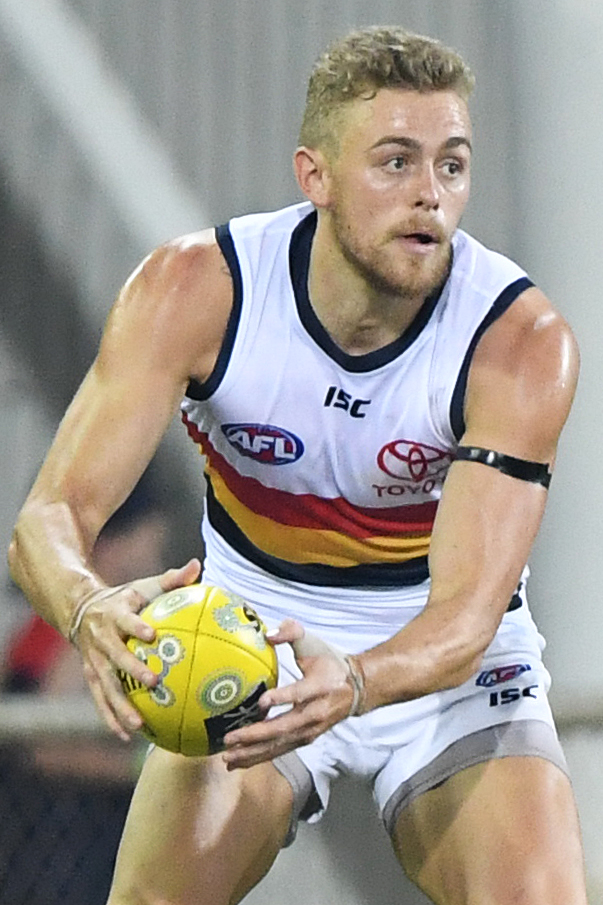
Greenwood playing for Adelaide in June 2019

While at New Mexico, Greenwood was approached by several AFL teams, but he knocked them back to continue with basketball. By mid-August 2015, however, Greenwood had lost the motivation to play basketball and subsequently retired from the game to pursue AFL. After training with the Adelaide Football Club for two weeks, Greenwood signed a two-year category B rookie contract with the club on 4 September 2015.

In 2016, Greenwood made a smooth transition into the Crows' State League side after an eight-year hiatus from competitive football. He played every game of the season, impressing in roles through the midfield and half-forward. He showed strong physicality and developed his ball skills throughout the year, averaging 16 disposals and kicking 25 goals from 21 games, and helped the club reach the SANFL finals for the first time. As a result, he finished sixth in the State League Club Champion award.

On 10 May 2017, the Crows promoted Greenwood to their senior list as possible cover for the concussed Tom Lynch, naming him as an emergency for their Round 8 clash. A week later, the Crows named Greenwood to make his debut on 20 May 2017 against the Brisbane Lions at the Gabba. In his debut, he kicked three first-half goals and finished with 15 disposals, two marks and nine tackles in helping Adelaide defeat Brisbane 140–60. Greenwood quickly became an important part of Adelaide's midfield and impressed in his first season at AFL level, having a mature body and kicking with high efficiency. He was a member of the Crows' 2017 Grand Final side.

At the conclusion of the 2019 AFL season, Greenwood requested a trade to Gold Coast. The trade was finalised on 15 October 2019.

On 11 July 2021, Greenwood sustained a suspected ACL injury to his right knee.

After the 2021 AFL season, as a list measure, the Suns delisted Greenwood with the intent to re-draft him. However, in a shock move, Greenwood instead opted to leave the Suns and sign a two-year deal with North Melbourne.

In August 2024, Green announced his retirement from the AFL. He played 38 senior games for the Kangaroos, including just three in 2024.

In September 2024, Greenwood returned to the Gold Coast Suns as a development coach in the club's AFL program. He subsequently played for the Gold Coast reserves in the Victorian Football League (VFL) in 2025.

== Personal life ==
Greenwood is the son of Mike and Andree Greenwood. His father played water polo and his mother played basketball. Greenwood's sister, Josie, also played college basketball at New Mexico. Greenwood's grandfather, Peter Marquis, won three consecutive VFL premierships with Melbourne between 1955 and 1957.

In 2015, his mother was diagnosed with terminal secondary breast cancer. He subsequently started a charity to raise funds for the UNM Cancer Center in honour of his mother, which received over $50,000 in donations throughout the course of the senior season. Andree was surrounded by her family in Tasmania when she died of breast cancer on 23 October 2017.

== Statistics ==
Legend
G	Goals	K	Kicks	D	Disposals	T	Tackles
B	Behinds	H	Handballs	M	Marks
†	Led the league for the season

Season	Team	No.	Games	Totals							Averages (per game)							Votes
Season	Team	No.	Games	G	B	K	H	D	M	T	G	B	K	H	D	M	T	Votes
2017	Adelaide	20	15	9	4	114	124	238	37	99	0.6	0.3	7.6	8.3	15.9	2.5	6.6	0
2018	Adelaide	1	22	16	17	206	178	384	54	145	0.7	0.8	9.4	8.1	17.5	2.5	6.6	2
2019	Adelaide	1	14	11	5	119	120	239	34	84	0.8	0.4	8.5	8.6	17.1	2.4	6.0	0
2020 (Note: The 2020 season was played with 17 home-and-away matches per team (down from 22) and 16-minute quarters with time on (down from 20-minute quarters with time on) due to the impact of the COVID-19 pandemic.)	Gold Coast	21	17	3	4	173	130	303	27	114	0.2	0.2	10.2	7.6	17.8	1.6	6.7	11
2021	Gold Coast	1	15	6	6	153	110	263	25	130	0.4	0.4	10.2	7.3	17.5	1.7	8.7^{†}	0
2022	North Melbourne	18	21	3	5	156	199	355	46	132	0.1	0.2	7.4	9.5	16.9	2.2	6.3	2
2023	North Melbourne	18	14	3	4	66	135	201	29	69	0.2	0.3	4.7	9.6	14.4	2.1	4.9	0
2024	North Melbourne	1	3	1	1	9	19	28	3	19	0.3	0.3	3.0	6.3	9.3	1.0	6.3	0
2025	North Melbourne	1	0	—	—	—	—	—	—	—	—	—	—	—	—	—	—	0
Career			121	52	46	996	1015	2011	255	792	0.4	0.4	8.2	8.4	16.6	2.1	6.5	15
