= Sacred Heart College, New Town =

Coordinates: 42.861°S 147.303°E

Sacred Heart College
- Hobart, Tasmania; Australia

Information
- Type: Private, co-educational, day school, child care facility
- Motto: Sursum Corda
- Denomination: Roman Catholic
- Established: 1888
- Principal: Elizabeth McDougall
- Staff: 111
- Enrolment: 940 (K–10)
- Colours: White, red and blue
- Affiliation: Sports Association of Tasmanian Independent Schools
- Website: www.shc.tas.edu.au

Sacred Heart College is a catholic school in New Town, Tasmania with an enrolment of 940 students. The school serves students from kindergarten to year 10.

== History ==
Sacred Heart College was founded in 1888. Between 1888 and 1908, Sacred Heart School was conducted by dedicated Catholic lay teachers, among whom was Ethel Saye, who later became well known to generations of pupils as Sr. M Josephine, the Infant Mistress. In 1908, the Sisters of St. Joseph came to New Town to take charge of the school, then known as Sacred Heart Parish School. Sr. M Gabriel Reidy was the first religious principal. The number of pupils attending the school grew steadily with the expansion of the city of Hobart into the northern suburbs.

In 1938, a training centre, or novitiate for student Sisters was purchased. The building, then known as "Restormel" is now the Quinlan Building, and the property on which it stood is now occupied by the secondary school. The 1970s saw expansion with additional classrooms in both the primary and secondary sections, libraries, science laboratories and student and staff amenities. Sports fields were developed in Giblin Street. In 1971, the Finance Advisory Board was constituted as a Board of Management. In 1987, the constitution was revised and in 1989 the college was incorporated to comply with Commonwealth Government directives. The college is now administered by a Board of Directors of the Sisters of St. Joseph advised by the College Advisory Board.

The restructuring of Catholic education in southern Tasmania saw the introduction of co-education into the secondary school in 1994, and the Year 11 and 12 classes were moved to Guilford Young College. In 1995, the school began a dual-stream primary school and a kindergarten.

== Curriculum ==
Sacred Heart College is a junior to senior school running from kindergarten to Year Ten. The school is located in the city of Hobart, in Tasmania, Australia. The school has a history of Christian teachings, stemming back to the school's founding by the Josephite movement in Australia, led by Mary MacKillop.

== Sport ==
Sacred Heart College is a member of the Sports Association of Tasmanian Independent Schools (SATIS).

=== SATIS premierships ===
Sacred Heart College has won the following SATIS premierships.

Girls:

- Athletics (2) – 1977, 1981
- Netball – 1982
- Softball – 1978
- Tennis (3) – 1971, 1973, 1975

== See also ==
- List of schools in Tasmania
- Education in Tasmania
- Roman Catholic Archdiocese of Hobart
- Catholic education in Australia
