= Hartz Tasmania =

Hartz
- Trade name: Hartz
- Type: Private
- Industry: Drink industry
- Founded: 1969 (57 years ago) in Cambridge, Tasmania, Australia
- Headquarters: Cambridge, Tasmania, Australia
- Area served: Tasmania
- Parent: Juicy Isle
- Website: www.hartz.com.au

Hartz is an Australian mineral water and soft drink brand founded in Cambridge, Tasmania, Australia in 1969.

In April 2008, Hartz was placed into administration following financial issues with creditors claiming more than AUD$2 Million owed by the company. Later that year, Hartz was acquired by Juicy Isle, another beverage manufacturer from Tasmania.

== See also ==
- List of soft drinks by country
