= Oakdowns =

- Suburb
- Interactive map of Oakdowns
- Coordinates: 42°54′1″S 147°27′27″E
- Country: Australia
- State: Tasmania
- City: Hobart
- LGA: City of Clarence
- Established: 1990s

Government
  - Federal division: Franklin

Population
  - Total: 1,468 (2016 census)
- Postcode: 7019
Suburbs around Oakdowns
Clarendon Vale
Clarendon Vale	Oakdowns	Lauderdale
Rokeby

Oakdowns is a suburb of Hobart, the capital of Tasmania, Australia. It is within the City of Clarence and not far from Clarendon Vale. At the 2016 Australian Census Oakdowns recorded a population of 1468. Oakdowns has one park. It is a 20-minute drive to the CBD. Most houses have views of Mount wellington and Ralphs bay.

== Recreation ==
Oakdowns Park is the only park in Oakdowns. The park has a rivulet running through it and has grounds suitable for ball games. Many people walk their dogs throughout the park and take their family to play on the play equipment. There is a bike trail that follows South Arm Highway to the city known as an intercity cycle way. Near the Rokeby Village is Percy Park which is less than a kilometer away from Oakdowns. There is a cricket and soccer ground and games are held there.

== Retail ==
There are no stores in Oakdowns, however there are a range of shops including; hair dresser, take away food outlets, service station, coffee, doctors surgery, pharmacy and other various businesses on the border between Rokeby and Oakdowns on the South Arm highway. There is also a supermarket in Lauderdale for residents to shop for items that are required.

== Transport ==
Oakdowns is serviced by Metro routes 634, 635, X34 and X35. There are numerous bus stops in Oakdowns which are:

- Horsham Road
- Sharon Drive
- Oakdowns Park on Oakdowns Parade
- Oakdowns Parade
