= Roches Beach =

Roches Beach Hobart, Tasmania
- Coordinates: 42°53′23″S 147°29′46″E
- Population: 220 (2021 census)
- Postcode(s): 7170
- Location: 19 km (12 mi) E of Rosny Park
- LGA(s): City of Clarence
- Region: Hobart
- State electorate(s): Franklin
- Federal division(s): Franklin
Suburbs around Roches Beach:
Acton Park	Acton Park	Frederick Henry Bay
Acton Park	Roches Beach	Frederick Henry Bay
Acton Park	Lauderdale	Frederick Henry Bay

Roches Beach is a rural residential locality in the local government area (LGA) of Clarence in the Hobart LGA region of Tasmania. The locality is about 19 kilometres (12 mi) east of the town of Rosny Park. The 2021 Census recorded a population of 220 for the state suburb of Roches Beach. It is a suburb of Hobart, between Lauderdale and Acton Park.

== History ==
Roches Beach was gazetted as a locality in 1958. It was named for an early settler.

== Geography ==
The waters of Frederick Henry Bay form the eastern boundary.

== Road infrastructure ==
Route C330 (Acton Road) passes to the west. From there, Roches Beach Road provides access to the locality.
