= Sam Rainbird =

Australian cricketer

Personal information
- Full name: Samuel Leigh Rainbird
- Born: 5 June 1992 (age 34); Hobart, Tasmania, Australia
- Nickname: Drought Fish
- Height: 183 cm (6 ft 0 in)
- Batting: Right-handed
- Bowling: Left-arm medium-fast
- Role: Bowler

Domestic team information
- Years: Team
- 2012/13 – 2023: Tasmania (squad no. 43)
- 2015/16–2016/17: Hobart Hurricanes (squad no. 43)
- 2018/19: Sydney Thunder (squad no. 43)
- 2020/21: Melbourne Stars (squad no. 43)

Career statistics
Competition	FC	LA	T20
Matches	56	26	24
Runs scored	898	85	34
Batting average	14.03	8.50	4.85
100s/50s	0/2	0/0	0/0
Top score	59	21	15
Balls bowled	10,139	1,223	451
Wickets	170	29	17
Bowling average	32.35	39.17	39.35
5 wickets in innings	4	1	0
10 wickets in match	1	0	0
Best bowling	8/21	5/29	3/37
Catches/stumpings	16/–	7/–	8/–
- Source: CricInfo, 25 October 2024

Samuel Leigh Rainbird (born 5 June 1992) is a former Australian cricketer. He is a left-arm fast bowler. He is best known for his time with Tasmania and multiple Big Bash League franchises.

Before his first contract with Tasmania in 2011, Rainbird played Australian Rules Football for the Clarence Football Club in the Tasmanian Football League. He was born in Hobart and was educated at MacKillop College and Guilford Young College.

In March 2022, during the 2021–22 Sheffield Shield season, Rainbird took eight wickets for 21 runs against Queensland, recording the best bowling figures for Tasmania in a first-class match. Rainbird then took a five-wicket haul in the second innings of the match, resulting in the best match figures for Tasmania in the Sheffield Shield, with totals of 13 for 42.
