= Howrah, Tasmania =

Howrah
- Suburb
- Interactive map of Howrah
- Coordinates: 42°53′19″S 147°24′20″E
- Country: Australia
- State: Tasmania
- Region: Hobart
- City: Hobart
- LGA: Clarence
- Location: 5 km (3.1 mi) SE of Rosny Park; 12 km (7.5 mi) E of Hobart

Government
  - State electorate: Franklin
  - Federal division: Franklin

Population
  - Total: 9,545 (2021 census)
- Postcode: 7018
Suburbs around Howrah
Bellerive	Mornington	Mount Rumney
River Derwent	Howrah	Rokeby
River Derwent	Tranmere	Rokeby

Howrah is a residential locality in the local government area (LGA) of Clarence in the south-east region of Tasmania. The locality is about 5 kilometres (3.1 mi) south-east of the town of Rosny Park. The 2021 Census recorded a population of 9,545 for the suburb of Howrah. It is a suburb of the City of Clarence. It is east of Bellerive and north of Tranmere.

Howrah is a beachside suburb, with views across the River Derwent to Hobart City from Howrah Beach. Clarence Street runs through the centre of the suburb separating the hillside section from the beachside.

Howrah has a number of parks including Wentworth Park, which is one of the key sport (such as soccer, field hockey, rugby league and touch football) and recreation areas on the Eastern Shore.

Clarence High School is generally thought to be in Howrah, due to it being located east of Wentworth Street, however it is in Bellerive. Howrah has a primary school.

Shoreline Plaza is the largest shopping centre in Howrah.

== History ==
Howrah was named after Howrah House, a property established in the 1830s on Clarence Plains by a retired Indian Army officer who took the name from a place of the same name near Calcutta.

Dora Isabel Baudinet died in 1945 leaving 10 acres and her assets to found the Tasmanian Sunshine Centre in Howrah in 1951. The home offered holidays to less privileged children until 1980.

Howrah was gazetted as a locality in 1963.

== Geography ==
The waters of the River Derwent form the south-western boundary.

== Road infrastructure ==
Route B33 (South Arm Highway) runs through from north-west to east.
