= Michael Sharland =

Michael Stanley Reid Sharland (1899–1987) was an Australian journalist, photographer, author and amateur ornithologist. He was born, and spent most of his life, in Tasmania, though he also lived and worked in Sydney, Melbourne and London.

Sharland was very active in ornithological organisations. He joined the Royal Australasian Ornithologists Union (RAOU) in 1921 and served on its Migration Committee 1926–1932, as Branch Secretary or Councillor for New South Wales while living in that state 1934–1941, and as Branch Secretary for Tasmania 1942–1964. He also served as RAOU President 1949–1951. In 1971 he initiated the formation of the Bird Observers Association of Tasmania.

As well as numerous papers and articles, books he authored include:

- 1945 - Tasmanian Birds. A field guide to the birds inhabiting Tasmania and adjacent islands, including the sea birds. Mercury Press: Hobart.
- 1952 - Stones of a Century. Oldham, Beddome & Meredith: Hobart.
- 1958 - Tasmanian Birds. A field guide to the birds inhabiting Tasmania and adjacent islands, including the sea birds. Angus & Robertson: Sydney.
- 1963 - Tasmanian Wild Life. A popular account of the furred land mammals, snakes and introduced mammals of Tasmania. Melbourne University Press: Parkville.
- 1964 - A Territory of Birds. Rigby Ltd: Adelaide.
- 1967 - Birds of the Sun. Angus & Robertson Ltd: Sydney.
- 1971 - A Pocketful of Nature. The Mercury: Hobart.
- 1976 - " Once Upon a Time in Tasmania....Tasmanian Tales". Davies Brothers Limited: Hobart.
- 1981 - A Guide to the Birds of Tasmania. Drinkwater Publishing: Hobart.
