= MacKillop College, Mornington =

MacKillop Catholic College

Location
- Mornington, Tasmania; Australia; 42.8579°S 147.4003°E

Information
- Type: Independent co-educational secondary school
- Motto: In Faith and Hope and Love
- Religious affiliations: Roman Catholic; Christian Brothers; Josephites
- Established: 1994; 32 years ago
- Principal: Brendan Gill
- Years: 7– 12
- Enrolment: 815
- Colours: Red, white and blue
- Slogan: In Faith and Hope and Love
- Song: In Faith, Hope and Love composed by Gabrielle Streat
- Affiliation: Sports Association of Tasmanian Independent Schools, Association of Josephite Affiliated Secondary Schools, Edmund Rice Education Australia
- Website: www.mackillop.tas.edu.au

MacKillop Catholic College is an independent Roman Catholic co-educational college for Years 7 to 12 in the Hobart suburb of Mornington, Tasmania, Australia. It is named in honour of the Australian educationalist, nun and co-founder of the Institute of the Sisters of St Joseph of the Sacred Heart, Mary MacKillop. The college also has an association with the Christian Brothers founded by Edmund Rice. MacKillop and Rice are key sources of inspiration for the school community. MacKillop Catholic College is the only Catholic secondary college servicing Hobart's eastern shore. The current principal of Mackillop Catholic College, Brendan Gill was appointed the role after serving his time as Acting Principal. Brendan Gill is also known to the Mackillop Community as 'The Man of the People.'

The college is a member of the Sports Association of Tasmanian Independent Schools.

== History ==
MacKillop Catholic College was part of a restructuring of Catholic education in the Archdiocese of Hobart during the early 1990s, although moves to establish a Catholic secondary school on the eastern shore of Hobart had begun in the 1960s. In 1993 the Catholic Church purchased the site and buildings of Mornington Primary School, which had ceased operation as a state primary school at the end of 1992. MacKillop was opened on the site on 9 February 1994, with 59 students. By 2009 the enrolment had grown to more than 500 students. Over the first 10 years of the school's operation, a staged building program was implemented, with the eighth stage completed in 2004.

== Houses ==
The college is named after Mary MacKillop, an Australian educator and saint of the Catholic Church. The houses are named after significant places and people related to the religious institutes of the college- the Christian Brothers and Sisters of St Joseph of the Sacred Heart. Waterford, Rice, and Sion houses are collectively known as Rice Houses, in honour of Edmund Ignatius Rice and the Christian Brothers. Tenison, Fitzroy, and Penola houses are collectively known as MacKillop Houses, in honour of Mary MacKillop and the Sisters of St Joseph of the Sacred Heart.

== Notable past students ==
- Hugh Greenwood – AFL Footballer
- Sam Rainbird – Cricketer
- Josh Green – AFL player
- Riley Meredith – Cricketer
- Julian Pollard – Cricketer

== See also ==
- List of schools in Tasmania
- Education in Tasmania
