= Opossum Bay =

- Suburb
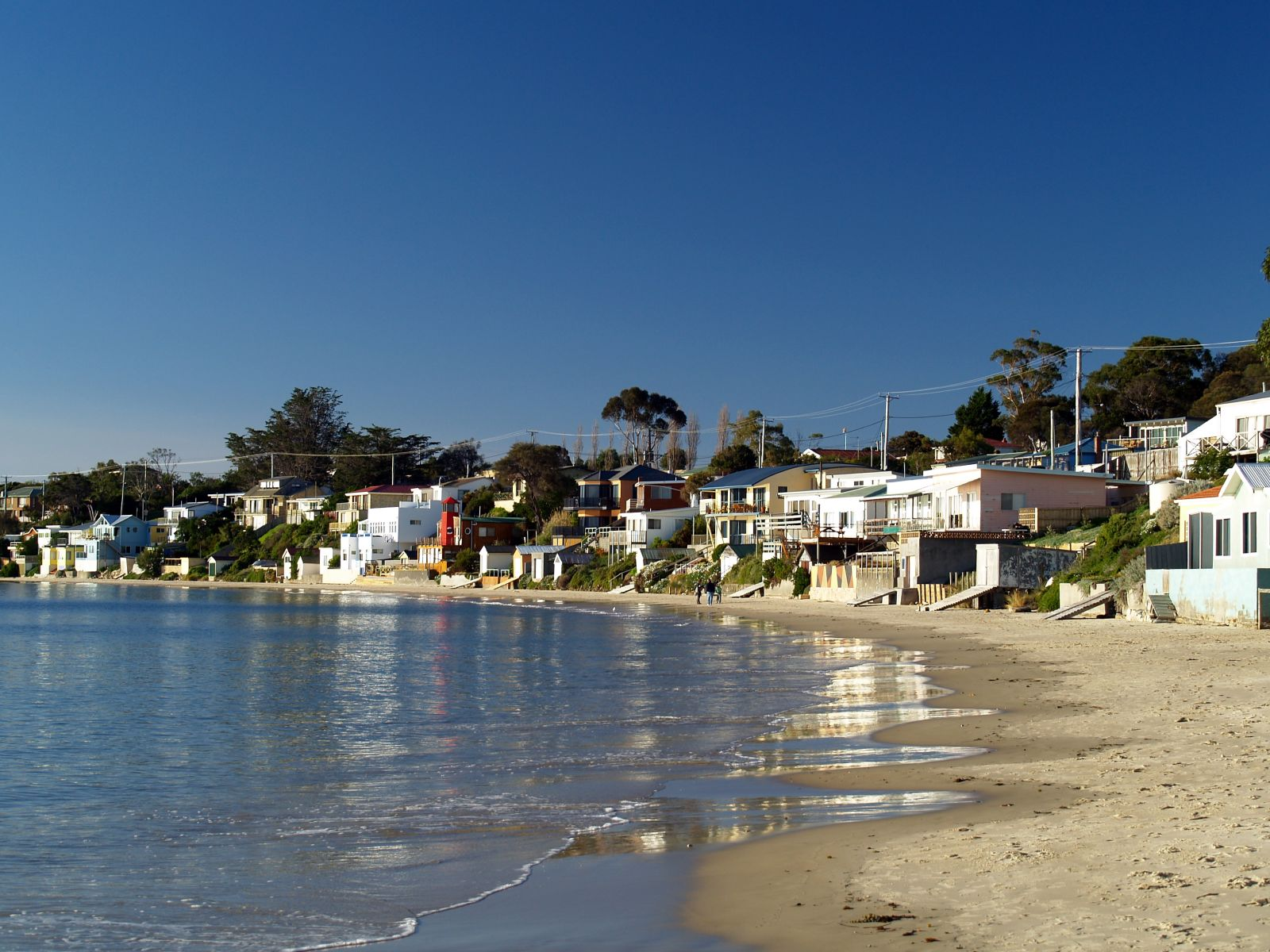
- Beach at Opossum Bay

- Interactive map of Opossum Bay
- Coordinates: 42°59′38″S 147°24′12″E
- Country: Australia
- State: Tasmania
- Region: Hobart
- City: Hobart
- LGA: Clarence
- Location: 5 km (3.1 mi) N of South Arm; 25 km (16 mi) SW of Lauderdale; 37 km (23 mi) SE of Rosny Park

Government
  - State electorate: Franklin
  - Federal division: Franklin

Population
  - Total: 329 (2016 census)
- Postcode: 7023
Suburbs around Opossum Bay
River Derwent	River Derwent	Ralphs Bay
River Derwent	Opossum Bay	Ralphs Bay
River Derwent	South Arm	Ralphs Bay

Opossum Bay is a rural residential locality in the local government area of Clarence in the Hobart region of Tasmania. The locality is about 37 kilometres (23 mi) south-east of the town of Rosny Park. The 2016 census recorded a population of 329 for the state suburb of Opossum Bay.

It is located on the South Arm Peninsula on the outskirts of Hobart.

== History ==
Opossum Bay was gazetted as a locality in 1967.

Opossum Bay Post Office opened on 16 January 1942 and closed in 1980.

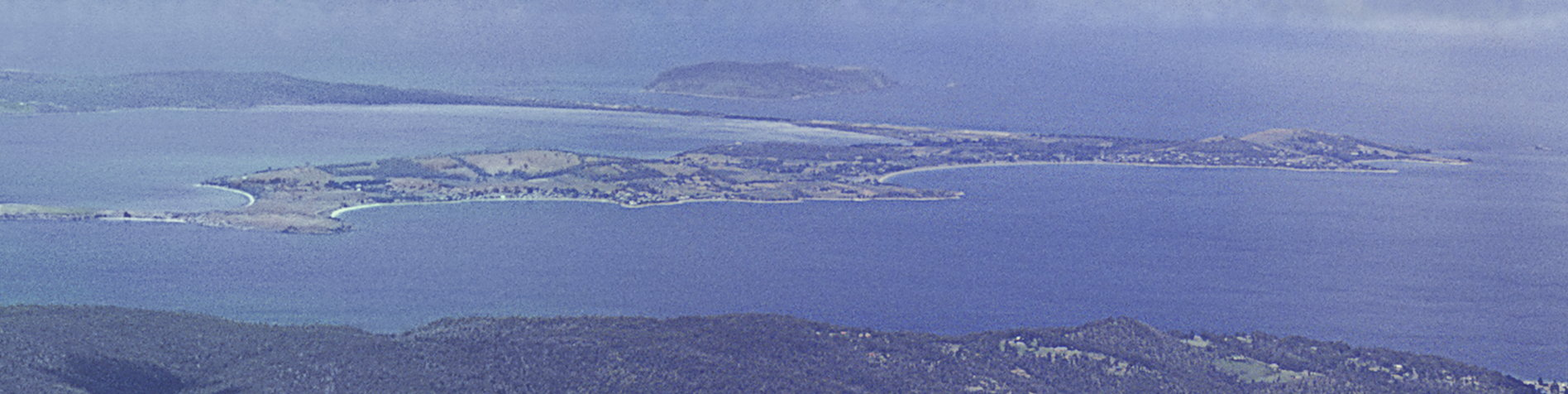
Opossum Bay area from Mount Wellington summit

The origin of Opossum Bay's name is unclear.

In 1997, Opossum Bay received national attention when it was the location of where Labor Senator Nick Sherry had an overnight stay with his mother and was accused of misusing his travel allowances for this stay. The controversy that ensued led to Sherry attempting suicide, which he survived.

== Geography ==
The River Derwent forms the western and northern boundaries, and Ralphs Bay the eastern.

Opossum Bay is nearly surrounded by water. The Gellibrand Point, Opossum Bay and South Arm Town area is connected to the rest of the South Arm Peninsula by a narrow isthmus. The proximity to the River Derwent and Ralphs Bay can result in Opossum Bay frequently being cooled by sea breezes in summer.

== Road infrastructure ==
The B33 route (South Arm Road) enters from the south-east and runs north to the town, where it ends.

== Notable residents ==
- Brian Ritchie – bass guitarist for the band Violent Femmes.
