= South Arm Peninsula =

Peninsula in Tasmania, Australia

Coordinates: 42.972°S 147.496°E

South Arm Peninsula is a peninsula that lies on the east side of the mouth of the River Derwent south of Hobart in Tasmania, Australia. The peninsula commences at Lauderdale and curves landward or inward on a narrow isthmus that has South Arm situated on the east side of the Derwent, across from Blackmans Bay on the west side. Opossum Bay is the northernmost populated place on the northward curve.

Ralphs Bay lies in the area defined by the peninsula to the west, while Storm Bay lies to the south of the peninsula, Frederick Henry Bay to the east side that separates from the Tasman Peninsula. The peninsula is located in the City of Clarence.

There are a number of organisations that use the name of the peninsula.
