= Mount Carmel College, Sandy Bay =

Catholic girls' school in Hobart, Australia

Mount Carmel College

Location
- Hobart, Tasmania; Australia; 42°54′04″S 147°19′59″E

Information
- Type: Independent co-educational and single-sex primary and secondary day school
- Motto: Latin: Fortes in Fide (Strong in Faith)
- Religious affiliation: Sisters of Charity
- Denomination: Roman Catholicism
- Established: 1942; 84 years ago
- Principal: Megan Richardson
- Staff: ~70
- Years: K–10
- Gender: K–2: co-educational; K–10: girls only
- Enrolment: ~540 (K–10)
- Colours: Navy blue, gold and white
- Affiliations: Sports Association of Tasmanian Independent Schools; Alliance of Girls' Schools Australasia; Association of Heads of Independent Schools of Australia
- Website: www.mountcarmel.tas.edu.au

Mount Carmel College is an independent Roman Catholic single-sex primary and secondary day school for girls, located in Sandy Bay, a suburb of Hobart, Tasmania, Australia. It was established in 1942 by the Sisters of Charity. The school currently caters for approximately 540 students from Year K to Year 10. Boys are enrolled from Year K to Year 2, and girls from Year K to Year 10.

Mount Carmel College is a member of the Sports Association of Tasmanian Independent Schools (SATIS), the Alliance of Girls' Schools Australasia, and the Association of Heads of Independent Schools of Australia (AHISA).

== History ==
Mount Carmel College was founded by the Sisters of Charity in 1942. The Sisters of Charity were the first group of religious women to come to Australia in 1838 and to Tasmania in 1847. Their focus from the beginning was to improve educational opportunities, especially for young women; a focus which continues today at the college. "Little Mount Carmel" began in a house in View Street, Sandy Bay, and transferred to "Lauramont" on its present site in 1947.

Ten years later St. Joseph's closed and secondary classes were transferred to Mount Carmel which developed into a Preparatory to Grade 12 College. Large building programmes in the 1960s and the 1980s saw the college continue to expand and develop its resources and specialist facilities.

With the establishment of Guilford Young College for senior secondary students, Mount Carmel became a Preparatory to Grade 10 College from 1995. In 1997 a Kindergarten was opened and in 1998 the college entered a new phase in its history with the appointment of the first lay Principal.

=== St Joseph's College ===
St Joseph's School opened in 1847. It originally consisted of separate Boys and Girls Schools in the one building, St Joseph's Boys’ School, and St Joseph's Girls’ School. At this point it was located Behind St Joseph's Church in the CBD. 1n 1893 the boys were transferred to a new school on the corner of Harrington and Patrick Streets. The Sisters of Charity retained some boys’ infant classes, though. The new St Joseph's school Building on the corner of Molle and Macquarie streets (now Collegiate's middle school), opened in 1923. At this time the school expanded into secondary classes, and was called St Joseph's Secondary School. In 1926 it was renamed St Joseph's College. In 1957 the secondary classes were transferred to Mount Carmel in sandy bay, and became known as Mount Carmel College. St Joseph's remained as a primary school until 1964, when the school moved to south Hobart as St Francis Xavier's School.

== Campus ==
Mount Carmel College is located on a single campus on a site overlooking the River Derwent in suburban Sandy Bay, just 5–10 minutes to the Hobart city centre. As the primary school is on the same campus as the secondary school, the primary students share major facilities with the secondary school, and regularly use many of the other facilities. The University of Tasmania is located just across the road, a few minutes walk from the school. Mount Carmel students have access to and regularly use the university sports facilities, including two ovals, five tennis/netball/basketball courts, the sports hall, squash courts, and the gym.

== Facilities ==
Major building works have continued in the late nineties until the present time. These works include the creation of a meeting room and toilet renovation in the Lauramont building (2000), the refurbishment of the primary toilets (2000), refurbishment of the Science Laboratories and the creation of a sacred space (2001), the purchase and renovation of the former Convent, now known as Providence House (February, 2002), the refurbishment of primary classrooms (2003), the refurbishment of secondary classrooms (January, 2004), the creation of the Arts Technology building (completed February, 2004), resurfacing of the tennis court area and the most recent project, the Library and Classroom redevelopment (completed August, 2005).

There has also been a significant upgrade to two of the Year Seven classrooms and their environs and a major refurbishment of the upper level of the Primary building and the access to the Primary School as a whole, and the whole of the playground equipment has been replaced and updated. In 2009 a Performing Arts Complex was created.

== House system ==
Mount Carmel College has three houses: Lourdes, Loreto, and Carmel. All three houses are named after Holy places that are important to Catholics. The houses compete for the house cup by participating in sports carnivals, House drama, Beach day, and can gain extra points for things such as singing practice for Masses and Mount Carmel day, Bringing notices and Forms back on time, and Getting student diaries signed for being used properly.

== Curriculum ==
In the Primary School (K–6), set subjects are studied in each year level. the younger grades (K–3) have most subjects with their class teacher. Usually, the only subjects they have with other teachers are library, P.E, music, and Japanese. The older grades (4–6) usually have more subjects with other teachers, though they are still the same subjects as before.

In the secondary school, Grade 7's study set subjects, including some new ones that aren't offered in primary school. Grade 8's have the same subjects but can pick a language from either Japanese or French. Grade 9 and 10's have six core subjects(English, History, Theology and Spirituality, maths, science, HPE) and choose three electives.

== Co-curriculum ==
=== Sport ===
The School Participates in various sports through SATIS. They do very well for a small school, with grand finals often being between Mount Carmel and Collegiate.

=== Performing arts ===
Mount Carmel has choirs and bands that perform at various school and community events. House Drama is held every year, and the School Production every second year. The school hall doubles as a theatre, and has been used for auditions and rehearsals for a number of local productions.

=== Other ===
The School has debating and Tournament of Minds teams, offers involvement in outreach projects( e.g. visits to help at Bethlehem house, a homeless shelter), and supports various charities, particularly St Vincent De Paul. There are Committees for St Vincent De Paul and Amnesty International. Mount Carmel also competes in academic competitions, and programs like the Premier's Reading Challenge.

== See also ==
- List of schools in Tasmania
- Education in Tasmania
