= Lauderdale, Tasmania =

Lauderdale
- Suburb
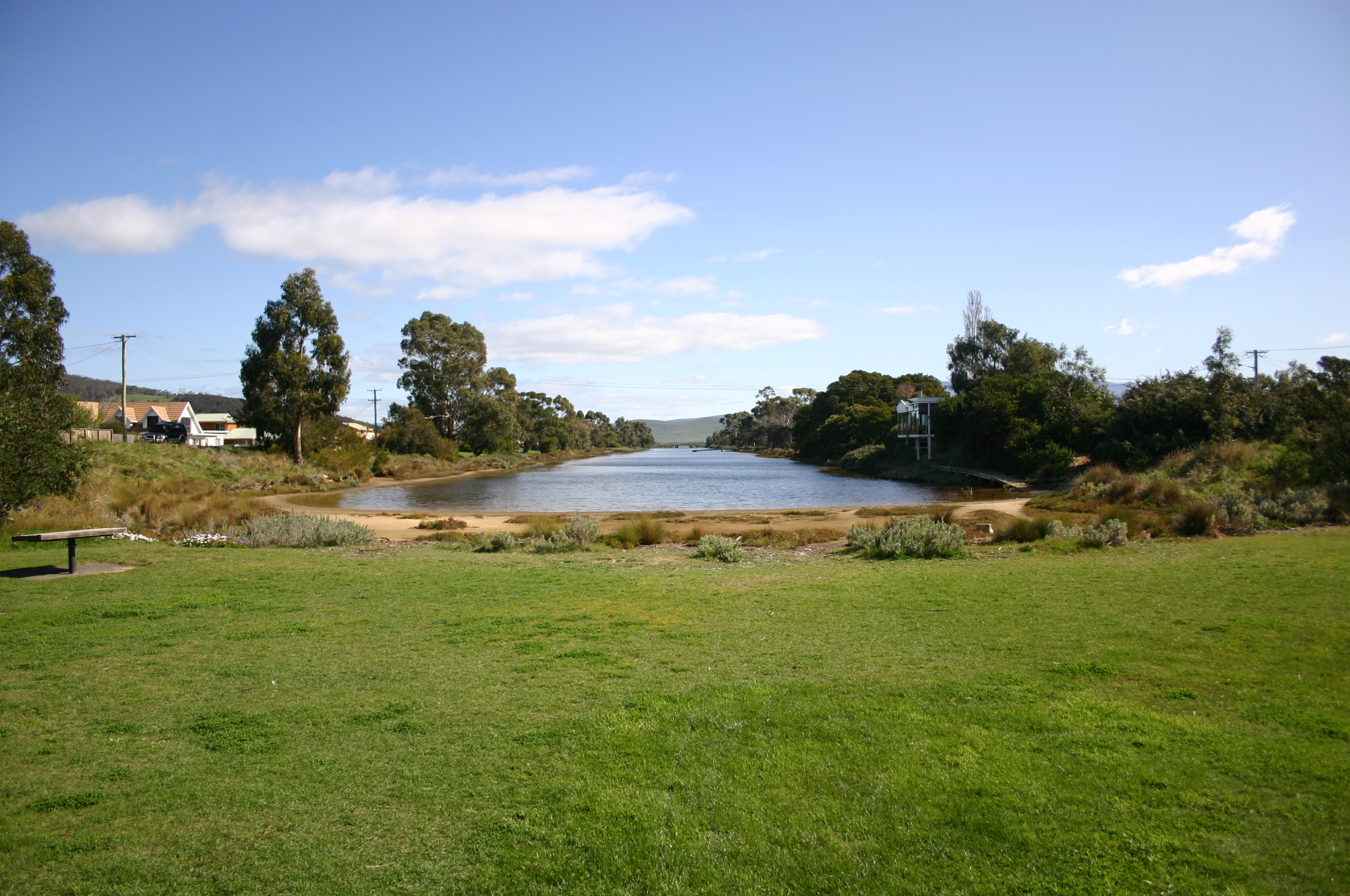

- Interactive map of Lauderdale
- Coordinates: 42°54′40″S 147°29′34″E
- Country: Australia
- State: Tasmania
- City: Hobart
- LGA: City of Clarence
- Location: 14 km (8.7 mi) E of Rosny Park; 20 km (12 mi) E of Hobart; 25 km (16 mi) NE of Opossum Bay

Government
  - State electorate: Franklin
  - Federal division: Franklin

Population
  - Total: 2,592 (SAL 2021)
- Time zone: UTC+10
  - Summer (DST): UTC+11
- Postcode: 7021
Suburbs around Lauderdale
| Acton Park | Roches Beach | Frederick Henry Bay |
| Oakdowns | Lauderdale | Frederick Henry Bay |
| Ralphs Bay | Sandford | Frederick Henry Bay |

Lauderdale is a town on the outskirts of Hobart, capital of Tasmania, Australia. The population of Lauderdale is approximately 2,592 (2021 census). It is in the local government area of City of Clarence. The town is situated on the eastern side of a thin isthmus that connects the South Arm Peninsula to the mainland. It faces Ralphs Bay, and the majority of Lauderdale's population live along Roches Beach, which faces Frederick Henry Bay. Along with nearby Seven Mile Beach, it is a popular residential area for people working in the Hobart CBD.

Lauderdale/Roches Beach is overlooked by Single Hill, which is just to the North. Beyond Single Hill is the town of Seven Mile Beach. The view from Single Hill gives a clear view of the town of Lauderdale.

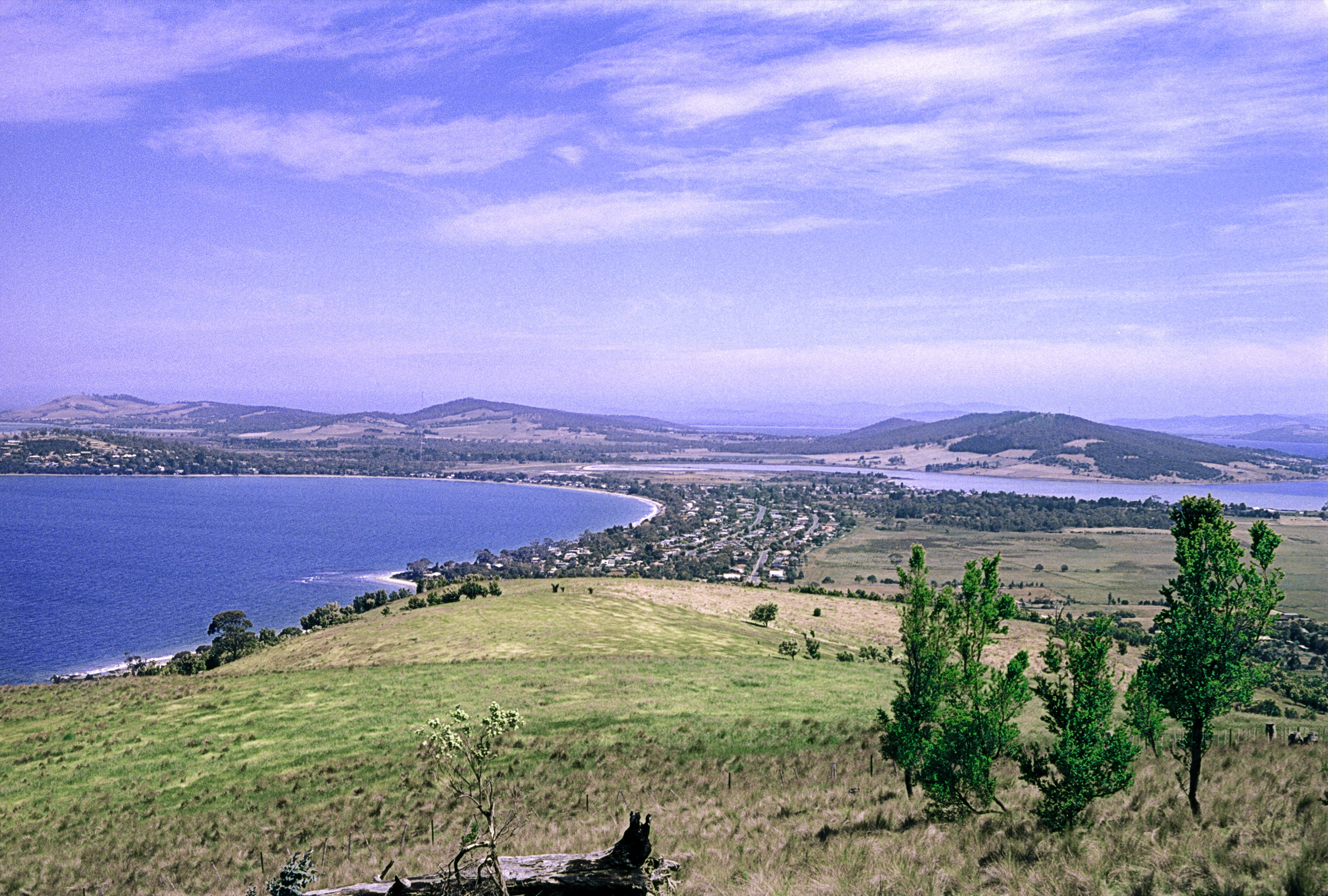
View from Single Hill

The view also shows the nearby ABC radio transmitter mast. The Ralphs Bay side of Lauderdale reveals a sharp gradient in the bay where the water changes colour. This change can be especially noticeable when driving along the main road from Hobart.

Walker Corporation had plans to build a large residential 'canal estate' in Ralphs Bay in front of Lauderdale. There were many protests against the development on ecological grounds; the development would be over sensitive mud flats and affect the habitat of migratory birds and the endangered spotted handfish. Former State Premier Paul Lennon was very much in favour of the development whilst acting as premier. He has close relations with Walker Corp. In June 2010, Ralphs Bay was saved when the Tasmanian Planning Commission rejected the proposed 'Lauderdale Quay' canal housing development. However the Legislative Council of the Tasmanian Parliament debated the Canal Estates (Prohibition) Bill 2011 on 7 July 2012 and voted against this legislation. So while the Ralphs Bay development will not go ahead the way is still open to other developments.

== Recreation areas of Lauderdale ==
- Lauderdale Oval (Lauderdale Bombers FC)
- Lauderdale skate park & recreation area
- Lauderdale Yacht Club & boat ramp
- Orana Girl Guide Camp
- Canal boat ramp
- Canal jetty
- Canal barbecue area
- Bayview Park/barbecue area
- Epping Play Park/barbecue area

Lauderdale has a primary school and childcare centre, along with a Christian church (Abundant Life Church).

== Accidents and incidents ==
On 10 March 1946 a Douglas DC-3 aircraft operated by Australian National Airways departed from Cambridge Aerodrome with a crew of 4 and 21 passengers for Essendon Airport. Less than 2 minutes after take-off the aircraft crashed at Seven Mile Beach, killing all on board. At the time it was Australia's worst civil aviation accident.
