= Cambridge, Tasmania =

Cambridge
- Suburb
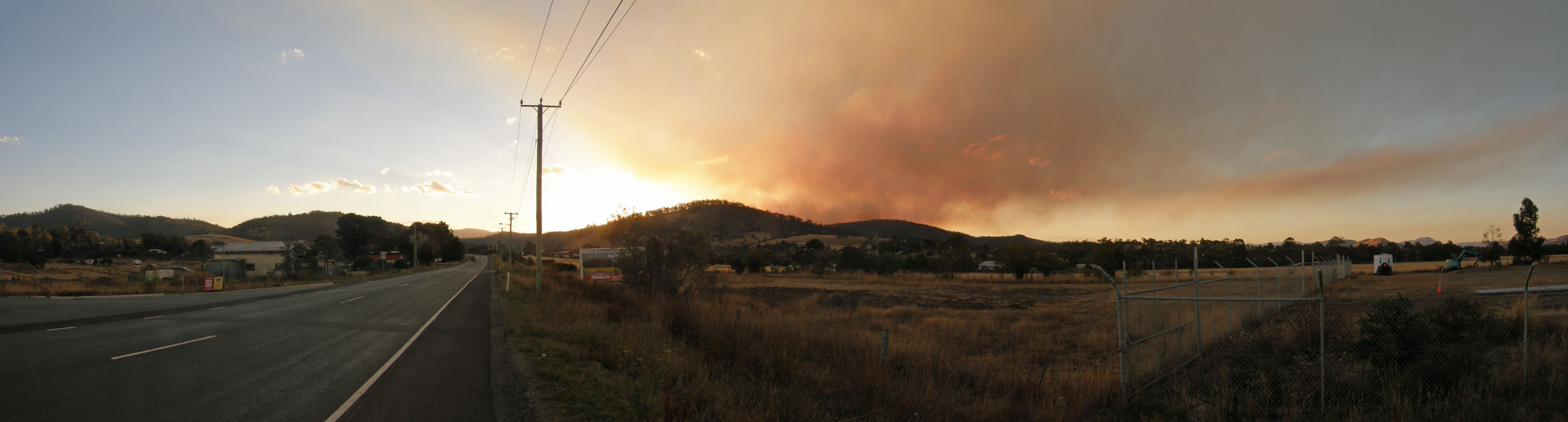
- A Panoramic photo taken in Cambridge of bush fire smoke over the horizon.

- Interactive map of Cambridge
- Coordinates: 42°50′12″S 147°26′28″E
- Country: Australia
- State: Tasmania
- City: Hobart
- LGA: City of Clarence

Government
  - Federal division: Franklin

Population
  - Total: 1,454 (SAL 2021)
Suburbs around Cambridge
		Richmond
Flagstaff Gully	Cambridge	Midway Point
Mornington	Acton Park	Seven Mile Beach

Cambridge is a suburb in the greater area of Hobart, capital of Tasmania, Australia. It is in the City of Clarence local government area. The suburb is situated in close proximity to Hobart Airport and the Cambridge Aerodrome (Cambridge Airport), and is approximately 18 km to Hobart via the Tasman Highway. In recent years Cambridge had developed an Industrial estate and has become a popular commuter town for people working in Hobart.

== Population ==
In the 2016 Census, there were 1,161 people in Cambridge. 87.6% of people were born in Australia and 95.1% of people spoke only English at home. The most common responses for religion were No Religion 36.1%, Anglican 23.7% and Catholic 23.5%.

== Retail/facilities of Cambridge ==
- BP Service station
- Cambridge Primary school
- The Cambridge Centre Shopping Centre
- Hartz Tasmania – Soft drinks
