= Tranmere, Tasmania =

Tranmere
- Suburb
- Interactive map of Tranmere
- Coordinates: 42°55′22″S 147°24′59″E
- Country: Australia
- State: Tasmania
- Region: Hobart
- City: Hobart
- LGA: City of Clarence
- Location: 9 km (5.6 mi) SE of Rosny Park

Government
  - State electorate: Franklin
  - Federal division: Franklin

Population
  - Total: 1,701 (2016 census)
- Postcode: 7018
Suburbs around Tranmere
| Howrah | Howrah | Rokeby |
| River Derwent | Tranmere | Rokeby |
| River Derwent | River Derwent | Rokeby |

Tranmere (palawa kani: trumanyapayna) is a rural residential locality in the local government area (LGA) of Clarence in the Hobart LGA region of Tasmania. The locality is about 9 kilometres (5.6 mi) south-east of the town of Rosny Park. The 2016 census recorded a population of 1701 for the state suburb of Tranmere. It is a suburb of greater Hobart. It is accessed from, and shares a border with Howrah, which lies to its north. Rokeby lies to its east. Historically referred to as

Tranmere is a riverside suburb, with views across the River Derwent to the Hobart city centre.

== History ==
The stretch of land from Droughty Point to Tranmere was historically known as trumanyapayna, in what is recognised as the paredareme region. Tranmere was gazetted as a locality in 1970. It may have been named for a ship which brought livestock from England in 1827.

== Geography ==
The waters of the River Derwent estuary form the western and southern boundaries.

== Road infrastructure ==
Route B33 (South Arm Highway) passes to the north. From there, Oceana Drive and Tranmere Road provide access to the locality.
