= Mornington, Tasmania =

Mornington Hobart, Tasmania
- Coordinates: 42°51′30″S 147°24′14″E
- Population: 2,265 (2016 census)
- Postcode(s): 7018
- Location: 4 km (2 mi) NE of Rosny Park
- LGA(s): Clarence
- Region: Hobart
- State electorate(s): Franklin
- Federal division(s): Franklin
Suburbs around Mornington:
Warrane	Warrane	Cambridge
Warrane	Mornington	Mount Rumney
Bellerive	Howrah	Rokeby

Mornington is a residential locality in the local government area (LGA) of Clarence in the Hobart LGA region of Tasmania. The locality is about 4 kilometres (2.5 mi) north-east of the town of Rosny Park. The 2016 census recorded a population of 2265 for the state suburb of Mornington.

It is a suburb of the City of Clarence. It is part of greater Hobart, located approximately 7 kilometres from the CBD. It is located between Warrane and Cambridge, is nearby to Mount Rumney and runs parallel to the Tasman Highway.

Mornington is a primarily residential suburb, although it is also home to the Mornington Industrial Estate and is served by Rosny Park for commercial services. The main facilities are Clarence Council Depot, Main Roads and Transport Depot, a Service Tasmania vehicle inspection facility, a Fire and Ambulance Service, and MacKillop College.

== History ==
Mornington was gazetted as a locality in 1970.

== Geography ==
Most of the boundaries are survey lines.

== Road infrastructure ==
Route A3 (Tasman Highway) runs through from north-west to north-east, and Route B33 (South Arm Highway) runs from north-west to south-east.
