= South Arm, Tasmania =

South Arm
- Suburb
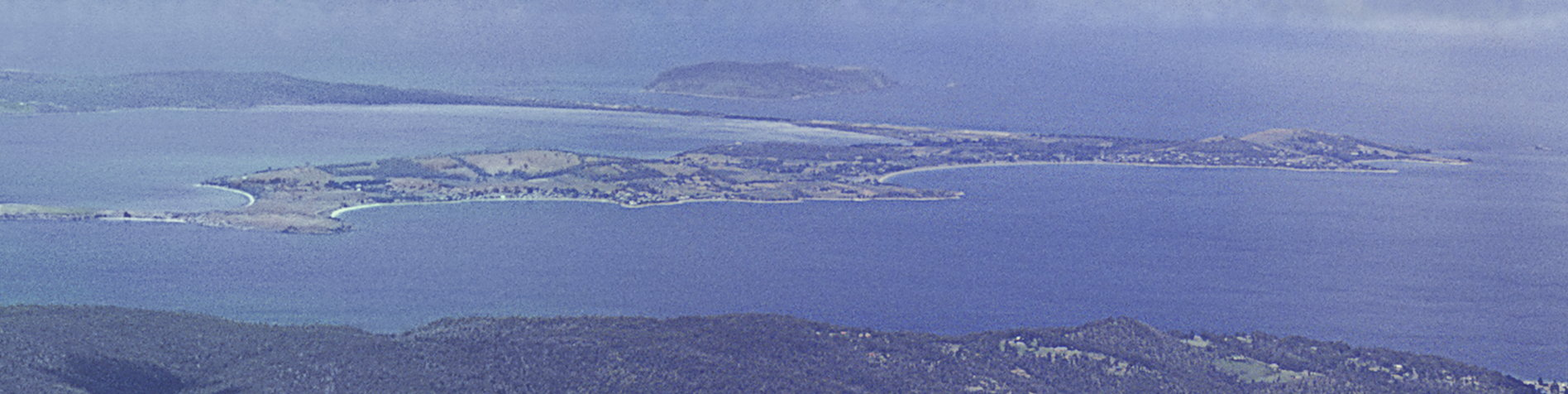
- South Arm from Mount Wellington

- Interactive map of South Arm
- Coordinates: 43°1′42″S 147°25′1″E
- Country: Australia
- State: Tasmania
- Region: Hobart
- City: Hobart
- LGA: Clarence
- Location: 32 km (20 mi) SE of Rosny Park

Government
  - State electorate: Franklin
  - Federal division: Franklin

Population
  - Total: 963 (SAL 2021)
- Postcode: 7022
Suburbs around South Arm
River Derwent	Opossum Bay	Ralphs Bay
River Derwent	South Arm	Clifton Beach
Storm Bay	Storm Bay	Storm Bay

South Arm is a rural residential locality in the local government area of Clarence in the Hobart region of Tasmania. The locality is about 32 kilometres (20 mi) south-east of the town of Rosny Park. The 2016 census recorded a population of 880 for the state suburb of South Arm.

== History ==
South Arm was gazetted as a locality in 1967.

South Arm Post Office opened on 6 February 1856.

== Geography ==
The River Derwent forms the western boundary, and Storm Bay the southern. Ralphs Bay forms most of the northern boundary.

The locality is located on the South Arm Peninsula on the outskirts of the greater Hobart area in Tasmania.

== Road infrastructure ==
The B33 route (South Arm Road) enters from the south-east and runs through to the north-west, where it exits.

== Sources ==
(Google Maps)
