= Clarendon Vale =

- Suburb
- Interactive map of Clarendon Vale
- Coordinates: 42°53′36″S 147°26′47″E
- Country: Australia
- State: Tasmania
- Region: Hobart
- City: Hobart
- LGA: City of Clarence
- Location: 10 km (6.2 mi) SE of Rosny Park

Government
  - State electorate: Franklin
  - Federal division: Franklin

Population
  - Total: 1,267 (2016 census)
- Postcode: 7019
Suburbs around Clarendon Vale
Rokeby	Rokeby	Acton Park
Rokeby	Clarendon Vale	Rokeby, Acton Park
Rokeby	Rokeby	Rokeby

Clarendon Vale is a rural residential locality in the local government area (LGA) of Clarence in the Hobart LGA region of Tasmania. The locality is about 10 kilometres (6.2 mi) south-east of the town of Rosny Park. The 2016 census recorded a population of 1267 for the state suburb of Clarendon Vale. It is a suburb of Hobart.

== History ==
Clarendon Vale was gazetted as a locality in 1977.

Like nearby Rokeby, it was originally a public housing area in the 1970s; however, like the trend in many public housing areas in Hobart, much of the public housing stock has been sold to private owners.

== Geography ==
Clarence Plains Rivulet forms the south-western boundary.

== Road infrastructure ==
Route B33 (Rokeby Road / South Arm Road) passes to the south-west. From there, Mockridge Road provides access to the locality.
