= Rokeby, Tasmania =

Rokeby
- Suburb
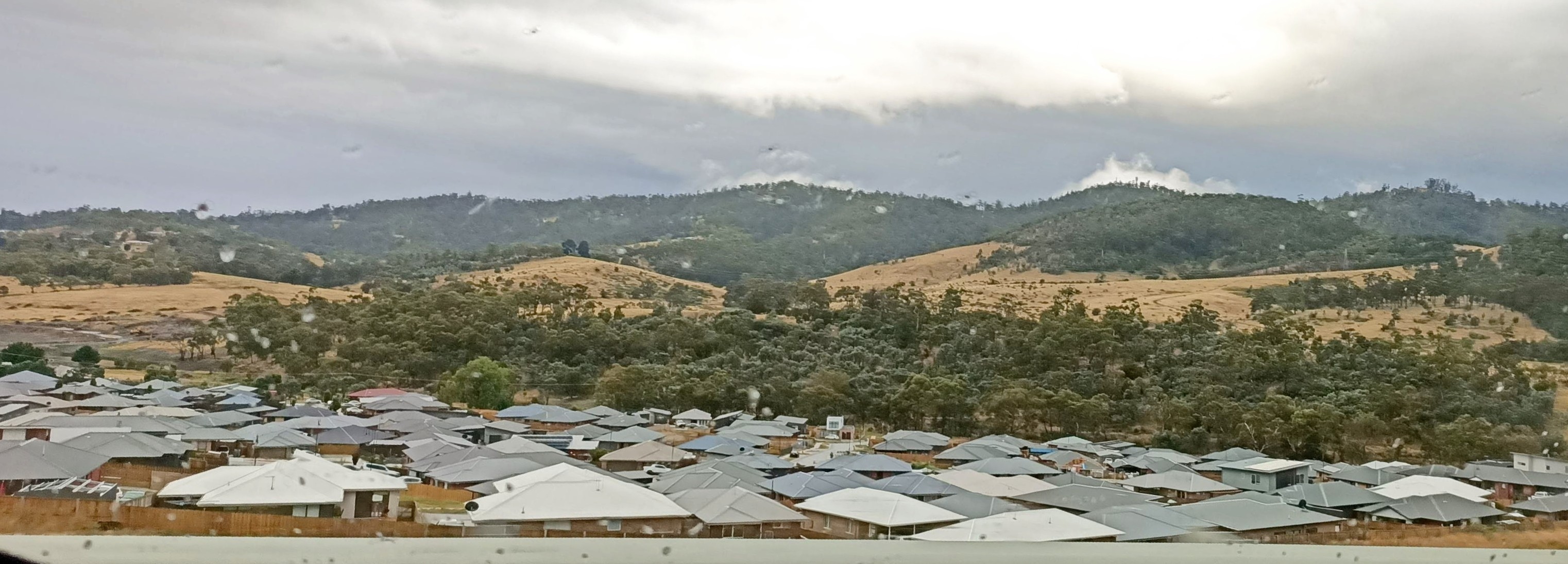
- Towards Glebe Hill from Rokeby Road

- Interactive map of Rokeby
- Coordinates: 42°53′38″S 147°25′52″E
- Country: Australia
- State: Tasmania
- City: Hobart
- LGA: City of Clarence

Government
  - Federal division: Franklin

Population
  - Total: 4,211 (SAL 2021)
- Postcode: 7019
Suburbs around Rokeby
Howrah	Mount Rumney	Clarendon Vale
Howrah	Rokeby	Oakdowns
Tranmere	Ralphs Bay	Ralphs Bay

Rokeby is a suburb of Hobart, capital of Tasmania, Australia on the eastern shore of the River Derwent. It is part of the City of Clarence local government area.

== History ==
Rokeby started as Rokeby House, a farmhouse in the area then known as Clarence Plains, in the 19th century and along with the nearby suburb of Clarendon Vale was developed into a mainly public-housing suburb of Hobart in the 1970s. It was modelled after public housing projects that took place in the United States in the 1950s.

Clarence Plains Post Office opened on 20 November 1850 and was renamed Rokeby in 1882.

== Today ==
Rokeby has a historic church, with a traditional British picket-fence cricket ground and the Rokeby Historic Trail. It has a skate park that was built around 2001 and attracted national and international professional skateboarders in a competition held there in January 2009, with $50,000 prize money on offer. Rokeby is also home to the Tasmania Police Academy, a training academy for recruits of Tasmania Police.
