= Rigali =

Rigali is an Italian surname. It appears to have originated in the vicinity of Barga.

== People ==
Notable people include:

- Alfred L. Rigali, American stage manager, managed the stage for the original production of Sex
- Donald J. Rigali, American consultant to the Columbia Accident Investigation Board
- Elia Rigali, recipient of Australia's Bravery Medal
- John E. Rigali, Italian-American sculptor, businessman and inventor
- John J. Rigali, American one-time Massachusetts State Deputy of the Knights of Columbus
- Justin Francis Rigali, American cardinal of the Roman Catholic Church
- Norbert J. Rigali, American priest of the Roman Catholic Church, member of the Society of Jesus, contributor to America
- Sandra Rigali, Italian printmaking artist, former student of Swietlan Kraczyna
- Sébastien Rigali, Belgian microbiologist and molecular biologist (researcher of the genus Streptomyces, particularly including Streptomyces lunaelactis)

== Places ==
- A Rigali, a village near Barga, Lucca, Tuscany, Italy
- Rigali, a frazione of Gualdo Tadino, Perugia, Umbria, Italy
