= Ferroverdin =

Green pigment produced in the mycelium of Streptomyces

Ferroverdin refers to three different coordination compounds that were first isolated in 1955 by Chain, Tonolo, and Carilli. It consists of three p-vinylphenyl-3-nitroso-4-hydroxybenzoate ligands complexed with a ferrous ion. Ferroverdin is a green pigment produced in the mycelium of species of Streptomyces. It is claimed to be the “first stable ferrous compound to be found in nature.” There are three types of ferroverdin: A, B, and C. In ferroverdin A, both R groups are hydrogens. In ferroverdin B, R_{1} is a hydroxyl group (OH) and R_{2} is a hydrogen (according to a diagram in the paper, the R-groups are on the vinyl group, on the carbon opposite the phenyl; they are respectively trans and cis relative to the phenyl group). In ferroverdin C, R_{1} is a hydrogen while R_{2} is a carboxyl group (COOH). Ferroverdin is immune to chelating and oxidizing agents due to the strong interaction between the ligands and ferrous ion. However, it can be broken down by reductive processes.1 The presence of ferroverdin peaks when there are four to eight μg/mL of Fe^{2+} in the media usually in the form of a salt.

== Biological role ==
Ferroverdin has no antimicrobial or insecticidal activity, and may in fact be a siderophore. Siderophores are responsible for transporting iron (usually as Fe^{3+}) from the medium into the cell to meet the metabolic needs of the organism. The significance of ferroverdin in the transfer pathway of iron remains unknown. Ferroverdin A, B, and C have also been found to inhibit cholesteryl ester transfer protein (CETP) which contributes to high blood pressure in humans.

== Structure ==
The nitrosophenolate chelating group in the three ferroverdins is unusual. Simple synthetic analogues have been made containing 2-nitrosophenol itself. These complexes adopt a facial geometry owing to the binding of alkali metals to the three oxygen centers. Natural ferroverdin has thermodynamic specificity for fac geometry where the ligands have cis arrangements around the bivalent iron atom in low spin. The geometry was determined by ^{1}H NMR which showed the same peak for the three ligands. Even though mer geometry is more sterically favorable, ferroverdin has fac geometry theoretically due to better π stabilization in its d^{6} orbitals, but further research is being done to provide evidence.

== See also ==
- Streptomyces lunaelactis – Species of actinobacteria isolated from moonmilk and producing ferroverdin A
