= List of recipients of the Bravery Medal (Australia) =

Details of Australia's Bravery Medal recipients and how to nominate for it are available on the "Itsanhonour" Web site

== Citation lists ==
	March	August
2007		
2008		
2009		
2010		
2011		
2012		
2013		
2014		
2015		
2016		

== List ==
=== 1976 ===
Recipient	Notability	Reference
Royse Rowe Davies	Warning the engine crew of the SS Lake Illawarra of danger during the Tasman Bridge disaster	
Graham Kemp	Stayed on the SS Lake Illawarra after it struck the Tasman Bridge	

=== 1977 ===
Recipient	Notability	Reference
Gary Thomas Burns	Rescued elderly women from burning flats	
Reginald Charles Hansen	Encouraged companions during 10-hour swim to safety	
Robert Angus McLeod	Assisted others on HMAS Arrow when it was being sunk by Cyclone Tracy	
Harry Bernhardt Overheu	Tackled armed robbers during a bank robbery	

=== 1978 ===
Recipient	Notability	Reference
Kenneth William Beazley	Rescued 3 men following boating accident	
Robert Lynton Burrage	Rescued woman from flooded creek	
Ian John Carrol	Nowra Naval Air Station fire	
Phillip John Edwards	For actions after crash of RAAF helicopter in Indonesia	
Mark Allen Forrest	Assisted man who was killed in street fight	
John Donald Albert Harrison	Removed source of electricity after high-voltage accident	
John Tony Thomas Henjack	Attempted to rescue woman from flooded creek	
Alwyne Grant Hill	Rescued a woman from floodwaters	
Craig Anthony Hilton	For rescuing a man from a burning vehicle	
Graham Charles (Gus) MacDonald	Rescued 3 men following boating accident	
Danny John Morrison	Rescued child from a burning house	
William John Newton	For actions during the Nowra Naval Air Station fire	
Nikola Nikolic	Rescued two persons from bad air in mine shaft	
Robert Leslie Perrot	Attempted to rescue a woman from a flooded creek	
Daniel Francis Cotter Primmer	Attempted to rescue a woman from flooded creek	
Keith Richardson	Rescued a man from the sea	
Ronald Maplemore Scott	Rescued 3 men following boating accident	
Malcolm Coubrough Shanks	Rescued boy from surf	
Graeme Clement Sheen	Rescued 4 month old child from burning house	
Keith Trevor Thomas	Rescued girl from surf	
Glen Neil Thurgate	Rescued man from burning house	

=== 1979 ===
Recipient	Notability	Reference
Alan James Anderson	Assisted in rescue after capsize of 'Belinda II' off Yamba	
Jack Beecroft	Assisted in the apprehension of an armed bank robber	
Ronald Peter Busch	Assisted in rescue after capsize of 'Sea Dreamer' off Yamba	
Thomas Cicolini	Followed and apprehended offender after bank hold-up	
Jean-Baptiste Conri	Rescued persons from bus submerged in river in New Caledonia	
John David Duncan	Pursued man after hotel hold-up	
Richard Anthony Lamb	Rescued mentally disturbed man from Sydney Harbour Bridge	
Ann Louise Martin	Rescued people in partly submerged bus	
Kevin Edward Sloane	Fought a fire in a crashed Mirage aircraft at RAAF East Sale	
Daryl John Streets	Rescued a woman from the top of a crane jib	
Gary John Wilton	Returned to burning gasworks to prevent an explosion	

== List ==
ID	Awardee	Date granted	State	Suburb	Citation	Ref
1153484	ABBOTT, Katie	17 March 2016	NSW	Bruah		
1044194	ABERNETHY, Duncan Robert	11 August 2003	NSW	New South Wales Police		
865507	ABLETT, Craig William	1 November 1990	WA	Lesmurdie	Rescue from burning car at Lesmurdie	
1143294	ABOUCHROUCHE, Daniel	16 August 2010			On the night of 15 June 2008, Mr Abouchrouche intervened to prevent an armed robbery at a supermarket at Annandale	
1134502	ABOUZEID, Marwenn Joseph	12 March 2007	NSW	Greenacre		
865522	ACKLAND, Jeffrey Brian	7 May 1992	Vic	North Bendigo	For acts of bravery in hazardous circumstances	
865755	ACKROYD, Arthur	15 February 1980	NSW		Rescued mentally disturbed man from the Sydney Harbour Bridge	
865457	ACREMAN, Keith Arnold	12 April 1994	Qld	Chermside	Disarmed bank robber at Stafford Heights	
865382	ADAMS, Alastar Oliver	11 October 1995	ACT	Canberra	Rescued distraught man from land-mine field in Cambodia	
865364	ADAMS, Peter John Douglas	12 April 1994	SA	St Agnes	Disarmed youth at Banksia Park High School	
1056678	AGIUS, Arron Joel	8 March 2004	NSW	Oakdale	In the early hours of 18 January 2003, Mr Agius rescued a man from a burning car after it crashed in Oakdale.	
1153485	AGNOLETTO, Sandro Luigi	17 March 2016	Vic	Bendigo		
1152536	AKKAN, Mustafa Ruhi	19 August 2015	NSW	Sydney		
865508	ALABACUS, Leonard Edward	1 November 1990	Vic	Werribee	Rescue of driver from burning car, Mount Gambier	
865691	ALDERTON, Allen Gregory	7 August 1981	NSW	Merrylands	Lifted heavy man from path of oncoming train at Homebush railway station	
865371	ALDRIDGE, Arthur William	27 October 1992	NSW	Old Bar	For acts of bravery in hazardous circumstances March 1993	
865498	ALEXANDER, Adrian	12 June 1987	NSW	Surry Hills	For acts of bravery in hazardous circumstances	
1151616	ALEXANDER-KEW, Margaret	30 March 2015	WA	Como		
865582	ALLEN, Leonard Joseph Matheson	3 May 1990	Vic	Hawthorn		
1150543	ALLEN, Shane James	18 August 2014	ACT	Calwell		
865370	ALONE, Isileli Takau	27 October 1992	NSW	Seven Hills	Disarmed and apprehended offender at Seven Hills Mall	
1134503	AL-SABBAGH, George Michael	12 March 2007	Vic	Williamstown		
1134504	AL-SABBAGH, Mike	12 March 2007	Vic	Newport		
1144822	ANDERSON, Clinton Philip	22 August 2011	Vic	Mitcham		
865444	ANDERSON, Graham Douglas	5 April 1995	NSW	West Wyalong	Rescue of woman from burning vehicle at Albury	
865365	ANDERSON, John William	11 October 1995	Qld	Roma	Attempted to save man from railway line east of Roma	
1144823	ANDERSON, Melissa Louise	22 August 2011	Qld			
1059264	ANDERSON, Peter Leslie	29 August 2005				
865454	ANDERSON, Richard Gordon	12 October 1994	Qld	Gin Gin	Rescue of 2 people from burning car at Wallaville	
1041230	ANDERSON, Timothy James	12 August 2002	Vic	Beaconsfield Upper		
1151617	ANDERSON-BARR, Peter John	30 March 2015	Qld		Queensland Police	
1144117	ANDREN, David Paul	21 March 2011	NSW	Sawtell	On the night of 24 September 2009, Mr Andren saved a number of people following the capsizing of a three-storey cruising vessel at Halong Bay, North Vietnam.	
1057462	ANDREW, Brett Douglas	12 August 2004	Vic	Eltham		
1058363	ANDREW, Laurence Alan	21 February 2005				
865620	ANDREW, Neville John	14 October 1983	Qld	Coominya	Rescued two persons from burning car after accident	
865406	ANDRIGHETTO, Steven	10 April 1996	Vic	Wonthaggi	Rescued youth from knife attack at Wonthaggi	
865838	ANSFIELD, Leonard Roy	10 February 1984	Vic	Watsonia	Rescued two persons from prison fire	
1142421	ANTONOFF, Ian Ross	15 March 2010	Vic	Horsham	On the night of 18 May 2008, Mr Antonoff rescued a man from a burning house at Horsham.	
1140507	AQUINO, Editha	2 March 2009	Vic		On the morning of 18 June 2007, Mrs Aquino went to the assistance of a woman being attacked in Melbourne.	
1143295	ARKLEY, Ian Robert	16 August 2010	NSW	Ashfield	On the morning of 25 April 2009, Mr Arkley rescued people from a burning house at Chippendale.	
865586	ASCRIZZI, Connie	3 May 1990	SA	Newton	(Posthumous award). Bravery Medal 19 September 1990. Late of Newtown	
865573	ASHCROFT, Darren Stephen	12 June 1987	Vic	Yarra Glen	Assisted in apprehending man after murder at a shopping centre	
865746	ASHE, Allan John	28 April 1989	NSW		Disarmed offender after car chase	
1153486	ASHMAN, Luke William	17 March 2016	SA	Brighton		
1135374	ASTASY, Sherif	14 February 2000	NSW	Late of Macquarie Fields		
1139395	AUBECK, Tony Paul	25 August 2008	NSW	Quirindi	On the night of 18 November 2006, Mr Aubeck intervened during an armed hold up at Murrurundi.	
1131044	AVERY, Jack Daniel	18 September 2006	Vic	Newport		
1135445	AVERY, Ronnie Francis	21 August 2000	NSW	Ramornie		
1135640	AVERY, Stuart Charles	6 August 2001				
1146489	AYRES, Anthony Robert	19 March 2012	Qld	Buderim		
1135375	BAGLEY, Symon Paul	14 February 2000	WA	Northampton		
865461	BAGNARA, John Peter Daniel	12 April 1994	ACT	Curtin	Rescue of youth from flooded stormwater drain near Woden	
1146490	BAIADA, Benjamin	19 March 2012	NSW			
1135686	BAIGRIE, Timothy Gordon	20 August 2007				
1138338	Bailey, Peter Bruce	17 March 2008	NSW			
865312	BAILEY, William Joseph	30 January 1987	ACT	Isabella Plains	Bravery Medal. 5 June 1987	
	BAKER, Anthony Gavin	18 August 2014				
1144118	BAKER, Sherle-Lee Gordeen	21 March 2011	NSW	Late of Dubbo	On the early evening of 14 January 2009, Mrs Baker attempted the rescue of a teenage girl at Butlers Falls, Dubbo.	
865412	BALD, Christopher Kevin	10 April 1996	SA	Kangaroo Island	Rescue of man from sea at Remarkable Rocks, Kangaroo Island	
865310	BALDWIN, Brian Roy	9 August 1985	NSW	Bidwill	Rescued children from burning house	
	BALDWIN, Lucas	17 March 2016				
865344	BALLANTYNE, John	15 October 1997	Vic	Port Melbourne	For acts of bravery in hazardous circumstances. BM S45 1998	
865761	BANKS, Keith James	12 October 1994	Qld		Disarmed offender occupying the MLC Building in Brisbane	
865513	BARBER, Alan Leonard	1 November 1990	Qld	Carina	Attempted rescue from armed offender at Carina	
	BARBER, Leanne Gayle	24 March 2014				
1058364	BARBER, Rodney Warren	21 February 2005				
865332	BARNES, Anthony Robert	1 October 1998	Vic	Romsey	For acts of bravery in hazardous circumstances. BM S78 1999	
1134505	BARNETT, Andrew Peter	12 March 2007	Vic	Hamlyn Heights		
1134506	BARNETT, Graeme Frederick	12 March 2007	Vic	Grovedale		
1134507	BARNETT, Karen Anne	12 March 2007	Vic	Grovedale		
	BARNEWALL, Murray Charles	19 August 2015				
865807	BARR, David Hill	18 April 1991	SA		Apprehended armed offender at Salisbury Interchange	
865494	BARRETT, David Charles	5 September 1988	Qld	Bowen	Rescued man from charging bull	
865744	BARRETT, Philip John	30 October 1996	Tas		Siege at Willow Lane, Prospect Vale	
865417	BARROW, Brett Allan	12 October 1994	Vic	Yallourn	Disarmed a violent and alcohol affected man at a Hotel	
865514	BARROWS, William James	1 November 1990	SA	Mount Gambier	Rescue of driver from burning car, Mt Gambier	
865767	BARTHOLOMAEUS, Brian Rex	18 April 1991	SA		Fire on live sheep carrier Mukairish Alsades	
865375	BASSETT, Dennis Mervyn	14 April 1993	WA	Kalgoorlie	Disarmed offender in the Kalgoorlie/Boulder City Council Building	
1042948	BAST, Ferdinand Marinus	3 March 2003	Qld	Townsville	Gave his life preventing a robbery.	
865431	BATEMAN, Keith Paul	19 May 1999			Attempted rescue of 2 people from electrocution by cables	
2002263	BATEMAN, Justin John	24 July 2018			Australian Federal Police Specialist Response Group diver displayed considerable bravery in the search and rescue of 12 young boys and their soccer coach from a flooded cave in the Tham Luang cave system in Northern Thailand.	
	BATEMAN, Timothy Michael	18 August 2014				
1139396	BATSON, Victor Douglas	25 August 2008	Vic	Hastings	On the night of 7 April 2007, Mr Batson helped rescue a driver from a burning vehicle at Hastings, Victoria.	
1143296	BATTERSBY, Richard Montague	16 August 2010				
1041218	Beament, Julia Elizabeth	18 February 2002	NT	Douglas Daly		
865427	BEATS, Shane Joseph	12 October 1994	Vic	Horsham	Rescued injured woman from burning car at Armstrong	
865247	BEAVIS, Lynn Suzanne	9 April 1997	Vic	Mount Evelyn	Shooting incident at Port Arthur	
1042949	BECKMANS, Hendrikus Antonius	3 March 2003	Vic	Kangaroo Flat		
1042907	BECKMANS, Mary-Ann	3 March 2003	Vic	Kangaroo Flat		
865756	BELBIN, John	7 May 1992	Tas		Tasmania Police Force	
865634	BELGRADE, Robert William	12 June 1987	SA	Rostrevor	Tackled armed offender after stabbing	
1135376	BENNETT, Stephen Noel	14 February 2000	Vic	Mount Martha		
1058365	BENNETT, William George	21 February 2005				
1142422	BERRYMAN, Douglas Roy	15 March 2010	NSW	Gol Gol	On the afternoon of 30 July 2004, Mr Berryman rescued a man from a burning car wreck at Gol Gol, New South Wales.	
1058366	BESTER, Nicholas Neal	21 February 2005				
1146569	BEVEN, Kevin Allan	27 August 2012	Qld	Weipa		
1144824	BEWLEY, Tony Wayne	22 August 2011	NSW	Ulladulla		
1135446	BICKLE, Graham Martin	21 August 2000	Qld	North Booval		
1056679	BIELSKI, Monika Beata	8 March 2004	Qld	Mount Sheridan	On the afternoon of 20 October 2002, Ms Bielski helped to rescue a young child who had been stabbed by a man in Cairns	
1135641	BILSBOROUGH, Kerry Lee	6 August 2001	WA	Alfred Cove		
	BISSELL, Zachary John	17 August 2016				
865687	BITAR, Fadi Mohamed	30 October 1991	NSW	Fairfield	Rescue of elderly woman from burning house at Cabramatta	
1057463	BITTERMANN, Ludwig Anton	12 August 2004	ACT	Latham		
	BJARNESEN, Benjamin Douglas	19 August 2015			Queensland Police	
1057464	BLAKE, Daniel Alan	12 August 2004	Qld	Cairns North		
865506	BLANCH, Gary William	18 April 1991	WA	Ashfield	Disarmed an offender at the Ashfield Tavern at Ashfield.	
865276	BLEWITT, Michelle Maree	19 May 1999	NSW	Goulburn	Rescue during the 1998 Sydney to Hobart Yacht Race	
1146491	BLICK, Lisa Joy	19 March 2012	Vic			
1144825	BLYTHE, Connor James	22 August 2011	Vic	Beaufort		
1059265	BOAST, Alastair John	29 August 2005				
1057465	BOBETIC, Ivan	12 August 2004	Vic			
865349	BODE, Mark Andrew	9 April 1997	Qld	Gladstone	For acts of bravery in hazardous circumstances. BM S374 1997	
	BODSWORTH, James Ronald	18 August 2014				
2002260	BOERS, Kelly Craig	24 July 2018			Australian Federal Police Specialist Response Group diver displayed considerable bravery in the search and rescue of 12 young boys and their soccer coach from a flooded cave in the Tham Luang cave system in Northern Thailand.	
865264	BOLZON, Maria	1 October 1998			For acts of bravery in hazardous circumstances. BM S78 1999	
865817	BONE, Neville Maurice	26 November 1982	SA		SA Police Force	
1057466	BONNEY, Derek Neil	12 August 2004	WA	Kalgoorlie		
865766	BOOTH, Garry Lee	28 April 1989	NSW		Disarmed offender	
865635	BOTTFIELD, Ernest Alfred	12 June 1987	SA	Iron Knob	Rescued neighbour from burning house	
	BOWSER, Peter John	17 August 2016				
865399	BOYD, Michael James	10 April 1996	Qld	West Ipswich	Pursued armed robber at Ipswich	
865612	BOYD, Peter Douglas	25 June 1982	SA	Henley Beach	Rescued man after boating accident	
865493	BRADY, Craig	5 September 1988	Tas	West Moonah		
865229	BREDL, Josef	19 May 1999	Qld	Airlie Beach	Rescue from a crocodile attack at a wildlife park	
865542	BREENE, Jonathan Joseph	1 November 1990	Qld	Hamilton	Rescue from well at Mitchell	
865253	BRIAN, Nathan David	29 April 1998	Qld	Currumbin Waters	For acts of bravery in hazardous circumstances. BM S287 1998	
1148524	BRIESE, Dean Francis	1 September 2013	NT	Berrimah		
1143297	BRIGGS, Michael Bruce	16 August 2010	NSW	West Tamworth		
865254	BRIODY, Jamie Peter	30 October 1996	NSW	Woy Woy		
1042908	BRISCOE, Robert Lachlan	3 March 2003	WA	Albany		
1143298	BROCK, Gordon	16 August 2010	NSW	Newee Creek	On the night of 3 June 2008, Mr Brock rescued a woman from a submerged vehicle at Newee Creek, Nambucca Heads.	
	BROMFIELD, Ricky Lee	17 March 2016				
865553	BROOKS, Garry Edward	26 October 1989	WA	Telfer	Rescue from Lancefield Gold Mine after rock fall at Laverton	
865500	BROOKS, Shannon Peter	28 April 1989	SA	Salisbury	Attempted rescue from stormwater drain	
1044195	BROSNAN, Jason Anthony	11 August 2003	Qld	Queensland Police		
1134508	BROWN, Adrian James	12 March 2007	Tas	Late of Scottsdale		
1135447	BROWN, Alan Robert	21 August 2000	Qld	Beenleigh		
865593	BROWN, Jane Edith	11 October 1995	NSW	Sydney	Rescued woman under attack at Hornsby railway station	
865786	BROWN, Kevin Neil	26 October 1993	SA			
1142423	BROWN, Robert George	15 March 2010	ACT		During the early evening of 18 November 2008, Mr Brown attempted the rescue of a fifteen-month-old child in waters surrounding Tathra Wharf.	
1138340	Brown, Timothy James	17 March 2008	NSW			
1135448	BROWN, Timothy John	21 August 2000	NSW	Mudgee		
1135642	BROWNING, Neville John	6 August 2001	Tas	Brighton		
1058367	BRUCE, Uthmaan	21 February 2005				
1147512	BRUCKNER, Raymond	25 March 2013	Qld	Lowood		
865354	BRUN, John Alex	10 April 1996	NSW	Randwick	Rescue of man from burning building at Randwick	
1135377	BRYANT, Jason William	14 February 2000	NSW	Port Macquarie	Port Macquarie Police Station, Hay Street,	
865372	BUCKLEY, Gail	26 October 1993	WA	Kenwick	Attempted rescue of woman attacked by knife bearing husband	
865499	BULLIVANT, James Muir	1 November 1990	Qld	Wavell Heights	Interception of armed offenders at Wavell Hill Post Office	
865633	BUNKER, Geoffrey Roland	31 January 1987			Attempted to rescue woman from self-inflicted fire	
1056680	BURCH, Peter Kenneth	8 March 2004	Vic	South Yarra	On the evening of 27 August 2002, Mr Burch rescued several people from a woman wielding a knife in central Melbourne.	
1148525	BURGESS, Daniel John	1 September 2013			Victoria Police	
865414	BURKE, Angela Leigh	27 October 1992	Qld	Sunnybank	BM/For acts of bravery in hazardous circumstances MAR 1993	
865733	BURKE, John William	11 April 1980			Apprehended Ananda Marga terrorists with bomb at Bass Hill	
865345	BURKE, Tony	15 October 1997	NSW	Queanbeyan	For acts of bravery in hazardous circumstances. BM S45 1998	
865823	BURROWS, John Bagnall	11 April 1980			Aircraft hijack attempt at Sydney Airport	
865579	BURROWS, Paul Howard	5 September 1988	Vic	Clayton South	Attempted rescue of child from burning building	
865791	BURTON, Joshua Anthony	5 April 1995	NSW		Apprehended 2 armed offenders at Ingleburn	
865296	BURTON, Roy Philip	5 September 1988	WA	Broomehill	Rescued girl from house fire	
865416	BUTLER, Mark John	12 April 1994	Qld	Enoggera	Disarmed bank robber at Stafford Heights	
1148526	BUTLER, Scott Nicholas	1 September 2013	NSW	Yamba		
865792	BYERS, John Andrew	28 April 1989	NSW		Disarmed offender after car chase	
1041231	CABRERA, Antonio Beltran	12 August 2002	NSW	Frenchs Forest		
865530	CAINE, Douglas Gordan	27 October 1992	WA	Belmont	Attempted to rescue a youth from a well at Walliston	
1129389	CAINES, Philip Geoffrey	27 February 2006	WA	Mandurah		
1142424	CAIRNEY, Sandra	15 March 2010	NSW	Holmesville	On the morning of 10 January 2007, Ms Cairney rescued her brother who was attacked by an armed intruder at his home at Holmesville, New South Wales.	
865400	CAIRNS, Ronald David	10 April 1996	Qld	Burleigh Heads	Rescue from armed offender at North Palm Beach	
865325	CAMPBELL, Byron Joel	29 April 1998	Qld		Rescue of 5-year-old boy from a flooded river	
	CAMPBELL, Darryl Roderick	24 March 2014				
1135449	CAMPBELL, Matthew Kane	21 August 2000			New South Wales Police Force	
865793	CAMPBELL, Neil William John	12 June 1987	NSW		For acts of bravery in hazardous circumstances NEW SOUTH WALES. C OF A GAZETTE NO S 281 21 October 1987	
1058368	CAMPBELL, Philip Arthur	21 February 2005				
865558	CAMPBELL, Travis Robert George	26 October 1989	NSW	Eungella	Rescue of 2 boys from Oxley River at Eungella	
1058369	CAMPBELL-THOMSON, Simon Paul	21 February 2005				
	CANTWELL, Anne Doreen	30 March 2015				
1129390	CAREW, Joshua Ryan	27 February 2006	NSW	Doyalson		
865516	CARMODY, David John	18 April 1991	NSW	Dulwich Hill	Rescued man from burning car at Dulwich Hill	
1059267	CARNE, Martyn Andrew	29 August 2005				
	CARROLL, Benjamin Luke	18 August 2014				
865590	CARROLL, Eric Mainman	6 November 1987	NSW	East Lindfield	Tackled armed robbers during hold-up	
865246	CARROLL, Kevin Geoffery	26 October 1989	NSW	Woolgoolga	Rescue of woman from surf at Emerald Beach, Coffs Harbour	
865787	CARROLL, Phillip John	19 May 1999	Vic	Carrum Downs	Fire in the engine room of HMAS Westralia	
865729	CARSON, Brian Peter	12 September 1980	NSW	Faulconbridge	Displayed considerable bravery in resCuing an injured person from the path of a fast-moving train after a car accident	
865776	CARTER, Mark Braden	12 April 1994	Tas		Attempted rescue of man from disused mine near Beaconsfield	
1146492	CARTER, Michael Hastings	19 March 2012	NSW	Nyngan		
865458	CASEY, John Ronald	12 October 1994	Vic	Springvale	Rescued woman being attacked by her mentally disturbed son	
865465	CATO, Randolph LeManuel	5 April 1995	Tas	Hobart	Apprehension of robber armed with syringe allegedly AIDS inf	
1042909	CAVUILATI, Orisi Naulumatua	3 March 2003	NSW	Belmore		
865789	CHADWICK, Brian Thomas	5 September 1988	Vic	Westernport		
865560	CHAPMAN, Damien John	26 October 1989	Vic	Hampton Park	Rescue from disused well at Hampton Park	
865752	CHASE, Claude William	27 July 1984	Qld	Charters Towers	Moved person from vehicle suspected of containing bomb	
865538	CHEE, Catherine Ann	1 November 1990	Qld	Southport	Interception of armed offender in Caravan Park at Southport	
1059268	CHESTER, Joel William	29 August 2005				
	CHIHA, Malak	17 August 2016				
	CHIHA, Youcef	17 August 2016				
1140508	CHILLEMI, Michael John	2 March 2009	NSW	Malua Bay	On 5 January 2005, Mr Chillemi helped rescue the driver from a burning vehicle at Telegraph Point.	
1057467	CHRISTOFILAKIS, John	12 August 2004	Vic	Nunawading		
1135450	CHURNIN, Brett	21 August 2000	NSW	Bondi Beach		
865818	CIBULKA, Paul Daniel	29 April 1998	NSW		Pursued armed robbers at Maroubra	
865564	CLARIDGE, Donald James	26 October 1989	Tas	Rokeby	Rescue from house fire near Hobart	
1042910	CLARK, Phillip Leslie	3 March 2003	NSW	Sefton		
865638	CLARKE, Brenton	12 June 1987	SA	Campbelltown	Assisted in rescue of 5 yr old boy from burning house	
	CLARKE, Elissa Marie	19 August 2015				
1058370	CLARKE, Geoffrey	21 February 2005				
1134510	CLEARY, James Andrew	12 March 2007	NSW	Picton		
	CLOAKE, Darren John	24 March 2014				
1144826	COHRS, Allan Karl	22 August 2011	Qld			
865828	COKER, Raymond Michael	12 April 1994	Qld	Stafford	Rescued busdriver from armed prison escapee at Brisbane	
1134511	COLEMAN, Luke Raymond	12 March 2007	NSW	Lake Cathie		
1146570	COLEMAN, Peter Graham	27 August 2012	Qld			
1140509	COLLINS, Phillip John	2 March 2009	NSW			
	CONDON, Michael James	19 August 2015	Qld		Queensland Police	
865812	CONNELLY, Grant Maurice	28 April 1989	NSW		Rescue from armed offenders	
865514	CONNERS, Quentin David	30 July 2014	NSW		For acts of bravery in hazardous circumstances.	
865433	CONRAD, Michael Walter	1 October 1998	Qld	Bli Bli	For acts of bravery in hazardous circumstances. BM S78 1999	
865749	COOK, Kimbal Manning	29 January 1982	NSW		NSW POLICE FORCE. Bravery Medal 8 April 1982. ON 7 July 1980 AT CREMORNE NSW DETECTIVE COOK DISPLAYED CONSIDERABLE BRAVERY WHEN HE AND OTHER POLICE PURSUED AND APPREHENDED AN ARMED AND DANGEROUS MAN WHO WAS FIRING AT POLICE	
865504	COOPER, Eric Gordon	5 September 1988	Tas	Kingston		
1139397	COOPER, Richard Anthony	25 August 2008	NSW	Ashbury	During the night of 23 October 2003, Mr Cooper rescued passengers from a burning vehicle at Mascot, New South Wales.	
1135451	COOPER, Scott Raymond	21 August 2000	WA	Esperance		
1042912	CORDON, Jason William	3 March 2003	WA	Albany		
865648	CORLETT, Leonard Edward	27 July 1984	WA	Wiluna	Released pilot from wreckage of plane after crash	
865351	COSSINS, Stephen John	26 October 1993	Tas	Weymouth	Rescue of girl from surf at Weymouth	
865294	COSTELLO, Edward Dennis	12 June 1987	SA	Wanbi	Rescued three persons from cellar filled with CO2 gas.	
	COSTELLO, Nicholas Hugh	30 March 2015				
	COSTER, Ashley Ryan	19 August 2015				
	COSTER, Timothy Shaun	19 August 2015				
1057468	COTTEE, Stephen Malcolm	12 August 2004	Qld	North Maclean		
1135643	COUGHLAN, Martin Joseph	6 August 2001	WA	Sorrento		
865662	COULTON, Merril Elizabeth	11 April 1980	NSW	Roseville	Stood up to bandits in TAB hold-up	
1142425	COUSINS, Robert John	15 March 2010	NSW	East Maitland	In the early hours of the morning of 23 May 1996, Mr Cousins (then Senior Constable) took action at the site of a burning and exploding motor vehicle at Rankin Park.	
865390	COWAN, Arthur William	30 January 1987	ACT	Canberra	OFFICE OF THE CHIEF OF THE GENERAL STAFF	
865670	COWAN, Robert Leslie	30 October 1991	Qld	Gogango	BM/Australian bravery decorations May 92. For acts of bravery in hazardous circumstances	
1058371	COYNE, Kelly-Maree	21 February 2005				
2002261	COX, Benjamin Walter	24 July 2018			Australian Federal Police Specialist Response Group diver displayed considerable bravery in the search and rescue of 12 young boys and their soccer coach from a flooded cave in the Tham Luang cave system in Northern Thailand.	
1059269	CRAMP, Rachel Ann	29 August 2005				
	CRAVEN, Thomas Charles	17 August 2016				
1139398	CRAWFORD, David James	25 August 2008	NSW		During the afternoon of 2 October 2006, Constable Crawford rescued a man from a burning vehicle at Padstow Heights.	
865718	CREASER, Raymond Arthur	30 January 1987	Qld	Moorooka	Subdue armed man	
865421	CRICHTON, John Hugh	12 October 1994	NSW	Wombat	Rescued the driver from a burning truck at Wombat	
865639	CROOK, Clinton Shane	6 November 1987	NSW	Wagga Wagga	Rescued woman and attempted to rescue 2 children from car	
865248	CROSSWELL, Peter David	9 April 1997	Tas	Seven Mile Beach	For acts of bravery in hazardous circumstances. BM S374 1997	
1135687	CROW, Russell Norman	20 August 2007	Vic	Middle Park		
865768	CROWLEY, John Clement	14 April 1993	NSW			
865836	CUMERFORD, David Mark	5 September 1988	Qld	Camp Hill	Disarmed a mentally disturbed woman	
865591	CUPPER, Ross Gordon	3 May 1990	WA	Nedlands		
1135688	CURLL, Roland	20 August 2007				
	CURRAN, Michael William	17 March 2016				
865722	CURRY, Kevin	11 March 1983	NSW		NSW POLICE FORCE ATTEMPTING TO DISARM A MAN WHO WAS THREATENING A TAXI DRIVER	
	CUTBUSH, Rowan Anthony	24 March 2014				
865683	CUTHBERT, Joanne Louise	18 April 1991	Tas	Margate	Attempted rescue from drowning at Mystery Creek Cave	
1135689	DALEY, Laura Megan	20 August 2007	Qld	Brisbane		
1135378	DANG, Thai-Quoc	14 February 2000	NSW	Late of Fairfield Heights	December 1998 Entered the water on multiple occasions to rescue kids caught in a rip at Sandbar Beach, and after entering the water for the final time Mr Dang lost his life attempting to save another.	
1059270	DARMODY, Paul Gerald	29 August 2005				
865592	DARRAGH, Paul	3 May 1990	SA	Morphett Vale	Interception of armed offender after robbery at CBA Bank	
865562	DAVIDSON, Pamela Jane	1 November 1990	NSW	Safety Beach	Rescue after plane crash near Coffs Harbour	
865441	DAVIDSON, Peter Gordon	19 May 1999	Vic	Traralgon	BM. For acts of bravery in hazardous circumstances. GAZ S370. 23 AUG 99	
1055897	DAVIE, WilliamJeffrey Bromfield	27 December 2003	ACT	Phillip		
1146571	DAVIES, Ian Mark	27 August 2012	WA			
	DAVIES, John Edward	24 March 2014				
865637	DAVIS, Gordon Stewart	12 June 1987	NSW	Gorokan	Tackled armed man during attack on nurse in hospital	
865663	DAVIS, Howard Charles	30 January 1987	SA	Craigmore		
865576	DAVIS, Megan	3 May 1990	NSW		Rescue from cliff top at Watsons Bay	
1041232	DAVIS, Noel John	12 August 2002	NSW	McGraths Hill		
	DAVIS, Trevor Mark	18 August 2014				
865378	DAVIS, Wayne Allan	26 October 1993	NSW	Casino	Attempted rescue of child from house fire at Casino	
1135537	DAWSON, Michael Peter	12 March 2001	Qld	Cabarlah		
865795	DAWSON, Stanley Russell	12 September 1980	SA	Woodville West	Bravery Medal 10 December 1980. ON 16 March 1980, CHIEF INSPECTOR DAWSON DISPLAYED CONSIDERABLE BRAVERY BY APPROACHING A MENTALLY DERANGED MAN, WHO WAS THREATENING TO IGNITE HIS HOME AFTER DOWSING IT WITH 8 GALLONS OF PETROL, LATER EXTINGUISHING THE MATCH	
865423	DAY, Anthony Shane	19 May 1999	SA	Adelaide	Rescue from house fire at Davoren Park	
1134512	DAY, Kevin Patrick	12 March 2007			New South Wales Police	
865732	DE FEUDIS, Anthony John	14 April 1993	NSW		Rescue of two girls from burning house at Bradbury	
1147513	de LORENZO, Stephen Edward	25 March 2013	NSW	Maroubra		
1140510	DE WAARD, Paul Johannes	2 March 2009			On the morning of 18 June 2007, Mr de Waard, a visitor from the Netherlands, went to the assistance of a woman being attacked in Melbourne.	
865428	DEAN, Nicholas Leighton	19 May 1999	NSW	Rouse Hill	BM. For acts of bravery in hazardous circumstances. GAZ S370. 23 AUG 99	
865636	DENIC, Simon Michael	12 June 1987	Vic	Moorabbin	Assisted in apprehending a man after murder at shopping centre	
865475	DENNE, William George	5 September 1988	NSW	Blacktown	Attempted rescue of youth after kayak sank	
	DENNY, William Thomas	24 March 2014				
1135690	DEVANEY, Paul James	20 August 2007	NSW	Frenches Forest	Rescue of man trapped in burning car	
1056681	DEWHURST, Paul Benjamin	8 March 2004	NSW	Como West	On the morning of 2 July 2002, Mr Dewhurst rescued two teenage boys from the surf at Coledale Beach.	
865566	DIAZ, Edmond	3 May 1990	Vic	Geelong West	Rescue from cliff top at Watsons Bay	
865505	DICKINSON, Carol	27 October 1992	NSW	Greenacre		
865565	DICKSON, Laurence Andrew	1 November 1990	NSW	Smithfield	Rescue of child from house fire at Wyoming	
1042913	DIGNAN, Joseph Desmond	3 March 2003	WA	Australind		
865350	DIMITROFF, Mitko Angel	9 August 1985			Attempted to protect elderly man during bank hold-up	
1141434	DISHON, Joshua William	17 August 2009	Vic	Blackburn South	On the morning of 4 September 2008, Mr Dishon apprehended a man armed with a syringe at Box Hill, Victoria.	
1135379	DIVE, Rhys John	14 February 2000	NSW	South Penrith		
865452	DIXON, Paul Anthony	5 April 1995	WA	Bunbury	Rescued woman being attacked with a knife by her husband	
	DOLL, Michael Olaf	30 March 2015				
1135691	DONALD, Nicholas James	20 August 2007				
865826	DONNELLY, Jason	26 October 1989	NSW		Pursuit of armed offender at Woolloomooloo	
865841	DONNELLY, Mathew Marcius	6 November 1987	Qld		Queensland Police Service	
1129391	DONOVAN, James John	27 February 2006	Vic			
865357	DORLING, Edward Charles	26 October 1993	Vic	Thorpdale	Disarmed offender who was attempting to hijack a coach	
865478	DOUGLAS, David Eric	7 May 1992	Qld	Normanton		
1143299	DOVE, Natalie Cherie	16 August 2010	Qld	Burleigh Heads	On the afternoon of 16 September 2008, Miss Dove protected students from youths armed with a knife at Marymount Catholic College, Burleigh Heads.	
865724	DOWERS, Frederick John	6 November 1987	NSW	Panania		
865544	DOWLING, Grace Philomena	26 October 1989			(POSTHMUS AWARD) BM. LATE OF 36 CLARKES RD, BALLYPHEHANE, CORK, COUNTY CORK EIRE.	
1140511	DOWNIE, Richard James	2 March 2009	Qld		On the evening of 5 August 2003, Senior Sergeant Downie (then Sergeant) disarmed and apprehended a female armed with a gun at Birkdale, Queensland.	
	DOWSON, Lucas John	17 March 2016				
865681	DOYLE, John Frederick	30 October 1991	NSW	Randwick		
	DRAGE, Graham George	30 March 2015				
	DRAPER, Bradley David	24 March 2014				
1143300	DRAPER, Sachelle Rosalie	16 August 2010	WA	Wannanup	On the night of 13 October 2007, Ms Draper rescued two men from drowning at Avalon Bay, Falcon.	
865597	DRAYTON, Aubrey Ernest	3 May 1990	NSW	Toronto		
1041263	DREWRY, Leo John	12 August 2002	Vic	Cobden		
865547	DRINKWATER, Martin Joseph	26 October 1989	NSW	North Lambton	Rescue from armed offender at Hunter Hospital, Newcastle	
865467	DUNCUM, Darrell William	5 April 1995	NSW	Forster	Rescued 3 people after a boating accident at Forster	
865821	DUNHAM, Keith Graeme	1 August 1986			Disarmed dangerous man during domestic dispute	
1135452	DUNLOP, Brett Kingsley	21 August 2000	NSW	Grattai		
865410	DUNOON, Christopher Douglas	10 April 1996	Vic	Belmont	Rescue of injured tanker driver at Waurn Ponds	
865669	DUNPHY, Neale Michael	30 October 1991	Qld	Gogango	For acts of bravery in hazardous circumstances	
1135380	DUONG, Kevin-Chung	14 February 2000	NSW		Late of 11 Moonshine Avenue, Cabramatta West	
1146572	DURBIDGE, Garry Allen	27 August 2012	Vic	Hamilton		
865243	DUTTON, David Shane Decourcy	19 May 1999	ACT	Tuggeranong	Rescue during the 1998 Sydney to Hobart Yacht Race	
865764	DWIGHT, Kenneth James	10 April 1996	Vic		Rescue man from stationary bus on railway line Hoppers Crossing	
865730	DYER, Elizabeth Anne	1 November 1990	WA	Margaret River	Assisted injured youths after car accident at Margaret River	
1135381	EASTON, Paul James	14 February 2000	Qld	Toowoomba		
1142426	EASTWELL, Trevor William	15 March 2010	WA	Late of Shoalwater	During the afternoon of 18 April 2008, Mr Eastwell rescued three children from rough surf at Shoalwater.	
2002267	EATHER, Troy Matthew	24 July 2018			Royal Australian Navy Clearance Diving Branch diver displayed considerable bravery in the search and rescue of 12 young boys and their soccer coach from a flooded cave in the Tham Luang cave system in Northern Thailand.	
865495	EATHORNE, Carolyn Joy	5 September 1988	WA	Melville		
865385	EDMISTON, Eric Stephen	30 October 1991	NSW		LPG gas fire and explosions at St Peters	
1144119	EDWARDS, Lachlan John	21 March 2011	Vic	Belmont	On the evening of 7 November 2009, Mr Edwards rescued two people caught in a rip at Point Impossible Beach.	
865775	EDWARDS, Peter John	21 December 1988	Tas		TASMANIA POLICE FORCE. Bravery Medal. 21 December 1988	
1147514	EDWARDS, Samuel Julian	25 March 2013	NSW	Kiama		
1139400	EL HAOULI, Samir	25 August 2008	Vic	Thomastown		
1042914	ELCHAM, Peter Boutros	3 March 2003	Qld	Main Beach		
1135382	ELKHEIR, Samir	14 February 2000	NSW	Sydney		
1142427	ELLIOTT, Trent Charles	15 March 2010	NSW		On the afternoon of 26 January 2008, Senior Constable Elliott helped rescue a man during riots near the Rainbow Bay Surf Lifesaving Club, Rainbow Bay, Coolangatta	
1059271	ELLIS, Milton Wayne	29 August 2005				
1058372	ELSON, David Malcolm	21 February 2005				
1140512	ELVERY, Brian Leonard	2 March 2009	NSW	Gulmarrad	On the afternoon of 2 November 2006, Mr Elvery rescued a pilot and a passenger following a helicopter crash at Palmers Island.	
865799	ELVIN, Leslie Robert	26 November 1982			Assisted in apprehension of man after robbery	
865520	ELWELL, Charles	27 October 1992	Qld	Esk	For acts of bravery in hazardous circumstances	
865800	EMERSON, Edward	30 October 1996	NSW		Attempted to apprehend armed offender at Casula	
1135644	EMERSON, Lawrence John	6 August 2001	NSW	Ulladulla		
1146493	ERLANDSEN, Paul Andrew	19 March 2012	Vic	Upper Ferntree Gully		
865554	ESMOND, Gregory Charles	26 October 1989	WA	Bunbury	Rescue from a burning bus after traffic accident	
	ETTRIDGE, Anita May	17 August 2016				
865413	EVANS, Glen William	19 May 1999	NSW	Goulburn	BM. For acts of bravery in hazardous circumstances. GAZ S370. 23 AUG 99	
	EVERITT, Mark Patrick	17 August 2016				
865846	FAIRMAN, Richard Andrew	12 April 1994	NSW	West Wollongong	Attempted rescue of woman from burning house at Mt Keira	
1144827	FAKES, Sandra Jayne	22 August 2011	NSW	Tenambit		
865824	FARMER, Jeffrey Ronald	28 April 1989	NSW		Disarmed offender	
1044196	FARMER, Phillip John	11 August 2003	Qld	Brighton		
1131046	FARMER, Timothy John	18 September 2006	Qld	Cannonvale		
865483	FARRUGIA, Oswald	7 May 1992	NSW	Kyeemagh		
1134513	FAULKNER, Maxwell Lloyd	12 March 2007	WA	Manjimup		
865449	FAWCETT-POWLES, John Nigal	14 April 1993	NSW	Nambucca Heads		
1135538	FEATHERSTONE, Paul John	12 March 2001	NSW	Oyster Bay		
1148527	FENECH, Andrew Joseph	1 September 2013	Qld	Brisbane		
1148528	FERGUSON, Jamie Scott	1 September 2013	Qld	Stafford Heights		
	FERNANDO, Kasun Hasanga	18 August 2014				
865825	FERRARA, Sidney Peter	30 January 1987	NSW	RAAF Base Amberley		
865606	FERRETT, Lyal	14 October 1983	Qld	Alexandra Hills	Rescued children from burning house	
1135645	FIEFIA, Ilavalu	6 August 2001	NSW	Frenchs Forest		
1056682	FIELD, Robert Brian	8 March 2004	WA	Willetton	On the morning of 27 November 1999, Mr Field rescued a colleague from a swarm of bees in Jerdacuttup, Western Australia, disregarding his own allergy to bee stings.	
1144828	FILMER, Dean Kenneth	22 August 2011	Vic	Croydon		
	FINCH, Locke William	18 August 2014				
1142428	FIRTH, Luke	15 March 2010	WA	Karrinyup	On the morning of 25 September 2008, Mr Firth rescued passengers trapped in a helicopter which had crashed into Talbot Bay, Western Australia.	
1131047	FISHER, Lyall Mervyn	18 September 2006	Qld	Roma		
865589	FITZALAN, Peter Bruce	3 May 1990	NSW	Dubbo	Rescue of baby boy from burning caravan at Dubbo	
2002262	FITZGERALD, Matthew Peter	24 July 2018			Australian Federal Police Specialist Response Group diver displayed considerable bravery in the search and rescue of 12 young boys and their soccer coach from a flooded cave in the Tham Luang cave system in Northern Thailand.	
865556	FLAVELL, Jamie Mark	26 October 1989	Vic	Fountain Gate South	Rescue from disused well at Hampton Park	
1144829	FLEMING, Beau Douglas	22 August 2011	Vic			
865404	FLETCHER, Karl Anthony	10 April 1996	NSW	Hanwood	Assisted Police Officer under attack Pizza Hut in Griffith	
865384	FLETCHER, Kevin James	5 April 1995	NSW		Rescue of woman from burning vehicle at Albury	
1138341	Flood, Gregory John	17 March 2008	NSW	Shoalhaven Heads		
1148529	FOGARTY, Brooke Ann	1 September 2013	NSW	North St Marys	saved a woman from a knife attack	
1138342	Foley, James Ronald	17 March 2008	Vic	Swan Hill		
1138343	Foley, Steven James	17 March 2008	Vic	Late of Vinifera		
1135692	FOLVIG, Michael James	20 August 2007				
865688	FOORD, Michael Frederick	12 April 1994	Vic	Bundalong	Rescue of man from the Murray River at Bundalong	
865487	FORD, Andrew Malcolm	7 May 1992	NSW	Coffs Harbour		
1140513	FORD, Grant James	2 March 2009	Vic	Mount Macedon	On the night of 10 December 2006, Mr Ford rescued a man from a burning vehicle at Mount Macedon.	
865440	FORD, Peter Graeme	19 May 1999	WA	Thornlie	BM. For acts of bravery in hazardous circumstances. GAZ S370. 23 AUG 99	
865455	FORRESTER, Thomas William	12 October 1994	NSW	Nowra	Rescue from burning car at Pyree via Nowra	
1135693	FORSTER, Andrew John	20 August 2007				
1141435	FOSTER, Jack Ross	17 August 2009	Vic	Ararat	During the night of 18 May 2008, Jack Foster assisted his father who was assaulted in their home at Ararat, Victoria.	
1140514	FOSTER, Stephen Oswald	2 March 2009	Qld	Capalaba	On the night of 7 March 2004, Mr Foster assisted the rescue of two women being attacked by a man at Birkdale.	
865726	FOWLER, Stephen Leslie	18 April 1991			Rescue of man from gas filled cellar at Wellington	
865484	FOX, Bruce William	7 May 1992	NSW	North Ryde		
1058373	FOX, Stephen Gregory	21 February 2005				
865605	FRANCIS, James	26 November 1982	Vic	Burwood East		
865512	FRANKS, Robert James	1 November 1990	NSW	Yamba	Rescue from armed offender at New Farm	
865292	FRASER, John Kerr	12 June 1987	SA	Halidon	Assisted in rescue of three men from CO2 filled cellar	
865266	FREE, Craig	19 May 1999	Vic	Fitzroy North	Rescue and attempted rescue of intellectually disabled, Kew	
865601	FREE, William Athol	26 November 1982	NSW	Surry Hills		
1146494	FRENCH, Brett Raymond	19 March 2012	NSW	Blayney		
865259	FRLAN, Bartul	19 May 1999	Vic	Kew	Rescue and attempted rescue of disabled at Kew Cottages	
865442	FROSSOS, Michael	12 October 1994	WA	Nollamara	Rescued injured woman from burning car at Armstrong	
	FULLERTON, Jicenta-Leigh	30 March 2015				
865293	FULLSTON, Brian Douglas	12 June 1987	SA	Mindarie	Assisted in rescue of three men from CO2 filled cellar	
865621	GABY-BROWN, Warren Phillip	26 November 1982	NSW	Cromer		
1058374	GAJAWULA, Michael	21 February 2005				
865341	GARCIA, Elisio	29 April 1998	Vic	Blairgowrie	Surf rescue at Koonya Back Beach, Blairgowrie	
1140515	GARLICK, Daniel	2 March 2009	Vic	Cranbourne	On the early hours of 12 January 2008, Mr Garlick attempted the rescue of two children from a burning house at Cranbourne, Victoria.	
865295	GARRETT, Derek David	5 September 1988	NSW	Manly	Assisted rescue of man from sea at night	
1146573	GATENBY, Paul Bronte	27 August 2012	NSW	Batemans Bay		
1057469	GAWLER, David James	12 August 2004	Qld	Elanora		
865334	GEARD, Brian Craig	12 June 1987	Tas	Zeehan	Rescued men from sea after boating accident.	
1058375	GELME, Peter Duncan	21 February 2005				
865337	GIANNAROS, Fred	9 August 1985	Vic	Brunswick	Tackled man during bank hold-up	
1140516	GIAWA, Benar	2 March 2009			On the afternoon of 2 April 2005, Mr Giawa, a citizen of the Republic of Indonesia, helped rescue two Australian servicemen from a Royal Australian Navy Sea King helicopter crash on Nias Island, Indonesia.	
1129392	GIBBS, Stuart James	27 February 2006	Vic	Croydon Hills		
1144830	GIBSON, Darrin James	22 August 2011	NSW	Parkes		
865625	GIBSON, David Bowman	1 February 1985	WA	Roleystone	Rescued personnel from the oil rig 'Key Biscayne'	
865777	GIBSON, Ian Edward	15 October 1997	WA		For acts of bravery in hazardous circumstances. BM S45 1998	
1140517	GIBSON, Peter Thomas	2 March 2009	NSW		On the night of 2 August 1998, Sergeant Gibson (then Senior Constable) helped rescue a man from a burning house at Condobolin.	
865779	GILBERT, Jonathon	29 April 1998	NT	Winnellie	Rescued boy from crocodile attack at Peppimenarti, NT	
	GILLAN, Kurtis Terry	30 March 2015				
1135646	GILLIES, Mark Walter	6 August 2001	Tas	Deloraine		
1144831	GIOVANETTI, Ben Aaron	22 August 2011	Vic	Marysville		
1144832	GLEESON, Christopher Michael	22 August 2011	Vic	Marysville		
865291	GLENNY, Harry William	6 November 1987	Vic	Edithvale	In recognition for the rescue of children from a burning school bus.	
865397	GOLDEN, Wayne Bradley	10 April 1996	Qld	Kallangur	Rescue of child from burning house at Kallangur.	
1042915	GOLDTHORPE, Colin John	3 March 2003	NSW	Colyton		
1147515	GOMSI, Ernst	25 March 2013	Qld	Lowood		
865604	GOODCHILD, Kenneth George	25 June 1982	SA	Glenelg East	In recognition for the rescue of a man and his wife after their boat had been smashed against rocks at Granite Island.	
1139401	GOODMAN, Terry Barry	25 August 2008			From Essex in the UK	
1042916	GOODWIN, Bryan Joseph	3 March 2003	Qld	Rosedale		
1146574	GORRELL, Raymond Reginald	27 August 2012			Deceased.	
1057470	GORRIE, Brian Roger	12 August 2004	WA	Kalgoorlie		
865692	GOUGH, Neville Frederick	12 June 1987	NSW	Narooma	For bravery during rescue of two men from rough seas	
865289	GOURLAY, Robert Paul	30 January 1987	Tas	Claremont		
1134514	GOVENOR, Audra Jewell	12 March 2007			Queensland Police	
1146495	GRAHAM, Arron Damien	19 March 2012	Vic	Elliminyt		
1057471	GRAHAM, Hector Robert	12 August 2004	WA	Kalgoorlie		
865741	GRAHAM, Ross William	5 August 1983	Vic		For courage during persistent pursuit of armed bank robbers in Melbourne on 8 October 1982	
1140518	GRANT, Alan James	2 March 2009	NSW	Quakers Hill	On 5 January 2005, Mr Grant (then Sergeant with the New South Wales Police) helped rescue people from a burning vehicle at Telegraph Point.	
865790	GRANT, David Elliott	29 January 1982			For actions aboard HMAS Onslow after noxious gas leak on 1 March 1981	
865519	GRANT, Peter	7 May 1992	NSW	Coffs Harbour	For acts of bravery in hazardous circumstances	
865474	GRANT, Steven John	12 April 1994	Qld	Brisbane	For courage while overpowering mentally disturbed armed man during siege	
	GRAY, Mark Robert	30 March 2015			Queensland Police	
1044255	GRAYSON, Randal Peter	17 October 2003	NSW	Forbes		
1144833	GREATOREX, Regan Richard	22 August 2011	Qld			
865845	GREEN, Peter Michael	26 November 1982				
1041264	GREEN, Trevor Maxwell	12 August 2002	NSW			
865511	GREENWOOD, Conrad Stewart Latimer	1 November 1990	Qld	Toowoomba	For bravery during attempted rescue from armed offender at Toowoomba	
1141436	GREY, Dion	17 August 2009	Vic	Blackburn	On the morning of 4 September 2008, Mr Grey helped apprehend a man armed with a syringe at Box Hill.	
865501	GRICE, Leonie Gaye	28 April 1989	Tas	Burnie		
1058376	GRIFFIS, Austin John	21 February 2005				
1143301	GRIFFIS, James Marius	16 August 2010	NSW	Teralba	On the morning of 17 June 2008, Mr Griffis rescued a man from being stabbed at Teralba.	
1138344	Griffiths, Arthur John	17 March 2008	NSW	Wollombi		
865303	GRIGSON, Peter Robert	12 June 1987	WA	Eden Hill	Assisted in preventing woman from leaping from roof of bldg.	
865459	GRIMES, Brenton Charles	5 April 1995	SA	Linden Park	Rescue of man from path of oncoming vehicle at Taperoo	
1044256	GRONEBERG, Jake Michael	17 October 2003	NSW	Mullumbimby		
1138345	Groves, Benjamin James	17 March 2008	NSW	Glenroy		
865619	GROVES, Kevin Alister John	26 November 1982	NSW	Mona Vale		
1148530	GRULKE, Daniel	1 September 2013	Vic	Narre Warren South		
	GUELFI, Graeme Roy	30 March 2015				
1141437	GULLY, Jason Graeme	17 August 2009	Vic	Late of McRae	Late on the night of 28 November 2004, Mr Gully attempted to prevent an armed robbery at a club in Keysborough.	
1139402	GUNN, Ian Peter	25 August 2008	NSW	Narooma		
865336	HABLER, Garry John	6 November 1987	Qld	Caloundra	Drowned while attempting to rescue drowning wife	
	HADJ, Michael Bradley	17 August 2016				
1146496	HALCRO, Peter Gerard	19 March 2012	NSW	Matraville		
1144834	HALEY, Brendan John	22 August 2011	Qld			
	HALL, Damian Simon	24 March 2014				
1147516	HALL, Lisa Margaret	25 March 2013	NSW	Lowanna		
1148531	HALL, Michael Kenneth	1 September 2013	WA	Bedfordale		
1146497	HALL, Terrence Bruce	19 March 2012	Vic	Irrewarra		
865434	HAMEL, Scott Andrew	1 October 1998	NSW	Coraki	For acts of bravery in hazardous circumstances. BM S78 1999	
865600	HAMILTON, Robert Aylward	14 April 1993	Tas	Smithton	Rescue of woman trapped on a ledge at Cradle Mountain	
1142429	HAMILTON, Troy Anthony	15 March 2010	NSW		On the afternoon of 26 January 2008, Senior Constable Hamilton helped rescue a man during riots near the Rainbow Bay Surf Life Saving Club, Coolangatta, Queensland.	
1135383	HAMMOND, Fay Lorraine	14 February 2000	Qld	Marcoola		
1135539	HAMMOND, John Laurence	12 March 2001	NSW	Late of Sydney		
865389	HANGER, Gary Reginald	5 September 1988	NSW	Kingswood	Attempted rescue of youth after kayak sank	
865581	HANKS, Adam Christopher	1 November 1990	NSW	Yass	Rescue of elderly man from house fire at Yass	
1148532	HANLON, Sean Malcolm	1 September 2013			Queensland Police	
1144835	HANNAH, John William	22 August 2011	NSW			
865588	HANSON, Brendon John	6 November 1987	Vic	Lalor	Bravery Medal 16 March 1988. BY HIS ACTIONS MASTER HANSON DISPLAYED CONSIDERABLE BRAVERY	
1129393	HARDIE, Robert Eric	27 February 2006	Vic			
1147658	HARDING, Alfred John	25 March 2013	SA	Late of Craigmore		
1140519	HAREFA, Adiziduhu	2 March 2009			Republic of Indonesia. On the afternoon of 2 April 2005, Mr Harefa helped rescue two Australian servicemen from a Royal Australian Navy Sea King helicopter crash on Nias Island, Indonesia.	
1140520	HAREFA, Motani	2 March 2009			Republic of Indonesia. On the afternoon of 2 April 2005, Mr Harefa helped rescue two Australian servicemen from a Royal Australian Navy Sea King helicopter crash on Nias Island, Indonesia.	
865781	HARGRAVE, Laurence Edward	31 January 1986	NSW		NEW SOUTH WALES POLICE FORCE. Bravery Medal 14 May 1986	
1041235	HARLEY, Lori	12 August 2002	Vic	Rutherglen	On the afternoon of 16 January 2001, Miss Harley rescued a woman from an armed offender in St Kilda, Victoria.	
1138346	Harris, Clayton Ashley	17 March 2008	NSW	Bathurst		
1129394	HARRIS, Karly Louise	27 February 2006	SA	Yorketown		
1141438	HARRIS, Moomooga Tiatia	17 August 2009	Vic	Sydenham	During the early hours of the morning of 2 May 2007, Mr Harris detained an armed offender at a hotel in Taylors Lakes.	
865773	HARRIS, William Branston	31 January 1986	SA		Shot while tackling armed offender	
1135647	HARRISON, Alexander John	6 August 2001	WA	Wembley		
865725	HARRISON, Malcolm Wesley Cameron	12 October 1994	Qld		Bravery Medal For acts of bravery in hazardous circumstances QLD GAZ. S/63 3.3.95 Disarmed man armed with bomb, grenade & shotgun during siege, MLC Building, George Street, Brisbane 27.11.93.	
865614	HARRISON, Paul Jacob	7 May 1992	Vic	Ivanhoe	BM/Australian bravery decorations (SEP 92) For acts of bravery in hazardous circumstances	
865673	HART, Don	30 October 1991	NSW	North Nowra	BM/Australian bravery decorations May 92. For acts of bravery in hazardous circumstances	
865632	HARTAS, Bruce Kenneth	6 November 1987	ACT	Kambah	Tackled armed youth at primary school	
1135694	HARTLEY, Adam Colin	20 August 2007				
1135384	HARVEY, Kimball Adam	14 February 2000	NSW	Wymah		
1147517	HARVEY, Ryan Jon	25 March 2013	WA	Margaret River		
1059272	HAWES, Clinton James	29 August 2005				
1146498	HAWKINS, Andrew James	19 March 2012	Qld			
865301	HAWKINS, Kevin Richard	31 January 1987	Qld	Carina	Bravery Medal (posthumous award). 5 June 1987	
1144120	HAYTON, Murray John	21 March 2011	Qld	Goldsborough		
	HEAD, Kenric Robert	17 August 2016				
865308	HEALEY, Mark	18 April 1991	Tas	Sandford	Attempted rescue from drowning at Mystery Creek Cave	
1057472	HEALEY, Susan Kathleen	12 August 2004	Vic	Euroa		
865408	HEARD, Anthony Sidney	10 April 1996	Vic	Kew	Rescue of injured tanker driver at Waurn Ponds	
1058377	HEGARTY, Stephen Gregory	21 February 2005				
1144836	HEGGIE, Joshua Donald	22 August 2011	NSW	Captains Flat		
1146575	HENNOCK, Judith Therese	27 August 2012	NSW	Cootamundra		
1135695	HENRY, John Carlos	20 August 2007			Off Duty Fire Fighter rescued two people from a house fire. The house was well alight when John Henry gained access to the second storey to retrieve the two inside.	
1135453	HENRY, Stephen Michael	21 August 2000	NSW	Mays Hill		
865369	HENSLER, Priscilla Anne	27 October 1992	NSW	Moruya	For acts of bravery in hazardous circumstances.	
1144837	HENSLER, Scott Andrew	22 August 2011	Qld	Wondai		
1044197	HERING, Helmut Robert	11 August 2003	NSW	Blacktown		
1135385	HESLEWOOD, Richard	14 February 2000	NSW	Barden Ridge		
	HICKEY, Mark Patrick	17 March 2016				
1148533	HILDER, Katherine	1 September 2013	WA	Carine		
1139403	HILL, Henry	25 August 2008	NSW	Arrawarra		
	HILLIER, Jackson Douglas	19 August 2015				
865377	HILLYARD, Dennis Daniel	26 October 1993	SA	Angle Park	For the rescue of son from house fire at Angle Park.	
1147518	HINDMARSH, Bradley Damian	25 March 2013	Qld	Sorrento		
1131049	HINES, Kevin Wayne	18 September 2006	NSW	Chifley		
1135386	HIRMIZ, Mardeny	14 February 2000	NSW	Fairfield		
865677	HO, Thanh Van	4 May 1992	Qld	Inala	For the attempted rescue of children from a burning house.	
	HOAD, Calyn John	30 March 2015				
1135454	HOBDEN, Anthony James	21 August 2000	NT	Noonamah		
1135387	HODGE, John Gerald	14 February 2000	Qld	Wynnum		
865587	HOLBOURN, Christopher John	3 May 1990	SA	Henley Beach	For assisting a flight instructor to safety following a light plane crash.	
865797	HOLLIS, Graeme Wesley	19 May 1999	WA	Warnbro		
	HOLMES, Matthew Brian	18 August 2014				
865368	HOLMES, Simon David	27 October 1992	Qld	Sunnybank	For the rescue of a boy from a gang of armed youths.	
865765	HOLTON, Roland	30 October 1996	Tas	Launceston	For acts of bravery at a siege at Willow Lane, Prospect Vale.	
865831	HOOPER, David Gordon	30 October 1996	NSW		For the attempted rescue of child from a burning building at Minto.	
865327	HOPE, Christian	29 April 1998	NSW	Yagoona	For acts of bravery in hazardous circumstances. BM S287 1998	
	HORGAN, Robert J T	30 March 2015				
1056683	HORNERY, Matthew Jon	8 March 2004	NSW	Burradoo	On the night of 4 October 2000 Matthew Hornery attempted to rescue his baby daughter from a house fire in Melton, Victoria.	
1042917	HOUGHTON, Judith Ann	3 March 2003	Vic	Ballangeich		
865328	HOUSE, Beryl Jean	29 April 1998	NSW	Old Bar	For acts of bravery in hazardous circumstances. BM S287 1998	
865533	HOWARD, Gregory Patrick	27 October 1992	Tas	Cygnet	For acts of bravery in hazardous circumstances.	
1148534	HOWARD, Matthew William	1 September 2013	Vic	Beeac		
1056684	HOWARD, Paul	8 March 2004	Vic	Langwarrin	On the morning of 25 March 2001, Mr Howard rescued a woman from a house fire in the Melbourne suburb of Frankston North.	
	HOWARD, Rodney Charles	24 March 2014				
865376	HOWIE, David Hugh	26 October 1993	NSW	Mount Kuring-gai	For the attempted rescue of a man from an oncoming train at Mount Kuring-gai.	
865462	HOWIESON, Peter James	12 April 1994	WA	Forest Grove	For the rescue of a woman and attempted rescue of child at Conto's Beach.	
865398	HOY, Phillip Leslie	10 April 1996	Qld	Woodridge	For bravery during rescue of driver from burning truck at Archerfield	
1129395	HRABAL, Jiri	27 February 2006	Vic	Frankston		
865299	HUBBERT, Christopher William	9 August 1985	Qld	Goodna	For bravery during the rescue of two children from a burning house	
1135455	HUDSON, Peter Robert	21 August 2000	WA	Esperance		
1131050	HUGGINS, Simon Christopher	18 September 2006	Vic	Mornington Peninsula		
865780	HUGHES, Donald Ian	26 November 1982			For acts of bravery in hazardous circumstances.	
1044257	HUGHES, Peter Malcom	17 October 2003	WA	Como		
	HUGHES, Troy Anthony	17 August 2016				
1044258	HUGUENIN, Lynley Jane	17 October 2003	Vic	Wantirna		
1135388	HUITSON, Glen Anthony	14 February 2000	NT	Late of Adelaide River		
865480	HUNT, Christopher Robert	1 November 1990	Qld	Mooloolaba	For the rescue of two men from surf at Mooloolaba.	
865396	HUNT, Gwenda Jean	10 April 1996	Vic	Windsor	For the rescue of a boy under attack by a dog at Fawkner Park, South Yarra.	
865531	HUNT, Thomas Leatham	29 March 1993	SA	PRNOLS	For the rescue of a person from a burning vehicle.	
865645	HURRY, Allan Angus	5 August 1983	NSW	Unanderra	For the attempted rescue to save his brother from a burning building.	
1056685	HUTCHINSON, Carly Louise	8 March 2004	SA	Myponga	On an afternoon in February 1999, Ms Hutchison, then aged nine, rescued a toddler from a dam at Myponga.	
865527	IKONOMOPOULOS, Cleomenis	27 October 1992	NSW		Attempted to rescue father from armed offender at Belmore	
865352	IKONOMOPOULOS, John	27 October 1992	NSW		Attempted to rescue father from armed offender at Belmore	
865535	IKONOMOPOULOS, Nicholas	27 October 1992	NSW		Attempted to rescue father from armed offender at Belmore	
865272	INGRAM, Glen Donald	19 May 1999	Vic	PUCKAPUNYAL	BM. For acts of bravery in hazardous circumstances. GAZ S370. 23 AUG 99	
1057473	IOSIA, Faatiga	12 August 2004	Qld	Cairns	On the evening of 4 October 2003, Mr Iosia attempted to rescue his partners son from drowning in a rip at Yorkeys Knob beach near Cairns, Queensland.	
	ISAAC-DAVIES, Lindsy Mathew	30 March 2015				
865302	JACKA, Neil Richard	12 June 1987	SA	Copeville	For assisting in a rescue of three men from a CO2 filled cellar.	
1146499	JACKMAN, Paul	19 March 2012	NSW	Late of Croydon		
1139404	JACKSON, Fergus Butler	25 August 2008	Vic	Belmont		
1131051	JACKSON, Mark Andrew	18 September 2006	NSW	Late of Ryde		
1135389	JACKSON, Martin Glen	14 February 2000	Vic	Longford		
865540	JACKSON, Sandra	16 March 1991	WA	Stirling	For the rescue of a woman being threatened by six men.	
2002259	JAMES, Robert Michael	24 July 2018			Australian Federal Police Specialist Response Group diver displayed considerable bravery in the search and rescue of 12 young boys and their soccer coach from a flooded cave in the Tham Luang cave system in Northern Thailand.	
865707	JACOB, Anthony	11 April 1980	NSW	Ashfield	For the rescue of children from a burning 'ghost train', at Luna Park.	
1134515	JAQUES, Christopher Neil	12 March 2007			Victoria Police	
865409	JARRETT, Andrew John	10 April 1996	Vic	Hawthorn East	For the rescue of an injured tanker driver at Waurn Ponds.	
865251	JARY, Ronald Noel	9 April 1997	Vic	Late of Red Cliffs	For acts of bravery in hazardous circumstances. BM S374 1997	
1144121	JASINOWICZ, Anthony	21 March 2011	Vic	Wodonga	In the early hours of the morning of 7 January 2010, Mr Jasinowicz rescued a man from a burning truck at Albury.	
1135540	JENSEN, Raymond Thomas	12 March 2001	Vic	Noojee		
1138347	Jimenez, Alex Gilbert	17 March 2008	NSW	Edensor Park		
865840	JOEL, Murray Frank	9 August 1985			for flying a helicopter to rescue workers from an oil rig near Key Biscayne.	
1044198	JOHNS, Jason Matthew	11 August 2003	WA	Beeliar		
865436	JOHNS, Raymond Gregory	19 May 1999	Qld	Burleigh Heads	BM. For acts of bravery in hazardous circumstances. GAZ S370. 23 AUG 99	
1056686	JOHNSON, Andrew James	8 March 2004	Vic	Bacchus Marsh	In the early hours of 27 December 2001, Mr Johnson, then 16 years of age, pushed a friend out of the way of an oncoming vehicle in Bacchus Marsh, Victoria. Mr Johnson and his friend were walking along the gravel shoulder of a road when they heard a car approaching from behind.	
1142430	JOHNSON, Christine Margaret	15 March 2010			On the morning of 1 February 2007, Miss Johnson rescued a woman from a burning house at Arncliffe.	
865550	JOHNSON, Christopher John	1 November 1990	NSW	Queanbeyan	For the attempted rescue of persons from a hotel fire at Queanbeyan.	
1059273	JOHNSON, Dale Christopher	29 August 2005				
1141439	JOHNSON, Daniel Chan	17 August 2009	Qld	West End	On the morning of 26 December 2003, Mr Johnson confronted a man armed with a knife at West End, Brisbane.	
865305	JOHNSON, John Howard Lindsay	18 April 1991	SA		Fire on live sheep carrier Mukairish Alsades	
865447	JOHNSTON, Gregory Richard	14 April 1993	NSW	Smithtown	For the attempted rescue of a workmate from a blood vat at Macdsville.	
1141440	JOHNSTON, Jacqueline	17 August 2009	Qld	Balmoral	On the morning of 8 April 2005, Ms Johnston intervened during an attack on a woman by a male offender armed with a knife at a shopping centre in Brisbane.	
	JONES, Barry Charles	17 August 2016				
865548	JONES, Graeme Walter	26 October 1989	Tas	Devonport	For saving his workmate's life and displaying considerable bravery.	
865822	JONES, Graham Robert	30 October 1996	Tas	Launceston	On 21 September 1995 Mr Jones participated in the evacuation of a wounded Police Officer from a shooting incident at Prospect Vale.	
	JONES, Kennedy	18 August 2014				
1129396	JONES, Linton Charles	27 February 2006	Qld	Surfers Paradise		
865610	JONES, Marc Andrew	26 November 1982	NSW	Byron Bay	For assisting a friend who had been savaged by a shark.	
865584	JONES, Mark Robert	19 September 1990	Tas	Strahan	For assisting with a stranded vessel recovery.	
1142412	JONGSIND, Mark Andrew	12 March 1997	NSW	Liverpool	For the attempted rescue of child from burning building at Minto.	
	JORGENSEN, Troy Brian	18 August 2014				
1135390	JOYCE, Peter Clifford	14 February 2000	NT	Wulagi		
865832	JUDD, Ross Kenneth	26 October 1989			For the pursuit of armed offender at Woolloomooloo.	
865833	JUNKER, Martin Horst	30 October 1991	WA	Boulder	For acts of bravery in hazardous circumstances.	
	KAHLO, Phoebe Sylvia	17 August 2016				
865643	KARP, John	26 November 1982	Vic	Beaumaris		
865453	KAZZI, Said	5 April 1995	NSW	Macquarie Fields	For the rescue of a man from a burning house at Macquarie Fields.	
	KAWABATA, Soichi	19 August 2015				
865381	KEANE, Alan Anthony	26 October 1993	WA	Mandurah	For acts of bravery in hazardous circumstances Western Australia.	
865561	KEEN, Richard Anthony	20 April 1990	Vic	Hampton Park	For the rescue of a friend from a disused well at Hampton Park.	
1140521	KEILAR, Brendan Gerard	2 March 2009	Vic	Late of Hawthorn East	On the morning of 18 June 2007, Mr Keilar went to the assistance of a woman being attacked in Melbourne.	
865318	KEMP, Tracey Lee	6 November 1987	Vic	Lalor	For the attempted rescue of girl in a rice silo.	
1056697	KEMPEN, Peter Joseph VAN	8 March 2004	Vic		On the night of 15 January 2001, Ambulance Officer Wells rescued several people caught in a rip at Newcastle Beach, New South Wales.	
865627	KENNEDY, Ian Mark	26 November 1982	Vic	Malvern East		
1044259	KENNEDY, Michael Peter	17 October 2003	WA	Forrestfield		
1144838	KEOGH, Matthew Thomas	22 August 2011	Qld			
865401	KESSISSOGLOU, Michael	10 April 1996	WA	Perth	For the rescue of a man under attack by an intoxicated crowd of 50 at Perth.	
1145042	KEY, David Ernest	19 May 1999			For acts of bravery in hazardous circumstances.	
1153483	KEY, David	17 March 2016			Bar to Bravery Medal.	
1057474	KHAN, Gregory Alan	12 August 2004	Tas	Sandy Bay		
1135648	KICKETT, Daniel	6 August 2001	WA	Beckenham		
1135649	KICKETT, Noel John	6 August 2001	WA	St James		
1148535	KING, Heather Louise	1 September 2013	WA	Duncraig		
865228	KISTAN, Tony Vadivelu	9 April 1997	NSW	Summer Hill	Shooting incident at Port Arthur	
1147519	KLAASSEN, Johnathon Edward	25 March 2013	Qld	Grantham		
	KOCH-EMMERY, Tom Fairbridge	30 March 2015				
1134516	KOLOSQUE, Darren John	12 March 2007			New South Wales Police	
865748	KOSOVICH, Paul William	12 June 1987	WA		For acts of bravery in hazardous circumstances WESTERN AUSTRALIA. C OF A GAZETTE NO S 281 21 October 1987	
1044260	KRUSE, Hans	17 October 2003				
	KULASEKERA, Saliya Jimmy	30 March 2015				
865794	LACEY, David John	6 November 1987	Qld		Queensland Police Service. Bravery Medal 16 March 1988. BY HIS ACTIONS CONSTABLE LACEY DISPLAYED CONSIDERABLE BRAVERY	
865324	LACEY, Desmond Lawrence	29 April 1998	Qld	Yandina	Actions during armed robbery of bank at Yandina	
	LALOR, Guy Roland	17 March 2016				
865485	LAM, Yetti	7 May 1992	NSW	RANDWICK	BM/Australian bravery decorations (SEP 92) For acts of bravery in hazardous circumstances	
865407	LAMBKIN, James Thomas	10 April 1996	NSW	Jerrys Plains	Attempt rescue 3 men dead of carbon monoxide poisoning	
1057475	LANCASTER, Ashleigh Alan	12 August 2004	Vic	Hampton Park		
865603	LANGE, Terrence John	25 June 1982	Qld	Cooroy	Attempted rescue of 4 persons from electrified creek	
1134517	LANGFORD, Kenneth Rupert	12 March 2007	NSW	Springwood		
1139405	LANGHAM, Martin James	25 August 2008	NSW	Ashbury		
1141441	LANGSHAW, Greg James	17 August 2009	WA	Baldivis		
	LANSDOWN, Jeffrey Warren	17 March 2016				
	LANSDOWN, Barry John	31 March 2020				
1057476	LARKIN, Patrick Edward	12 August 2004	SA	Marryatville		
865754	LAUDER, Ian Victor	12 October 1994	NSW		Rescue from burning house at Coffs Harbour	
1143302	LAURIE, Robert Arthur	16 August 2010	Vic	Newborough	On 6 January 2009, Mr Laurie rescued a woman trapped under a capsized catamaran on Port Phillip Bay.	
	LAWRENCE, Brock	17 March 2016				
1135456	LAWRENCE, Dean Mati	21 August 2000	NSW	Lethbridge Park		
1144839	LAWSON, Grant Matthew	22 August 2011	Vic	Whittlesea		
865425	LAWTON, Bernard Francis	19 May 1999	SA	Ridgehaven	BM. For acts of bravery in hazardous circumstances. GAZ S370. 23 AUG 99	
865339	LAYT, Evan Gregory	31 January 1986	Qld	Cecil Plains	Rescued 4 persons from burning vehicle	
865256	LE BROCQ, Mavis	9 April 1997	NSW	New Burnt Bridge, Kempsey	Rescued two children from burning building near Kempsey	
1139406	LEE, Benjamin John	25 August 2008	Vic	Macorna		
865813	LEE, Brian Joseph	19 May 1999	NSW	Nowra	Rescue at sea during the Sydney to Hobart Yacht Race	
865690	LEE, Robert Patrick	30 October 1991	SA	Whyalla	BM/Australian bravery decorations May 92. For acts of bravery in hazardous circumstances	
1138348	Lehaney, Eric Ian	17 March 2008			Calgary ALBERTA CANADA	
865402	LENNOX, Naomi Louise	30 October 1996	WA	Perth	Protected doorman under attack at Studebaker Nightclub	
1056687	LEONE, Suzanne Luci	8 March 2004	Vic	Mentone	On the morning of 18 October 2000, Mrs Leone tried to rescue a woman who was being attacked by a man armed with a knife in the Melbourne suburb of Mentone.	
1057477	LEUSENKAMP, John Theodore	12 August 2004	Vic	Cranbourne North		
865252	LEVER, Leslie Dennis	9 April 1997			Shooting incident at Port Arthur	
865731	LEWCOCK, Jamie	18 April 1991	SA		Apprehended armed offender at Salisbury Interchange	
865810	LEWIS, Anthony William	12 June 1987	ACT		For acts of bravery in hazardous circumstances. AUSTRALIAN CAPITAL TERRITORY. C OF A GAZETTE NO S 281 21 October 1987	
1135541	LEWIS, Brynley David	12 March 2001				
1058378	LEWIS, Matthew Christoper	21 February 2005				
1148536	LEWIS, Simon Joshua	1 September 2013	NSW	Leithbridge Park		
1144840	LIBRERI, Thomas James	22 August 2011	Vic	Yinnar South		
	LIEBIG, Peter Gerhard	19 August 2015			Queensland Police	
1140522	LIMA, John Sione	2 March 2009	Qld		On the evening of 5 August 2003, Senior Constable Lima (then Constable) disarmed and apprehended a female armed with a gun at Birkdale, Queensland.	
1142431	LITTLE, Jeffrey Lester	15 March 2010			In the early hours of the morning of 23 May 1996, Detective Senior Constable Little took action at the site of a burning and exploding motor vehicle at Rankin Park.	
865411	LOADER, Graham Keith	14 April 1993	Vic	Beaumaris	Disarmed an offender in St Kilda Road	
	LOFDAHL, Christopher James	17 March 2016				
1135391	LONG, Anthony Francis	14 February 2000	NSW	Port Macquarie	Port Macquarie Police Station, Hay Street,	
1135457	LONG, James Anthony	21 August 2000	Vic	North Melbourne		
865618	LONG, Jennifer Anne	1 August 1986	Vic	Bendigo	Bravery Medal 12 November 1986	
1135458	LONGHURST, Garry Joseph	21 August 2000	NSW	Ashford		
1135392	LOOF, William James	14 February 2000	Qld	Salisbury		
1135459	LORD, Jason Andrew	21 August 2000	NSW	Mays Hill		
865727	LORENZUTTA, Aldo	11 April 1980			Hijack of Pan Am Boeing 747 at Sydney Airport	
865242	LOUGHTON, Carol Anne	9 April 1997	Vic	Ferntree Gully	For acts of bravery in hazardous circumstances. BM S374 1997	
865713	LOVERIDGE, Keith Edward	29 January 1982	Vic	Gisborne	Bravery Medal 8 April 1982. ON 21 April 1981 AT TULLAMARINE VICTORIA, MR LOVERIDGE DISPLAYED CONSIDERABLE BRAVERY IN RESCUING A YOUNG CHILD FROM A BURNING BUILDING	
1147520	LOWRY, David Eric	25 March 2013	SA	Hilton		
865630	LOWTHER, Sharon Marie	5 September 1988	SA	Noarlunga Downs	Rescued 3 men from treacherous seas at Murray Mouth	
1140523	LUCHETTI, Luke	2 March 2009	NSW	Yamba	On the afternoon of 2 November 2006, Mr Luchetti rescued a pilot and a passenger following a helicopter crash at Palmers Island, New South Wales.	
1042947	LUKAITIS, Peter Aldo	3 March 2003	Vic			
1139407	LY, Tu Vinh	25 August 2008	NSW	Late of Canley Vale		
	LYS, Brendan	19 August 2015				
865596	MacDONALD, Duncan James	5 September 1988	Vic	South Oakleigh	Attempted rescue of child from burning building	
865261	MACHIELSEN, Gavin	19 May 1999			Rescue from burning vehicle after accident on Stuart Hwy	
865486	MACKIE, Colin James Grahame	7 May 1992	NSW	Kingsford	BM/Australian bravery decorations (SEP 92) For acts of bravery in hazardous circumstances	
1146576	MacLUCAS, Derek Scott	27 August 2012	SA	Aldgate		
865609	MacPHERSON, Stephen James Hibbert	11 March 1983	NSW	Cooma	Attempted to save friends from burning car	
865517	MADDEFORD, Graham	30 October 1991	NSW	Bellingen	BM/Australian bravery decorations May 92. For acts of bravery in hazardous circumstances	
1057481	MADDEN, Sharon Ann	12 August 2004	NSW	Goulburn		
1044199	MAKO, Turanga Gisborne	11 August 2003	Qld	Burpengary		
1135461	MALLON, Lee James	21 August 2000	NSW	Kiama		
865298	MALOUF, John Joseph	30 January 1987	Qld	Kangaroo Point	Bravery Medal 5 June 1987	
2002264	MARKCROW, Christopher John	24 July 2018			Australian Federal Police Specialist Response Group diver displayed considerable bravery in the search and rescue of 12 young boys and their soccer coach from a flooded cave in the Tham Luang cave system in Northern Thailand.	
1057482	MARKS, Anthony John	12 August 2004	NSW	Goulburn		
865321	MARR, Michael John	29 April 1998	NSW	Boambee	For acts of bravery in hazardous circumstances. BM S287 1998	
1146577	MARSHALL, Bryon Alexander	27 August 2012	Vic			
865739	MARSHALL, Ross Victor	27 July 1984			Released pilot from wreckage of plane after crash	
865502	MARSHALL, Sperry Edward	5 September 1988	Tas	Glenorchy	Entered burning car in attempt to save trapped occupant	
865769	MARTIN, Alan Robert Thomas	18 April 1991	NSW		Rescue of man from gas filled cellar at Wellington	
1058381	MARTIN, Gareth Alexander	21 February 2005				
865361	MARTIN, Garry Daniel	26 October 1993	NSW	Bellingen	Rescue man from car damaged in fall over cliff Dorrigo Mount	
1144841	MARTYN, Ralph Paul	22 August 2011	Vic	Endeavour Hills		
1141442	MASON, Paul Thomas	17 August 2009	Qld		During the early morning of 27 May 2007, Constable Mason helped rescue a woman from a burning vehicle at Maryborough.	
865735	MASON, Ronald Thomas	28 April 1989	NSW		Apt. disarm suicidal offender in armoured personnel carrier	
865771	MASSEY, Paul	30 October 1991	NSW		NEW SOUTH WALES POLICE SERVICE. BM/Australian bravery decorations May 92. For acts of bravery in hazardous circumstances	
1147659	MATTHEWS, Samuel James	25 March 2013	Qld	Late of Spring Bluff		
865524	MATTISKE, Janelle Anne	27 October 1992	NSW	Via Forbes	BM/ For acts of bravery in hazardous circumstances. (March 93)	
1138349	Mattiuzzo, Daniela Linda	17 March 2008	NT			
865348	Maxted, Eric Jonathan	15 October 1997	NSW	Rankin Park	AKA EKI. For acts of bravery in hazardous circumstances. BM S45 1998	
865847	Maydy, Murray Brock	30 October 1991	NSW		Rescue from burning cars at Surry Hills	
865783	Mayne, Robert Frank	9 August 1985			Acted as hostage during siege	
1131052	Mayo, Sharon Elizabeth	18 September 2006	WA	Tom Price		
865386	Maythers, Jeffrey John	30 October 1991	NSW		NEW SOUTH WALES FIRE BRIGADES. BM/Australian bravery decorations May 92. For acts of bravery in hazardous circumstances	
865275	McALISTER, Kristy Yolander	19 May 1999	ACT	Gowrie	Rescue during the 1998 Sydney to Hobart Yacht Race	
1148537	McALPINE, Sally Lu	1 September 2013	WA			
865796	McCOY, Gregory Malcolm	12 June 1987	Vic		Bravery Medal. For acts of bravery in hazardous circumstances. VICTORIA. C OF A GAZETTE NO S 281 21 October 1987	
865463	McDERMOTT, Dean Maxwell Joseph	12 April 1994	NSW	Glenning Valley	Attempted rescue of men from crashed helicopter at Tuggerah	
865446	McDONALD, Glenn Charles	14 April 1993	Tas	St Marys	Rescued elderly woman from house fire at St Marys	
865574	McDONELL, Dr Angus Cecil	15 October 1997	Qld	Townsville	Rescue by helicopter of crew of stricken yacht ORCA Cyclone	
865608	McDOUGALL, Gregory Wayne	11 March 1983	Tas	Montagu Bay	Bravery Medal - GAZETTE S100 - 27 May 1983. DISPLAYED CONSIDERABLE BRAVERY IN RESCUING THE UNCONSCIOUS DRIVER OF A BURNING VEHICLE INVOLVED IN A TRAFFIC ACCIDENT, AND UNDOUBTEDLY SAVING HIS LIFE	
865710	McERLANE, Owen Keith	25 June 1982	NSW	Vineyard	Rescued two children from burning caravan	
1148538	McERLEAN, Warren William	1 September 2013	Qld	Toowoomba		
865684	McEVOY, Simon Paul	30 October 1991	NSW	Gosford	BM/Australian bravery decorations May 92. For acts of bravery in hazardous circumstances	
1135460	McEWAN, Paul Alexander	21 August 2000			Australian Federal Police	
1059274	McGIRR, Paul Francis	29 August 2005				
865830	McINNES, Glenn Phillip	9 April 1997	Vic	Portsea	Rescue of crew from disabled yacht 300 nautical miles	
1059275	McINTIRE, David John	29 August 2005				
865666	McINTOSH, Angus	30 October 1991	NSW	Kharruk	BM/Australian bravery decorations May 92. For acts of bravery in hazardous circumstances	
865415	McINTOSH, William Samuel	12 October 1994	Vic	Rainbow	Rescued disabled man from burning car at Rainbow	
1058379	McINTOSH-BROWN, John Edward	21 February 2005				
865477	McKELLIGOTT, Nathan John	7 May 1992	NSW	Coffs Harbour	BM/Australian bravery decorations (SEP 92). For acts of bravery in hazardous circumstances	
1057479	McKENZIE, Euan Scott	12 August 2004	NSW	Michelago		
865379	McKENZIE, Tony	26 October 1993	Qld	Hughenden	Rescued man from burning house at Hughenden	
1058380	McKINNELL, Michael John	21 February 2005				
1134518	McLACHLAN, Ronald Paul	12 March 2007	Vic	Narre Warren South		
865785	McLEAN, Martin Joseph	30 October 1996	NSW		Attempted rescue of child from burning building at Minto	
865778	McLEOD, Anthony John	12 September 1980			Restrained distressed man on cliff edge at Watsons Bay	
865667	McLERIE, Graham Hamilton	1 November 1990	Qld	Aspley	Bravery Medal. For acts of bravery in hazardous circumstances QUEENSLAND. C OF A GAZETTE NO S 67 16 March 1991	
865575	McLUNE, Catherine Sally	12 June 1987	Tas	Queenstown	Helped in rescue of companions lost in bush	
1057480	McMURTRIE, Christopher Bruce	12 August 2004	Qld	Yorkeys Knob		
1147521	McNAB, Bruce James	25 March 2013	Qld			
1135542	McNEIL, Lesley	12 March 2001	WA	Kalgoorlie		
865353	MCPAKE, Michael Casey	10 April 1996	NSW	Clovelly	Attempted rescue of friend from knife bearing man La Perouse	
1059276	McPHEE, Glenn James	29 August 2005				
865646	McRONALD, Lindsay James	11 March 1983	NSW	Beacon Hill	(Posthumous award). Bravery Medal - GAZETTE S100 - 27 May 1983. IN ATTEMPTING TO STOP A MAN RUNNING FROM A BODY LYING NEAR THE EDGE OF A ROAD WAS SHOT TWICE BY THE MAN AND LATER DIED FROM HIS INJURIES	
1059277	MEALEY, John Anthony	29 August 2005				
1140524	MEANEY, Craig	2 March 2009	NSW	Fairfield Heights	On 5 January 2005, Mr Meaney helped rescue people from a burning vehicle at Telegraph Point.	
1056688	MELLINGTON, William Thomas	8 March 2004	Vic	Rainbow	On the evening of 26 May 2002, Mr Mellington rescued a woman from a burning car after an accident in Werrap, Victoria.	
1057483	MELOURY, Kenneth John	12 August 2004	Qld	Booyal		
865347	MICHAEL, Clinton John	15 October 1997	Vic	Horsham	For acts of bravery in hazardous circumstances	
1057484	MICKLE, Eugene	12 August 2004	WA	Dunsborough		
865323	MIDDLETON, Clint Richard	29 April 1998	Qld	Toowoomba	For acts of bravery in hazardous circumstances. BM S287 1998	
865757	MILES, Robert Malcolm	26 October 1989	NSW		Rescue from burning building at Kings Cross	
1044262	MILLER, Andrew James	17 October 2003	NSW	Yarrawarrah		
1143303	MILLS, Geoffrey Robin	16 August 2010	WA	Port Hedland	On the morning of 14 June 2008, Mr Mills rescued two men after their trucks were caught in floods near Marble Bar.	
865734	MILLS, Glenn William	6 November 1987	NSW		Bravery Medal 16 March 1988. BY HIS ACTIONS CONSTABLE MILLS DISPLAYED CONSIDERABLE BRAVERY	
865346	MINERS, Owen Franklin	15 October 1997	NSW	Yass	For acts of bravery in hazardous circumstances. BM S45 1998	
1142432	MINTZ, Matti	15 March 2010	WA	Wembley Downs	On the afternoon of 19 October 2008, Mr Mintz rescued five people from a burning supermarket at Wembley Downs.	
1135650	MITCHAM, Simon Peter	6 August 2001	WA	Palmyra		
1140525	MITCHELL, Barbara Joan	2 March 2009	WA	Mandurah	On 22 November 2007, Mrs Mitchell rescued a woman who was being attacked by dogs at Mandurah.	
865563	MITCHELL, Brett Allan	26 October 1989	Qld	Norman Park	Rescue of 4 people from disabled yacht at sea off Brisbane	
865277	MITCHELL, Stephen Gerard	19 May 1999	ACT	Pearce	BM. For acts of bravery in hazardous circumstances. GAZ S370. 23 AUG 99	
1146500	MOFFATT, Paul Steven	19 March 2012	NSW	Botany		
1142433	MOHI, Dee-Anne Josephine	15 March 2010	Vic	Traralgon	On the morning of 4 December 2007, Ms Mohi rescued her two sons from a burning house at Traralgon.	
865557	MOHRING, Paul Eric	28 April 1989	Vic	Mount Evelyn	Bravery Medal 9 August 1989	
865545	MOLONEY, Jason Paul	1 November 1990	NSW	Belmont	Sea rescue after shark attack	
1057485	MONLEY, Mark John	12 August 2004	Qld	Childers		
865842	MONROE, Kimball Graham	12 April 1994	Qld	Brisbane	Rescued busdriver from armed prison escapee at Brisbane	
865616	MOORE, Bradley Barry	1 August 1986	Qld	Manly	Bravery Medal 12 November 1986	
1138350	Moore, Rachel	17 March 2008	Vic	South Yarra		
1144842	MORGAN, Daniel Troy	22 August 2011	Vic	Greensborough		
865456	MORGAN, Darren	12 October 1994	NSW	South Nowra	Rescue from burning car at Pyree via Nowra	
865526	MORGAN, Jamie Steven	18 April 1991	NSW	Swansea Heads	Rescue from capsized boat at Swansea Heads	
1139408	MORGAN, Patrick Ray	25 August 2008	NSW	Woronora		
1144843	MORGAN, Raymond Sidney	22 August 2011	Vic	Shepparton		
1144844	MORGAN, Shaun Clinton	22 August 2011	Vic	Preston		
865515	MORLEY, Richard John	18 April 1991	NSW	Wellington	Rescue of man from gas filled cellar at Wellington	
1135543	MORRIS, Richard Walter	12 March 2001	NSW	Lilyfield		
1147522	MORRIS, Sollee	25 March 2013	WA			
865819	MORRISON, Raymond George	31 January 1986			Shut off oxygen supply in burning aircraft after explosion	
865393	MORRISS, Brian John	9 April 1997			For acts of bravery in hazardous circumstances. BM S179 1997	
1147523	MORRISSEY, Brett	25 March 2013	Qld	Leichhardt		
1139409	MORTIMER, Andrew John	25 August 2008	NSW	Whitton		
1057486	MOTT, Garry John	12 August 2004	Qld	Booyal		
1142434	MOUCHEMORE, Bradley	15 March 2010				
1134519	MOYLAN, Jules Anthony	12 March 2007			New South Wales Police	
1138351	Muddle, Bradley Nathan	17 March 2008	NSW			
865528	MULDOWNEY, Wesley William	27 October 1992	Qld	Mackay	BM/For acts of bravery in hazardous circumstances. (MAR 1993)	
865583	MULROY, Allan	1 November 1990	NSW	Bondi	Rescue from sea at Bondi Beach	
1057487	MURCHIE, Joel	12 August 2004	NSW			
1142435	MURDOCH, Jack Kevin	15 March 2010				
1144845	MURPHY, Christopher John	22 August 2011	Vic			
1146578	MURPHY, Steven	27 August 2012	Vic			
865626	MURRAY, Clive Templeton	1 August 1986	NSW	Goulburn	Collapsed and died while rescuing young girl from surf rip	
865464	MURRAY, Gavin Fergus	12 April 1994	NSW	Mittagong	Attempted rescue of man from disused mine near Beaconsfield	
1144846	NANCARROW, Matthew John	22 August 2011	Vic	Corio		
865257	NASH, Peter Brenton	9 April 1997	Vic	Hoppers Crossing	For acts of bravery in hazardous circumstances. BM S374 1997	
1140526	NDRURU, Seti Eli	2 March 2009			Republic of Indonesia. On the afternoon of 2 April 2005, Mr Ndruru helped rescue two Australian servicemen from a Royal Australian Navy Sea King helicopter crash on Nias Island, Indonesia.	
865426	NEUNUEBEL, Michael Edward	19 May 1999	WA	Denmark	BM. For acts of bravery in hazardous circumstances. GAZ S370. 23 AUG 99	
865543	NEWCOMBE, Andrew Brian	3 May 1990	Qld	Burpengary	Rescue of a woman from flood waters at Burpengary	
865654	NEWMAN, David John	14 October 1983	SA	Cudlee Creek	Ash Wednesday bushfires	
865497	NEWMANN, Joy Annette	5 September 1988	Qld	Yeppoon	Rescued 5-year-old child from drowning at Yeppoon	
1135462	NEWTON, Richard Gerard	21 August 2000	NSW	Parramatta		
1140527	NGUYEN, Simon	2 March 2009	NSW	Smithfield	In the early hours of 13 May 2007, Mr Nguyen attempted to rescue a victim from a burning car at the scene of a crash at Mount White, New South Wales.	
865418	NGUYEN, Trung	12 October 1994	Qld	Gailes	Rescued 3 children from house fire at Gailes	
865503	NGUYEN, Van Cu	28 April 1989	NSW	Punchbowl	Bravery Medal 9 August 1989	
865585	NIELSEN, John David	3 May 1990	Tas	Strahan	Bravery Medal 19 September 1990	
865653	NITSCHKE, Barry Erwin	5 August 1983	SA	Cummins	Rescued child from burning building	
1044200	NIXON, Karen Leanne	11 August 2003	Qld	Bundaberg		
1056689	NORRIS, David Robert	8 March 2004	NSW	Nowra	In the early evening of 16 January 2003, Mr Norris helped to rescue a teenage girl at Racecourse Beach, Bawley Point, in New South Wales.	
865541	NORTHOVER, John Reagan	3 May 1990	WA	City Beach	BM 1990	
865387	NORTON, Andrew James	15 October 1997	WA	East Fremantle	For acts of bravery in hazardous circumstances. BM S45 1998	
865430	NOWLAND, Mervyn John	1 October 1998	NSW	Byron Bay	For acts of bravery in hazardous circumstances. BM S78 1999	
1143304	OBOIDHOGO, Eruore Ariyeanoga	16 August 2010	Vic	Melton South	On the morning of 5 September 2008, Mr Oboidhogo stopped a woman from setting fire to herself and a petrol station at Melton, Victoria.	
1057488	OBRIEN, Ross Cecil	12 August 2004	Qld	Childers		
865263	O'BRIEN, Bede John	1 October 1998	NSW	Werris Creek	For acts of bravery in hazardous circumstances. BM S78 1999	
865383	O'BRIEN, Christopher Michael	30 October 1991			For acts of bravery in hazardous circumstances.	
1129397	O'BRIEN, David Robert	27 February 2006	NSW	Saratoga		
865850	O'BRIEN, Glenn Raymond	30 October 1991	NSW		For acts of bravery in hazardous circumstances.	
	O'BRIEN, James Michael	20 August 2007				
1059278	O'BRIEN, Thomas David	29 August 2005				
865613	ODINE, Anthony John Robert	1 August 1986	WA	Balga	Bravery Medal. 12 November 1986	
1058382	O'DONNELL, Daniel	21 February 2005				
865801	O'GORMAN, John Kevin Vincent	9 August 1985			Confronted armed man during domestic dispute	
865355	OLDEN, Timothy James	10 April 1996	WA	Tambellup	Rescued driver from burning truck at Broomehill	
865804	OLIVER, Michael George	1 August 1986			Attempt rescue of sailors overcome by fumes on HMAS Stalwart	
1139410	OLIVER, Trevor Richard	25 August 2008	Vic	Bacchus Marsh		
865290	OLLIER, Mark Christopher	9 April 1997	Vic	Ferntree Gully	For acts of bravery in hazardous circumstances. BM S374 1997	
865660	O'NEILL, Frances Jane	18 April 1991	Tas	Taroona	Attempted rescue from drowning at Mystery Creek Cave	
865624	OSBORN, Nigel	1 February 1985	Tas	Lindisfarne	Rescued personnel from the oil rig 'Key Biscayne'	
865539	OSBORNE, Philip James	1 November 1990	WA	Stirling	Rescue of woman being threatened by six youths	
1135393	O'SHANNESSY, Mathew Martin	14 February 2000	Qld	Thargomindah		
865358	OTS, Jack	26 October 1993	Tas	West Moonah	Rescued unconscious workmate interior of empty petrol tanker	
1139411	OUAIDA, Billel	25 August 2008	Vic	Meadow Heights		
1139412	OUAIDA, Ibrahim	25 August 2008	Vic	Late of Meadow Heights		
865451	OUT, Jason Scott	14 April 1993	NSW	Black Town	Rescue of two children from burning house at Doonside	
865647	OVERELL, Brian Denis	14 October 1983	Qld	Coolum Beach	Rescued young girl from house fire	
1142436	PACEY, Mark Edwin	15 March 2010	Qld	North Rockhampton	During the night of 13 February 2008, Mr Pacey rescued a six-month-old child from floodwaters at Gogango Creek, Queensland.	
1135463	PALMER, Russell Lynton	21 August 2000	WA	Esperance		
865678	PANGQUEE, Peter	30 October 1991	NT	Malak	BM/Australian bravery decorations May 92. For acts of bravery in hazardous circumstances	
865679	PANG-QUEE, Lena Mary	30 October 1991	NT	Humpty Doo	BM/Australian bravery decorations May 92. For acts of bravery in hazardous circumstances	
1057489	PARENT, Guy Damien	12 August 2004	SA	Crafers		
865602	PARKER, George Henry Cranswick	25 June 1982	Qld	Cooroy	Attempted rescue of 4 persons from electrified creek	
865705	PARTINGTON, Kathryn Bridgette	11 April 1980	NSW	Forrestville	Rescued four children from ghost train fire at Luna Park	
1139413	PARTRIDGE, John Percival	25 August 2008	NSW	Keiraville		
865782	PASHLEY, Brian Shane	19 May 1999	NSW	Berry	BM. For acts of bravery in hazardous circumstances. GAZ S370. 23 AUG 99	
865631	PATTERSON, Julie Ann	5 September 1988	SA	Holden Hill	Rescued 3 men from treacherous seas at Murray Mouth	
865443	PATTESON, Michelle Francis	1 October 1998	NSW	Orange	Rescue of injured woman from crashed motor vehicle	
1135464	PAULL, Robert Walter	21 August 2000	Qld	Algester		
1148539	PEACH, Joshua Dylan	1 September 2013			Tasmania Police	
865450	PEARCE, Leigh Ronald	14 April 1993	NSW	Fern Hill	Attempted to save workmate during a mining explosion	
865249	PEARS, Glen	9 April 1997	Tas	Howrah	Shooting incident at Port Arthur	
1129398	PEAT, Robert Eric	27 February 2006	Vic	Melbourne		
865651	PEDDER, Geoffrey William	14 October 1983	SA	Ashton	Ash Wednesday bushfires	
1146579	PEDLER, Shane Francis	27 August 2012	NSW			
865320	PEMBER, Christina Lilian	15 October 1997	WA	Kalbarri	Transferred from rescue boat to another vessel in bad weather	
1146501	PERE, Ben Dolphas	19 March 2012	WA	Perth		
1135651	PERICH, Denis Steven	6 August 2001				
1044201	PERRY, Ross Walter	11 August 2003	WA	Australind		
1135394	PETERSON, Teresita	14 February 2000	NSW	Casula		
1146502	PETRESKI, Stojce	19 March 2012	NSW	Late of Brighton-Le-Sands		
865374	PETRICEVIC, Robyne Lynne	26 October 1993	WA	Forrestfield	Attempted rescue of woman attacked by knife bearing husband	
865525	PETTIGREW, Robert Ian	27 October 1992	NSW	Harrington	BM/For acts of bravery in hazardous circumstances (March 1993)	
1059279	PETTIT, Joel Armando	29 August 2005				
1146580	PHILLIPS, David James	27 August 2012	Qld	Gympie		
865287	PHILLIPS, Peter John	19 May 1999	NSW	Millers Point	BM. For acts of bravery in hazardous circumstances. GAZ S370. 23 AUG 99	
865676	PHILLIPS, Ricky Allan	15 October 1997	SA	Whyalla	For acts of bravery in hazardous circumstances. BM S287 1998	
1139414	PICKFORD, Glenn Richard	25 August 2008	NSW	Port Macquarie		
865329	PILLING, Carolyn May	29 April 1998	NSW	Thornleigh	For acts of bravery in hazardous circumstances. BM S287 1998	
1059280	PINNER, Wayne Morris	29 August 2005				
865572	PITTAWAY, William Jesse	31 January 1987	Vic	North Melbourne	Tackled armed offender	
1135465	PLUMB, Richard John	21 August 2000	NSW	Mudgee		
865333	POLLARD, Russell James	29 April 1998	NSW	Late of Brunswick Heads	For acts of bravery in hazardous circumstances. BM S287 1998	
1059281	POORE, Michael Leslie	29 August 2005				
865751	POTTER, John Robert	30 October 1996	SA		BM. FOR AN ACT OF BRAVERY IN HAZARDOUS CIRCUMSTANCES. SOUTH AUSTRALIA POLICE. C OF A GAZETTE NO S 81 12 March 1997	
1134520	POTTER, Richard William	12 March 2007	WA	Cookernup		
1041224	Potter, Warren Nicholas	18 February 2002	WA	Broome		
1135466	POULTER, Brian William	21 August 2000	Qld	Beenleigh		
865529	PRONK, Johan Marines	27 October 1992	NSW	Wollongong	BM/For acts of bravery in hazardous circumstances (MAR 93)	
1056690	PROTT, Michael Andrew	8 March 2004	NSW		On the night of 8 June 2002, Senior Constable Prott attempted to apprehend three men after an armed robbery at a video store in Richmond. Was assaulted by two of the three offenders and took a hammer to the head and was stabbed in the back with a knife.	
1056691	PROTT, Stephen Edmund	8 March 2004	NSW	Faulconbridge	On the night of 8 June 2002, Mr Prott attempted to apprehend three men after an armed robbery at a video store in Richmond, New South Wales. Was assaulted during the attempt by two of the three offenders and stabbed in the back with a screwdriver.	
1141443	PUGH, Rohan Kenneth	17 August 2009	WA	Secret Harbour		
865551	PURCELL, Caroline	26 October 1989		County Cork, Eire	Bravery Medal 19 September 1990. 51 PEARSE ROAD BALLYPHEHANE, CORK COUNTY CORK EIRE	
865518	QUATTROCCHI, Daniel Salvatore	18 April 1991	Vic	North Melbourne	Intercepted robbers of jewellery store at North Melbourne	
1134521	QUILLIAM, Melissa Maree	12 March 2007	Tas	Smithton		
1141444	QUINLAN, Kyle George	17 August 2009	Qld	Sunshine Coast	On the morning of 7 March 2007, Mr Quinlan (then Leading Aircraftman) rescued passengers from a plane crash at Yogyakarta, Indonesia.	
865571	RACANELLI, Daniel Thomas	12 June 1987			USA California. Attempted to rescue hang-glider pilot from power lines	
1058383	RAINBUMA, Margaret	21 February 2005				
865422	RANDLE, Anthony Craig	12 October 1994	Vic	Woori Yallock	Attempted rescue of baby from burning car at Mt Burnett	
1143305	RAO, Nathan	16 August 2010	Vic	Northcote	On the morning of 1 October 2006, Mr Rao's actions were responsible for the safe escape of three people from a burning boarding house at Brunswick, Victoria.	
1131053	RAWAS, James	18 September 2006	NSW	Late of Maroubra		
1131054	RAYMOND, David William	18 September 2006				
865448	RAYNER, Russell John	14 April 1993	NSW	Bowraville	Attempted rescue of workmate from blood vat at Macksville	
1058384	READER, David Charles	21 February 2005				
865747	REHN, Gregory Peter	26 October 1989	NSW		Rescue from burning building at Kings Cross	
1146581	REID, Timothy James	27 August 2012	NSW	Berridale		
865435	REILLY, Kim	19 May 1999	WA	Cooloongup	BM. For acts of bravery in hazardous circumstances. GAZ S370. 23 AUG 99	
1135395	REVELL, Raymond Alan	14 February 2000	Vic	Heathmont		
865509	REYNOLDS, Michael Daniel	1 November 1990	Qld	Mount Isa	Disarmed psychiatric patient at Mt Isa Hospital	
	RICE, Jordan Lucas	30 March 2015				
1135467	RICH, Glen Alan	21 August 2000	NSW	Kiama		
865737	RICHARDS, Gary Edwin	27 July 1984	Qld	Charters Towers	Moved person from vehicle suspected of containing bomb	
1058385	RICHARDS, George Peter	21 February 2005				
865649	RICHARDSON, Alan George	27 July 1984	Qld	Mount Gravatt	Rescued child from burning vehicle	
1144122	RICHMOND, Jeffrey Alan	21 March 2011			On the afternoon of 11 December 2008, Mr Richmond attempted the rescue of two of his sons caught in a rip at Mollymook Beach, New South Wales.	
865580	RIGALI, Elia	6 November 1987	WA	Wanneroo	Attempted to rescue friend from bottom of well	
1142437	RIGBY, Adrian John	15 March 2010	Vic	Red Hill South	On the morning of 25 September 2008, Mr Rigby rescued passengers trapped in a helicopter which had crashed into Talbot Bay, Western Australia.	
865595	ROACH, Thomas Arthur	6 November 1987	NSW	Beecroft	Tackled armed offender during hold-up attempt	
865680	ROBERTS, Andrew Neil	30 October 1991	SA	St Marys	Attempted rescue of woman from pool at Wangi Falls	
1138352	Roberts, Bevan John	17 March 2008			Rolleston, New Zealand	
1044202	ROBERTS, Danielle-Ann	11 August 2003	Qld	Stephens		
1044264	ROBERTS, David Gary	17 October 2003	NSW	Engadine		
1148540	ROBERTS,Sean Gary	1 September 2013	WA	Roleystone		
1131055	ROBERTSON, Shelley Maree	18 September 2006	WA	Guildford		
865736	ROBEY, Lester John	18 April 1991	NSW		Rescue of man from gas filled cellar at Wellington	
865805	ROBINSON, John Thomas Gates	1 October 1998	Vic		Removed aircraft from vicinity of suspected bomb Avalon Airport	
865532	ROBINSON, Joy Rosalie	27 October 1992	NSW	Moulamein	BM/For acts of bravery in hazardous circumstances. (March 1993)	
1138353	Robinson, Wayne Leslie	17 March 2008	NSW			
865300	RODD, Anthony John	30 January 1987	Qld	Thorneside	Bravery Medal 5 June 1987	
865481	RODGER, John Alwyn	7 May 1992	Qld	Boonah	BM/Australian bravery decorations (SEP 92). For acts of bravery in hazardous circumstances	
1140528	RODGERS, Anthony Charles	2 March 2009	NSW		On the night of 2 August 1998, Senior Constable Rodgers helped rescue a man from a burning house at Condobolin.	
865644	ROGERS, Gavin Francis	14 October 1983	SA	Late of Kalangadoo	Ash Wednesday bushfires - attempted to rescue five persons	
1041236	ROGERS, Steve Gordon	12 August 2002	Vic	Melbourne		
1143306	ROJAS-FORT, Helman	16 August 2010	NSW	Chippendale	On the morning of 25 April 2009, Mr Rojas-Fort rescued people from a burning house in Chippendale.	
1134522	ROLES, Pamella Jane	12 March 2007	Tas	Scottsdale		
865808	ROLLINSON, Harold Francis	29 January 1982			Royal Australian Navy. Bravery Medal - 8 April 1982. ON 1 March 1981 WHEN THE SUBMARINE HMAS ONSLOW WAS SUBMERGED PETTY OFFICER ROLLINSON DISPLAYED CONSIDERABLE BRAVERY WHEN HE AND ANOTHER SEAMAN ENTERED THE ENGINE ROOM, WHICH WAS FILLED WITH DENSE WHITE	
865340	RONALDS, Colin Bernard	31 January 1986	Vic	Maffra	Rescued 2 nephews from burning house	
1135468	ROSTRON, Richard Alan	21 August 2000			New South Wales Police Force	
865803	ROWE, Ian Richard	26 October 1993	SA		Bravery Medal. For acts of bravery in hazardous circumstances SOUTH AUSTRALIA. C OF A GAZETTE NO S 55 2 March 1994	
865738	ROY, Darren Campbell	12 April 1994	NSW		Rescue of disturbed woman from cliff at Terrigal	
865628	RUDDELL, Brian James	1 August 1986	WA	Bicton	Bravery Medal 12 November 1986	
1044265	RUSSELL, Brett Raymond	17 October 2003	NSW	Grays Point		
1148541	RUSSELL, James Marlon	1 September 2013	NSW	Yamba		
865394	RYAN, James Augustus	9 April 1997			For acts of bravery in hazardous circumstances. BM S179 1997	
1138354	Ryan, John Robert	17 March 2008			Houston, Texas	
1056692	RYAN, Mark Leslie	8 March 2004	Vic	Moyne	In the early morning of 25 October 2001, Mr Ryan rescued a man from a burning car after an accident at Illowa, Victoria.	
1138355	Ryan, Richard Leslie	17 March 2008	NSW	Shoalhaven Heads		
1135469	RYAN, Timothy William	21 August 2000	Qld	Palmwoods		
1135470	SADOWSKY, Arel Omar	21 August 2000	WA	Melville		
865491	SAGE, Glenn Noel	5 September 1988	ACT	Cook	Rescued people from burning vehicle	
865839	SALM, Kelvin Douglas	5 September 1988	Qld		Disarmed a mentally disturbed woman	
865330	SALZMANN, Robert	29 April 1998	NSW	Ocean Shores	For acts of bravery in hazardous circumstances. BM S287 1998	
865490	SAMUELS, Graeme Bernard	7 May 1992	NSW	Peakhurst Heights	BM/Australian bravery decorations (SEP 92). For acts of bravery in hazardous circumstances	
865770	SANDER, Nelson Henriks	5 September 1988	WA		WESTERN AUSTRALIA POLICE FORCE. Bravery Medal 21 December 1988	
1135396	SARANTAKOS, Evangelo	14 February 2000	NSW	Sydney	December 1998 Mr Sarantakos entered the water on multiple occasions to rescue kids caught in a rip at Sandbar Beach.	
1059282	SARRAF, John	29 August 2005				
1056693	SATAE, Monitini	8 March 2004	NSW	Chifley	In the early hours of 1 February 2002, Mr Satae rescued a man from a burning house in the Sydney suburb of Chifley.	
1144847	SAVAGE, Ben Thomas	22 August 2011	Qld	Kings Beach		
1059283	SAXON, Anthony Maxwell	29 August 2005				
865674	SCHIANO, Ralph Anthony	11 April 1980	NSW	Naremburn	Rescued four children from ghost train fire at Luna Park	
1146503	SCHOFIELD, Nathan Owen	19 March 2012	NSW	Nundle		
1144123	SCHULTE, Cameron	21 March 2011	NSW	Vittoria	On the afternoon of 8 December 2009, Mr Schulte rescued his father during a bushfire at their farm near Bathurst.	
865594	SCHULZ, Nicholas Lee	6 November 1987	Vic	Lalor	Bravery Medal 16 March 1988. BY HIS ACTIONS MASTER SCHULZ DISPLAYED CONSIDERABLE BRAVERY	
1148542	SCIDONE, Antonino	1 September 2013	WA	Harrisdale		
1041237	SCOTT, David Lindsay	12 August 2002				
865479	SEAWRIGHT, Alexander	7 May 1992	Qld	East Innisfail	BM/Australian bravery decorations (SEP 92). For acts of bravery in hazardous circumstances	
1135397	SEN, Muharem	14 February 2000	Vic	Coburg		
1135697	SEWELL, Keith Walter	20 August 2007	NSW	Allambie Heights		
1058386	SHANAHAN, Brendon Grant	21 February 2005				
1134523	SHARP, Alistair David	12 March 2007	Vic	Warrnambool		
865476	SHARP, Douglas Alvin	7 May 1992	NSW	Luddenham	BM/Australian Bravery Decorations(SEP 92). For acts of bravery in hazardous circumstances (Posthumous award)	
865250	SHARP, Kevin	9 April 1997	Vic	Kilmore	For acts of bravery in hazardous circumstances. BM S374 1997	
1058387	SHARP, Matthew Sidney	21 February 2005				
865373	SHEA, Lee Allan	14 April 1993	Qld	Rainbow Bay	Rescued surfer after shark attack at Duranbah Beach	
865537	SHELTON, Kelvin John	28 April 1989	Vic	Geelong	Bravery Medal - 9 August 1989	
1056694	SHERLOCK, Michael Patrick	8 March 2004	SA	Redwood Park	On the morning of 21 September 2002, Mr Sherlock rescued a woman from being stabbed by a man armed with a kitchen knife in the Adelaide suburb of Redwood Park.	
1144848	SHERRY, Carole Joan	22 August 2011	NSW			
1144849	SHERRY, Joseph Maurice	22 August 2011	NSW	Orangeville		
1135471	SHOLL, John George	21 August 2000	NSW	Potts Point	Headquarters Australian Theatre, 14-18 Wylde Street,	
1059284	SILLIS, David Francis	29 August 2005				
1059285	SILLIS, Janet Maree	29 August 2005				
1142438	SIMONETTA, Tony	15 March 2010	NSW	Gol Gol		
865262	SKINNER, Luke James	1 October 1998	Qld	Heatley	For acts of bravery in hazardous circumstances. BM S78 1999	
865552	SLIGHT, Graham Ralph	26 October 1989	Vic	Hampton Park	Rescue from disused well at Hampton Park	
1141446	SMALL, Allan Farley	17 August 2009	Vic	Wyndham Vale	On the morning of 8 April 2008, Mr Small rescued a woman from a burning house at Wyndham Vale.	
1058388	SMART, Dougal MacGregor	21 February 2005				
865363	SMITH, Beryl Ellen	26 October 1993	Vic	East Melbourne	Attempted to intercept an armed man at Mercy Private Hospital	
1139415	SMITH, Brian David	25 August 2008	Vic	Kerang		
1146582	SMITH, Catherine Lee	27 August 2012	WA	Baldivis		
1138356	Smith, Donald Paul	17 March 2008	Qld	Mackay		
1144850	SMITH, Jackson	22 August 2011	Qld	Little Mountain		
865424	SMITH, Michael John	19 May 1999	Vic	Warrnambool	Rescue of a man from the surf after a boating accident	
1139416	SMITH, Paul	25 August 2008	NSW			
865362	SMITH, Peter Edwin	26 October 1993	NSW	Tathra	Rescue of man from the sea at Tathra	
1135698	SMITH, Robert Arthur	20 August 2007	NSW	Harrington		
865784	SMITH, Shaun Damien	19 May 1999	WA	Noranda	Fire in the engine room of HMAS Westralia	
865578	SOAR, Christopher	26 October 1989	SA	Reynella	Rescue from houses fire at Brighton	
1131056	SOUTAR, George Callum	18 September 2006	NSW	Federal		
1129399	SOUTER, Ian Sherran	27 February 2006	Qld	Bayview Gardens		
1131057	SOUTHON, Darren Ian	18 September 2006	Vic	Marong		
865549	SPANDLER, Anthony Joseph	3 May 1990	ACT	Dickson	Bravery Medal 19 September 1990	
1146504	SPARKES, Robert	19 March 2012	NSW	Riverstone		
865265	SPARKS, Brian Keith	1 October 1998	Qld	Brisbane	BM. For acts of bravery in hazardous circumstances. GAZ S370. 23 AUG 99	
1058389	SPENCE, Philip Martin	21 February 2005				
865848	SPRIGGS, Murray Ian	9 April 1997	NSW	Richmond	Rescue of crew disabled yacht 300 nautical miles east Brisbane	
865665	SPRINGER, Matthew Wayne	1 August 1986	Tas	Legana	Bravery Medal 12 November 1986	
1057490	SQUIRES, Gary Edward	12 August 2004	Vic			
865245	ST JAMES, Steven John	15 October 1997	Qld	Brisbane	For acts of bravery in hazardous circumstances. BM S45 1998	
865617	STACEY, Peter Garnett	1 August 1986	WA	Waroona	Bravery Medal 12 November 1986	
1134524	STAFFORD, Daniel Peter	12 March 2007	Vic	Malvern East		
1056695	STALLARD, Andrew George	8 March 2004	WA	Nannup	On the morning of 19 April 2003, Mr Stallard attempted to rescue his mother after she had been swept off rocks at Black Point, Augusta.	
1056696	STALLARD, Paul David	8 March 2004	WA	Nannup	On the morning of 19 April 2003, Mr Stallard attempted to rescue his mother after she had been swept off rocks at Black Point, Augusta.	
1134525	STANIFORTH, Craig Alun	12 March 2007			Wiltshire, England	
865473	STARR, Janette Anne	1 October 1998	Qld	Stanwell	For acts of bravery in hazardous circumstances. BM S78 1999	
865708	STEPHENS, Wayne Ralph	11 April 1980	SA	Warradale	Rescued suicidal woman from the sea at Brighton Jetty	
865536	STEVENS, Stuart Anton	28 April 1989	Vic	Frankston	Bravery Medal 9 August 1989	
865659	STEWART, Gregory Charles	10 February 1984	Qld	Jacobs Well	Rescued elderly man from burning house	
1041265	STEWART, Robert Blair	12 August 2002				
865468	STILLITANO, Lui	5 April 1995	SA		Attempted rescue of woman from knife bearing man at Hindley	
1042922	STIRTON, Harold James	3 March 2003	Vic	Kangaroo Flat		
865806	STOKER, Barry Arthur	31 January 1986	NSW		Confronted armed man during dispute	
1148543	STONE, Jason Bryce	1 September 2013	Vic	Maryborough		
1057491	STONEBRIDGE, John James	12 August 2004	WA			
865470	STONEHOUSE, Lindsay Malcolm	5 April 1995	Tas	Penguin	Apprehesion robber armed syringe allegedly AIDS infected	
865559	STORM, Allan Richard	28 April 1989	Qld		Attempted rescue of boy from drowning	
1058390	STRATHERN, Lisa	21 February 2005			Ms Strathern rescued tandem jump parachutists whose harness had become entangled as they jumped from a plane flying above Caboolture, Queensland.	
1059286	STRATTON, Matthew	29 August 2005				
865809	STRONG, Ronald Vincent	28 April 1989	Qld		Hijack/siege at Eagle Farm Airport by armed offender	
865567	STRUM, Simon Jason	6 November 1987			C/- HOTEL CARIARI SAN JOSE COSTA RICA. Bravery Medal 16 March 1988. BY HIS ACTIONS SIMON STRUM DISPLAYED CONSIDERABLE BRAVERY	
1135699	STUART, David Paul	20 August 2007				
1135398	STUBBS, David Robert	14 February 2000	Qld	Mudgeeraba		
1144851	STYLIANOU, Matthew Lee	22 August 2011	Vic	Mulgrave		
865523	SUIKER, Dave Jan Roelof	27 October 1992	WA	Lesmurdie	BM/For acts of bravery in hazardous circumstances. (March 1993)	
1129400	SULLIVAN, Gregory Paul	27 February 2006	WA	Port Kennedy		
865671	SWAN, William Adamson	30 October 1991	WA	Collie	BM/Australian bravery decorations May 92. For acts of bravery in hazardous circumstances	
865577	SWENDSON, Russell Christopher	6 November 1987	Vic	Glen Waverley	Died while attempting to rescue third child from house fire	
865510	SWIFT, Gregory Alan	1 November 1990	Vic	Inverloch	Rescue after shark attack at Kilcunda Beach	
1129401	SWINNERTON, Luke	27 February 2006	NSW	Terrigal		
1140529	TAMMS, Edward George	2 March 2009	WA	Mandurah	On the afternoon of 22 January 2007, Mr Tamms went to the assistance of a person who was being attacked by a dog at Coodanup.	
1143307	TANTI, Simon Victor	16 August 2010	Vic	Sunbury	On the morning of 22 December 2007, Mr Tanti rescued a child from a burning house at Sunbury.	
865720	TAPP, John Ralph	18 April 1991	SA	Darlington	Intercepted armed offender at bank in Marion	
865359	TARRAN, Peter Michael	26 October 1993	NSW	North Dorrigo	Rescue of man from car damaged in fall over cliff on Dorrigo	
1058391	TARVER, Keith	21 February 2005				
1058392	TAYLOR, Charles Henry	21 February 2005				
1138357	Taylor, Gregory Michael	17 March 2008	NSW	Shoalhaven Heads		
865343	TAYLOR, Paul Joseph	29 April 1998	UK	West Midlands	For acts of bravery in hazardous circumstances. LATE OF 47 WESTBOURNE STREET, WALSALL, WEST MIDLANDS WS4 2JB UK. BM S287 1998	
865472	TAYLOR, Roy Ernest	5 April 1995	Qld		Apprehended 2 armed offenders at Ingleburn	
865432	TERWISSCHA, David	1 October 1998	NSW	Pendle Hill	For acts of bravery in hazardous circumstances. BM S78 1999	
1146583	TESTER, Daryl Ian	27 August 2012	SA	Inglewood		
1144124	TETAAHI, Charles Temanihi	21 March 2011	Qld	Chevron Island	On the evening of 28 May 2010, Mr Tetaahi rescued a boy from drowning in the Nerang River, Surfers Paradise, Queensland.	
865655	TETLEY, Paul Anthony James	5 August 1983	Vic	Essendon	Wounded while apprehending offender during armed robbery	
1135472	THIRSK, Andrew Colin	21 August 2000	NSW	Killarney Heights		
865496	THOMAS, William Gregory	5 September 1988	Qld	Warner	Awardee had injured arm at time of rescuing a boy from surf	
865546	THOMPSON, Bradley David	1 November 1990	NSW	Belmont North	Sea rescue after shark attack	
1139418	THOMPSON, Paul	25 August 2008	NSW			
1058393	THOMPSON, Stephen Paul	21 February 2005				
865471	THOMSON, Doran Carl	5 April 1995	WA	Collie	Rescue of man from burning car at Collie	
1041239	THORNTON, Jayden Peter	12 August 2002	NSW	Bligh Park		
1059287	THREADGATE, Ross Leslie	29 August 2005				
865611	TICKLE, Barry Gordon	1 August 1986	SA	Morphettville	Rescued occupants of burning vehicle	
865297	TIERNAN, Dermot Joseph	12 October 1994	Qld	Murgon	Assisting police officers during a violent disturbance	
865607	TIERNEY, Michael John	11 March 1983	Vic	Moonee Ponds	Bravery Medal GAZETTE S 100 27 May 1983. DISPLAYED CONSIDERABLE BRAVERY BY TACKLING AN ARMED AND DANGEROUS MAN AND THWARTING A ROBBERY	
1057492	TO, Nam Duc	12 August 2004	WA	Morley		
865445	TOOLE, Peter Ralph	14 April 1993	NSW	Caragabal	Rescue of injured driver from burning vehicle at Caragabal	
1138358	Toomey, John	17 March 2008	NSW	Mathoura		
1135544	TORNEY, Michael Robert	12 March 2001	Vic	Bundoora	Disarming of La Trobe University gunman, Johnathon Brett Horrocks on August 3, 1999	
865685	TOUSSAINT-JACKSON, Paul Benjamin	30 October 1991	NSW	North Sydney	BM/Australian bravery decorations May 92. For acts of bravery in hazardous circumstances	
865380	TOWNLEY, Russell James	10 April 1996	Qld	Bray Park	Rescue of driver from burning truck at Archerfield	
1059288	TRAN, Simon BUI	29 August 2005				
1058484	Traver, Keith	21 February 2005				
865288	TRAYNOR, Murray	19 May 1999	NSW	Woodford	Rescue during the 1998 Sydney to Hobart Yacht Race	
1044266	TREACY, Daniel Paul	17 October 2003	NSW	New Brighton		
865489	TREVENNA, Peter Albert	28 April 1989	NSW	Alexandria	Bravery Medal 9 August 1989	
865772	TREVILLION, Joshua	30 October 1991	NSW		Rescue from burning cars at Surry Hills	
865740	TRICKETT, Gregory Paul	5 September 1988			Bravery Medal 21 December 1988. SOUTH AUSTRALIA POLICE FORCE	
1147524	TUHIWAI, Bubby Kopaki	25 March 2013	WA	Wagin		
865760	TUNCHON, Phillip James	26 October 1993	NSW		Rescue of woman attempting suicide at Echo Point, Katoomba	
1138359	Tupou, Josiah Tamata'ane	17 March 2008	Qld	Forest Lake		
865816	TURNER, Lester Shane	28 April 1989	Qld		Rescue of police officers from motor vehicle after accident	
865331	TURNER, Paul	29 April 1998	NSW	St Marys	Rescue from burning house at St Clair	
1141447	UDINGA, Paul Richard	17 August 2009	WA	Walyunga National Park	During a series of rescue events, beginning in the early hours of 2 April 2004, Mr Udinga was involved in the rescue of an injured woman from the flooded Hancock Gorge in the remote Karijini National Park.	
1148544	URQUHART, Jo-Anne	1 September 2013	WA	Connolly		
865820	VALLE, Alan John	18 April 1991	SA		Fire on live sheep carrier Mukairish Alsades	
865482	VAN NIEKERK, Michael Anthony	7 May 1992	Tas	Blackmans Bay	BM/Australian bravery decorations (SEP 92). For acts of bravery in hazardous circumstances	
1142439	VANDENBERG, Timothy William	15 March 2010	NSW	Gol Gol	On the afternoon of 30 July 2004, Mr Vandenberg rescued a man from a burning car wreck at Gol Gol, New South Wales.	
1147525	VARELA, Con	25 March 2013	NSW	Kingscliff		
865534	VASILJEVIC, George	7 May 1992	NSW	Cabramatta	BM/AUST BRAVERY DECORATIONS (SEP 92). For acts of bravery in hazardous circumstances	
865623	VAUGHAN JOHNSON, Robin Campbell	1 February 1985	WA	Kalamunda	Rescued personnel from the oil rig 'Key Biscayne'	
1134526	VEA, Chea Christopher	12 March 2007	NSW	Leichhardt		
865675	VELLA, Paul Anthony	30 October 1991	NSW	Rockdale	BM/AUSTRALIA BRAVERY DECORATIONS May 92. For acts of bravery in hazardous circumstances	
1144125	VERBAKEN, Harry William	21 March 2011	Vic		In the early hours of the morning of 15 March 2009, Leading Senior Constable Verbaken rescued a man from a burning house at Benalla.	
1131157	Verity, John Christopher	6 April 2001	WA	Attadale		
1135652	VERITY, John Christopher	6 August 2001	WA	Attadale		
1135473	VILLANUEVA, Enrico	21 August 2000	NSW	Ashfield		
1147526	VISSCHER, Nathan Christopher	25 March 2013	NSW	Redhead		
1147527	VON NIDA, Russell Robert	25 March 2013	Qld	Buccan		
1135545	VUKADIN, Ante	12 March 2001	Qld	Dimbulah		
865745	WALDRON, Tony Glen	12 June 1987	NT		Bravery Medal. For acts of bravery in hazardous circumstances NORTHERN TERRITORY. C OF A GAZETTE NO S 281 21 October 1987	
865835	WALKER, Alan James	6 November 1987	NSW	Bexley	Bravery Medal 16 March 1988. BY HIS ACTIONS AMBULANCE OFFICER WALKER DISPLAYED CONSIDERABLE BRAVERY	
1041266	WALKER, Graham John	12 August 2002	NSW	Narraweena		
865763	WALKER, Neil Andrew	26 October 1993	NSW	Dorrigo	Rescue man from car damaged in fall over cliff on Dorigo Mou	
1044267	WALLACE, Anthony John	17 October 2003	NSW	Forbes		
865419	WALLER, Simon Peter	12 October 1994	Qld	Meadowbrook	Disarmed man holding hostages at Loganlea TAFE College	
865672	WALLING, Kenneth Richard	30 October 1991	WA	Nollamara	BM/Australian bravery decorations May 92. For acts of bravery in hazardous circumstances	
865338	WALSH, Simon John	30 January 1987	Vic	Maffra	Bravery Medal 5 June 1987	
865668	WALTERS, Debra Anne	30 October 1991	Vic	Murrumbeena	BM/Australian bravery decorations May 92. For acts of bravery in hazardous circumstances, In the early hours of Jan 1991 under threat of a loaded crossbow and restrained by thumb cuffs Ms Walters broke free and snatched the crossbow firing it into the roof and attempted to fight off the armed robber. By her actions Ms Walters displayed considerable bravery.	
1141448	WANG, Xinkang	17 August 2009	NSW	Sydney	On 5 March 2008, Mr Wang assisted in the rescue of hostages detained by a man armed with explosives on a bus at Xi'an, China.	
1144852	WARD, Brett Anthony	22 August 2011	NSW			
1135399	WARD, James Martin	14 February 2000	Vic	Glenmaggie		
865356	WATHEN, George Mervyn	29 April 1998	Qld	Keppel Sands	For acts of bravery in hazardous circumstances. BM S287 1998	
1129402	WATSON, Allison	27 February 2006	WA	Capel		
1135400	WATSON, Jason Gerald	14 February 2000	Vic	Sale		
865837	WATT, Stowell James	28 April 1989	Qld		Police operation organised to apprehend an offender	
1059289	WAUGH, Garry Maxwell	29 August 2005				
1059290	WEBB, Constable Adam	29 August 2005				
1134527	WEBB, Geoffrey John	12 March 2007			Victoria Police	
1146505	WEBSTER, Lisa Jane	19 March 2012	Vic	Vermont		
1056698	WELLS, David	8 March 2004	NSW	Swansea	On the night of 15 January 2001, Ambulance Officer Wells rescued several people caught in a rip at Newcastle Beach, New South Wales.	
865492	WELLS, Mark Anthony	5 September 1988	Tas	Warrane		
865466	WELLS, Martin James	5 April 1995	NSW	Lismore	Rescue by helicopter of 2 injured people, disabled yacht	
1140530	WELLS, Rodney Newman	2 March 2009	WA	Quairading	On the night of 10 January 2008, Mr Wells rescued two occupants from a burning vehicle at Quairading.	
1141449	WEST, John Macleay	17 August 2009	Qld	Bucca	During the early morning of 27 May 2007, Mr West helped rescue a woman from a burning vehicle at Maryborough, Queensland.	
1140531	WEST, Trent James	2 March 2009	WA	Kalgoorlie	On 5 January 2005, Mr West helped rescue people from a burning vehicle at Telegraph Point.	
865568	WHEATLEY, Mark John	30 October 1991	NSW	Drummoyne	BM/Australian bravery decorations May 92. For acts of bravery in hazardous circumstances	
865469	WHELAN, Baden Eric Grant	5 April 1995	Tas	Cambridge	Rescue from overturned fishing vessel on the Mainwaring River	
1144853	WHITE, Darren John	22 August 2011	Vic	Bayswater		
1041241	WHITE, Stuart James	12 August 2002				
1135546	WHITE, Todd Matthew	12 March 2001	Qld	Albany Creek	Rescued a woman from a house fire in Albany Creek, Queensland, two people were unable to be saved	
1135474	WHITEHOUSE, Margaret	21 August 2000			Late of 3 Nightingale Gardens, Hook,	
1146584	WHITLOCK, Fred David	27 August 2012	Vic	Yarra Glen		
1135653	WHYATT, Gary	6 August 2001	WA	Perth		
865682	WIESE, David Graeme	30 October 1991	Vic	Hamilton	BM/Australian bravery decorations May 92. For acts of bravery in hazardous circumstances	
865622	WIGZELL, Terry Robert	1 August 1986	SA	Cherry Gardens	Bravery Medal 12 November 1986	
1141450	WILKINS, Jeanette Margaret	17 August 2009	NSW	Castlereagh	On 5 March 2008, Mrs Wilkins assisted in the rescue of hostages detained by a man armed with explosives on a bus at Xi'an, China.	
1135547	WILKINSON, Christopher Valan	12 March 2001	NSW	Engadine		
865849	WILLIAMS, Alan David Lloyd	27 October 1992	Qld	Kirwan	BM/For acts of bravery in hazardous circumstances (March 1993)	
1041295	WILLIAMS, Brent Andrew	18 February 2002			North Island New Zealand	
1141451	WILLIAMS, David Kevin	17 August 2009	SA	Paracombe	On the afternoon of 29 April 2007, Mr Williams rescued a man from a burning house at Hope Valley.	
865661	WILLIAMS, Geoffrey Andrew	29 January 1982	Vic	Rutherglen	Rescued two men from burning car after accident	
865656	WILLIAMS, Leonard Richard	5 August 1983	NSW	Wyoming	Rescued child from path of oncoming train	
865664	WILLIAMS, Leonard William	1 August 1986	SA	Blair Athol	Overpowered gunman during bank robbery	
1146506	WILLIAMS, Michael Patrick	19 March 2012	NSW	Maclean		
865395	WILLIAMS, Michael Vincent	9 April 1997			For acts of bravery in hazardous circumstances. BM S179 1997	
1146507	WILLIAMS, Peter Lloyd	19 March 2012	NSW	Belmont		
865811	WILLIAMS, Shane Robert	28 April 1989	Qld		Rescue of police officers from motor vehicle after accident	
1144854	WILLIAMSON, Gregory John	22 August 2011	Vic	Taggerty		
1135475	WILSON, Adam	21 August 2000			New South Wales Police Force	
1057493	WILSON, Noel Edgar	12 August 2004	WA	Floreat		
865360	WINKLER, Errol Desmond	26 October 1993	NSW	Dorrigo	Rescue man from car damaged in fall over cliff on Dorrigo Mo	
1135476	WINKWORTH, David Leslie	21 August 2000	NSW	Kalaru		
865570	WINNING, Jody Christopher	12 June 1987	SA	Paradise	Assisted in rescue of 5 yr old boy from burning house	
865326	WITT, Campbell	29 April 1998	WA	Bicton	Rescue of a child from sea at Lights Beach, Denmark, WA	
1059291	WOLENS, Bradley Cecil	29 August 2005				
1129403	WONG, Foon Yoon	27 February 2006	Vic	Blackburn North		
865569	WOODS, Bruce Colin	5 September 1988	Qld	Blackwater	Rescue of fellow worker - mine cave in	
1147528	WOODTHORPE ANDERSON, Ross James	25 March 2013	NSW	Lane Cove		
865420	WOODWARD, Michael	12 October 1994	NSW	Dee Why	Attempted rescue of woman being stabbed at Harbord	
865460	WOOLLETT, Brian Allan	11 October 1995	Qld	Jandowae	Rescue of one man and attempted rescue of another burning ve	
1138360	Woolsey, Colin Patrick	17 March 2008	NSW			
865255	WRIGHT, John Gordon	30 October 1996	Qld	Boonah	FOR AN ACT OF BRAVERY IN HAZARDOUS CIRCUMSTANCES. C OF A GAZETTE NO 81 12 March 1997	
865322	WRIGHT, John Patrick	9 April 1997	NSW	Cronulla	For acts of bravery in hazardous circumstances. BM S374 1997	
865366	WRIGHT, Larry Joseph	14 April 1993	NSW	Claremont Meadows	Rescued man from burning vehicle at Claremont Meadows	
1146585	WRIGHT, Nathan Andrew	27 August 2012	Qld			
1041296	WYLAARS, Stephanie Maria	18 February 2002	Vic	Mount Waverley		
865555	YABSLEY, Cheryl Lynda	26 October 1989	NSW	Bilgola Plateau	Rescue from house fire at Newport	
865706	YATES, Gary Patrick	7 August 1981	NSW	Umina	Tackled armed man during bank hold-up	
865728	YATES, Phillip John	5 August 1983	NSW		NEW SOUTH WALES POLICE FORCE. Bravery Medal 28 October 1983. RESCUE OF TWO WOMEN FROM A VEHICLE STRANDED IN THE FLOODED NUMERALLA RIVER ON 1 January 1983	
1152560	ZAGHINI, Joseph	19 August 2015				
865686	ZAMAGIAS, Billy	30 October 1991	NSW	cabramatta	Rescue of elderly woman from burning house at Cabramatta	
1154441	ZARTH, Corey John	17 August 2016				
	MAGARRY, Megan Leanne	30 March 2015			Queensland Police	
	MAHONY, Erin James	30 March 2015				
	MASKELL, Sean Christopher	19 August 2015			Queensland Police	
	McILRATH, David William	17 August 2016				
	McKNEIL, Jai	19 August 2015				
	McMAHON, Michael John	17 August 2016				
	McNICOL, Mark John	24 March 2014				
	MEACHAM, Christopher John	17 March 2016				
	MEEK, Bradley John	17 March 2016				
	MILLS, Amos John	18 August 2014				
	MILLS, David Edward	17 March 2016				
	MITCHELL, Charles Allan	17 March 2016				
	MORASSO, Ronald Albert	17 March 2016				
	MORRISON, Bradley William	17 March 2016				
	MORROW, Lisa Dianne	17 March 2016				
	NALLY, Ryan Alexander	19 August 2015				
	NIXON, David	17 August 2016				
	NUGENT, Joseph Mark	17 August 2016				
	O'HARE, Colin Raymond	18 August 2014				
	O'KEEFE, Nigel Ross	19 August 2015			Queensland Police	
	PEARSON, Michael James	19 August 2015			Queensland Police	
	PENPANUSSAK, Nattapat	19 August 2015				
	PICONE, George Keith	17 March 2016				
	POLINI, Warren Gregory	17 August 2016				
	PRICKETT, Michael John	17 March 2016				
	PULFORD, Luke James	30 March 2015				
	PYKE, Christian Anthony	17 March 2016				
	RACE, Daniel Martin	24 March 2014				
	RADCLIFFE, David	24 March 2014				
	REBBECHI, Daniel	24 March 2014				
	REILLY, Tammy Louise	17 August 2016				
	RICH, Glen Alan	21 August 2000				
	RIXON, David James	19 August 2015			NSW Police	
	ROSSINGTON, Paul Richard	17 March 2016				
	RYAN, Ian Thomas	18 August 2014				
	RYAN, Michael James	18 August 2014				
	SCHRADER, Shayden Bray	30 March 2015				
	SENEVIRATNE, Mathew Evan	18 August 2014				
	SHEARER, Rod	30 March 2015				
	SHERIDAN, Ruth Lynden	18 August 2014				
	SIMPSON, Daniel	17 August 2016				
	SKEWES, Robert Allen	18 August 2014				
	SMITH, Scott Graham	18 August 2014				
	SMITH, Thomas James	19 August 2015				
	SMYTH, Jeffrey Ryan	30 March 2015				
	SPIERS, Aleziah	19 August 2015				
	STEPHENSEN, Tony	30 March 2015				
	STRONG, Jamie Alan	19 August 2015				
	TAWSE, Shane Colin	17 August 2016				
	TOWNLEY, Jarrad Nathan	18 August 2014				
	TURKINGTON, Alan Kennedy	30 March 2015				
	van EGMOND, Conrad Wayne	17 March 2016				
	WALLACE, Cameron	19 August 2015			Victoria Police	
	WATTS-SEALE, Michael Andrew	17 August 2016				
	WHITE, David Alan	18 August 2014				
	WHITTRED, Joel Michael	19 August 2015			Queensland Police	
	WICKRAMATHUNGA, Ishan Chathuranga	18 August 2014				
	WILLIAMS, Paul David	17 August 2016				
	WILLSMORE, Andrew Phillip	30 March 2015				
	WILSON, Marcus	17 August 2016				
	WILSON, Thomas William	30 March 2015			Queensland Police	
	WILTSHIRE, Jenny Ann	19 August 2015			Victoria Police	
