= Streptomyces lunaelactis =

Scientific classification
- Domain: Bacteria
- Kingdom: Bacillati
- Phylum: Actinomycetota
- Class: Actinomycetia
- Order: Streptomycetales
- Family: Streptomycetaceae
- Genus: Streptomyces
- Species: S. lunaelactis

Binomial name
- Streptomyces lunaelactis Maciejewska et al. 2015

Type strain
- DSM 42149, MM109, MM113

Species of actinobacteria isolated from moonmilk and producing ferroverdin A

Streptomyces lunaelactis is a bacterium species from the genus of Streptomyces which has been isolated from moonmilk speleothem from a cave in Comblain-au-Pont in Belgium. Streptomyces lunaelactis produces ferroverdin A.

== See also ==
- List of Streptomyces species
- Moonmilk – Creamy, cave-crystallized carbonates
- Ferroverdin – Green pigment produced in the mycelium of Streptomyces
