= Grattai =

Grattai New South Wales
- Coordinates: 32°40′16″S 149°29′13″E
- Population: 330 (2021 census)
- Postcode(s): 2850
- Location: 288 km (179 mi) NW of Sydney; 190 km (118 mi) SE of Dubbo; 24 km (15 mi) SW of Mudgee
- LGA(s): Mid-Western Regional Council
- State electorate(s): Electoral district of Dubbo
- Federal division(s): Calare

Grattai is a locality in New South Wales, Australia. It is located about 24 kilometres (15 mi) south of Mudgee. In the 2021 census, it recorded a population of 330 people.
