= Hobart railway station =

Former railway station in Tasmania, Australia

Hobart
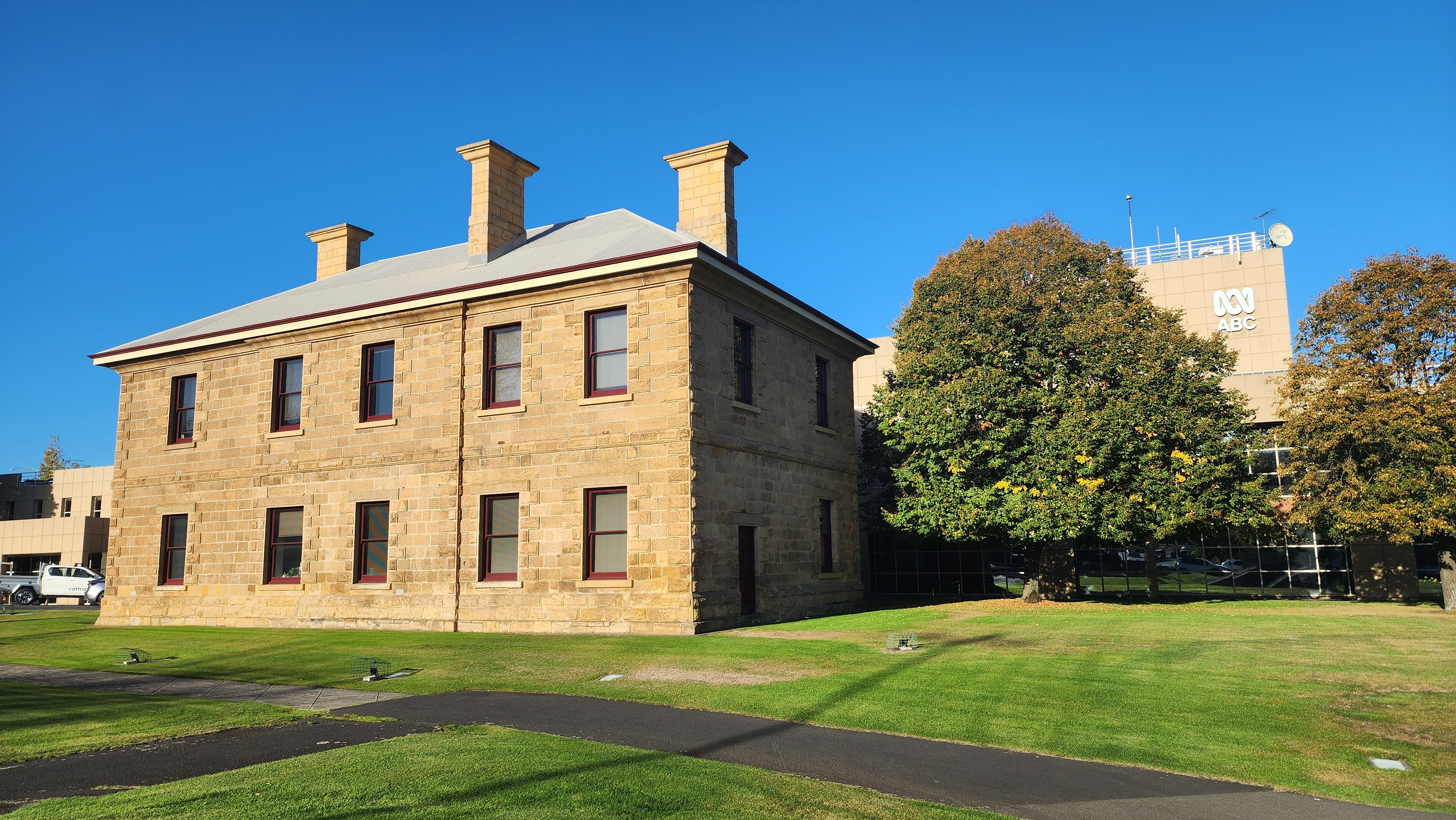
- The 1871 Hobart railway station building was redeveloped in the 1980s into the Tasmanian headquarters of the Australian Broadcasting Corporation

General information
- Location: Liverpool Street, Hobart, Tasmania; Australia
- Coordinates: 42.8778°S 147.3320°E
- System: Closed commuter rail station
- Operator: Tasmanian Government Railways
- Line: Main Line
- Platforms: 4
- Tracks: 10

Construction
- Parking: None
- Cycle facilities: None

Other information
- Status: Closed

History
- Opened: 1871
- Closed: 18 July 1978 (Tasman Limited); 22 June 2014 (TasRail)
Location

Hobart railway station, now closed and redeveloped, was the largest railway station on the Tasmanian Government Railways (TGR) network. The station was the southernmost terminus of the South Line, facilitating passenger train services to Hobart's northern suburbs and the Tasman Limited, a regional limited express service linking Hobart, Launceston and Wynyard.

Constructed by the Tasmanian Main Line Company (TML) in 1871, in the early 1950s, the station was significantly expanded: new facilities included three new 180-metre (600 ft) long concrete cantilevered canopies, four platforms, a large concourse, and various amenities such as shopping stalls and food vendors.

By the mid-1970s, the station handled more than 70 commuter trains per day. However, with a decline in passenger numbers due to the growth of privately owned vehicles and the transfer of rail transport operations to Australian National Railways, the station's significance waned. The last Tasman Limited passenger service departed on 18 July 1978.

Following the announcement of the Sheraton Hotel masterplan, the station was sold and redeveloped into the headquarters of the Australian Broadcasting Corporation in the mid-1980s. Sections of the track were removed to connect the Tasman Highway through Davey and Macquarie Streets.

== History ==
The Tasmanian Main Line Railway Company (TMLR) opened the line from Hobart to Evandale Road (later Western Junction) in 1876. This railway significantly reduced travel times between Hobart and Launceston, making transportation more efficient and accessible.

During its peak in the 1930s and 1940s, the Tasmanian railway system was extensive, radiating from Launceston and Hobart to various regional destinations such as Herrick, St Marys and Marrawah. The railways enabled widespread access to goods and passenger services and were a major employer, offering a wide range of jobs.

In 1937, a proposed new railway station plan, outlined by Premier Albert Ogilvie and submitted for consideration by the Public Works Committee encountered mixed reactions. Designed with a 43-metre (140 ft) frontage on Argyle Street and praised for its efficient layout by architect Colin Philp, the station aimed to boost suburban railway traffic. Estimated at £A225,600, including a 640-metre (700 yd) tunnel under the Queens Domain to avoid public disruption, the project garnered technical approval despite objections by the Hobart General Hospital (now named Royal Hobart Hospital) over space constraints: all available land near the proposed site was considered crucial for hospital expansion. Despite city council intentions and proposals, a new railway station did not materialise. This delay can be attributed to competing political priorities, including a focus on Great Depression employment relief works such as the kunanyi/Mount Wellington summit road (1937) and other major civic projects such as the Royal Hobart Hospital (1939) and Hobart Bridge (1939). Additionally, the onset of World War II further diverted attention and resources away from infrastructure projects.

Despite its historical importance and widespread use during its heyday, the Tasmanian Government Railways faced challenges during World War II, leading to over-use and under-maintenance. In the 1940s, Hobart railway station was described as being in a dilapidated state. Observers noted the poor condition of the seating, scattered litter, and structural faults. Despite the station's run-down condition, trains were reported to be arriving on time.

By 1946, the Parliamentary Standing Committee on Public Works recommended the construction of a new parcels office and toilet facilities at an estimated cost of £A7,625. This was part of a broader plan to eventually rebuild the entire station. The planned modern station was to include cafeterias, a kindergarten, and a clock tower, among other amenities. Discussions also included the potential for integrating a bus terminal with the railway station to create a combined transport hub, which would improve efficiency and reduce traffic congestion. Ultimately, in a post-war state hindered by limited economic prospects, political conversations rooted in bounded rationality continued until the conclusion of the decade. In 1949, Hobart railway station installed a new, nearly fully automatic weighbridge, costing £A2,000. It could weigh loads up to 51 tonnes (50 LT) and weigh two goods wagons simultaneously. Verified by the Department of Weights and Measures, it was part of a larger program to install 14 new weighbridges across Tasmania.

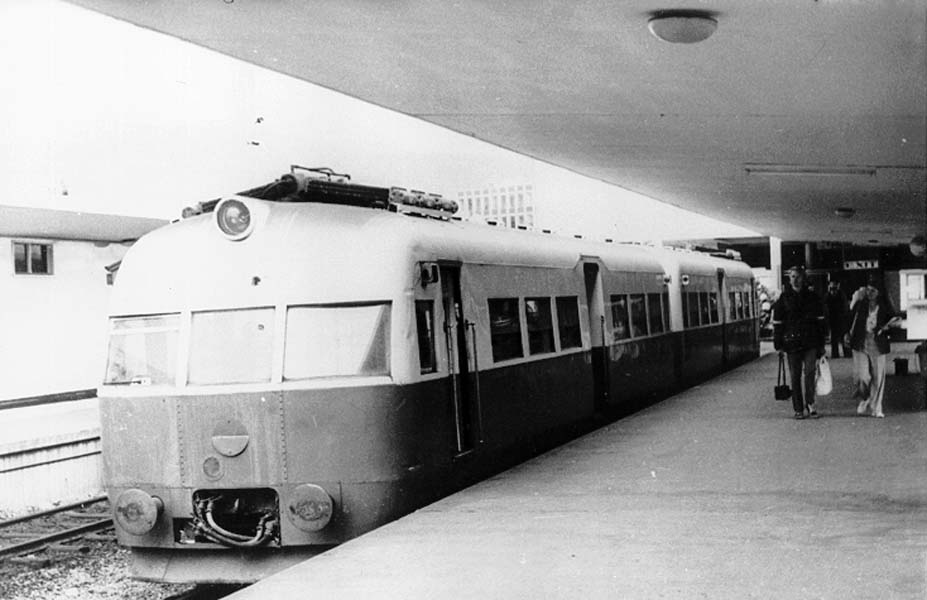
Railway platforms and suburban diesel railcar, circa 1972

During 1950-1953, significant discussions and decisions were made regarding the Hobart railway station. The Hobart City Council determined that moving the station closer to the Domain was impracticable. Instead, a modified plan was approved, including the widening of Park Street and considering an under-pass or over-pass for Macquarie Street. A new two-storey building was planned on the Domain side to house staff facilities, with an eventual demolition of buildings on the Park Street side. Additionally, discussions on creating a viaduct over the railway near the station to improve traffic flow were held. The new station plans aimed to meet modern standards and support the increasing suburban and passenger traffic. The new platforms at the Hobart railway station opened on Wednesday, 22 October 1952. This marked the first use of three out of the five new platforms constructed as part of the station's redevelopment.

By the 1970s, declining passenger patronage and financial difficulties prompted the closure of many passenger services, including the last train from Wynyard to Hobart in July 1978.

On 22 June 2014, TasRail ended rail freight operations at the Hobart rail yard after 140 years of service as part of a strategy to consolidate and enhance intermodal container freight services. All freight operations were redirected to the new $79 million Brighton Transport Hub, located in the northern suburb of Brighton.

In 2024, the Tasmanian Heritage Council added a 115-metre (377 ft) rail shed constructed in 1915 at the former rail yard, known as the "Goods Shed," to the state's heritage register, recognising its significant role in Tasmanian rail history.

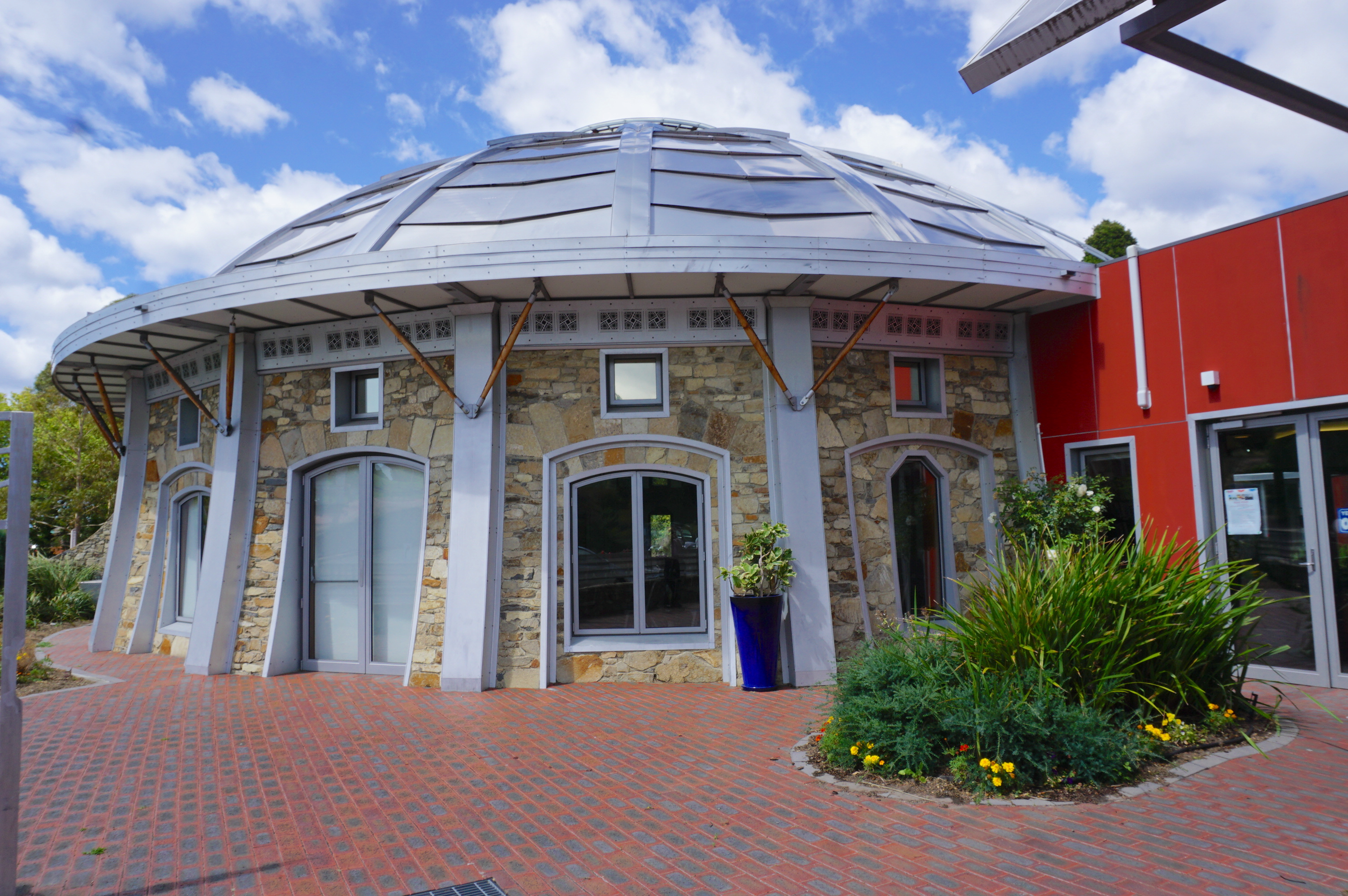
The Bahá’í Centre of Learning

Since the closure of the Tasmanian Government Railways, Hobart's public transport infrastructure has seen limited development, and a proposed light rail project (Riverline) has faced uncertainties due to political and financial challenges. Today, the redeveloped Hobart railway station site houses the studios of the Australian Broadcasting Corporation, WIN Television and the Baháʼí Faith Centre of Learning, with the only remaining part of the rail terminal the original sandstone TML station building from 1871.

== Services ==
The Hobart railway station provided passenger train services to Hobart's northern suburbs and served as the central terminus for the Tasman Limited, a limited express service linking Hobart, Launceston and Wynyard. It also offered weekday service trains for employees of Cadbury's Chocolate Factory and Risdon Zinc Works during peak hours and special event services, such as the Hobart Cup and Royal Hobart Show.

=== Tasman Limited ===
The Tasman Limited was one of the only named train operated by TGR, the other being the Midland Motor. (The West Coaster was operated by the private Emu Bay Railway.) Inaugurated in April 1954, the train originally began as an express railcar service; however, later became a first-class luxury passenger service, operated with special articulated coaching stock, buffet service and modern X class diesel locomotives. Seating was reserved, and the service ran from Hobart railway station to Wynyard with connections to Launceston, every day of the week except Sundays.

The Tasman, as it was colloquially known, outlasted all other TGR passenger services, and was officially the last regular scheduled government passenger train to operate on the Tasmanian rail network, the last train departed Hobart on 28 July 1978.

== Structures ==
In addition to its passenger services, the station served as Hobart's transport hub for freight operations, featuring a rail yard, a goods station with goods sheds, and a traction maintenance depot with a railway turntable and roundhouse.

=== Goods shed ===
Erected in 1915, the single-storey goods shed is a timber-framed, rectangular structure, mostly clad in painted corrugated steel sheeting, measuring about 115 by 24 metres (377 ft × 79 ft). The roof consists of two gabled sections. The interior features timber framing and trusses, original openings for timber sliding goods doors, and narrow, textured glass panels in white-painted timber frames, all deemed highly significant for heritage. The structure was heritage-listed in 2024. Under a current development proposal by Cox Architects, the Goods Shed will be relocated about 100 metres (330 ft) north, forming part of the Macquarie Point Stadium precinct entryway.

=== Railway Roundabout ===
The Railway Roundabout is a 1960s roundabout, featuring a distinctive fountain designed by workers at the Cadbury factory, which won an international competition. Originally celebrated as a space-age gateway to the city, the fountain and surrounding area fell into disrepair by the late 1990s. However, a $370,000 restoration in 2012 revived its significance. The fountain, characterised by its Googie architecture, is now protected by heritage listing and continues to serve as a prominent community space, highlighted during events such as Dark Mofo.

=== Roundhouse ===
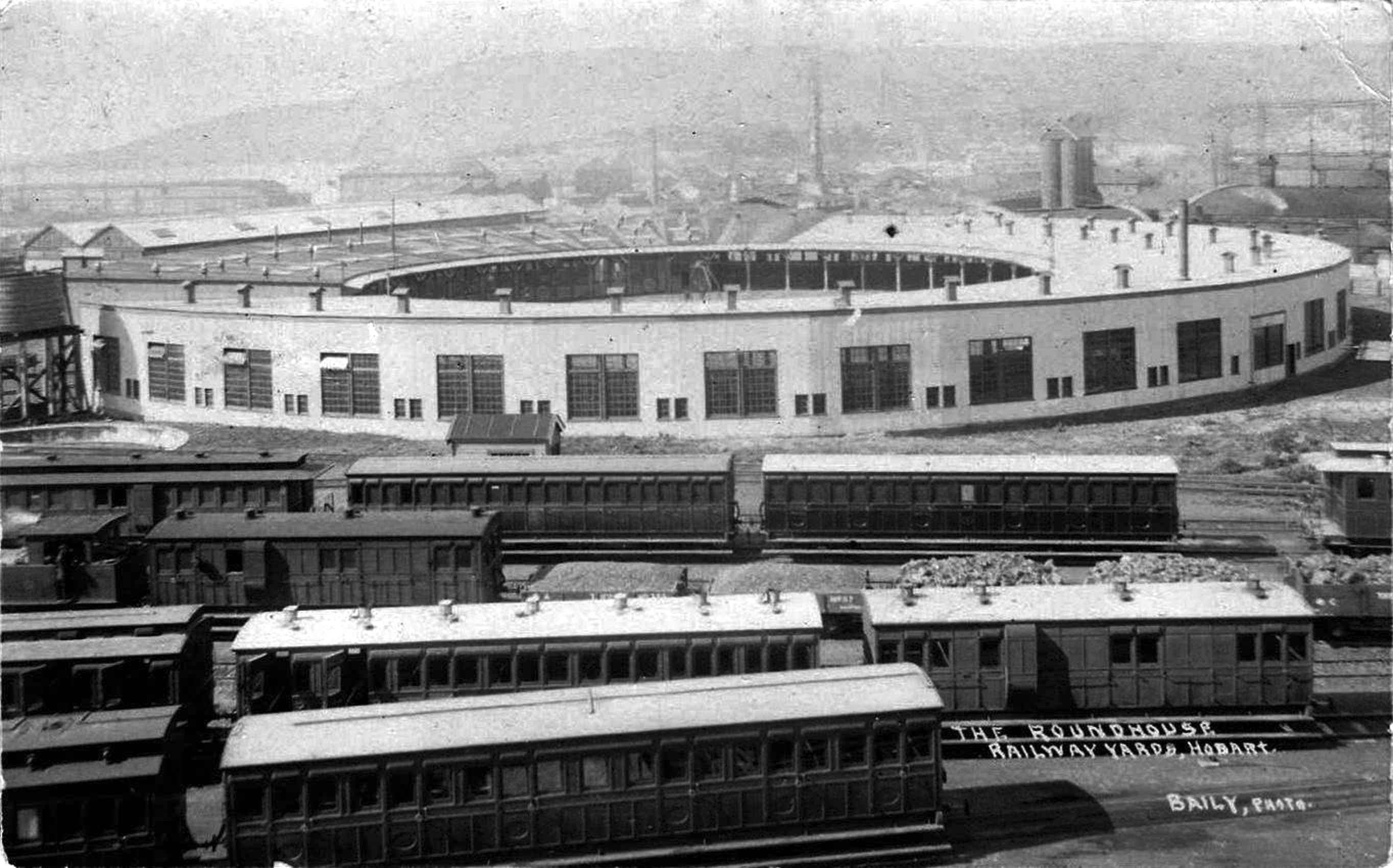
Newly completed roundhouse, 1914

The Hobart Roundhouse, with a diameter of 102 metres (334 ft), was a significant railway roundhouse capable of theoretically accommodating 22,000 people and featuring a 23 metres (75 ft), electrically driven turntable, the largest in Australia, which could turn 60 locomotives per hour. It served 45 engine roads and housed modern facilities such as hydraulic lifts for removing locomotive wheels, hot water circulation for boiler cleaning, and various staff amenities. Demolished in stages by 1984, the roundhouse has inspired development proposals at Macquarie Point, including an unrealised 2015 masterplan by John Wardle and the 2024 Macquarie Point Stadium precinct plan by Cox Architects.

== Gallery ==
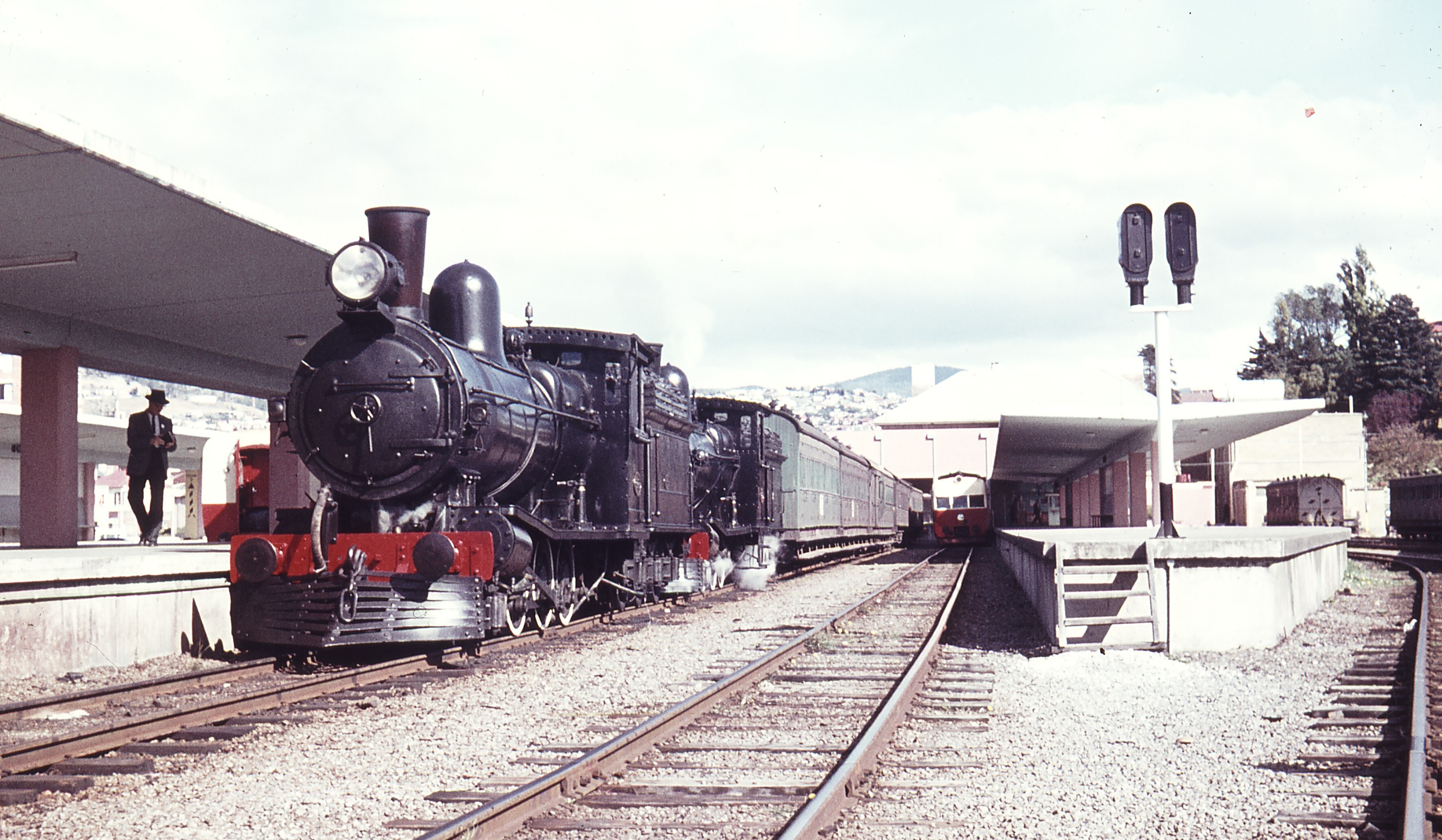
Railway platforms, circa 1960s

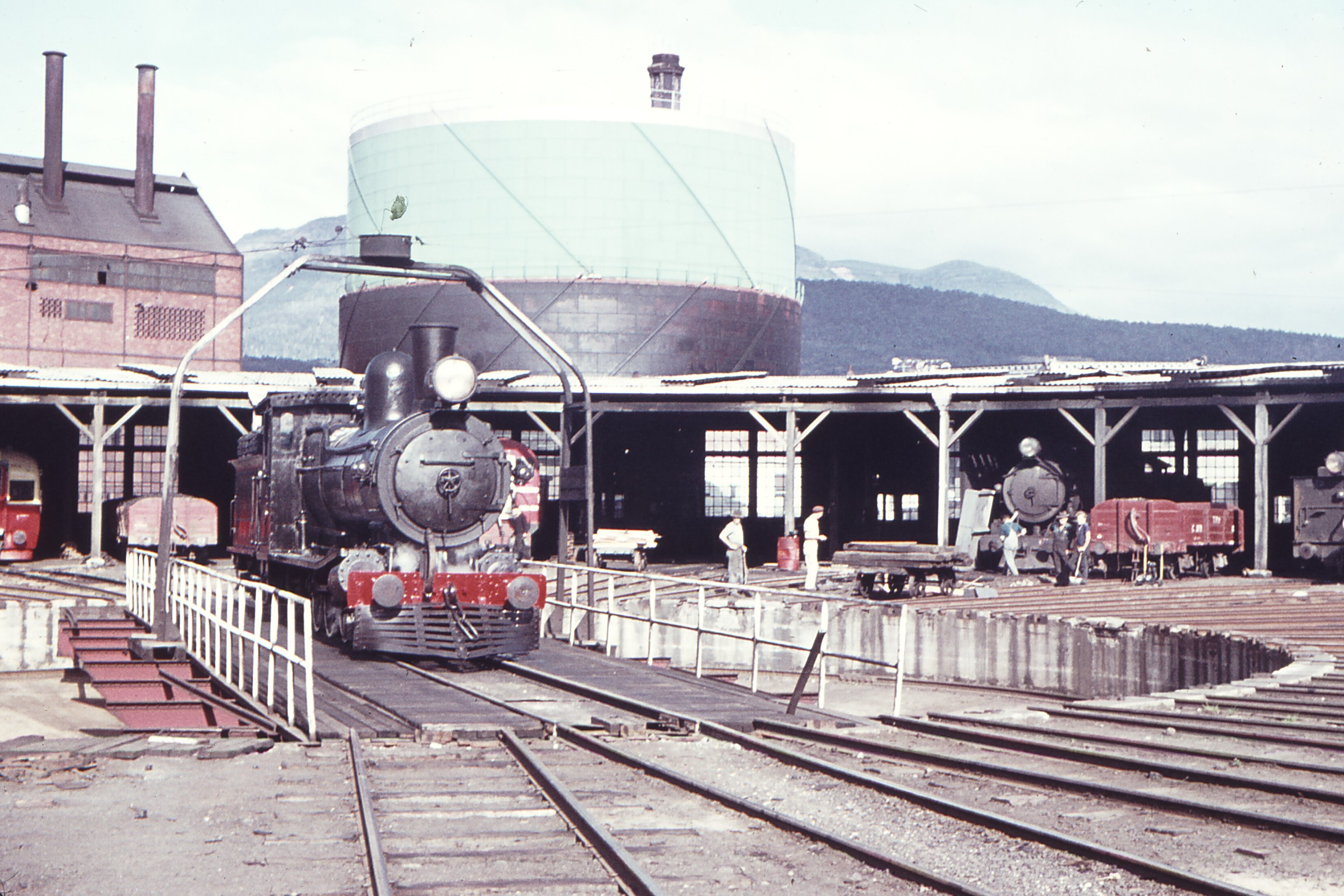
Railway roundhouse with gas holder from the neighbouring Hobart Gas Company precinct

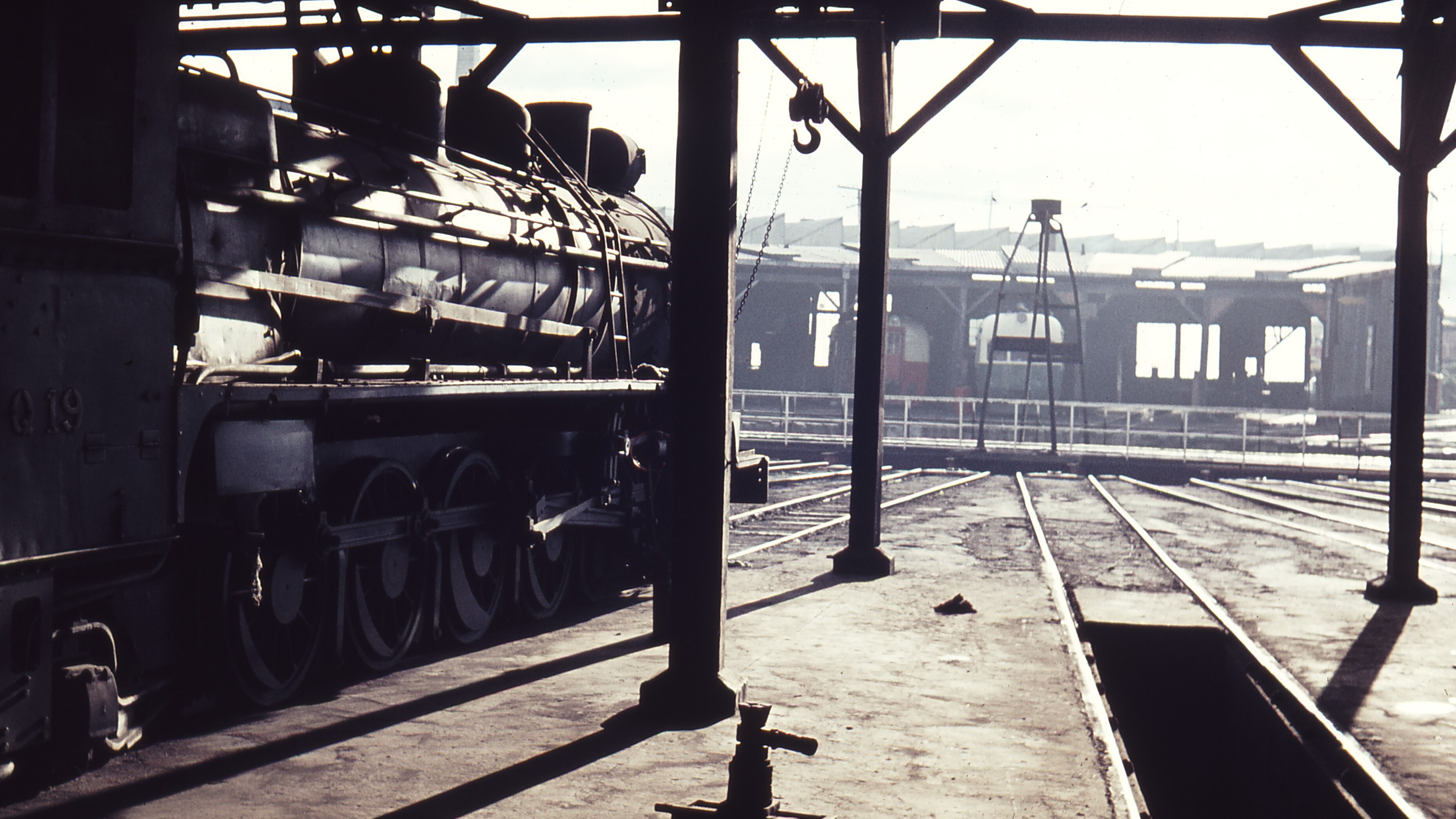
Inside the roundhouse

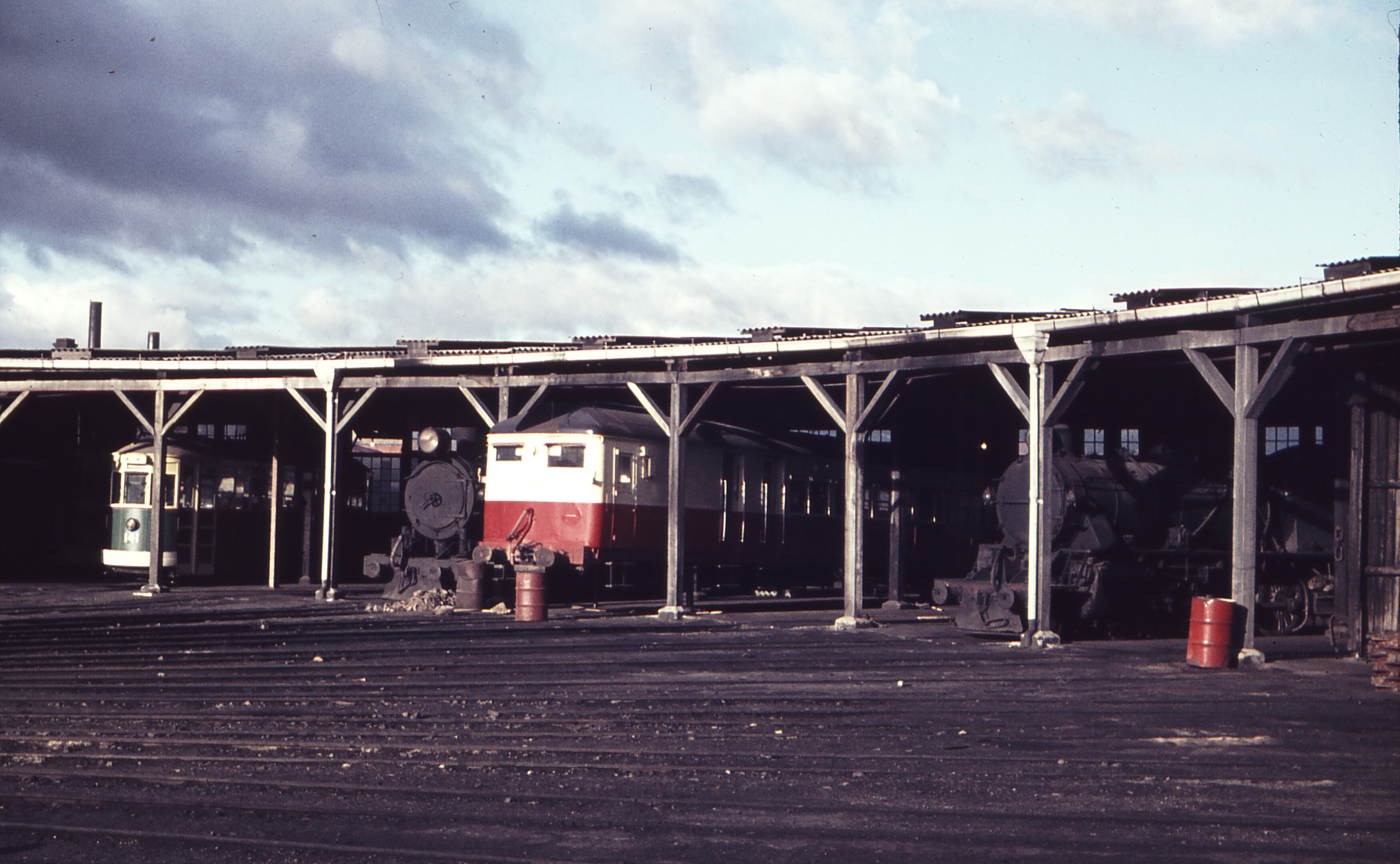
Locomotives stored in the roundhouse

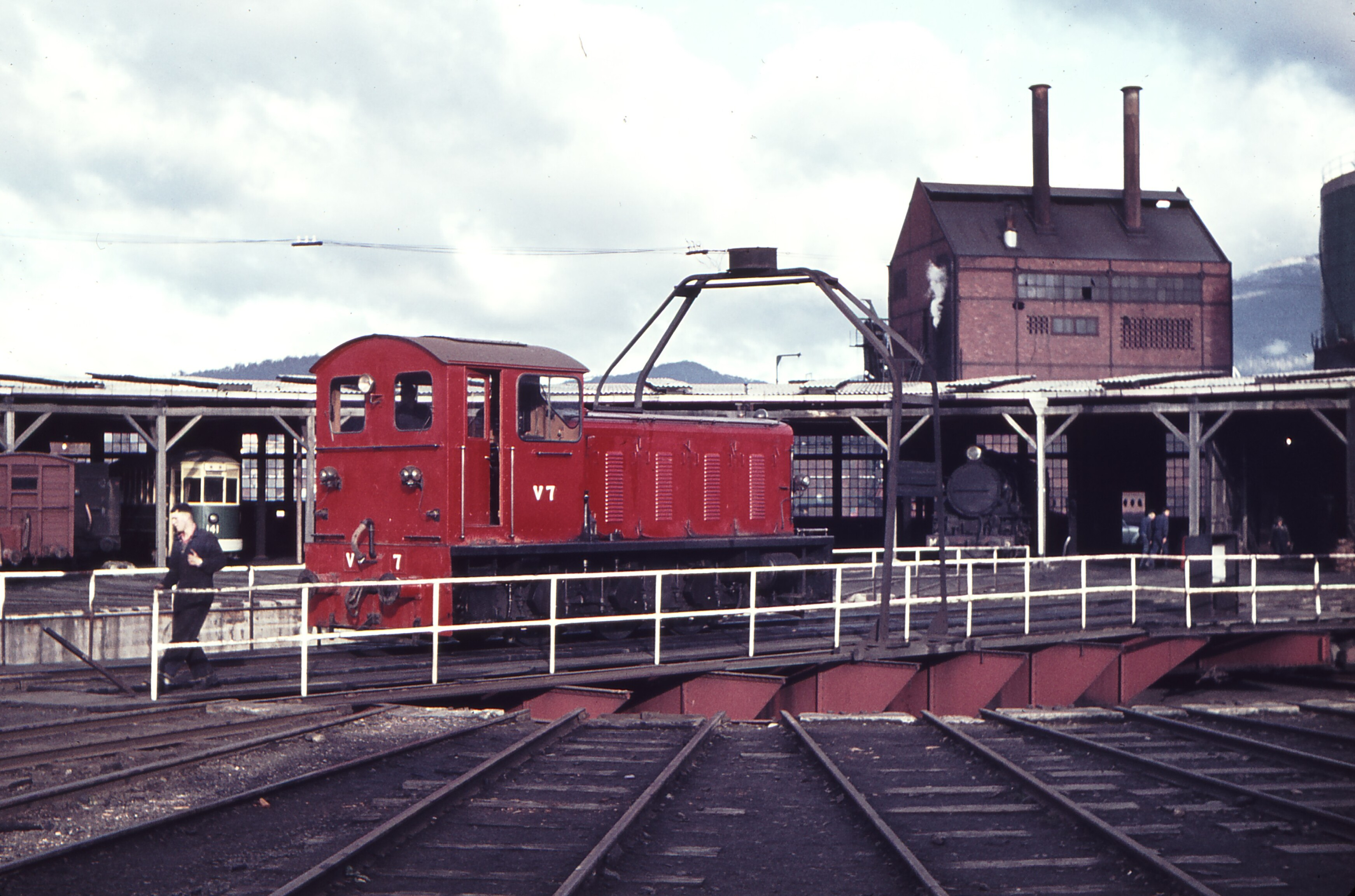
Roundhouse with turntable in use, 1963

== Works consulted ==
- Federated Builders' Association of Australia (12 April 1915), "Hobart Railway Station. Peculiar Government Methods. (12 April 1915)", Building: The Magazine for the Architect, Builder, Property Owner and Merchant, 15 (92), Building Publishing Co.: 35
- "Tasmanian Main Line to Hobart (1 January 1886)", Walch's Tasmanian Almanac (1886), J. Walch & Sons: 195, 1 January 1886
- Matheson, David (23 June 2021). "Tasman Limited". railtram.com.au. Archived from the original on 21 July 2024.
