= Macquarie Point =

Former industrial site

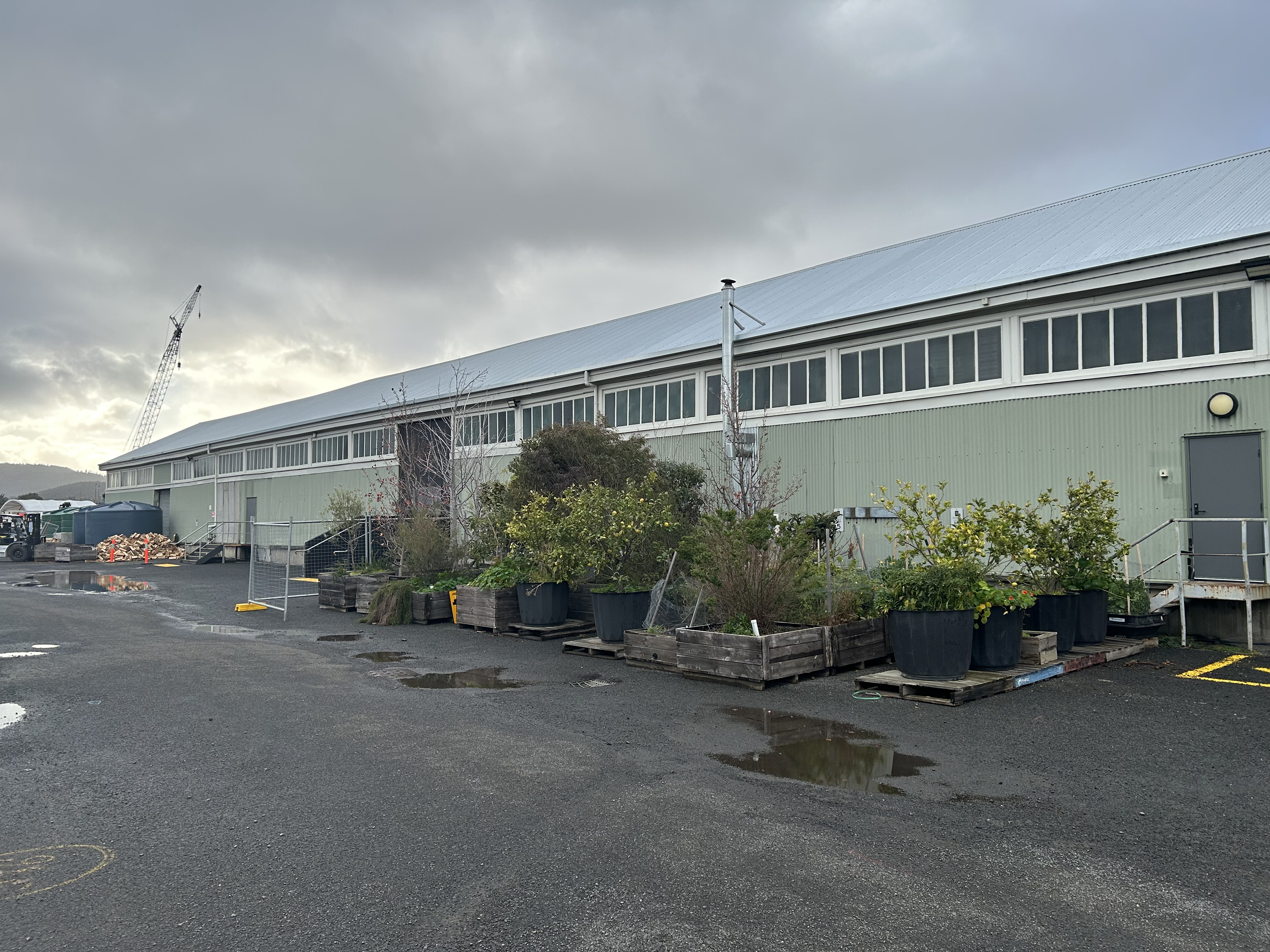
- The Goods Shed at Macquarie Point

- Coordinates: 42°52′46.52″S 147°20′11.66″E
- Country: Australia
- State: Tasmania
- Region: Hobart
- LGA: City of Hobart
- Location: 0 km (0 mi) NE of Hobart CBD

Government
  - State electorate: Clark
  - Federal division: Clark

Area
  - Total: 9.3 km^{2} (3.6 sq mi)
- Time zone: UTC+10 (AEST)
- Postcode: 7000
Localities around Macquarie Point
Hobart railway station	Hobart Cenotaph	Queens Domain
Davey Street	Macquarie Point	Port of Hobart
Federation Concert Hall	Sullivans Cove	Macquarie Wharf No. 2 Terminal

Macquarie Point is a prominent 9.3 ha (23-acre) parcel of land located in central Hobart, Tasmania, Australia bounded by Sullivans Cove, Davey Street, the Hobart Cenotaph, and facilities operated by the Port of Hobart and TasPorts.

== History ==
Historically, the site served industrial and transport functions, including a gas works and infrastructure associated with the Hobart railway station, such as a rail yard, goods sheds, a traction maintenance depot, a railway turntable and a roundhouse. These operations declined following the closure of the South railway line terminal and the relocation of freight activity to the Brighton Transport Hub.

With the land vacated, Macquarie Point was identified as a significant opportunity for urban renewal and reconnection of the city to its waterfront.

== Macquarie Point Development Corporation ==
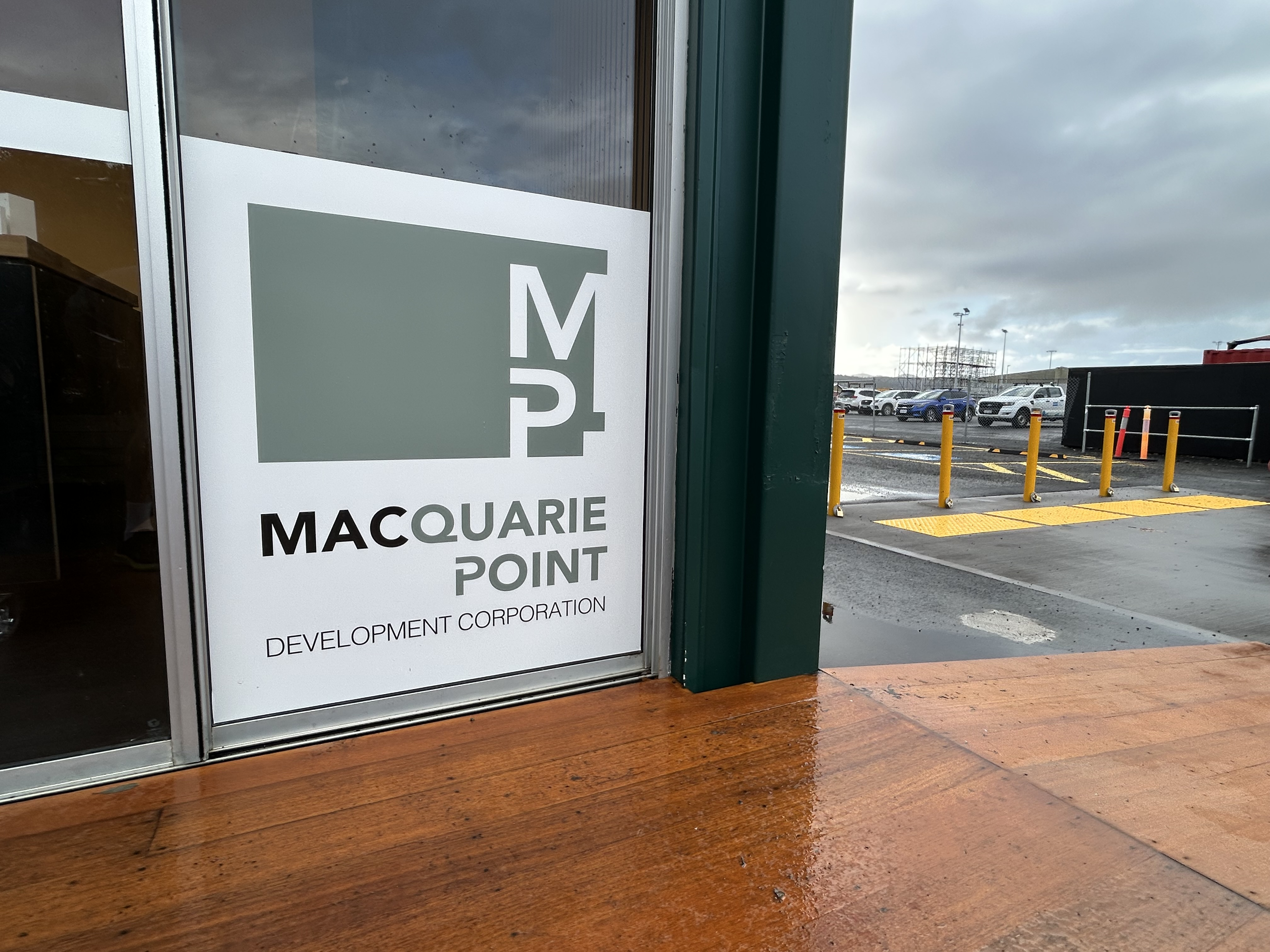
MPDC signage

In 2012, the Tasmanian Government created the Macquarie Point Development Corporation (MPDC) through specific legislation to manage the site's planning, remediation and redevelopment. That same year, Federal Infrastructure Minister Anthony Albanese committed $50 million to support site remediation as part of the Second Gillard ministry.

== Development proposals ==
=== 2014–15 Masterplan ===
The first major development framework was released in 2014–15 by the MPDC, with design input from John Wardle Architects, 1+2 Architecture, Leigh Woolley Architecture & Urban Design, Inspiring Place, Taylor Cullity Lethlean, Village Well and Navire.

This plan envisioned a mixed-use precinct with residential, commercial, cultural, and recreational zones. Key goals included restoring public access to the waterfront and activating the area with new civic spaces. Despite early support, implementation was slow, and by 2016 there were growing concerns over the feasibility and delivery of the plan.

=== Eden Project proposal ===
In 2016, British businessman Sir Tim Smit proposed a local iteration of the Eden Project, focusing on Antarctic and ecotourism themes. The concept included a discovery centre, hotel, cruise terminal, and residential elements. However, after delays and a pivot toward opportunities in Victoria, the proposal was withdrawn in 2019.

=== National Truth and Reconciliation Art Park ===
In late 2016, the Museum of Old & New Art (MONA) released an ambitious proposal for a National Truth and Reconciliation Art Park on the site. Designed by Fender Katsalidis, Rush Wright Associates, and Greg Lehman, the plan featured a fire-and-light installation celebrating over 40,000 years of continuous Palawa culture, alongside a cultural centre, gallery, library, conference centre, and music bowl.

Although the state government expressed in-principle support, cost and delivery timelines became major concerns. The MPDC subsequently initiated a revised strategy in 2017, known as the "Reset Masterplan", to realign priorities.

=== Stadium proposal (2019–present) ===
Amid stagnation in development progress, architect and Hobart Brewing Co. co-owner Don Gallagher in 2019 proposed a multi-use precinct centred on the AFL-standard Macquarie Point Stadium. The unsolicited plan also included a hotel, convention centre, and new hospitality venues.

Although initially outside the endorsed masterplan, the concept gained traction in public discourse. However, the Tasmanian Government reaffirmed at the time that no stadium was included in its official planning documents.
