= Southern Transport Investment Program =

Transport plan in Tasmania, Australia

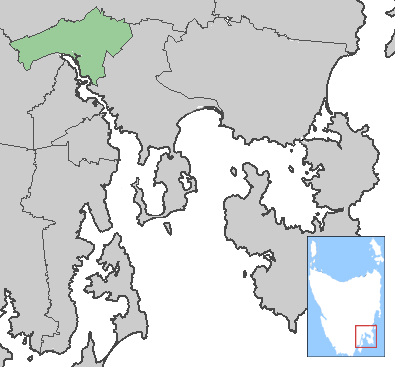
The area of the plan

The Southern Transport Investment Program is a road and rail transport plan for the northern outskirts of Hobart instituted in 2007 by the Government of Tasmania. It outlines most prominently an extensive upgrade of the Midland Highway, including the Brighton Bypass, the Bagdad Bypass and the replacement of the Bridgewater Bridge. The plan also outlines the construction of the Brighton Transport Hub and various rail alignment improvements to the Main North/South railway line.

== Background ==
The original concept was over two decades old and includes both the replacement of the Bridgewater Bridge, and the bypassing of, Brighton, Pontville and Bagdad.

This current section of the Midland Highway is a two-lane road with no overtaking lanes. The speed limit slows to as low as 50 km/h in the area of a Brighton school. Residents of the area have come to dread the almost daily sound of an ambulance speeding past, or a helicopter flying above, towards another crash. Hobart disc jockey and resident of Bagdad, Bob Cooke has said locals live in "mortal fear" driving down Constitution Hill - A semi-mountainous stretch of the highway. In response to some of these concerns, the Midland Highway at Constitution Hill is being upgraded to have oncoming lanes separated by a wire rope safety fence and is expected to be completed in May 2009.

The University of Tasmania is currently spending ten thousand dollars a month subsidising bus travel for students between the Hobart and Launceston Campus. This subsidy started after four students died in a car accident on the Midland Highway in 2006.

== Proposals ==
The proposal has been slow going and plagued by political bickering. In 2001 the Federal Government set aside $100 million towards the replacement of the bridge after the state and Federal governments reached consensus on the replacement bridge's location. In 2003 the Department of Infrastructure, Energy & Resources declared the Bridgewater crossing as the highest priority issue for the National Highway in Tasmania. They also said that a range of upgrading concepts has been developed and were investigating costs for the construction of a new bridge compared to the costs of a refurbishment for the existing bridge.

In 2005 the Federal Minister for Trade Warren Truss said the state government had accepted all funding packages proposed by AusLink for that year except for the replacement of the Bridgewater Bridge. He said this is because the state government does not want that project to proceed

On 30 October 2006 a problem with the lifting span of the Bridgewater Bridge forced its closure for several weeks causing traffic problems for commuters in Northern Hobart. After this incident and the increasing road fatalities on the existing highway the Derwent Valley, Brighton and the Southern Midlands Council started lobbying the state government for the construction of the long-awaited bypass. Shortly after this, on 13 November 2006 the Federal Minister for Roads Jim Lloyd said the Tasmanian Government had taken too long to find a solution to problems with the Bridgewater Bridge. Lloyd said there is $20 million available for a new bridge and the Federal Government is open to approaches for more funding. He said it is unacceptable that Tasmania's Department of Infrastructure, Energy and Resources has spent five years looking at alternatives for the bridge.

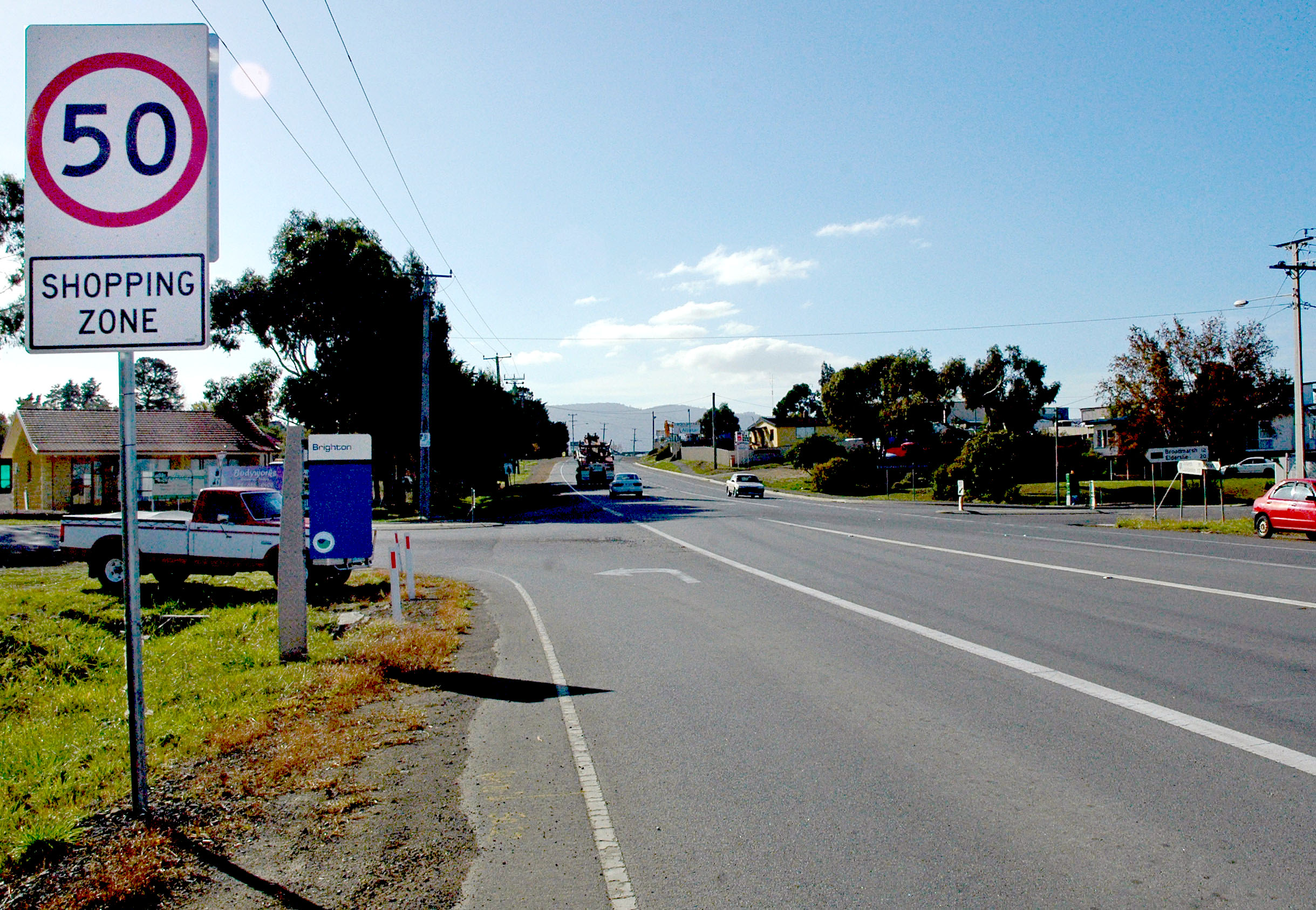
Main Road at Brighton, formerly part of the Midland Highway

During early April 2007, after a ten-year-old girl was killed on the highway, the mayors of the three southern councils proposed a 10-year upgrade of Hobart's northern approaches ending in the replacement of the Bridgewater Bridge. Southern Midlands Council Mayor Tony Bisdee estimated the staged works would cost between $250 million and $300 million and would help the South "catch up in road funding to the North and North-West of the state". Towards the end of April 2007, after five road fatalities on the highway that month the state government drafted plans for a two-lane bypass of Brighton (built over 10 years). The plan involves the following upgrades (in order of completion):

Proposals made by the study
Name	Image	Status	Built
Brighton Bypass		Complete	2012
Bridgewater Bridge replacement		Completed	2025
Bagdad Bypass	—N/a	Planning	—N/a

Minor improvements of the Lyell Highway at the southern end of the Bridgewater Bridge were also proposed.

This new proposal did not include the replacement of the Bridgewater Bridge or overtaking lanes for the new bypass. Mayor Bisdee said that the proposed two lane bypass was inadequate for the needs of the area, and stated that with increasing truck movements in the area, that overtaking lanes were needed or the Swedish One Plus Two model. State Transport Minister Jim Cox confirmed that specific details such as lanes, safety barriers and other safety features had yet to be finalised. Cox stressed the road on the bridge is sound but did say $1.5 million was needed to fix the liftspan.

=== Political problems ===
We have waited far too long for a Commonwealth commitment to southern Tasmania. Since 2000, The Federal government has spent more than $90 million on roads in the north-west and only $10 million on roads in the south.

— Paul Lennon, The Mercury

Former premier Paul Lennon joined the debate, saying that the upgrade—which will bypass some of Tasmania's most neglected and dangerous stretches of highway—was long overdue. He said he along with all other southern Tasmanians wanted to see the national highway upgraded significantly. The former premier also said he hopes the proposed move of the Freight Terminal to Brighton will be a catalyst for federal funds to fix Hobart's northern approaches. The day after making these comments the Lennon accused the Federal government of pork-barrelling in the north and north-west while neglecting deadly roads in the south.

Well, I think when an assessment is made in a few months time that people will draw a conclusion that it is a fair balance. I do remind Mr Lennon that 60 per cent of Tasmania's budget is provided by the Commonwealth already.

— John Howard, The Mercury

In the following days Prime minister John Howard indicated the state's south would get a boost in road funding. However, Howard hit back at Premier Paul Lennon's accusations he has spent up big in north and north-west while neglecting road safety in the south of the state.

The state government had not yet released its plans for the proposed bypass to the Federal government, Lennon said this should not prevent a commitment. He said that the $60 million East Tamar Highway upgrade announced in 2006 had not required a plan.

=== Bridgewater Bridge ===
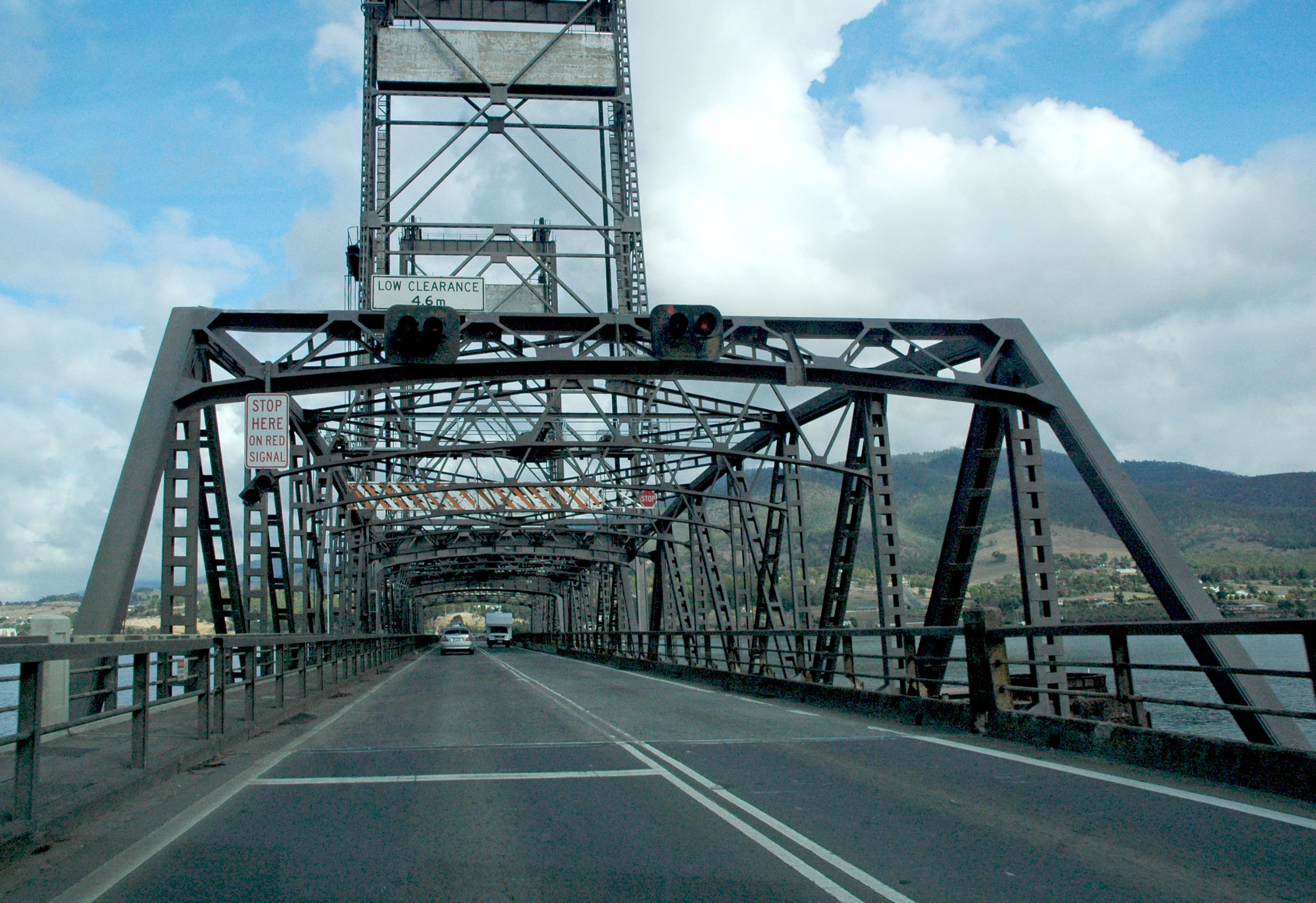
The Bridgewater Bridge

Shortly after this the Lennon government announced that the Bridewater Bridge would be closed indefinitely to boating traffic. They stated the reason for this was the $2 million price tag to fix the lifting mechanism was out of the state government's reach. Infrastructure Minister Jim Cox also verified that taking all of these expenses into account, the bridge cost the tax payer $12,000 each time the bridge wqs lifted. The local boating community expressed anger that the bridge would be closed to boating traffic. Some of the boat users went as far as to say the state government had treated them with contempt. Senator Eric Abetz stated that the governments decision to keep the bridge closed to boating traffic showed it should have pursued a new bridge over the Derwent River. Senator Abetz said the state government had been dishonest with the southern mayors.

We have been told by premiers Rundle, Bacon and Lennon that the bridge was the top priority for road works in Tasmania, it was absolutely vital because the current one did not have a long life left. All of a sudden they (the present state government) came up with an engineer's report which suggested it had another 25 years life in it. Clearly this is wrong. We now have all sorts of problems with that bridge. It's a pity, we could have been two years down the path of building this bridge if the state government and mayors hadn't backed off.
— Eric Abetz

Around the same time, Derwent Valley Mayor Nick Cracknell suggested the state government could be "fudging" figures on repairing the lifting mechanism of the bridge in an effort to convince the public that its repair was too costly. He proposed an independent assessment of bridge.

== Official plan ==
During May 2007 the state government released its long-awaited plan for Hobart's northern approaches. The plan outlines the construction of a $164 million 9.5km four-lane grade separated highway to bypass Brighton. As well as having a continuous 110 km/h speed limit the new road will also have a centre barrier to stop head-on crashes that have caused numerous deaths and serious injuries on the notorious two-lane stretch of the Midland Highway. The five-year plan also includes the construction of a $70 million Brighton Transport Hub to replace the road-rail freight transfer centre at the Hobart railyards. The Bridgewater bridge will get a $12 million repair to make it last until a new bridge can be built as part of the $200 million stage two of the plan, which should happen by 2017. The 12 km Mangalore-Bagdad bypass was to be built as part of stage two from 2011. The big difference to the official plan compared to the government's draft plan released a month earlier is the Bridgewater Bridge. Possibly due to community outrage over the present bridge being closed to boat traffic, the official plan includes its eventual replacement. Stage one of the plan involves:

- In excess of 1million cubic metres of earthworks
- 5 bridge structures including 120m long rail tunnel
- 5 km rail track
- 5 km road
- 25,000m² hardstand area
- Grade-separate interchanges to serve the Brighton Industrial Estate and Brighton township
- Several overpass and underpass structures at road and rail crossings including two rail underpasses for the Main North/South railway line and some realignment of the Main Line railway
- Upgraded roundabout and new roundabout at interchange
- Road and rail infrastructure, including amenities and office buildings
- New services and relocation of existing services
- Service roads and ramps

== See also ==
- Hobart Area Transportation Study
- Transport in Hobart
