= Tasmanian Government Railways R class =

Class of railway locomotives in Tasmania, Australia

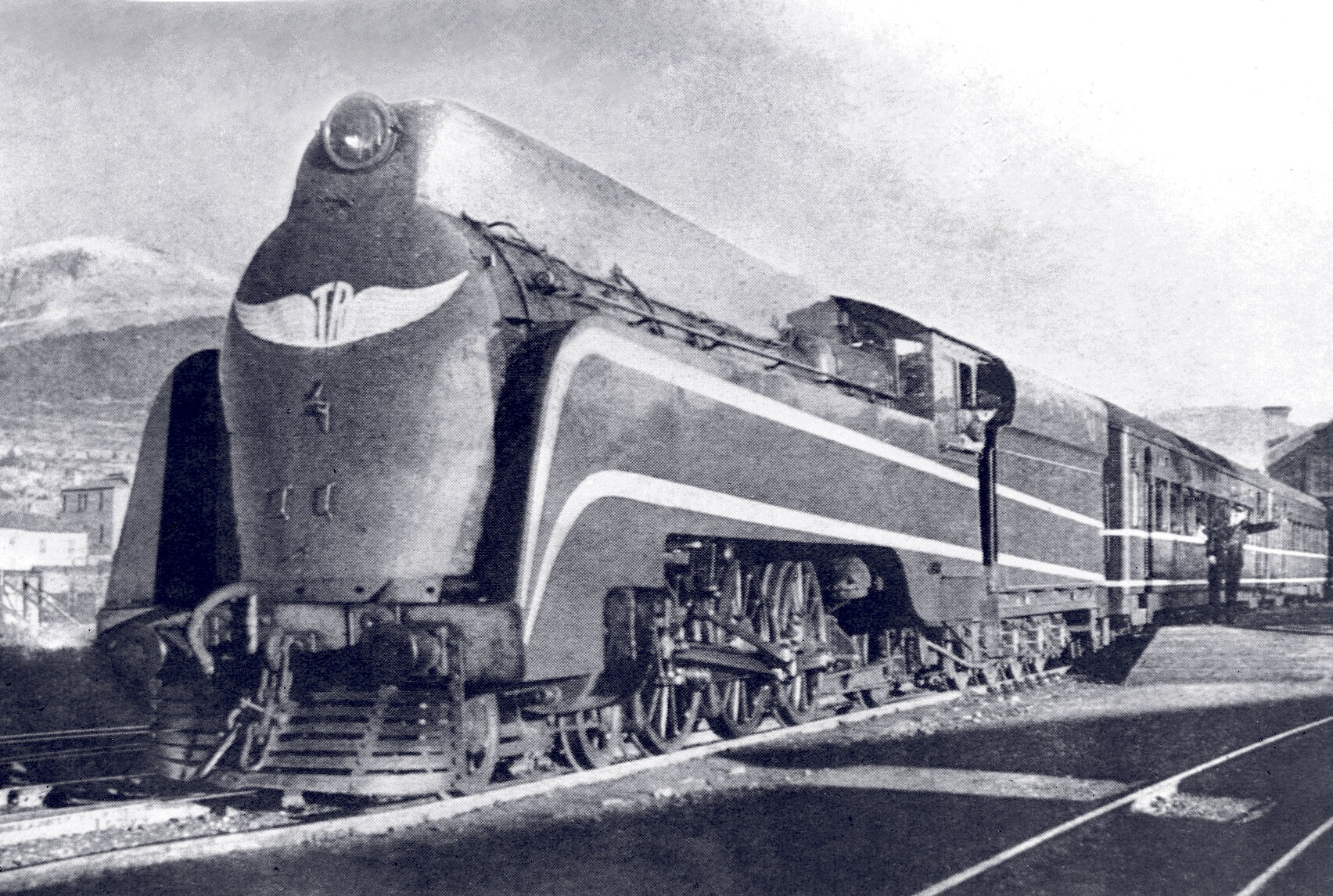
- R class R3 departing Hobart station circa 1938
Type and origin
- Power type: Steam
- Builder: Perry Engineering
- Serial number: 243-246
- Build date: 1923
- Total produced: 4
Specifications
- Configuration
  - Whyte: 4-6-2
- Gauge: 1,067 mm (3 ft 6 in)
- Leading dia.: 2 ft 4 1/2 in (724 mm)
- Driver dia.: 4 ft 7 in (1,397 mm)
- Trailing dia.: 3 ft (914 mm)
- Wheelbase: 27 ft 3 in (8,306 mm) engine, 9 ft 9 in (2,972 mm) coupled, 50 ft 10 1/4 in (15,500 mm) total
- Length: 60 ft 2 1/4 in (18,345 mm)
- Height: 12 ft 3 3/8 in (3,743 mm)
- Axle load: 12 3/4 long tons (13.0 t; 14.3 short tons)
- Loco weight: 58 3/4 long tons (59.7 t; 65.8 short tons)
- Tender weight: 39 long tons (39.6 t; 43.7 short tons)
- Total weight: 97 3/4 long tons (99.3 t; 109.5 short tons)
- Fuel type: Coal
- Fuel capacity: 6 long tons (6.1 t; 6.7 short tons)
- Water cap.: 3,500 imp gal (16,000 L)
- Firebox
  - Grate area: 32.5 ft^{2} (3.02 m^{2})
- Boiler pressure: 160 lbf/in^{2} (1.10 MPa)
- Heating surface
  - Firebox: 134 ft^{2} (12.45 m^{2})
  - Tubes and flues: 1,420 ft^{2} (131.92 m^{2})
  - Total surface: 1,554 ft^{2} (144.37 m^{2})
- Superheater
  - Type: Schmidt
  - Heating area: 320 ft^{2} (29.73 m^{2})
- Cylinders: 2
- Cylinder size: 20 in × 24 in (508 mm × 610 mm)
- Valve gear: Walschaerts
- Valve type: Piston 9 in (229 mm) diameter
- Loco brake: Steam
- Train brakes: Vacuum
Performance figures
- Tractive effort: 23,738 lbf (105.59 kN)
- Factor of adh.: 3.59
Career
- Operators: Tasmanian Government Railways
- Number in class: 4
- Numbers: R1-R4
- Disposition: All scrapped

The Tasmanian Government Railways R class was a class of steam locomotives built in 1923 with a "Pacific" 4-6-2 wheel arrangement.

== History ==
In 1923, the Tasmanian Government Railways took delivery of four 4-6-2 locomotives from Perry Engineering, Gawler, South Australia, as replacements for the A class. They operated on the Western, Derwent Valley, Main and Fingal lines.

In 1938, R3 and R4 were fitted with streamlining similar to the Victorian Railways S class for operation of Hobart to Launceston expresses. They were also painted emerald green with cream stripes to fit the sets of carriages which were in the same livery. The streamlining was removed in the late 1940s. All were withdrawn in 1956/57.

All were scrapped in the early 1960s. One model in HO scale is on display at the Tasmanian Transport Museum
