= Cullity =

Cullity is a surname. Notable people with the surname include:

- Garrett Cullity, Australian philosopher
- Kate Cullity, Australian landscape architect
- Patrick Cullity (born 1987), American ice hockey player
