= Hazell Bros =

Construction company in Australia

- Industry: Construction
- Founded: 1944
- Founders: Donald Hazell; Rowley Hazell
- Headquarters: Hobart, Tasmania
- Area served: Australia
- Number of employees: 700
- Website: www.hazellbros.com.au/

Hazell Bros is a construction company headquartered in Hobart, Australia.

== History ==
Hazell Bros was founded in 1944 by Donald and Rowley Hazell as a transport business in southern Tasmania. In the 1950s, it became involved in earthmoving projects and by the 1970s had entered the construction industry.

In 1986 Hobart Coaches was established taking over the licences and nine buses of Ayers Coach Services with services in the Kingston, Blackmans Bay, Huon Valley, Richmond and New Norfolk areas. In 1999 Hobart Coaches was sold to Metro Tasmania.

In September 2008 Hazell Bros became Nissan's forklift dealer in Tasmania. In August 2010 Hazell Bros acquired Lund Constructions and Lund Plant Hire of Burleigh Heads, Queensland. In February 2011 Hazell Bros acquired Midwest Civil of Ballarat, Victoria.

In February 2024 VEC Civil Engineering was purchased from the Downer Group.

== Notable projects ==
- Brighton Bypass
- Brighton Transport Hub
- Brooker Highway upgrade
- Cattle Hill Wind Farm
- Hobart Airport upgrade
- QuayLink, Devonport
- Studland Bay Wind Farm
- Tarraleah Power Station upgrade
