= Pugh's Almanac =

Annual almanac published in Australia

Pugh's Almanac was an annual almanac published in Queensland, Australia. It provided a guide to Queensland, and information about the events of the previous year and included several directories of commercial and non-commercial organisations.

== History ==
It was founded by Theophilus Parsons Pugh, and published from 1859 to 1927.

== See also ==
- Australian Blue Book
- Walch's Tasmanian Almanac
