= Hobart Coaches =

- Parent: Metro Tasmania
- Commenced operation: 22 September 1986
- Ceased operation: 2008
- Headquarters: Hobart, Australia
- Service area: Tasmania
- Website: www.hobartcoaches.com.au

Hobart Coaches was a bus operator in Hobart, Tasmania, Australia.

== History ==
Hobart Coaches was founded by Hazell Bros to take over the licences and nine buses of Ayers Coach Services with services in the Kingston, Blackmans Bay, Huon Valley, Richmond and New Norfolk areas. In 1990, it purchased Ayers remaining operations increasing the fleet 23.

It operated services from Hobart to St Helens, Queenstown and Port Arthur.

In 1990, Hobart Coaches was granted approval for an express service from Hobart to Burnie via Launceston in competition with Redline Coaches. The express service was operated under the Intercity Coaches banner. By 1992 it was operating the Gray Line franchise in Hobart. In 1996, the touring arm was rebranded Tiger Line.

In 1999 Metro Tasmania purchased part of Hobart Coaches from Hazell Bros with 11 vehicles with suburban services to Kingston and Blackmans Bay and interurban services from Hobart to New Norfolk and Richmond. In 1999 the St Helens, Queenstown and Port Arthur services were sold to Tassielink Transit.

In March 2007, the Hobart to Colebrook via Richmond and Campania service was taken over by Tassielink Transit. In 2008 Metro Tasmania retired the Hobart Coaches brand.
