= Tasmanian Government Railways A class =

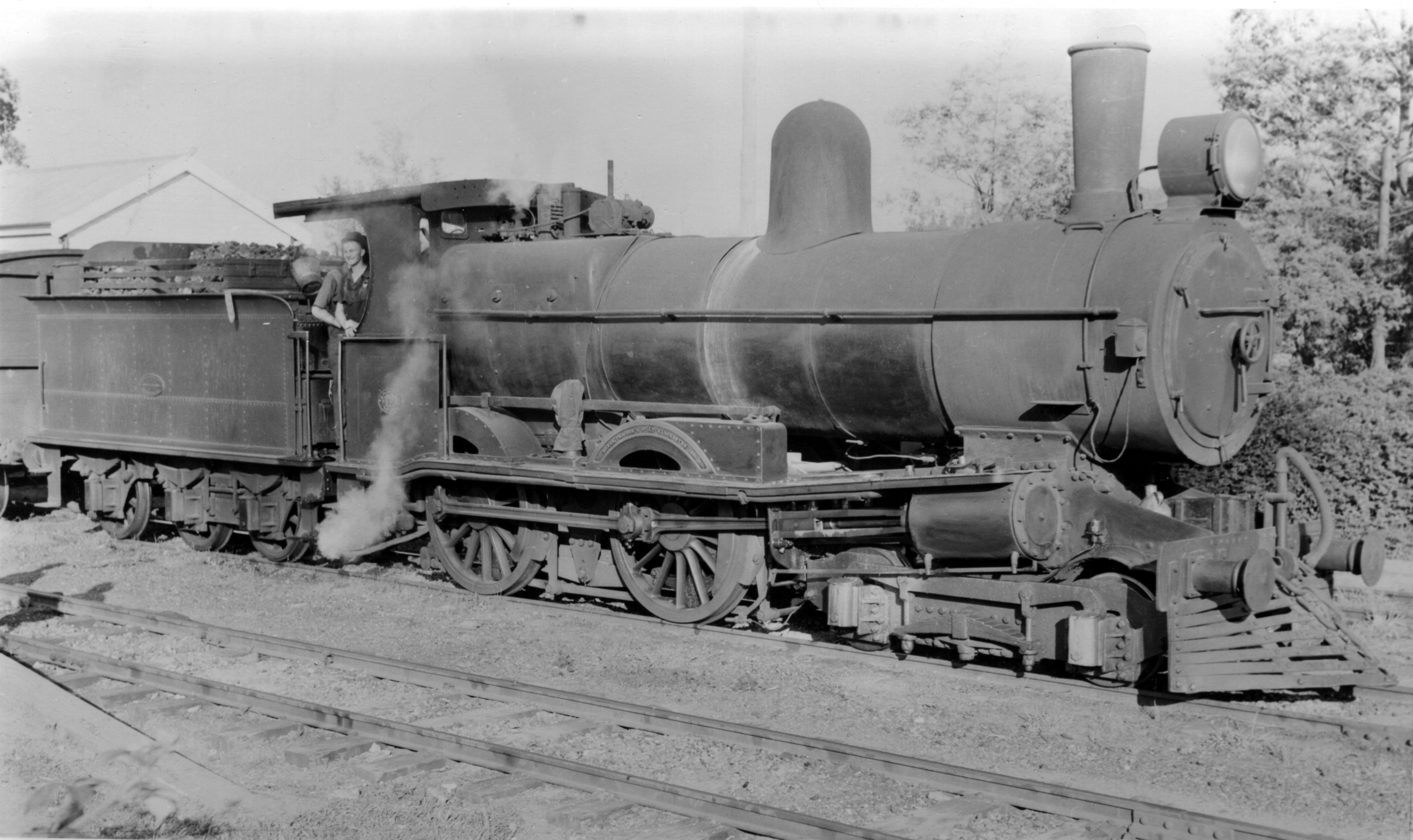
Type and origin
- Power type: Steam
- Builder: Beyer, Peacock & Company
- Serial number: 3390-3393, 3505, 3506, 4309, 4310
- Build date: 1892-1902
- Total produced: 8
Specifications
- Configuration
  - Whyte: 4-4-0
- Gauge: 1,067 mm (3 ft 6 in)
- Driver dia.: 4 ft 7 in (1,397 mm)
- Total weight: 53 long tons 0 cwt (118,700 lb or 53.9 t)
- Fuel type: Coal
- Boiler pressure: 150 lbf/in^{2} (1.03 MPa)
- Cylinder size: 15.5 in × 22 in (394 mm × 559 mm)
Performance figures
- Tractive effort: 11,532 lbf (51.30 kN)
Career
- Operators: Tasmanian Government Railways
- Numbers: A2-A9
- Preserved: A4
- Disposition: 1 preserved, 7 scrapped

The Tasmanian Government Railways A class was a class of 4-4-0 steam locomotives operated by the Tasmanian Government Railways.

== History ==
In 1892 the Tasmanian Government Railways took delivery of six A class locomotives from Beyer, Peacock & Company, Manchester. A further two followed in 1902. In 1908, A2 and A4 were rebuilt with Belpaire boilers and enlarged fireboxes, five more followed between 1927 and 1932, with the last converted in 1946. They were relegated to lesser duties following the arrival of the R class in 1923. All were withdrawn in the 1950s after the X class entered service. Seven were scrapped in 1956 with A4 plinthed in Launceston City Park. In August 1990, it was acquired by the Don River Railway.
