= Riverline (Hobart) =

Proposed light rail system in Hobart, Tasmania, Australia

- Artist's impression of the light railway

Overview
- Locale: Hobart, Tasmania
- Transit type: Light rail
- Number of lines: 1

Technical
- System length: 26 km (16 mi) (Johnston proposal); 14 km (8.7 mi) (Business case); 8 km (5.0 mi) (McKim proposal)
- Track gauge: 1,067 mm (3 ft 6 in)

Riverline, also known as the Northern Suburbs Railway, is a proposed light rail system that would have traversed the southernmost section of the South railway line, through the northern suburbs of Hobart, Tasmania.

The proposed line was first mentioned in 2007 when the State Premier, Paul Lennon, announced that a new dedicated transport hub would be constructed on Hobart's northern fringe. The completion of this transport hub in 2014 left the southernmost section of the railway line vacant. While the intermodal operations were moved to Brighton, the intention was to maintain a working port for Hobart and therefore the new arrangement will need to accommodate the occasional freight train.

The original concept was similar in length to the Gold Coast Light Rail system, except this project would have been constructed along an already present rail corridor (similar to Sydney's Inner West Light Rail) which had the potential to save considerable capital costs.

Despite strong public support, the future of the proposed light rail suffered from to a lack of political will. While the major political parties gave in principle support to the development (dependent on federal funding), only the Tasmanian Greens made a firm commitment to ensure its completion. Tasmanian Greens leader Nick McKim made an election commitment to divert funding away from the state's roads if necessary to ensure the first stage was completed.

== History ==
In conjunction with the Main Road, Hobart's northern suburbs have been developed around the South railway line - The two transport corridors are on a near parallel trajectory. Following the end of operations by trams in 1960, trolleybuses managed the city's public transport which in turn were replaced by conventional buses in 1964. The low-density population of Hobart has caused the bus timetables being planned on a low-frequency, high-penetration basis - Bus routes are often lengthy, and can take a long time to reach their final destination, as they attempt to service the widely spread-out suburbs. This has contributed to Hobart having the second lowest public transport patronage in Australia and as a result is very much a car orientated city.

The Brooker Highway was opened in stages from 1961 to alleviate traffic congestion on the Main Road. In 1965 a transportation study was released offering a set plan on constructing and upgrading Hobart's Highways. While this transport study was seen as more of a "highway plan" rather than a "comprehensive transport plan, it did provide clear guidelines for the Brooker Highway including grade separation and additional lanes. However these guidelines have not been followed for the southern portion on the highway. With annual average daily traffic of 48,000, the Brooker Highway is currently below the acceptable levels of service and congestion issues are expected to worsen significantly over the next 20 years with the Highway already approaching its designed capacity. While at present, the Brooker Highway is considerably less congested than in other states during peak hours, it is more congested off-peak than roads in Queensland and Western Australia, and almost as congested as those in New South Wales. It is thus a busy road by any Australian standard.

The South railway line ceased operation on a permanent basis by freight trains when Toll Holdings relocated its intermodal operations from the Hobart Railyards to the Brighton Transport Hub in 2014. As a result, traffic on the Brooker Highway is expected to increase. When announcing the construction of the Brighton Transport Hub, Premier Paul Lennon stated that when complete the Southern Railway Line – south of the Intermodal facility – would no longer be used on a permanent basis. He spoke of the possibility of the railway line opening up to commuter traffic. In 2008, The Australian Institute of Architects and the Planning Institute identified the South Line as an ideal route for an express O-Bahn style bus.

== Proposals ==
In 2009, Ben Johnston, a local engineer and rail enthusiast, founded an organisation known as the Northern Suburbs Rail Action Group and proceeded to release a detailed proposal for the corridor. It was to be a zero-emission, electric/battery rail transportation service that traverses the South railway line starting at the City (Mawson Place) and passing New Town, Moonah, Glenorchy, Berriedale, Claremont, Granton and Bridgewater on its way to Brighton. Additionally, there were also many attractions in close proximity to the proposed light rail line, including the Tasmanian Museum & Art Gallery, Hobart Cenotaph, Royal Hobart Showground, Tattersalls Park, Derwent Entertainment Centre, KGV Oval, Tasmanian Transport Museum, Museum of Old & New Art and Cadbury's Chocolate Factory. In order to retain the existing intercity cycleway, some stations would have passing loops and recharging facilities to allow trains to travel in both directions on the single track and batteries to be recharged whilst passengers embark/disembark.

=== Business case ===
In 2010, a community advisory panel was created for the purposes of assisting the creation of a business case study. A business case undertaken by Acil Tasman was published in 2011. The conclusions included (but were not limited to):

- Considerable work would need to be done on the track to make it suitable and safe for passenger use.
- The last three stations on the proposed line (Granton, Bridgewater and Brighton) were deemed to be unviable as part of the proposal.
- Either diesel or overhead electric traction would be suitable, but battery power is likely to involve higher risks. With five vehicles, the cost of rolling stock would be roughly $25 million.

Following the release of the business case, the Northern Suburbs Railway Action group withdrew from the Light Rail Community Advisory Panel due to what Ben Johnston described as a "fundamentally flawed passenger demand analysis" limiting the proposal to Claremont. He also expressed concern that Transport Minister, Nick McKim was backflipping on key election promises by supporting the adaptation.

=== Political process ===
In 2011, the Tasmanian Government's Infrastructure Australia submission included a $213 million Brooker Highway upgrade wishlist. This was submitted in the absence of any submission for the Northern Suburbs Light Rail, cost at $100 million – less than half the price of the highway upgrades. The government was urged to make a submission for the railway.

With Federal and state elections looming, the Northern Suburbs Railway received tri-partisan support from the major political parties in early 2013. Federal Denison MP, Andrew Wilkie called on the Liberal and Labor parties to each commit $100 million to the project during Parliament. Soon after, The Tasmanian Government announced the creation of a high-powered taskforce to push the case for a light rail link through the city's northern suburbs. Transport Minister Nick McKim stated that he had ordered a new business case for the link, which he wants to put before the Federal Government's funding process by May. However, McKim also said he would be pushing for a Hobart to Glenorchy link, rather than the proposed Hobart to Bridgewater line. He said this was because the route would increase the cost-to-benefit ratio, making it easier to attract critical federal funding. Prominent local businessman, David Walsh even weighed into the debate stating that the proposed light rail should extend beyond Bridgewater and into Gagebrook. Walsh said it took an hour to travel by bus from the far northern suburbs to the CBD, which was too long. He added that his support for the railway was a matter of social justice.

The most recent proposed route pursued by the state government commenced at Mawson Place and ended in close proximity to the Museum of Old & New Art, within the suburb of Berriedale. Proponents of the light rail in 2014 called on the state government to extend the transport corridor to North Hobart.

The fate of the light rail is unknown after the feasibility study was scrapped as part of the Abbott government's 2014 Australian federal budget.

In 2018, there were considerations of trackless trams being a part of the light rail concept.

A 2023 stadium proposal reignited conversation about transport options, including the northern suburbs corridor. A state review of local government areas prompted the City of Hobart Lord Mayor to mention light rail as a potential trade for amalgamation with Glenorchy.
