= Australian Blue Book =

The Australian Blue Book was an Australian almanac and national reference book published in Australia between 1942 and 1950.

The 1942 (first) edition was edited by A. Moorhead, and the 1946–48 (second) edition by W. J. Beckett another part of the book was a supplement published in 1950. Beckett was involved in a court case at one point.

The book was published in Sydney, and contained comprehensive photographs of people in administrative positions, as well as material from Australians involved in the second World War. It had extensive listings of all the local government areas in Australia at the time, with names of officials and descriptions of the areas.

It was not related in any way to the other titles with state names, such as the Western Australian Blue Book of the 1890s.

== See also ==
- Pugh's Almanac
- Walch's Tasmanian Almanac
