= Tasmanian yearbook =

Tasmanian year book was the annual review of statistics collected for Tasmania. It was a companion volume to Walch's Tasmanian Almanac, and produced between 1967 and 2000. It was issued by the Commonwealth Bureau of Census and Statistics Tasmanian Office, later known as the Australian Bureau of Statistics office.It had regular special articles in each edition which were considered definitive in their writing and approach.

== Special articles ==
No.11 (1977)

- Townsley, W.A. The Tasmanian main line railway company (originally presented in 1956 to the Tasmanian Historical Research Association) pp. 6 – 22. along with photographs

== Publishing details ==
No. 1 (1967)-no. 27 (2000) - Hobart, Tas. : Commonwealth Bureau of Census and Statistics, Tasmanian Office, 1967-2000. ISSN 0082-2116 (1987 not published)
