= Kinetic Tasmania =

Tasmanian bus company

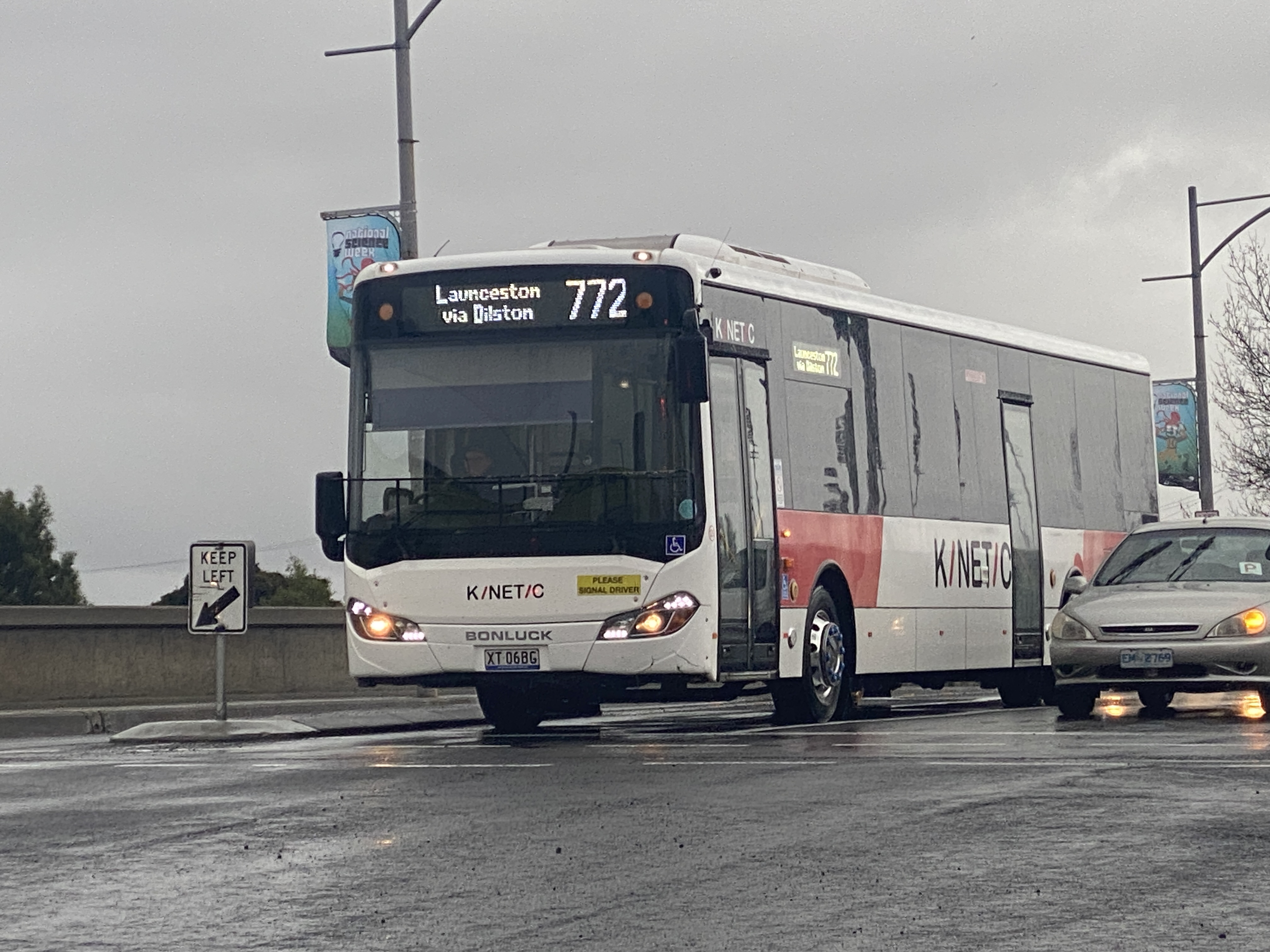
- Bonluck on the Victoria Bridge, Launceston in August 2025
- Formerly: Redline Coaches; Tasmanian Redline Coaches
- Parent: Kinetic
- Founded: July 1963
- Headquarters: Launceston
- Service area: Tasmania
- Fleet: 251 (August 2025)

Kinetic Tasmania, formerly Redline Coaches, is one of Tasmania's largest coach operators. It is a subsidiary of Kinetic.

== History ==
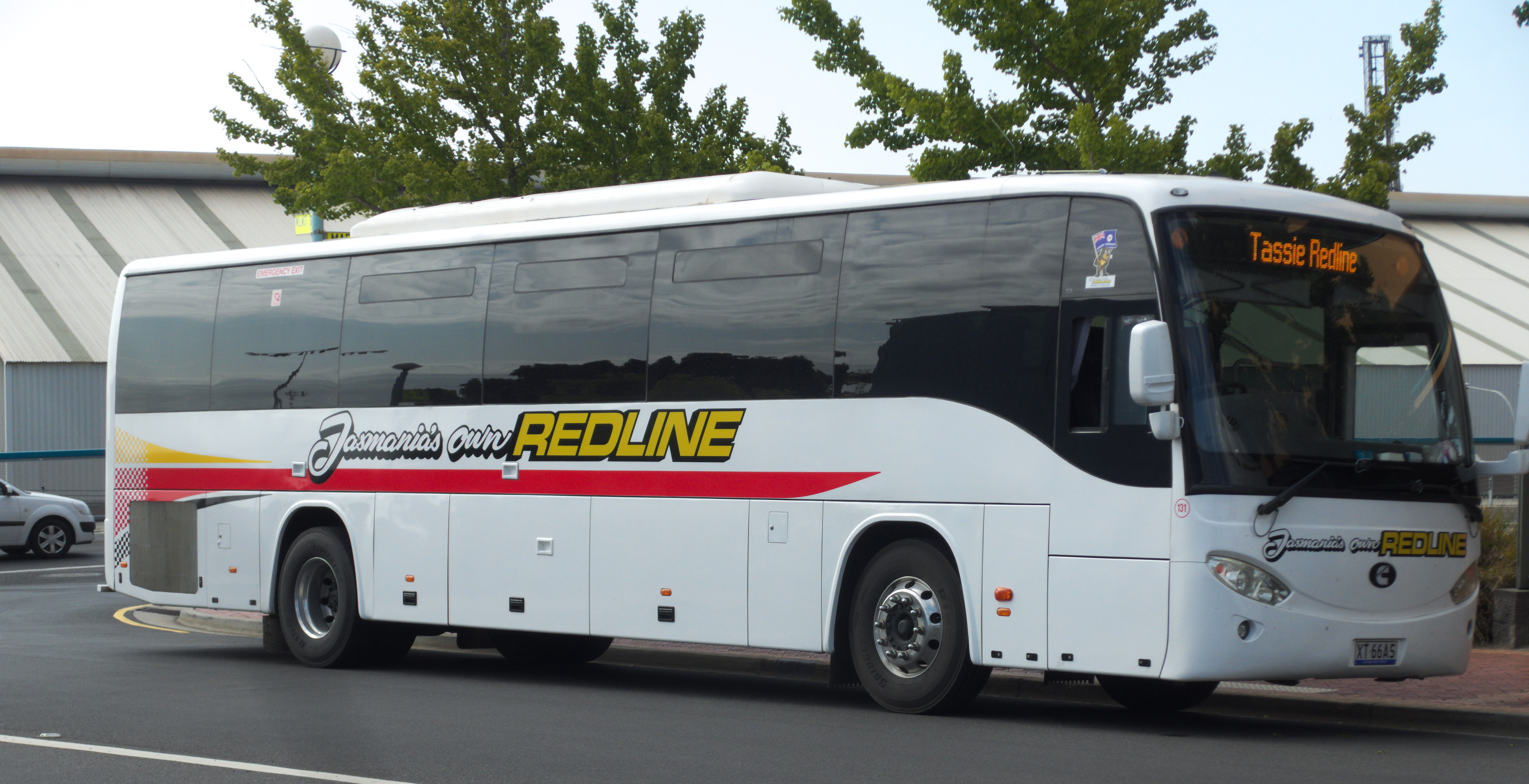
Redline liveried Higer in Burnie in January 2020

Redline Coaches and the Larissey family business dates back to 1929 when Percy and Stella Larissey commenced trading in Cressy. They were later joined by Percy's son Frank to become P Larissey & Son. Redline Coaches was formed in July 1963, when Frank Larissey purchased Sutton's Motor Service, Launceston with four buses and renamed it Redline Coaches.

In January 1965, Redline Coaches began operating ten-day tours of Tasmania connecting with the Empress of Australia at Bell Bay under contract to the Tasmanian Government Travel Bureau. Through a number of takeovers, Redline developed a network of services in north-east Tasmania. In 1975 the business of Young's Coaches was purchased and a contract picked up from Gippsland Educational Tours saw it conduct tours throughout mainland Australia. By this stage, the fleet consisted of 19 vehicles. Further expansion came with it being appointed as a sub-contractor for AAT Kings, Ansett Pioneer and Australian Pacific Tours.

In May 1980, Redline purchased Tasmanian Coach Lines, who operated stage services throughout the state, with 17 vehicles. The combined operation was renamed Tasmanian Redline Coaches. In the next few years many other long-distance operators would be taken over with the fleet growing to 110 by 1992.

Following the withdrawal of services by Ansett and TAA in 1982, Tasmanian Redline commenced airport services in Hobart and Launceston. In 1982 Cape Country Coaches and Circular Head Motors were taken over. In October 1983 Tasmanian Redline Coaches diversified into commuter operations purchasing Sorell Coaches.

In September 1990, the long-distance market was deregulated and Hobart Coaches began competing on some of Tasmanian Redline's more profitable routes. In February 1998 Tasmanian Redline was rebranded Redline Coaches.

Tasmanian Redline also operated a freight business using a combination of luggage space on its coach services and dedicated vans. In September 1999 Redline took over Toll Ipec's Tasmanian freight operations.

In 2009 Redline acquired the business of Smith's City to Surf Coaches servicing the Dodges Ferry region. In June 2018, the Hobart airport service was sold to SkyBus.

Redline was acquired by Kinetic in April 2021. Kinetic expanded its Tasmanian operations with several acquisitions: Sainty's Bus Service in February 2022, Mersey Bus & Coach Services in March 2022, East Tamar Bus Lines in September 2022, O'Driscoll Coaches in March 2023 and Crawn Motors in June 2024.

In late 2022, the Redline brand was retired in favour of the Kinetic brand. In August 2026 Tassielink Transit was purchased with 39 vehicles.

== Fleet ==
As of August 2025, the fleet consisted of 251 buses and coaches.
