= Bagdad Bypass =

Former proposed bypass in Tasmania

Bagdad Bypass Tasmania

General information
- Type: Highway
- Length: 16 km (9.9 mi)
- Route number(s): National Highway 1

Major junctions
- North end: Midland Highway (National Highway 1, Dysart)
- South end: Brighton Bypass (Midland Highway, National Highway 1)

Location(s)
- Major settlements: Bagdad

Highway system
- Highways in Australia; National Highway • Freeways in Australia; Highways in Tasmania

The Bagdad Bypass was a proposed bypass of the Midland Highway, through Bagdad, Tasmania. The road was proposed to initially constructed as a two-lane highway with extra earthworks undertaken to facilitate future duplication of the bypass. The road was proposed be constructed as a grade separated highway and was designed to seamlessly connect to the Brighton Bypass.

In 2010, the Department of Infrastructure, Energy and Resources released two potential alignments for public comment. Neither design existed wholly within the existing proclaimed corridor and ultimately, a combination of the two designs was chosen to minimize intrusion into townships while at the same time keep construction costs to a minimum by diverting the future highway away from areas that would require significant earthworks.

In 2017, a central turning lane through Baghdad was completed instead.

== See also ==
- List of bypasses in Tasmania
