= Tassielink Transit =

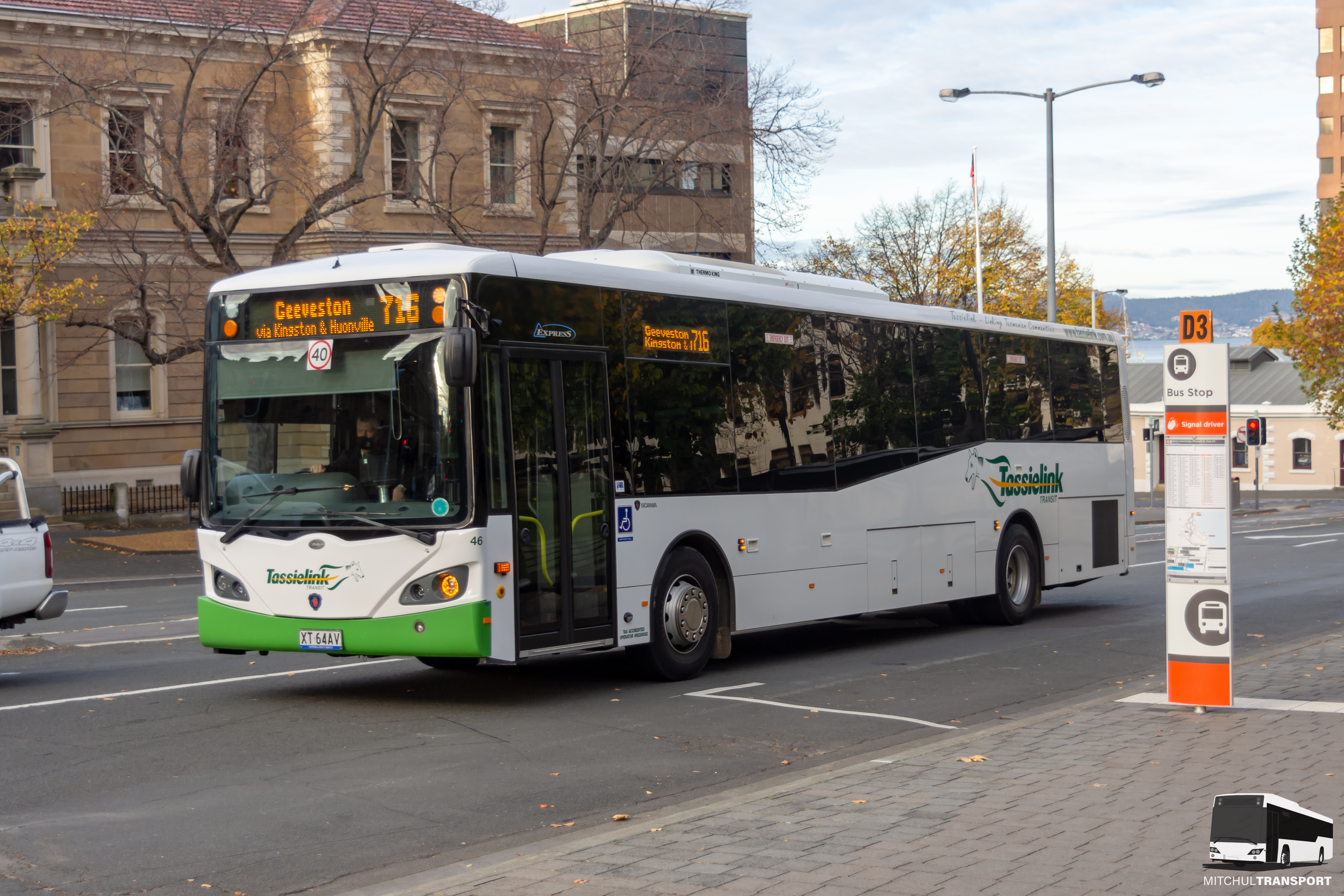
- Express Coach Builders bodied Scania K310UB in May 2022
- Headquarters: Derwent Park
- Service area: Tasmania
- Fleet: 41 (October 2025)
- Website: www.tassielink.com.au

Tasslielink Transit is a bus and coach operator in Hobart and Launceston, Tasmania, Australia.

== History ==
In July 1987, Melbourne-based Invicta Bus Services (John Usher and family) purchased the business of Morse's Bus Service, Devonport. The business in Tasmania was eventually split off from Invicta in 2001, while it remained owned by the Usher family.

The businesses of Tag Along Tours, Hobart, and Mountain Stage Line, Launceston along with a Devonport to Cradle Mountain service were purchased. These were combined under the Tasmanian Wilderness Travel brand.

In 1997 TRC Travel was purchased. In 1999 services from Hobart to St Helens, Queenstown, Port Arthur and Huonville services were purchased from Hobart Coaches. In October 2005 the service between Cressy, Longford and Launceston was purchased.

In March 2007 the Hobart to Colebrook via Richmond and Campania service was taken over from Hobart Coaches. In 2008 Metro Tasmania retired the Hobart Coaches brand.

In September 2020, managing director Shane Dewsbery, who was with the business for 27 years at the time, took over ownership of the company with his family. In August 2026, the business was sold to Kinetic Tasmania.

== Fleet ==
As at October 2025 the fleet consisted of 41 buses and coaches.

== Depot ==
In June 2012 Tassielink Transit opened a new depot in Derwent Park.
