= J. Walch and Sons =

Australian publisher

J. Walch and Sons was an Australian publisher, founded in Hobart, Tasmania, by Major James Walch and several of his sons.

== History ==
Major James William Henry Walch (died 1852) and family (Note: The party consisted of the Major, his wife Eliza, their children Arthur, James, Charles, George, Jane, Eliza, and Catherine, also his sister, the widow Catherine Man.) left England for Hobart, Tasmania on the barque Royal Saxon, arriving in November 1842, and was attached to Her Majesty's 54th Regiment. On 1 January 1846, he and his second son James Henry Brett Walch (died 5 November 1897), took over a bookseller's and stationer's shop established by James Tegg, at the corner of Liverpool and Elizabeth streets. henceforth known as "Walch's corner".

An associated business, Walch Bros and Birchall, was founded to carry on a similar business in Launceston, later becoming A. W. Birchall and Sons Pty Ltd.

In 1859 they published a 64 by 48 inches (1.6 m × 1.2 m) map of Tasmania.

In 1861 they opened a stationery store with bookbinding and account book workshop headed by James Walch in Macquarie Street. In 1862 he began publishing the Tasmanian Almanac, (Note: The Launceston Branch of Tasmanian Family History Society Inc. has produced an Index to Walch's Tasmanian Almanacs.) better known as Walch's Red Book. James was succeeded as editor by George D'Emden (died 1940); retired 1938.

In 1873 they purchased Downing's store in Davey Street for a warehouse and in 1876 removed their Elizabeth Street premises to the rebuilt establishment at the corner of Elizabeth and Liverpool streets, whose second floor housed a pianoforte and artworks display room.

James Walch died in 1897,

The company was restructured some time around 1921, when its public pronouncements were first signed "J. Walch and Sons Pty Ltd".

== Competition ==
In 1877 Thomas Lloyd Hood (died 1 May 1904), a Walch employee, opened a shop in competition with his ex-employer on a corner of Elizabeth and Liverpool streets, over the way from "Walch's corner", establishing his own landmark, "Hood's Corner". In 1897 he opened new premises at 85 Elizabeth Street. He opened shops in Zeehan and Queenstown.

== Family ==
Sons of James William Henry Walch and Eliza Walch include:

- Arthur Walch, died in India while a member of the British Army.
- James Henry Brett Walch (22 October 1828 – 5 November 1897) married Eliza Watchorn (1830–1858) on 8 January 1852. They had two children; Eliza died shortly after.

- Major (of 54th Regiment) James William Henry Walch (1855 – 3 August 1936) was a lawyer.
- Lizzie Emmely Walch (1858–1944) married James Lyne on 15 July 1880
He married again in 1859, to Jane Crosby (1837–1828) in 1859. Their large family included:
- Arthur Crosby Walch (14 March 1862 – 21 May 1944) of William Crosby and Co.

- Dr Christine Walch MA MB ChM ( – ), two more daughters
- Major Dr James Henry Brett Walch ( – ) married Joyce Unst Johnson on 8 September 1925

- Alice Jane Walch married Carmichael Imlach Lyne in 1885
- William Crosby Walch (died 11 April 1916)
- Richard Crosby Walch (1865 – 30 August 1915) worked for J. Walch and Sons; managed the Macquarie St. branch from 1897 to 1915.

- G. A. Walch worked for J. Walch and Sons
- C. E. Walch worked for J. Walch and Sons

- George Crosby Walch (c. 1867 – 6 September 1940) married Marie Hannaford, was farmer at Devonport
- Percival Crosby Walch (c. 1873 – 13 July 1948) worked for J. Walch and Sons; appointed managing director in 1915.
- Lieut Col. (of Royal Field Artillery) John Crosby Walch DSO (19 June 1875 – 22 June 1961) married Aileen May Von Stieglitz in 1905

- Charles Edward Walch (8 May 1830 – 24 March 1915) in 1853 became business partner with brother James. He was editor of Walch's Literary Intelligencer
- George Walch was surveyor in India, later senior public servant
- Garnet Walch (1843–1913) was the youngest son of Major Walch.
