= Walch's Tasmanian Almanac =

Almanac produced in Hobart by J Walch and Sons

Walch's Tasmanian Almanac was an almanac produced in Hobart by J. Walch and Sons from the 1850s until 1980.

It had a range of variant titles over the time that it was published, but was commonly known as Walch's Almanac.

Also known as the "red book", it included detailed information about Tasmania for the current year, and all regions and towns of the state.

It is a valuable resource of historical information about Tasmania.

Extensive use of the information has been collated and indexed by and for genealogical societies.

== See also ==
- Tasmanian year book
- Australian Blue Book
- Pugh's Almanac
