= Brighton Transport Hub =

Intermodal transport hub in Hobart, Tasmania

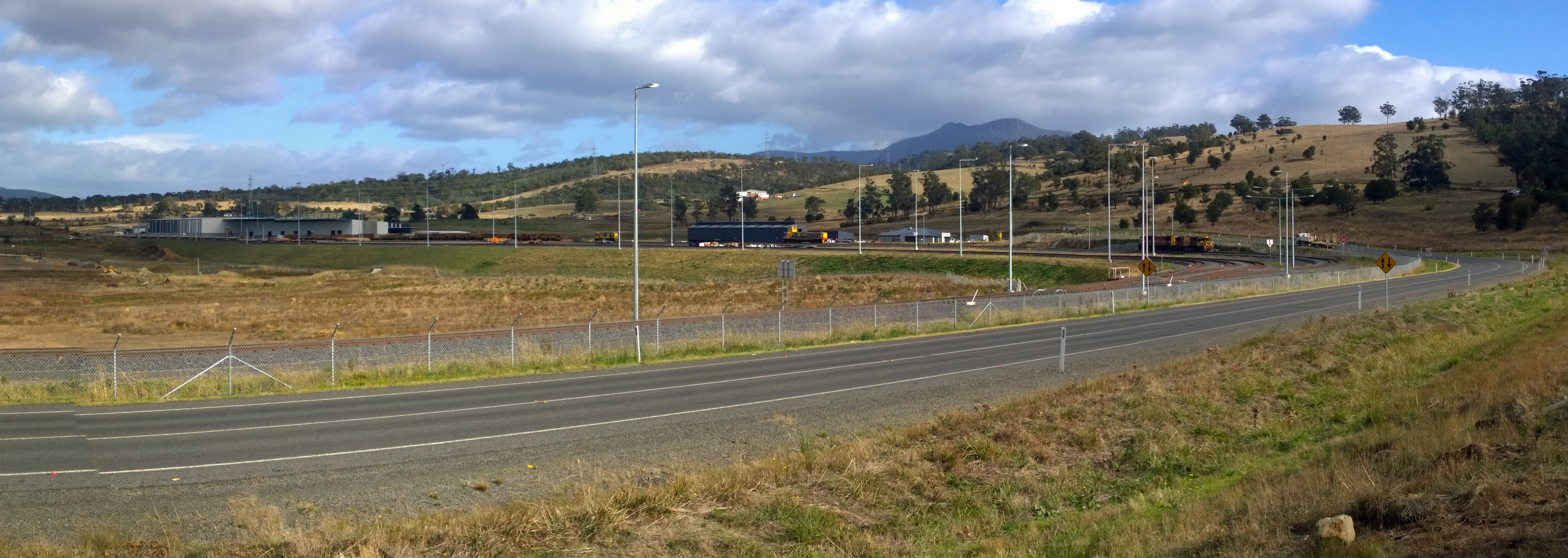

Location
- Location: Brighton, Tasmania
- Coordinates: 42°42′52.16″S 147°13′46.55″E

Details
- Built: 30 July 2014
- Operated by: TasRail; Toll Group
- Type of harbour: dry port
- Size: 50 hectares
- No. of platforms: 2
- Rail lines: South Line
- Rail gauge: 1,067 mm (3 ft 6 in)
- Street access: Brighton Bypass
- Truck types: B-Double

The Brighton Transport Hub is an intermodal transport hub in the northern Hobart suburb of Brighton operated by TasRail.

== History ==
The idea of building the Brighton Transport Hub (BTH) to replace the outdated and congested TasRail intermodal terminal at Macquarie Point in the Hobart city centre was included in the Southern Transport Investment Program of 2007.

Macquarie Point featured many short holding tracks that prevented trains being moved as a single continuous vehicle which caused extensive shunting throughout loading operations. These delays occurred in addition to long travel times south of Bridgewater, where the main South railway line followed the River Derwent through Hobart's northern suburbs, across 21 level crossings which required slow train speeds.

The Macquarie Point site featured a poor quality surface with uneven levels which created difficulties for the loading, unloading and manoeuvring of freight across the site. The site configuration did not allow for efficient truck consolidation and deconsolidation and added to the delays borne by transport companies waiting for containers to be unloaded. It closed on 22 June 2014.

The BTH site, 25 kilometres north of Macquarie Point, was chosen as the preferred site of the inland port because of its close proximity to the Midland Highway and the South railway line. It allows freight to be easily transferred between road and rail transport and enable efficient movement of freight between Tasmania's southern and northern ports.

The BTH was built in conjunction with the Brighton Bypass from 2009 by a John Holland / Hazell Bros consortium. In December 2012, Toll Group announced it would relocate from Macquarie Point to the BTH. It opened on 30 July 2014.
