= South Line, Tasmania =

Railway line in Tasmania, Australia

South Line
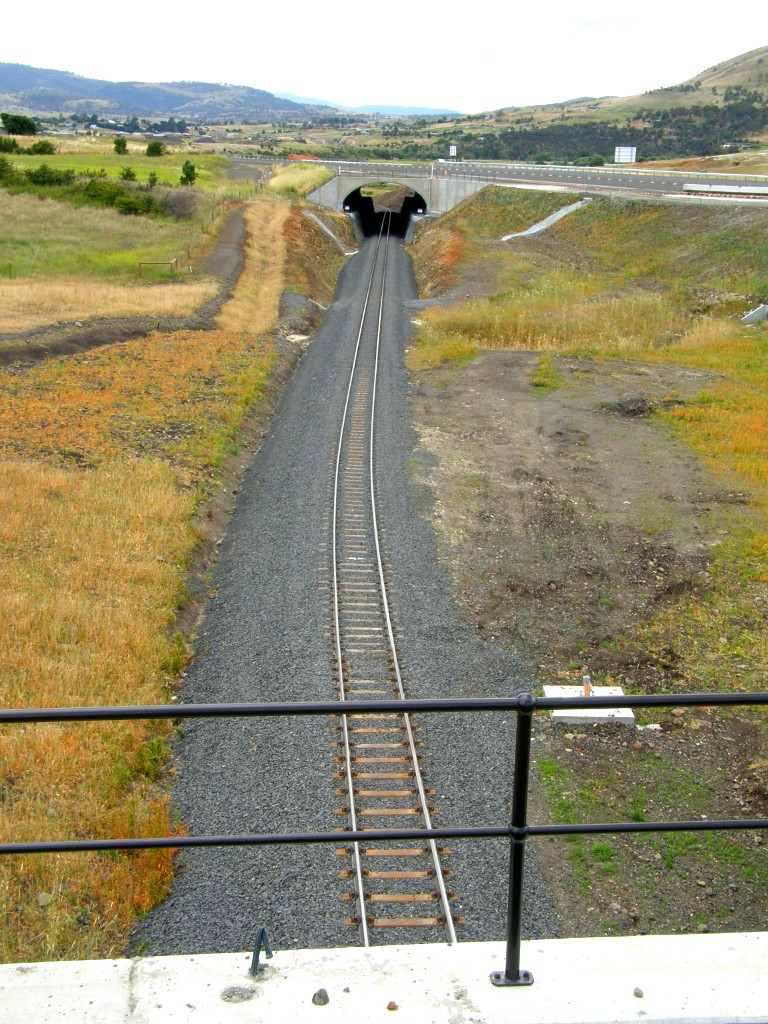
- The South Line, travelling north under the Brighton Bypass

Overview
- Owner: Government of Tasmania
- Termini: Hobart railway station; Bell Bay Line Western Line

Service
- Type: Heavy rail
- Operator: TasRail

History
- Opened: 1876

Technical
- Track length: 199.1 km (123.7 mi)
- Track gauge: 1,067 mm (3 ft 6 in)

The South Line, also known as the Main Line and sometimes the North/South Line or the North–South Line, is a rail corridor connecting Hobart to the northern ports of Tasmania. The Railway Line was built by the Tasmanian Main Line Company.

The Remains of the South Line on the Causeway at Granton where the Midland Highway formly went on

== History ==
When building the railway line the company had limited finances, the line was built to the 1,067 mm (3 ft 6 in) Narrow Gauge and included long sections of steep gradients and sharp curves. The final eighteen kilometres of the route from Western Junction to Launceston used the existing Broad gauge alignment of the Launceston and Western Railway, with a third rail being laid for use by the narrow gauge trains. The Railway Line was officially opened on 1 November 1876. As Tasmania has a very competitive road transport industry and a modern road network, only limited deviations have been built in the Main line's 125-year history. Although the line still follows the original alignment, the standard of the track has improved by the use of heavier rail welded into long lengths, steel sleepers and better ballast. The line remains in service, and sees multiple freight trains most days, these generally operating Burnie to Boyer and Burnie / Launceston to Hobart and return.

The last freight train left Hobart Station on 22 June 2014; afterwards the purpose-built Brighton Transport Hub became the terminus of goods services.

Following the completion of the Brighton Transport Hub, the section of rail line through inner Hobart fell into disuse. Serious constraints in the road network, along with low-frequency bus services, have led to ongoing discussion of introducing light rail to Hobart. It would make use of the rail corridor, creating a new express route to Hobart. The proposed light rail system has been known as both Riverline and the Northern Suburbs Railway.

Heritage passenger trains returned to the line in 2023, operated by the Tasmanian Transport Museum following support from the Tasmanian Government.

== Route ==
The line commences at the former Hobart intermodal Terminal at Macquarie Point, on Hobart's waterfront. The line follows the western side of the River Derwent to Bridgewater, where the river is crossed by the former Bridgewater Bridge and Causeway. From here the line runs generally north east through easy country to Rekuna (between Tea Tree and Campania). From here the often steep and/or twisty climb commences, with little respite for train crews until Rhyndaston and its 955m long tunnel is passed, some 28 km later. The descent from near Parattah is not as steep or severe as its southern counterpart, although does still include a number of difficult sections including the Tin Dish and Nala deviations which were constructed in the 1930s to lessen gradients, although at the expense of more additional curvature in some sections. North of Antill Ponds, the line roughly parallels the Midland Highway as they both follow the agriculturally rich valleys formed by the Macquarie and South Esk rivers. The South Line finishes at Western Junction near Evandale, where it connects with the Western Line.

== See also ==
- Rail transport in Tasmania
