= Kate Cullity =

Australian landscape architect

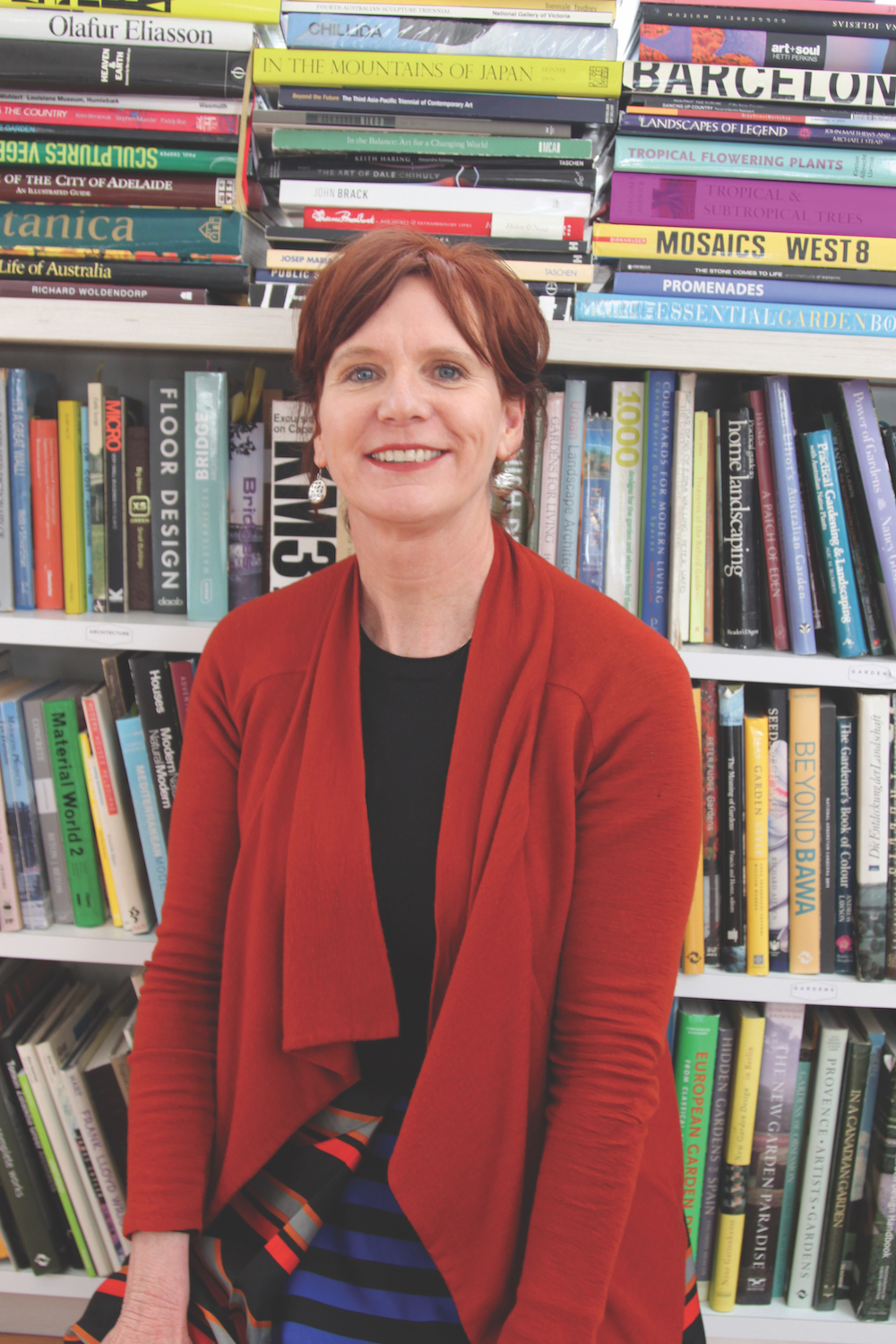
Kate Cullity

Kate Cullity is an Australian landscape architect and founding director of TCL (Taylor Cullity Lethlean), a landscape architecture and urban design practice based in Melbourne and Adelaide, Australia.

== Early life ==
Kate Cullity grew up in Perth, Western Australia. She received a Bachelor of Science, majoring in Botany, from the University of Western Australia in 1977, and later a Diploma of Education, also from the University of Western Australia, in 1979.

== Career ==
Her career began as a biology high school teacher before she moved from Perth to Melbourne in 1982 and commenced studying for a Master of Landscape Architecture at the University of Melbourne in 1985. In 1986, she worked for the then Victorian Public Works Department in the landscape architecture division. From 1987-1989 she designed and constructed residential gardens. In 1989, she met Kevin Taylor while working in the offices of architect Gregory Burgess.

In 1990, Cullity and Taylor founded their landscape architecture practice Kevin Taylor and Kate Cullity Pty Ltd, later renamed to Taylor and Cullity. Their first major project was the Box Hill Community Arts Centre in Melbourne’s eastern suburbs. In 1995, Cullity and Taylor relocated to Adelaide, maintaining a Melbourne studio headed by Perry Lethlean, who later became the company’s third director. The company developed into one of Australia’s most well-known and awarded landscape architecture firms, employing around thirty landscape architects across its Adelaide and Melbourne studios. The company has received many awards and international notoriety with the design of the Australian Garden in Cranbourne, Victoria.

Kate Cullity is particularly respected for her private garden designs in Australia and culturally-interpretive exhibits at garden festivals in France, Canada, and Germany.

Cullity completed a practice-based PhD from RMIT University in 2013.

In 2014, she became an Adjunct Associate Professor at the University of Adelaide and a Fellow of the Australian Institute of Landscape Architects in 2016.

== Notable projects ==
- Cultivated by Fire, IGA International Garden Festival, Berlin, Germany, 2017
- Redevelopment of Victoria Square, Adelaide, 2012
- Adelaide Airport Plaza, Adelaide, 2012
- Seeing the Woods for the Trees, University of NSW, 2007
- The Australian Garden, Cranbourne, Victoria, 2006
- Eucalyptus Light and Shadow, Metis International Garden Festival, 2005
- Fire Stories, Chaumont – sur- Loire Garden Festival, France, 2004
- Taylor and Cullity Garden, Adelaide, 2003
- Redevelopment of North Terrace, Adelaide, 2002
- Uluru Kata Tjuta Aboriginal Cultural Centre, 1993
- Box Hill Community Arts Centre, 1990
