= Brighton Bypass =

Road bypass in Tasmania, Australia

Brighton Bypass Tasmania
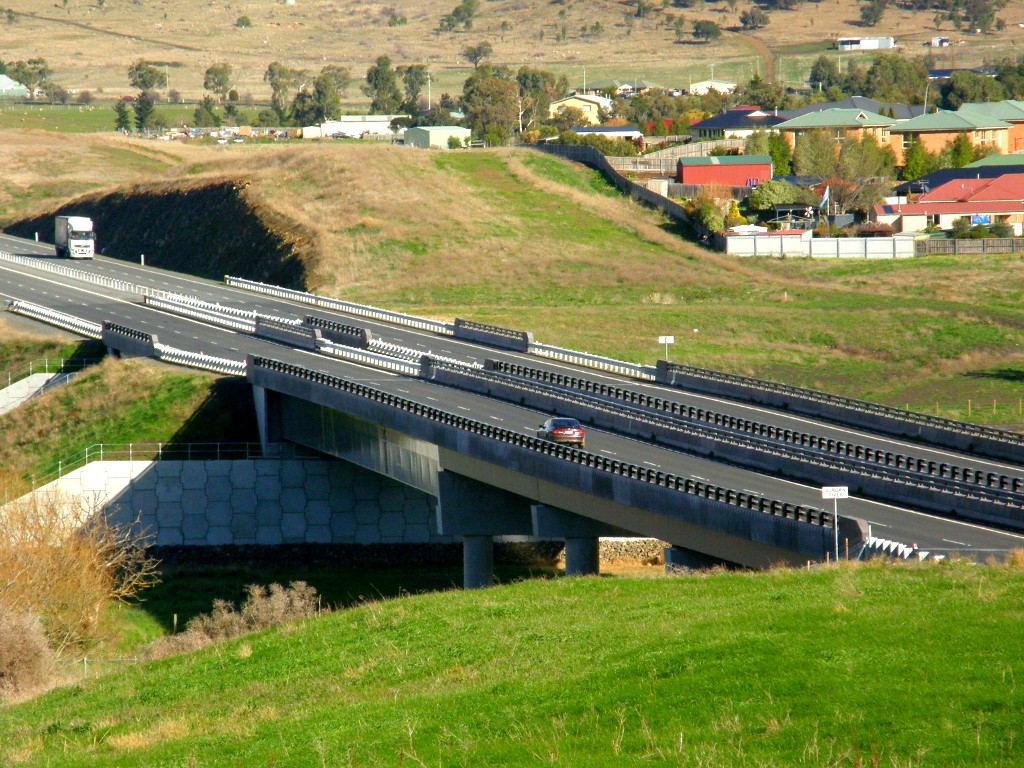

- Coordinates: 42.7325987°S 147.2372159°E (South end); 42.6731224°S 147.2602403°E (North end)

General information
- Type: Highway
- Length: 9.5 km (5.9 mi)
- Opened: 2012
- Route number(s): National Highway 1 (Bridgewater–Pontville)

Major junctions
- South end: East Derwent Highway (Bridgewater Roundabout)
- Tea Tree Road for full list see Exits
- North end: Midland Highway (Pontville Roundabout)

Location(s)
- Region: Hobart
- Major settlements: Brighton, Pontville

Highway system
- Highways in Australia; National Highway • Freeways in Australia; Highways in Tasmania

The Brighton Bypass is a A$191 million north/south bypass of the Midland Highway diverting traffic away from the northern Hobart satellite suburbs of Brighton and Pontville. Construction of the 9.5 km federally funded dual carriageway started in April 2009, and was opened on 12 November 2012.

== Route description ==
From a roundabout at the East Derwent Highway in Bridgewater, the bypass heads north as a controlled-access route. 400 to 800 metres (0.25 to 0.50 mi) north, near the southern edge of Brighton are separate northbound and then southbound interchanges with side roads, for access to the Brighton Transport Hub and nearby properties. After another one and a half kilometres (0.93 mi), the route veers to the north-east, and there is a trumpet interchange connecting to the bypassed section of Midland Highway. Skirting around the developed area of Brighton, the bypass crosses the Jordan River, and curves back to the north to a diamond interchange with Tea Tree Road. It continues north out of Brighton before curving back west to rejoin Midland Highway at a roundabout.

== History ==
The road that preceded the bypass was constructed in the early 19th century to facilitate communication between the north and the south of Tasmania. During the majority of that period Hobart inbound and outbound freight was always transferred via the Port of Hobart or the rail line. The motivation to construct the bypass was demonstrated 20 years ago, when freight in the Port of Hobart declined in favour transporting cargo to the ports to the north of the state. The Southern Railway Line had become outdated due to years of poor maintenance and was no longer an efficient alternative to road transport.

=== Planning ===
In 2007, the Lennon government released the Southern Transport Investment Program, a comprehensive Transport study which marked a clear plan and timetable for constructing the bypass. The bypass is designed as a fully grade separated dual carriageway Highway from the Bridgewater roundabout to just north of Pontville. The sweeping Bypass has been designed to be safe and provide a high level of service. Completion of the bypass also facilitates a seamless connection to the Brighton Transport Hub and provided an opportunity in its construction to realign the south line in certain sections. After intense lobbying on behalf of the State government and councils involved, the construction of the bypass became a Federal election issue, with both major parties pledging financial support towards its construction.

=== Construction ===
In January 2009 the Rudd Government approved 10.5 million dollars to start excavation work on the Bypass, with the state government describing it as "the biggest infrastructure project in southern Tasmania". The new dual carriageway road will be built concurrently with the $79 million southern transport hub. The project was fast-tracked as part of the Federal Government's economic stimulus package. Funds from the Rudd Government are paying for the Brighton bypass, while the Tasmanian government is funding the road and rail freight transport interchange at Brighton.

Construction commenced in April 2009 - a month early. During May 2010, Lara Giddings announced the opening of Glenstone Road. Constructed as the Brighton Transport Hub Link Road, the road has detoured the traffic flow around the Midland Highway in the area of the Brighton Industrial Estate to enable construction of the bypass in that area.

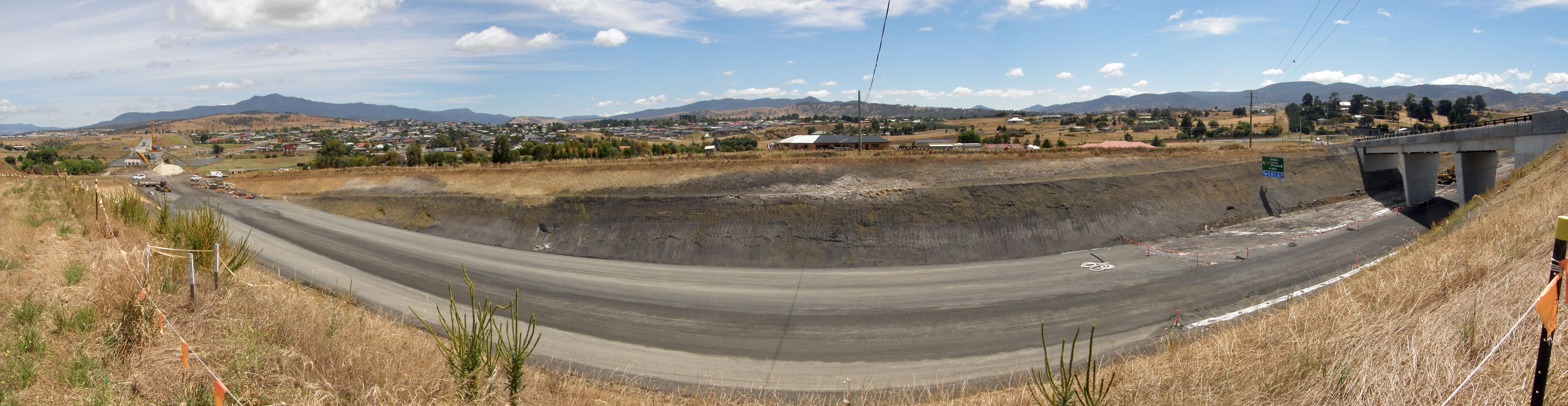
The bypass under construction. The Jordan River Levee can be seen to the left while the Griggs Road overpass is to the right

=== Opening ===
The southernmost 2 km stretch of the Brighton Bypass opened to the public on Monday 13 December 2010, while the official opening of the Bypass was on Monday 12 November 2012 - four months ahead of schedule. One year after opening, the traffic volume on the Midland Highway in Brighton had decreased by 42%, from close to 11,000 vehicles a day to less than 6400.

== Aboriginal heritage issues ==
The Brighton Bypass remains controversial because of the Tasmanian government's refusal to properly investigate the proposed road corridor for Aboriginal sites prior to construction. In September 2009 Aboriginal locals conducted a protest at the Jordan River crossing of the proposed road, stating that construction would destroy an Aboriginal site of potential world significance. Over the next few days, twenty protesters were arrested while attempting to halt work on the bypass. Local Aboriginal activist Michael Mansell called for the bypass to be scrapped stating that to continue "would be cultural vandalism, on an extreme scale". In February 2010, the Aboriginal community gave archaeologists permission to excavate the site, after the state government agreed to consult more closely with it about the cultural values of the site.

=== Jordan River Levee ===
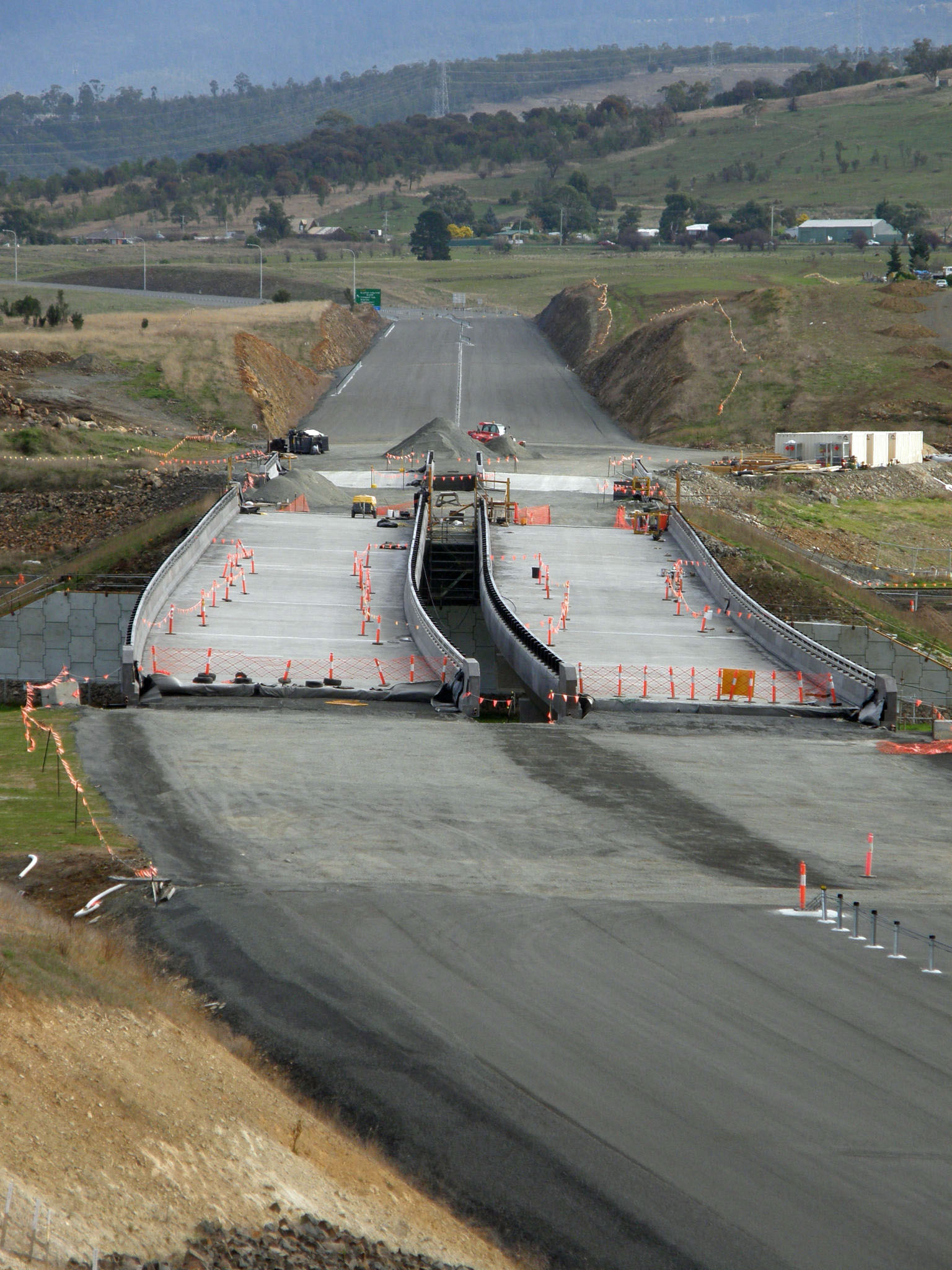
The Jordan River Levee bridge under construction

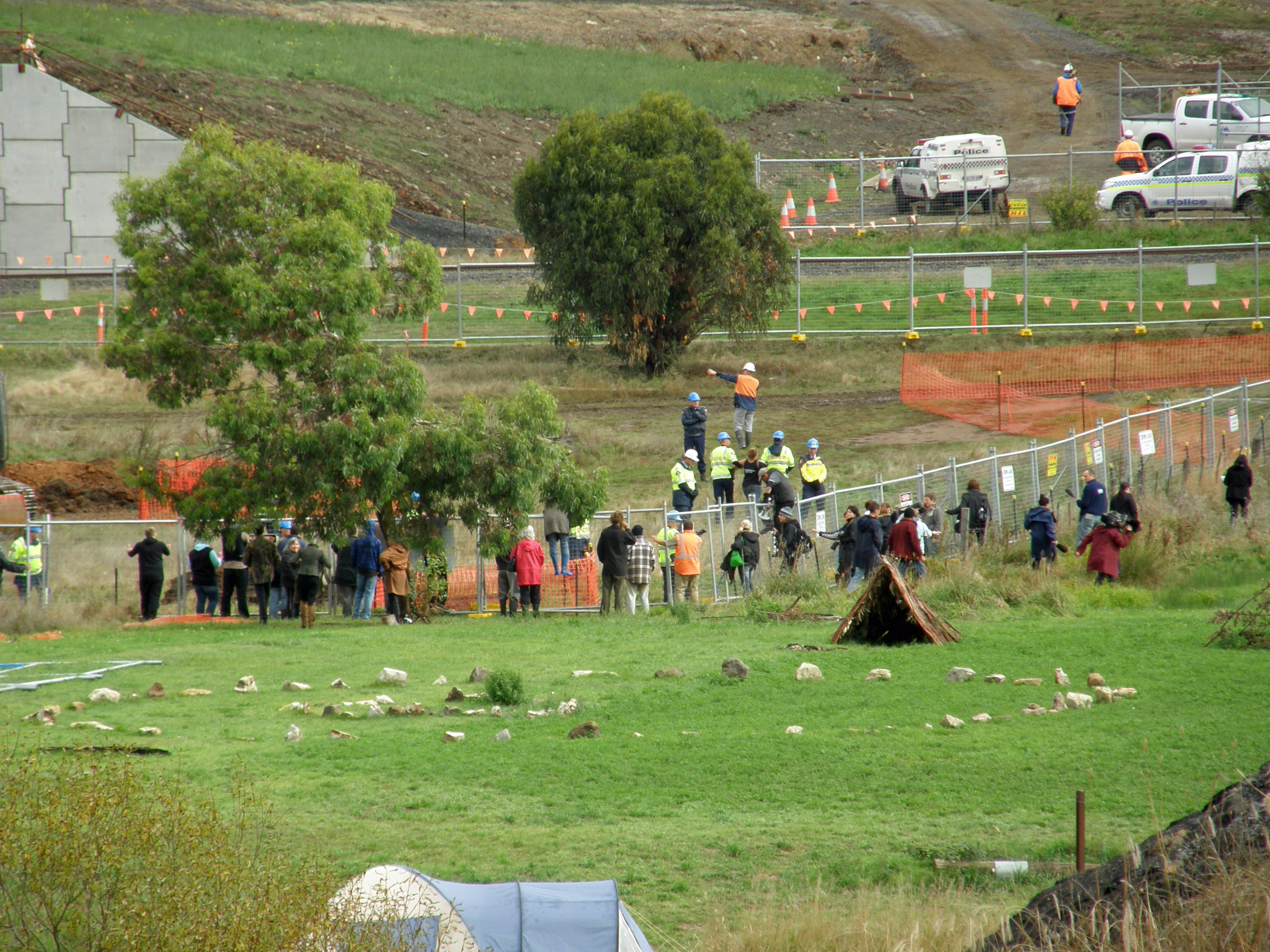
Protests taking place on 15 April 2011

In March 2010, with construction well advanced an archaeological excavation of the Jordan River Levee uncovered stone tools dating back more than 30,000 years. In response, the Department of Primary Industries, Parks, Water and Environment (DPIPWE) placed construction on hold in that section of the project as well as commissioning peer reviews of the findings which were inconsistent with the findings of the original report. There is a range of opinions on the merits of both the original study and the peer reviews.

The government estimated the cost of the bridge at $5 – $10 million and claimed that its construction would protect the site. The local Aboriginal community rejected the bridge proposal and immediately appealed to the Minister of Heritage, David O'Byrne. Over the following weeks, representatives of the Aboriginal community negotiated with the government over the site. They suggested the government re-route funds from their failed Tarkine road project into diverting the bypass around the Levee. They proposed to have the road follow the train tracks before crossing the Jordan River. The government rejected this idea, as funding for the Tarkine road was designated for the north-west of the state and creating a diversion in the sweeping bypass would lower the speed limit, create unsafe geometry, and be almost impossible to build without altering the site of the rail bridge. The Aboriginal community then released an amended plan proposing to have the highway cut through the southern tip of the Brighton Suburb. The government rejected this proposal also, stating that the amended plans would cost an additional $60 million and not address all the safety concerns.

On 17 December 2010, Tasmanian Aboriginals set up camp on the levee and vowed not to budge as bulldozers rolled in. They named the levee "Kutalayna".

On 25 January 2011 Federal Minister for Infrastructure and Transport Anthony Albanese announced his support for the state government's preferred crossing of the Jordan River after the Independent review launched by the Federal government was finalised. The report's key findings stated that the alternative bridging options would increase the overall cost of the bypass by at least $127 million and delay its completion by up to 4 years while new planning and environmental approvals were sought. It also noted that changing the route of the bypass would add between $82 and $140 million to the overall cost of the project.

On 6 March 2011, the protesters attracted 200 people to an open day held at Camp Kutalayna in a show of community support. Visitors were given a tour of the area and told of its cultural and historical significance.

On 11 April 2011, Minister for Environment, Parks and Heritage, Brian Wightman approved a construction environmental management plan enabling construction to start on the Bridge. The following day The Department of Infrastructure, Energy and Resources said it was about to start constructing fences around the boundary of the construction site. The department said they would provide a fenced "safe zone" for Aboriginal protesters. They also said they were prepared for confrontation with protesters at the Jordan River levee site, but were hopeful protests would not escalate to a point where force would be required.

== Exits ==
Most of the road is in the Brighton Council local government area, with the northern tip and interchange falling within the Southern Midlands Council.

| Location | km | mi | Destinations | Notes |
|---|---|---|---|---|
| Bridgewater | 0 | 0.0 | Midland Highway (National Highway 1) southwest / East Derwent Highway (B32) southeast – Hobart, Lindisfarne | Roundabout; southern terminus |
| Brighton | 0.4– 0.8 | 0.25– 0.50 | Brighton Transport Hub | Separate access for northbound and southbound traffic |
| Brighton | 2.4 | 1.5 | Midland Highway north – Brighton, Brighton Transport Hub | Trumpet interchange |
| Brighton | 5.8 | 3.6 | Tea Tree Road (C321) – Brighton, Triabunna | Diamond interchange |
| Pontville | 9.5 | 5.9 | Midland Highway (National Highway 1 north) – Pontville, Launceston | Roundabout; northern terminus |
1.000 mi = 1.609 km; 1.000 km = 0.621 mi

== See also ==
- List of bypasses in Tasmania
