= Highway 1 (Tasmania) =

Network of Highways in Tasmania, Australia

Highway 1 Tasmania
- Map of Tasmania with Highway 1 highlighted in red

General information
- Type: Highway
- Length: 336 km (209 mi)
- Opened: 1955
- Route number(s): Brooker Highway (National Highway 1); Hobart to Granton Midland Highway (National Highway 1); Granton to Launceston Bass Highway (National Highway 1); Launceston to Burnie

Major junctions
- South end: Hobart
- Brooker Highway: Tasman Highway; Davey Street; Domain Highway; Goodwood Road Midland Highway: Lyell Highway; Boyer Road; East Derwent Highway; Highland Lakes Road; Mud Walls Road; Lake Leake Highway; Esk Highway; Powranna Road; Leighlands Road; Illawarra Road; Evandale Road Spur section of: York Street; York Street; Bathurst Street Bass Highway: Meander Valley Road; Illawarra Road; Birralee Road; Highland Lakes Road; Mole Creek Road; Railton Road; Gilbert Street; Port Sorell Road; Stony Rise Road; Forth Road; Castra Road; Gawler Road; Pine Road; Mount Street; (part of the Bass Highway)
- North end: Burnie

Location(s)
- Major settlements: Glenorchy, Brighton, Oatlands, Campbell Town, Perth, Launceston, Deloraine, Devonport, Ulverstone

Highway system
- Highways in Australia; National Highway • Freeways in Australia; Highways in Tasmania

In Tasmania, Highway 1 is a 336-kilometre (209 mi) long route that connects Hobart to the state's north coast, and to Launceston via a 3.8-kilometre (2.4 mi) long spur. Highway 1 also exists on the mainland of Australia, linking the state capitals via a circular route around the coastline. All roads within the Highway 1 system are allocated a road route numbered 1, M1, A1, or B1, depending on the state route numbering system. In Tasmania the highway is designated as National Highway 1, though all other routes in the state are alphanumeric.

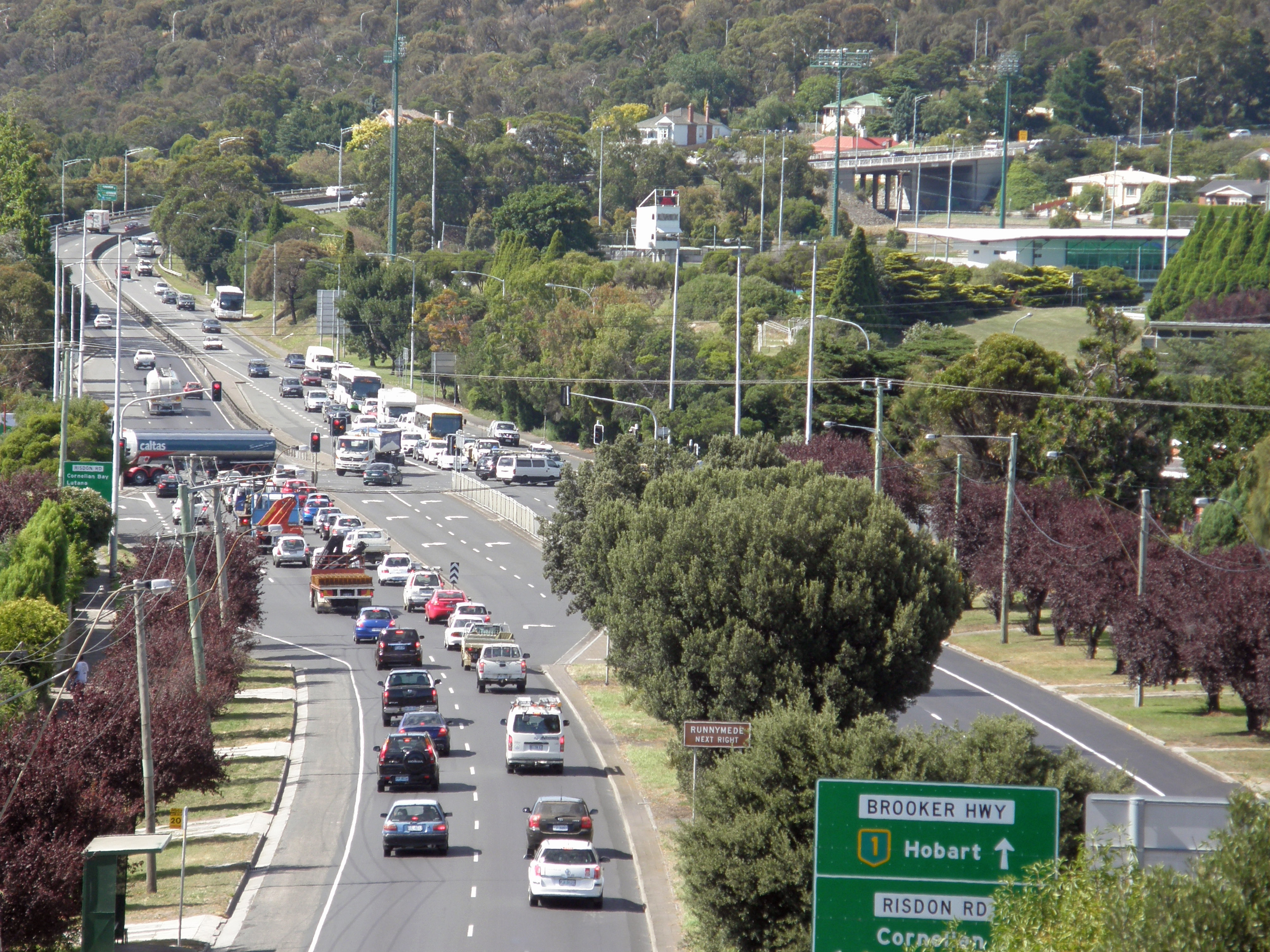
Road sign showing Brooker Highway as National Highway 1 in Hobart

== History ==
The history of Highway 1 in Tasmania dates back to its creation as part of the National Route Numbering system in 1955. The route was compiled from an existing network of state and local roads and tracks, connecting Hobart to the state’s north coast and Launceston via a 3.8-kilometer spur. This highway also exists on the mainland of Australia, linking state capitals via a circular route around the coastline.

== Route description ==
Highway 1 commences in the Hobart city centre as the Brooker Highway, and travels 17 km (11 mi) north on parallel trajectory to the River Derwent until it reaches Granton, where the Highway ends. From this point the Midland Highway becomes Route 1 and travels over the River Derwent and passes through the Brighton Bypass before continuing north towards Launceston. A 3.8-kilometre (2.4 mi) long spur section of Highway 1 travels into the centre of Launceston, first as the continuation of the Midland Highway, and then as a Couplet – northbound on Bathurst Street, and southbound on Wellington Street. South of Launceston, Highway 1 continues west as the Bass Highway to Deloraine, after which it travels north to Devonport, and then west along the northern coast to the route's terminus in Burnie. The Bass Highway, however, continues towards Marrawah on the state's west coast.

== Major intersections ==
- Lyell Highway
- Highland Lake Road
- Esk Highway
- West Tamar Highway

== See also ==
- Highway 1 (Northern Territory)
- Highway 1 (New South Wales)
- Highway 1 (Queensland)
- Highway 1 (South Australia)
- Highway 1 (Victoria)
- Highway 1 (Western Australia)
