= Eastern Ring Road =

Proposed highway in Hobart, Tasmania

The proposed link road.

The Eastern Ring Road is a proposed link between the South Arm Highway and the East Derwent Highway, within the greater area of Hobart, Tasmania. The idea behind the proposal is to see a continuous route from South Arm to the Bowen Bridge without the need to travel via the Tasman Highway. The proposal would see Flagstaff Gully Road extended to the north to meet up with the East Derwent Highway. The idea was first investigated in 1995 when Ratio Consultants did a study on the proposed link. They considered four options for the link, the most popular choice would connect to the East Derwent Highway between Geilston Bay and Risdon Vale. Ratio concluded that constructing any of the options would most likely produce an unacceptable level of visual landscape, ecological, heritage and water quality impacts.
In 2005 during the Clarence City Council elections, Alderman Doug Chipman lobbied the State and Federal governments for the construction of the proposed link road.

A link road between the Tasman Highway and the Bowen Bridge will be needed in the future to take the pressure off Begonia Street, Gordons Hill Road, the East Derwent Highway, and the Tasman Bridge/Brooker Highway
— Doug Chipman

Alderman Chipman also said at the time that while a Flagstaff Gully Link road may not be necessary right now, it probably will be in the next decade. Ald. Chipman suggested that planning should now be undertaken to ensure that when the road is needed, the government will have acquired the land, and informed anybody developing new properties in the area that the road will be built. In 2007 the Clarence City Council backed the proposal to extend the existing Flagstaff Gully Road. The council argued that, as this new road will be linking 2 state highways, it should be a state government responsibility. However, the state government saw it as a council issue.
