= Railway Roundabout =

Railway Roundabout may refer to:

- Railway Roundabout (TV series), BBC television series
- Railway Roundabout, Hobart, roundabout in Tasmania
