= Brooker Highway =

Highway in Tasmania, Australia

Brooker Highway Tasmania
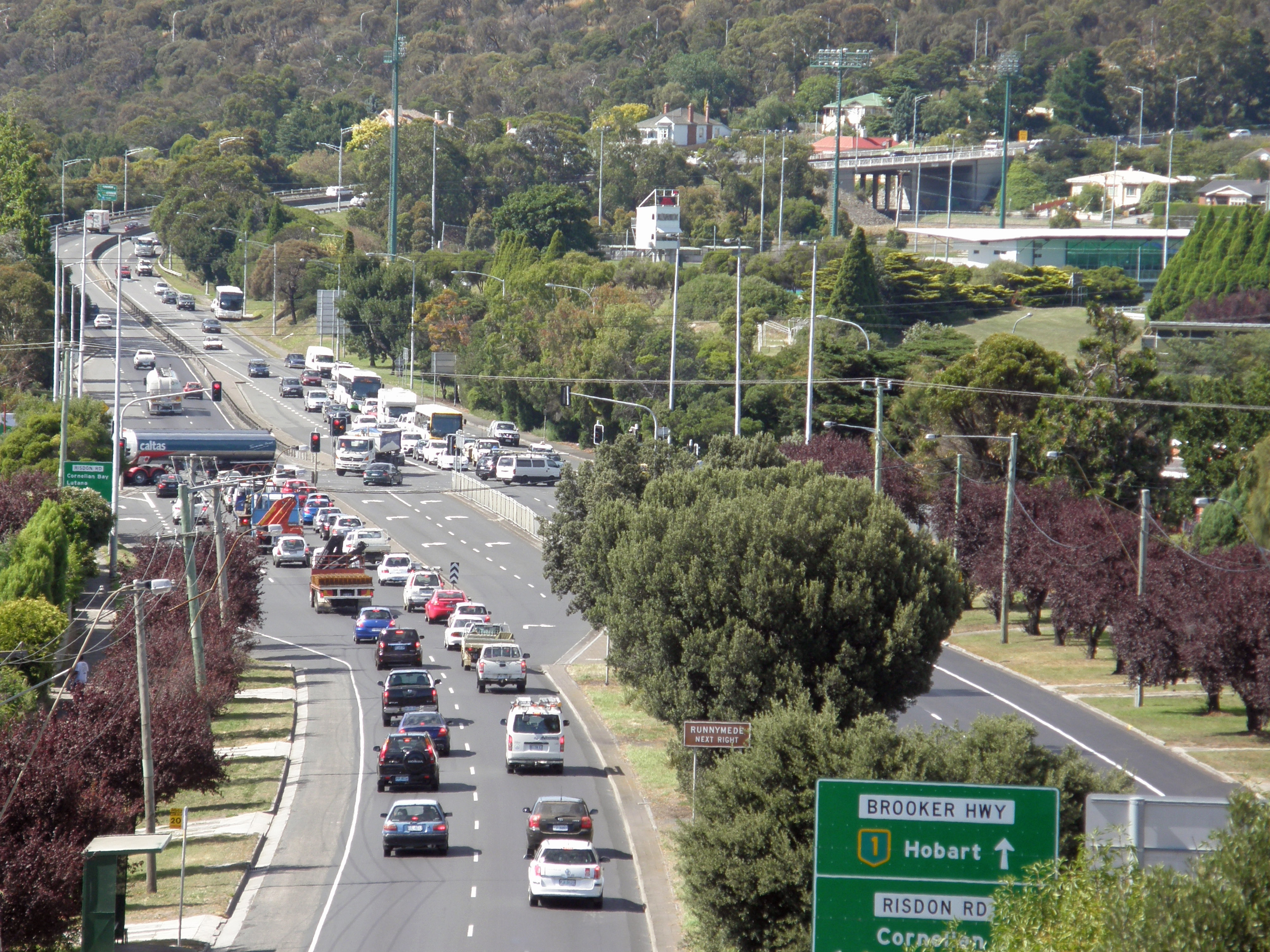
- The busiest point of the Brooker Highway, The traffic lights at Risdon Road

General information
- Type: Highway
- Length: 17 km (11 mi)
- Opened: 1954
- Route number(s): National Highway 1 (Hobart–Granton)
- Former route number: State Route 1

Major junctions
- South end: Tasman Highway / Davey Street / Macquarie Street Hobart, Tasmania
- Domain Highway; Goodwood Road; Lyell Highway
- North end: Midland Highway, Granton, Hobart

Location(s)
- Region: Hobart
- Major suburbs: Glebe, Lutana, Goodwood, Glenorchy, Montrose, Rosetta, Berriedale, Claremont, Austins Ferry

Highway system
- Highways in Australia; National Highway • Freeways in Australia; Highways in Tasmania

The Brooker Highway is a highway in the Australian state of Tasmania. As one of Hobart's three major radials, the highway connects traffic from the city centre with the northern suburbs and is the major road connection to the cities and towns of northern Tasmania. With an annual average daily traffic of 48,000, the highway is one of the busiest in Tasmania. The Brooker Highway has recently been declared part of the National Highway.

The Brooker Highway runs approximately 17 km (11 mi) north from the central business district, through the northern suburbs of Hobart, and through the City of Glenorchy, bypassing commercial and industrial centres along the original Main Road. It is primarily a four lane dual-carriageway highway, and apart from the Domain Highway junction and the Claremont Link Road junction, only the northern sections of the highway have grade separated junctions. The remainder of the junctions are regulated by traffic light intersections and one way on-off junctions.

While the highway is substantially less congested than in other states during peak hours, it is more congested off-peak than roads in Queensland, Western Australia, and almost as congested as those in New South Wales. It is thus a busy road by any Australian standard. The Brooker Highway is currently below the acceptable levels of service, and congestion issues are expected to worsen significantly over the next 20 years with the highway already approaching its designed capacity. A current proposal to convert the South railway line corridor for use as a light rail system has the potential to alleviate the Brooker Highway's traffic problems.

== History ==
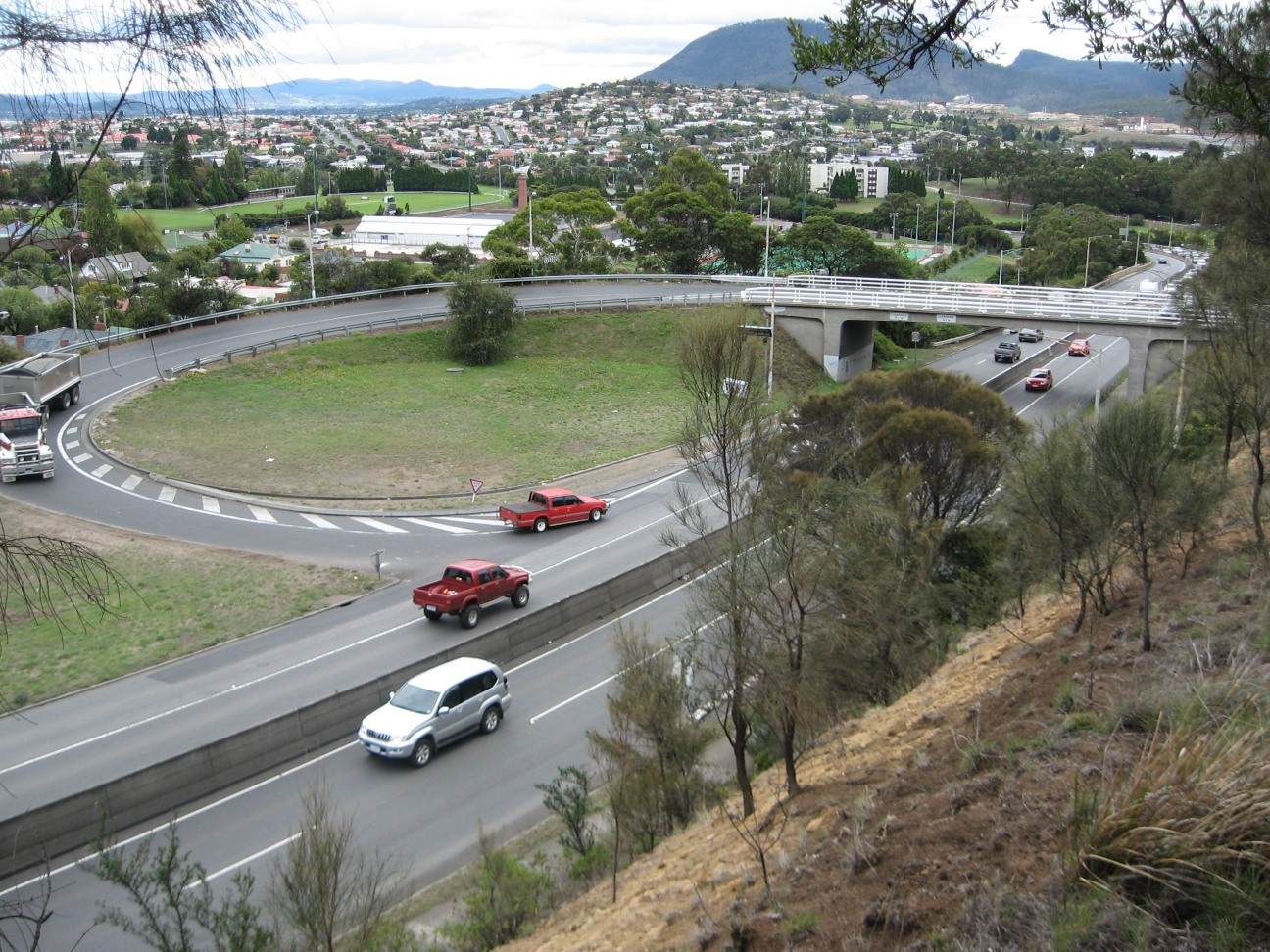
The Domain Highway junction at Cornelian Bay

The first stage of the Brooker Avenue was constructed as a dual carriageway four-lane road in 1954 between Risdon Road, New Town, and Elwick Road, Glenorchy. The north-bound and south-bound roads were divided by a wide median strip with trees planted at intervals. At various points the median strip was dissected by a short roadway to enable traffic to U-turn to the opposite direction.

In 1957 work began on extending the road into Hobart city. This work dissected part of the former racecourse grounds at Cornelian Bay, and the obliteration of Batman Place which was the location of huts built for affordable housing. The road was built on an embankment which crossed the Main Line Railway and Bellevue Parade via a concrete bridge. The road skirted around the edge of the Queens Domain to an area known as Cleary's Gates. At the intersection with the Domain Highway, a grade-separated intersection was completed which is commonly, but incorrectly, known as the 'clover-leaf', this junction is actually a trumpet interchange. Between here and the city the new road consumed much of Park Street.

At Liverpool St a new roundabout, named Railway Roundabout (as it was adjacent to Hobart railway station), was completed in 1960. In 1965, the Hobart Area Transportation Study was released and entailed large development plans for the Brooker Highway, that included extension as far as Granton. By 1966 the road was extended from Elwick Road to the Main Road at Berriedale. This entailed some shoreline reclamation works at Montrose Bay.

In 1977 the highway was further extended, taking the road from a new interchange at Berriedale Road to the Claremont Link Road. This section was initially a single-lane road each-way but with a third climbing lane in the north direction. In 1981 the final section between Claremont Link Road and Midland Highway at Granton was commenced. This was opened in 1983 as a single-lane road each-way, and with a long climbing lane in the south direction, commencing from Black Snake Lane and merging in near Hilton Road, in Austins Ferry. In 1992 the four-lane dual carriageway highway that stands today was completed through to Granton and the Bridgewater bridge.

The Brooker Highway was built as a replacement to the original Midland Highway route between Hobart city and Granton, which passed along Elizabeth Street, New Town Road and Main Road, through the built up areas of New Town, Moonah, Glenorchy, Rosetta, Montrose, Claremont and Berriedale. This was the first major highway construction in the Hobart City region, and was named Brooker Highway, after the Minister for Transport at the time of the conception of the project, Edward Brooker. Although the road's formal name is Brooker Avenue, it is more commonly referred to as Brooker Highway whilst the section between Berriedale and Granton is often referred to as the Northern Outlet.

=== Timeline ===
- 1954: Stage One: Risdon Road, New Town – Elwick Road, Glenorchy.
- 1959: Stage Two: Risdon Road, New Town – Liverpool St, CBD (Railway Roundabout completed 1960).
- 1966: Stage Three: Elwick Road, Glenorchy – Main Road, Berriedale.
- 1977: Stage Four: Main Road, Berriedale – Claremont Link Road, Claremont (single carriageway with north climbing lane).
- 1983: Stage Five: Claremont Link Road, Claremont – Midland Hwy, Granton (single carriageway with south climbing lane).
- 1992: Stage Six: Claremont Link Road, Claremont – Black Snake Lane, Granton (dual carriageway).

=== Lighting ===
In April 2007, the Department of Infrastructure, Energy & Resources announced plans to replace the sub-standard rusted light poles between Risdon Road and Clearys Gates Road. These are over 40 years old and were the first lights on the Highway, which sparked some concern from the Hobart City Council. They argue that the light poles are in good condition and are a significant feature of the Brooker Highway entrance to Hobart. While the Hobart City Council supports the replacement, they have written to Infrastructure Minister Jim Cox asking him to consider retaining the ornate arms on modern pole bases.

=== 2010 emergency landing incident ===
On 4 April 2010 18-year-old pilot Patrick Humphries made world headlines by using the normally busy highway as an emergency landing strip after running out of fuel. Humphries was unhurt from the accident and no vehicles were involved in the incident.

=== 2016–17 Elwick Rd/Goodwood Rd and Howard Rd/Renfrew Cir intersection upgrades ===
Before 2016, Elwick Road and Goodwood Road formed two separate t-junctions on opposite sides of the Brooker Highway offset by around 100m. The upgrade undertaken between January 2016 and May 2017 aligned Elwick Road with Goodwood Road so that one set of traffic lights could be removed. Extra lanes were also added.

At the same time the adjacent Brooker Highway intersection, Howard Road / Renfrew Circuit was also converted from a five-exit two-lane roundabout to a traffic-lights controlled intersection. The fifth exit from the former Brooker Highway roundabout, Timsbury Road, is now accessed from Howard Road. The contract for the works, awarded to Hazell Bros was worth $32 million.

== Future ==
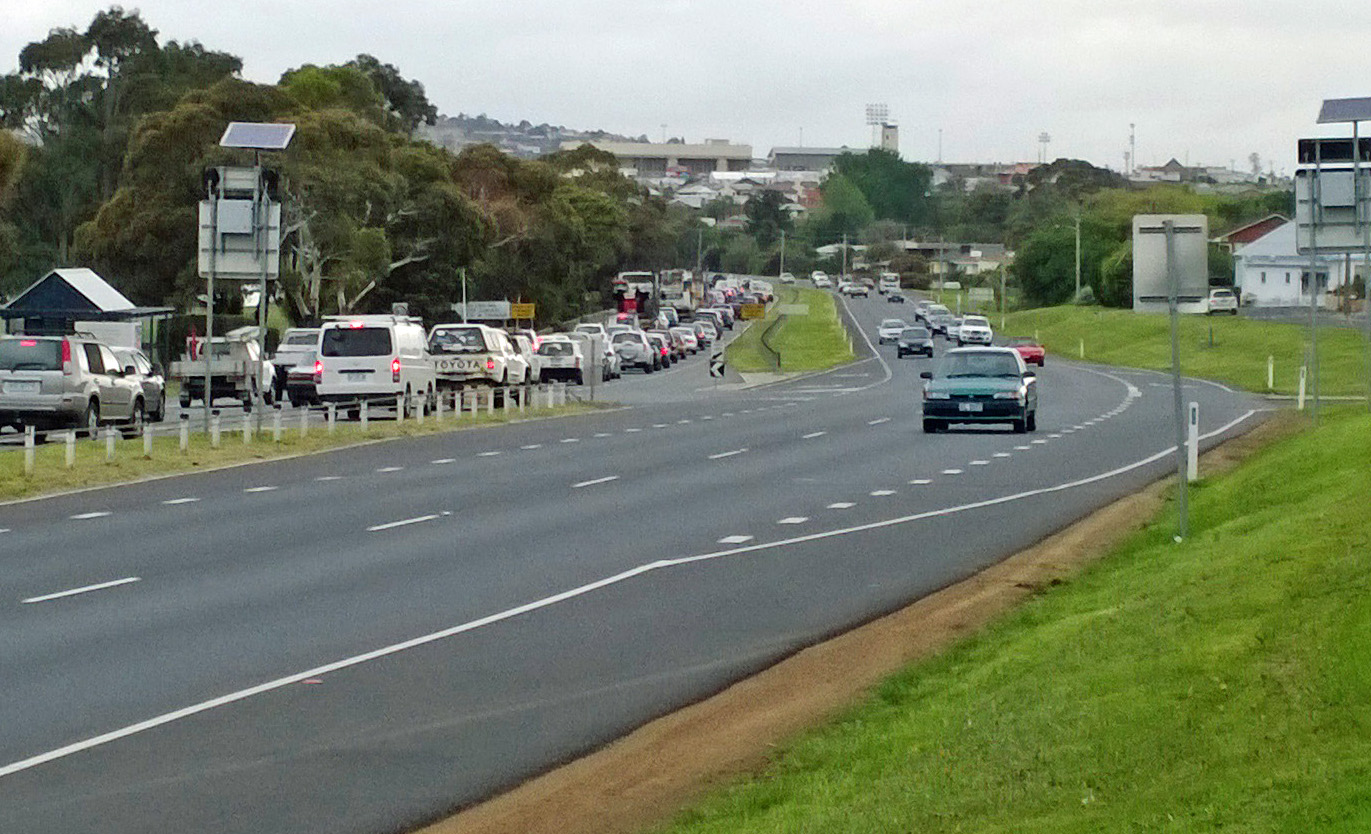
Morning Peak Hour at Montrose During the Royal Hobart Show

In February 2011, the Department of Infrastructure, Energy & Resources revealed intentions to within 3 years "Finalise design options for Domain Highway intersection and increased lane capacity between Domain Highway and Risdon Road". This intention was reaffirmed in an October 2017 submission by the Tasmanian Government to Infrastructure Australia: "Brooker Highway - Risdon Road to Domain Highway - no cost estimate, concept designs to be prepared."

The Department of State Growth released a report titled Hobart Congestion Traffic Analysis 2016 prepared by traffic engineer Keith Midson. Under long-term solutions, the report considered the Liverpool St intersection with the Brooker Hwy, also known as the 'railway roundabout'. The report stated "The railway roundabout is a major cause of congestion... A possible solution is the grade separation of the roundabout."

Recently the government came under pressure from the community to improve pedestrian access over the highway at Goodwood and eliminate the stairs primarily for the benefit of the elderly and handicapped.

== Route description ==
The highway starts in the Hobart CBD at the junction with Eastern Outlet (A3, Tasman Highway), Davey Street (A6) and Macquarie Street (A6). The Tasman Highway heads east over the Tasman Bridge, past the Airport and eventually leads to the east coast of the state, while Davey Street leads towards the Southern Outlet (A6), which in turn heads south towards Kingston and Huonville (Davey and Macquarie are one-way streets - Davey Street flows south-west, and Macquarie Street flows north-east through the CBD).

Apart from the connection to Davey and Macquarie Streets, the major intersection with streets in the CBD is the three-lane roundabout at the north-east end of Liverpool Street. Because it was built in close proximity to the Hobart railway station at the time, the roundabout was, and continues to be, called the Railway Roundabout. The sunken garden in the centre of the roundabout functions as a pedestrian thoroughfare, with under-road tunnels connecting to the two sides of Liverpool Street, the original site of the railway station to the north-east, and to the Domain and the suburb of The Glebe to the north-west. The roundabout was originally just an un-controlled intersection, but with the gradual increase in traffic, particularly from the eastern shore of the Derwent, it was often in grid-lock at peak travel times. Traffic lights were introduced and alleviated the situation, and later construction of the direct links from the Tasman Bridge to Davey and Macquarie Streets further relieved the pressure. Other streets from the CBD provide access to the highway, but for much of its length to the city boundary at Risdon Road it is limited access road.

Through the City of Glenorchy the highway has large multi-lane intersections, at Risdon Road, Elwick Road and Derwent Park Road. The highway is in a reasonable condition for its age, but does experience congestion for certain periods during the day.

Trees line the middle nature strip for several kilometres, and fencing prevents pedestrian access at various points. The Highway makes its way past The Domain, Cornelian Bay Hockey Grounds, Rugby Park, The Royal Hobart Showgrounds, Tattersalls Park and the Derwent Entertainment Centre. At the northern end (at Granton) it connects to the Midland Highway (National Highway 1) (which heads north towards Launceston) and the Lyell Highway (A10) (which takes motorists towards the west coast).

== Major intersections ==
LGA	Location	km	mi	Destinations	Notes
Hobart	Hobart	0	0.0	Tasman Highway (A3) north / Davey Street & Macquarie Street one-way couplet (A6) south – Sorrel, Hobart Airport	Highway terminus; no access from the highway to Davey Street or Macquarie Street
Hobart	Hobart	0.3– 0.4	0.19– 0.25	Liverpool Street (A3) to Tasman Highway northeast / Liverpool Street & Bathurst Street one-way couplet southwest – Sorrel, Hobart Airport, Hobart city centre	Traffic light controlled roundabout
Hobart	Hobart	1.1	0.68	Warwick Street – Hobart, North Hobart	
Hobart	North Hobart–Glebe boundary	1.3	0.81	Burnett Street southwest / Shoobridge Street east – North Hobart, West Hobart, Glebe	Shoobridge Street intersection is left-in/left-out only; Complete access between Brooker Highway and Burnett Street at traffic lights
Hobart	New Town	3.0– 3.2	1.9– 2.0	Domain Highway (B36) – Tasman Bridge, Sorrel, Royal Tasmanian Botanical Gardens	Trumpet interchange
Hobart–Glenorchy boundary	New Town–Moonah–Lutana tripoint	4.1	2.5	Risdon Road - New Town, Lenah Valley, Cornelian Bay, Lutana, Risdon	
Glenorchy	Moonah–Lutana boundary	4.9	3.0	Bowen Road south / Ashbolt Crescent east – Moonah, Lutana	
Glenorchy	Moonah–Lutana–Derwent Park tripoint	5.6	3.5	Derwent Park Road – Derwent Park, Moonah, Ridson, Prince of Wales Bay	
Glenorchy	Derwent Park	6.3	3.9	Lampton Avenue – Derwent Park, Prince of Wales Bay	Lampton Avenue east of intersection is left-in/left-out only
Glenorchy	Glenorchy–Goodwood boundary	7.1	4.4	Howard Road south / Renfrew Court north – Derwent Park, Goodwood	
Glenorchy	Glenorchy–Goodwood boundary	7.5	4.7	Goodwood Road (B35) – Bowen Bridge	
Glenorchy	Glenorchy	7.6	4.7	Elwick Road – Glenorchy, Tolosa Park	
Glenorchy	Glenorchy	8.0	5.0	Loyd Road – Derwent Entertainment Centre	
Glenorchy	Rosetta	9.7– 10.1	6.0– 6.3	Main Road – Berriedale, Rosetta	Left-in/left-out intersection for each carriageway
Glenorchy	Berriedale	10.6	6.6	Berriedale Road (C615) – Berriedale, Chigwell, Collinsvale	Partial diamond interchange: no exit southbound
Glenorchy	Berriedale–Claremont–Chigwell tripoint	12.4	7.7	Claremont Link Road – Chigwell, Claremont, Cadbury	Diamond interchange
Glenorchy	Claremont	13.6	8.5	Abbotsfield Road – Claremont	Left-in/left-out intersection for each carriageway
Glenorchy	Claremont	14.8	9.2	Hilton Road - Austins Ferry	Left-in/left-out access southbound
Glenorchy	Claremont	15.1	9.4	Upper Hilton Road – Austins Ferry	Left-in/left-out access northbound
Glenorchy	Granton	17.9	11.1	Black Snake Road south / Main Road east – Granton, Austins Ferry	Left-in/left-out access northbound; entrance ramp southbound
Glenorchy	Granton	18.3	11.4	Main Road – Granton, Austins Ferry	Southbound exit only
Glenorchy	Granton	18.5	11.5	Midland Highway (National Highway 1) north / Lyell Highway (A10) west – Bridgewater, Launceston, New Norfolk, Hamilton	Roundabout removed in 2025. Replaced with in/out left access westbound for Blacksnake Road and Lyell Highway, left in/out access southbound for Lyell Highway and Main Road (Trumpet interchange); northern highway terminus
1.000 mi = 1.609 km; 1.000 km = 0.621 mi: Incomplete access

== See also ==
- List of highways in Hobart
- List of bypasses in Tasmania
