= Elwick Road =

Road in Hobart, Tasmania

Coordinates: 42.8306°S 147.2818°E

Elwick Road Tasmania

General information
- Type: Road
- Length: 1 km (0.6 mi)
- Former route number: State Route 1

Major junctions
- East end: Goodwood, Tasmania
- Brooker Highway; Main Road
- West end: Glenorchy, Tasmania

Location(s)
- Major suburbs: Elwick

Elwick Road is a major arterial road that runs through the northern suburbs of Hobart, Tasmania. The road is the major link road between the Main Road and the Brooker Highway that connects to Glenorchy. Elwick passes through residential areas.

In 2008, the Tasmanian Department of Infrastructure, Energy and Resources proposed the realignment of Elwick Road with Goodwood Road were realigned to form one intersection, reducing confusion and the number of traffic lights on the Brooker Highway and to improve rush hour efficiency. A $32 million AUD plan was released in 2015 and construction was completed in 2016.
