= Derwent Park Road =

Road in Hobart, Tasmania

Coordinates: 42.84°S 147.30°E

Derwent Park Road Tasmania

General information
- Type: Road
- Length: 2 km (1.2 mi)

Major junctions
- East end: Lutana, Tasmania
- Brooker Highway, Main Road
- West end: Derwent Park, Tasmania

Derwent Park Road is a major link road that connects the Brooker Highway to the Main Road, in the northern suburbs of Hobart, Tasmania. The Road starts at Main Road, Derwent Park and continues East across the Brooker Highway, ending at the Hobart Zinc Works. The road serves in excess of 14,000 vehicles per day.
