= Main Road, Hobart =

Road in Hobart, Tasmania

Main Road Tasmania
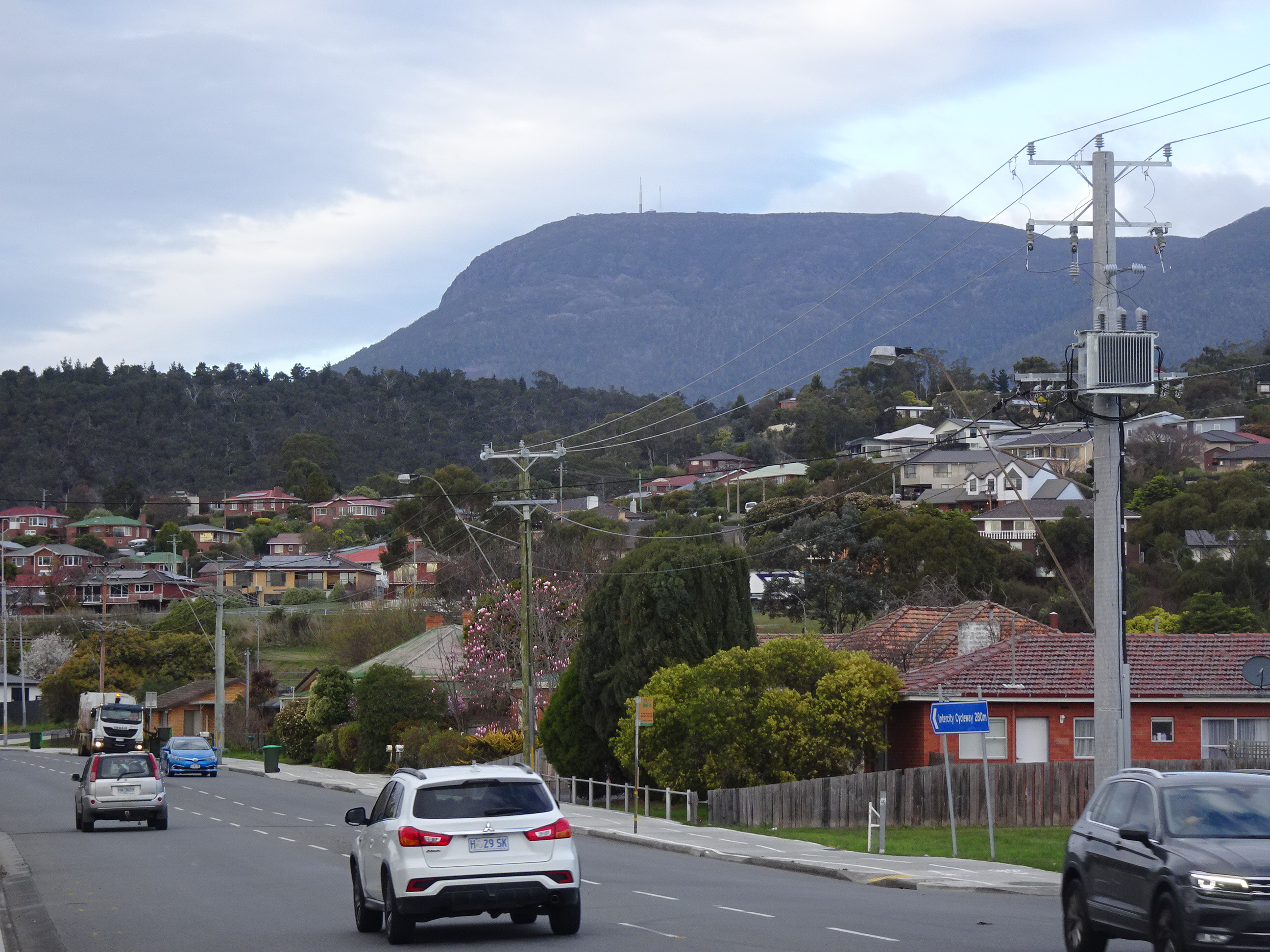
- Along Main Road at Berriedale Bay

General information
- Type: Road
- Length: 10 km (6.2 mi)
- Former route number: State Route 1

Major junctions
- South end: New Town, Tasmania Lenah Valley, Tasmania
- Brooker Highway, Derwent Park Road, Elwick Road, Lampton Avenue, Risdon Road
- North end: Brooker Highway, A10 Lyell Highway, Granton, Tasmania

Location(s)
- Major suburbs: Moonah, Glenorchy, Montrose, Rosetta, Berriedale, Tasmania, Claremont, Austins Ferry

Main Road is a major arterial road that runs through the northern suburbs of Hobart, Tasmania. The road continues on from New Town Road at Lenah Valley and runs in close proximity with the Southern Railway Line and travels on a near parallel trajectory with the River Derwent until it reaches Granton where it merges with the Brooker Highway. Prior to the construction of the Brooker Highway the only way traffic could travel to the northern cities of the state was to drive via Main Road.

Main Road is an important road corridor that has been the major road link in Glenorchy since the 19th century. It connects the Moonah, Derwent Park and Glenorchy commercial areas. It also provides a major alternative route to Hobart than the Brooker Highway. The Main Road is used by 24,000 vehicles per day.
