= Lampton Avenue, Hobart =

Road in Hobart, Tasmania

Lampton Avenue Tasmania

General information
- Type: Road
- Length: 2 km (1.2 mi)

Major junctions
- East end: Goodwood, Tasmania
- Brooker Highway, Main Road
- West end: Derwent Park, Tasmania

Lampton Avenue is a major link road that connects Main Road to Brooker Highway, in the northern suburbs of Hobart, Tasmania. The road starts at Main Road and continues through the traffic lights intersection on the Brooker Highway to Gepp Parade, Goodwood, Tasmania. Between Main and Brooker the road is generally a lot more busy as it picks up traffic weaving between the two major roads in a mainly industrial area. The road serves approximately 15,000 vehicles per day.
