= Hobart Bridge =

Demolished bridge in Hobart, Tasmania

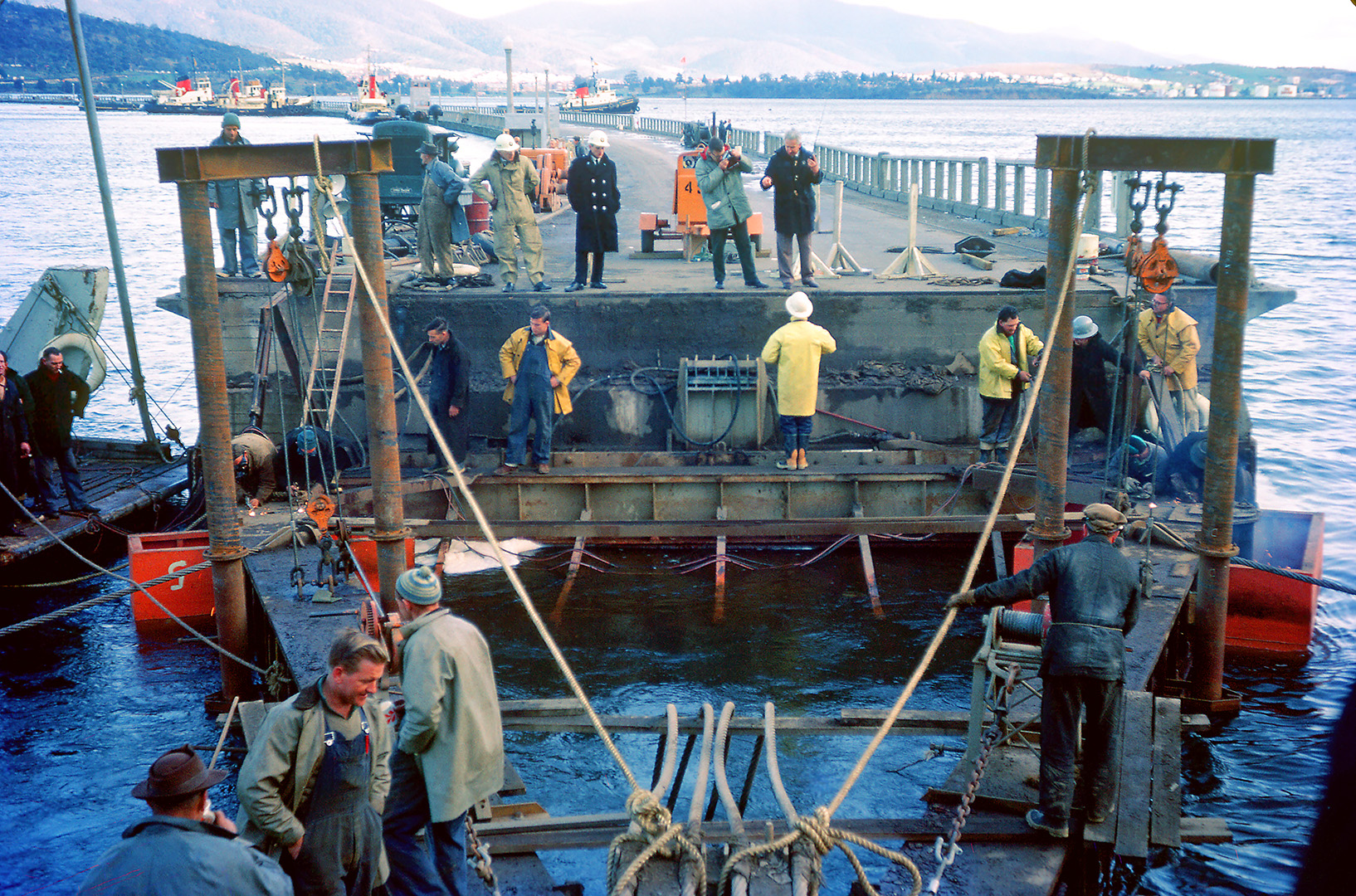
- The eastern end being detached from its shore connection in 1964
- Coordinates: 42°51′47″S 147°20′33″E
- Carries: Tasman Highway
- Crosses: River Derwent
- Locale: Hobart, Tasmania
- Owner: Government of Tasmania

Characteristics
- Design: Floating arch bridge
- Total length: 961 metres (3,154 ft)
- Width: 12 metres (40 ft 6 in)
- Clearance below: 44 metres (145 ft 6 in) (low tide)
- No. of lanes: 2

History
- Opened: 22 December 1943
- Closed: 17 August 1964
- Replaced by: Tasman Bridge

Statistics
- Toll: 22 December 1943 – 31 December 1948

Location
- Interactive map of Hobart Bridge

The Hobart Bridge was a pontoon bridge with a vertical-lift section that crossed the River Derwent just north of the newer Tasman Bridge, the first crossing to connect the eastern and western shores of the city of Hobart, Tasmania, Australia.

== History ==
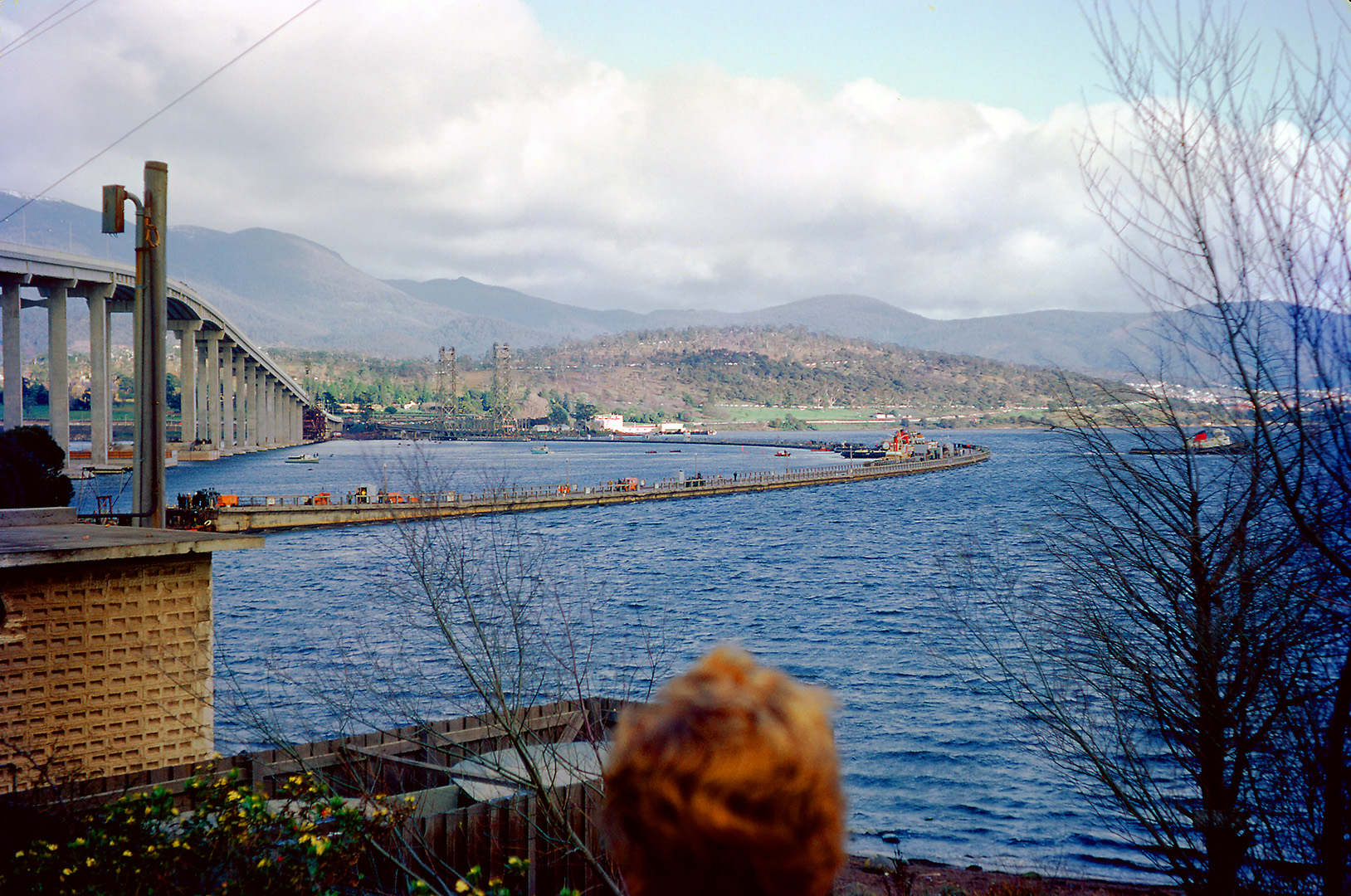
Now separated in the middle, the eastern half is ready to be towed up-river to its final resting place in Gielston Bay, the new Tasman Bridge on the left

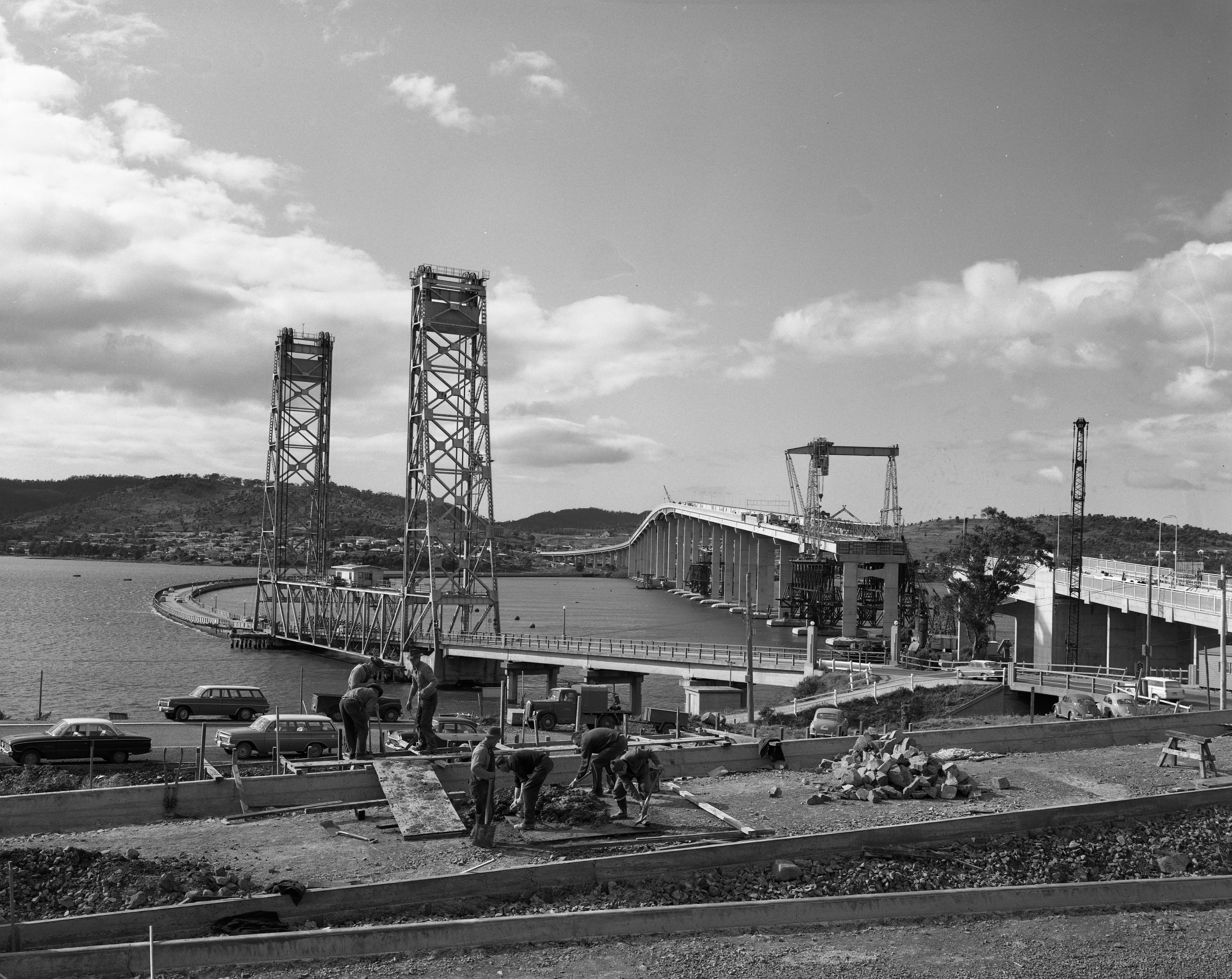
Tasman Bridge under construction with pontoon bridge still in operation in 1964

Plans for a bridge to link the River Derwent's two shores near Hobart date back to 1832. It was not until 1943 that the first bridge was completed, the Hobart floating bridge and lift span. The bridge was opened to toll traffic on 22 December 1943 and the collection of tolls continued until midnight on 31 December 1948. It was built by the Hobart Bridge Co, being sold to the Government of Tasmania in 1946.

Soon after its opening a violent storm blew in and damaged a section of the bridge, and to prevent the same happening again, the bridge was anchored to the riverbed in the middle and strengthening cables were added to stiffen the structure. After these modifications were completed the lifespan of the bridge was estimated as 21 years.

The bridge provided much better connection between the eastern and western shores, and consequently development on the eastern shore sped up and became so dense by the mid-1950s that the floating bridge could no longer handle the amount of traffic that was crossing it. Congestion became a severe problem. It was laid reaching the end of its useful life. As such, in the late 1950s the decision was taken to construct a completely new bridge, the Tasman Bridge, which opened in August 1964.

The floating bridge was closed to traffic on 17 August 1964, and the following day the locking pin was removed and the two concrete sections towed away. For several years they were moored, but one of them sank in November 1970, and the council undertook to dispose of them. The two halves were cut up and sunk at various locations.

The lift span was left in situ for some years but in the end it too was demolished. Today the only reminders of the bridge are the eastern foot of the lifting section which is still in place, and the preserved locking pin. One of the pontoons was sunk at Alonnah, and remains in use as a public jetty. Another piece is sunk in Ralphs Bay, in about 12 metres (40 ft) of water.

== Construction ==
The Hobart Bridge was of unique design and construction, and the first of its type anywhere in the world. It was a floating bridge with a lift span, constructed of hollow concrete pontoons, 24 in all, connected together forming a crescent shape curved upstream, and anchored in the middle.

The bridge was constructed in 12-pontoon sections which were then towed out into the river and connected to the banks and to each other in the middle. The total volume of concrete used in making these pontoons was 8,410 cubic metres (11,000 cu yd). The two halves of the bridge were made of ten 40 metres (131 ft 6 in) pontoons, one 38-metre (124 ft 6 in) section, and one 42-metre (138 ft 6 in) section, joined in the middle by a 324 millimetres (12 3/4 in) vertical locking pin, which was saved when the bridge was demolished and is now on display outside the Royal Engineers Building in Hobart.

The total length of the roadway was 961 metres (3,154 ft). The total width of the bridge was 12 metres (40 ft 6 in). It had a two-lane roadway and a footpath on one side. At the western end a large lifting section was provided to allow ships to pass. It provided a vertical clearance of 44 metres (145 ft 6 in) at low tide, and the opening section was 55 metres (180 ft) wide. Four 450-kilowatt (600 hp) electric motors were used to open the bridge, which took two minutes. The total weight of steel used in the construction of the bridge was 3,150 tonnes (3,100 long tons).

== Engineering heritage award ==
The bridge received an Engineering Heritage National Marker from Engineers Australia as part of its Engineering Heritage Recognition Program.
