= Domain Highway =

Highway in Tasmania

Domain Highway Tasmania

General information
- Type: Highway
- Location: Queens Domain
- Length: 2.0 km (1.2 mi)
- Opened: 1943
- Route number(s): B36

Major junctions
- Northwest end: Brooker Highway (National Highway 1)
- Queens Walk; Lower Domain Road
- Southeast end: Tasman Highway (A3)

Location(s)
- Region: Hobart

Highway system
- Highways in Australia; National Highway • Freeways in Australia; Highways in Tasmania

The Domain Highway is a highway in Tasmania, Australia. The highway acts as a link road connecting traffic between Hobart's two busiest highways; The Tasman Highway and the Brooker Highway while also bypassing the Hobart city centre. With recorded annual average daily traffic of 25,000, the single carriageway road is busier than some of Hobart's dual carriageway highways. Commencing at the Brooker Highway at Cornelian Bay and heading southeast between the banks of the River Derwent and the Domain and Botanical Gardens. The highway ends at the Tasman Highway, on the western approach of the Tasman Bridge.

In 2025, the highway was closed for two months to install sewerage pipelines. In 2026, the Tasmanian Government announced that they will be fixing and improving the highway.

== Exits ==
The entire highway is in the City of Hobart local government area.

Location	km	mi	Destinations	Notes
New Town	0	0.0	Brooker Highway (National Highway 1) - Hobart, Glenorchy, Launceston	North-western highway terminus; trumpet interchange
Queens Domain	0.55	0.34	Queens Walk – Cornelian Bay	T junction
Queens Domain	0.85	0.53	Lower Domain Road – Botanical Gardens	T junction
Queens Domain	2.0	1.2	Tasman Highway (A3) - Hobart, Sorrel, Hobart Airport	South-eastern highway terminus; semi-directional T interchange
1.000 mi = 1.609 km; 1.000 km = 0.621 mi

== See also ==
- List of highways in Hobart
