= List of highways in Tasmania =

A list of highways in the island state of Australia

Tasmania

The Highways in Tasmania generally expand from Hobart and other major cities with secondary roads interconnecting the highways to each other. Functions of these highways include freight, personal travel and tourism.

The AusLink Network currently consists of the Midland, Bass, Brooker, East Tamar Highway and the southern section of the Tasman Highway (Hobart-Hobart Airport).

Tasmanian highway naming is straightforward. Most are generally named after the geographical regions and features, cities, towns and settlements along the way.

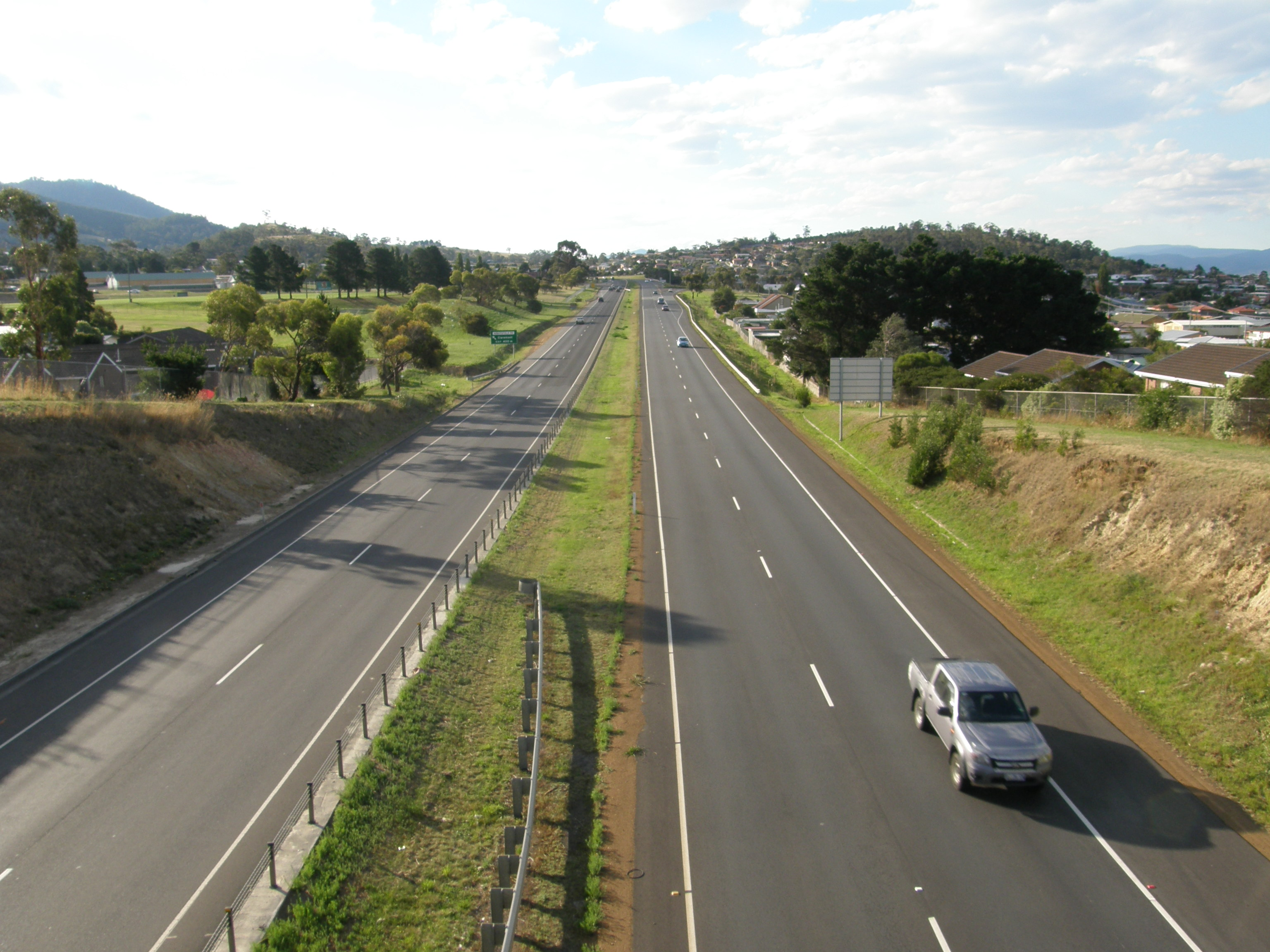
Brooker Highway

Excluding the old National Highway (Brooker, Midland, Bass), Tasmanian routes have been marked with the alphanumeric marking scheme since 1979, based on the marking scheme implemented in the United Kingdom in 1922. Prior to this Tasmanian roads were marked with a National and State Route Numbering System.

Highways are a part of Tasmania's road network, which covers a distance of approximately 24,000 kilometres (15,000 mi). As well as major highways between cities and ports, urban connectors between suburbs and commercial areas, residential streets, and forestry roads are also included. The most important state and regional connections, totalling 3,650 kilometres (2,270 mi), are state-owned roads, which are further classified into a road hierarchy. The herirachy consists of:

- Trunk roads – major highways which are the "primary freight and passenger roads"
- Regional freight roads – regional roads which connect heavy freight to the trunk roads
- Regional access roads – providing access to Tasmania’s Regions, with less traffic than trunk and regional freight roads
- Feeder roads – connect population centres and tourist traffic to and from the rest of the state road network
- Other roads – lower traffic roads, primarily providing access to private properties

== Trunk roads ==
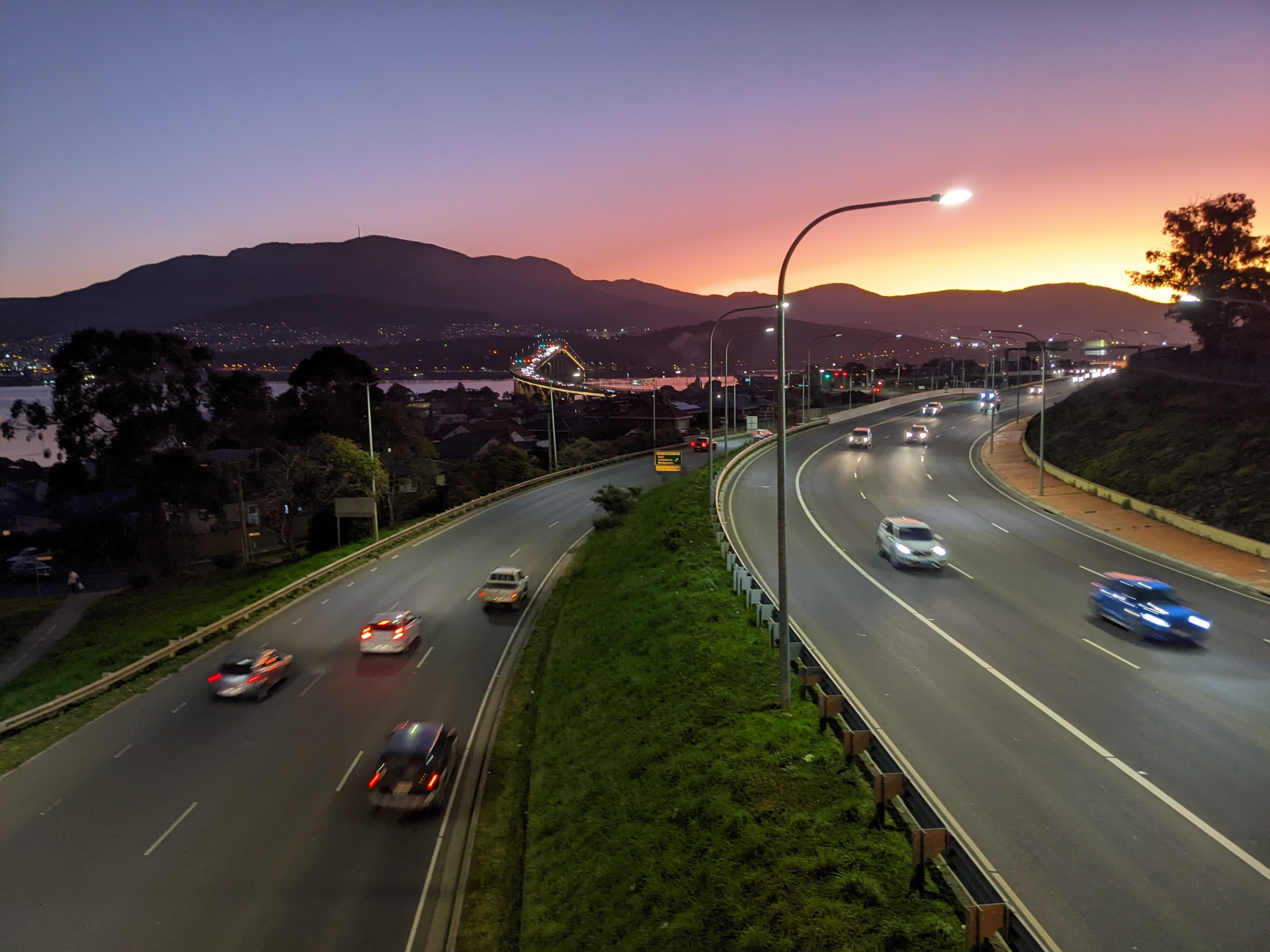
Tasman Highway at Rose Bay, Hobart

The following roads are classified as trunk roads:

- Bass Highway (Launceston to Wynyard)
- Brooker Highway
- Davey Street
- Domain Highway
- East Tamar Highway
- Illawarra Road
- Macquarie Street
- Midland Highway
- Southern Outlet
- Tasman Highway (Hobart to Hobart Airport)

== Regional freight roads ==
The following roads are classified as regional freight roads:

- Bass Highway (Wynyard to Smithton)
- Batman Highway
- Birralee Road
- Bridport Road
- Fingerpost Road
- Frankford Road (Exeter to Birralee)
- Freestone Point Road
- Huon Highway (Kingston to Huonville)
- Lyell Highway (Granton to Rosegarland)
- Old Surrey Road
- Ridgley Highway
- Tasman Highway (Hobart Airport to Triabunna, and Legerwood to Scottsdale)
- Tea Tree Road
- West Tamar Highway (Exeter to Sidmouth)

== Regional access roads ==
The following roads are classified as regional access roads:

- Channel Highway (Kingston to Kettering)
- Huon Highway (Huonville to Dover)
- Arthur Highway
- South Arm Highway (Warrane to Howrah)
- East Derwent Highway
- Goodwood Road
- Tasman Highway (Triabunna to Swansea, and Falmouth to St Helens)
- Lyell Highway (Rosegarland to Queenstown)
- Esk Highway
- Lilydale Road
- West Tamar Highway (Launceston to Exeter)
- Zeehan Highway
- Murchison Highway (Zeehan to Guildford)
- Stony Rise Road
- Mersey Main Road
- Railton Road (Latrobe to Railton)
- Port Sorell Road (East Devonport)

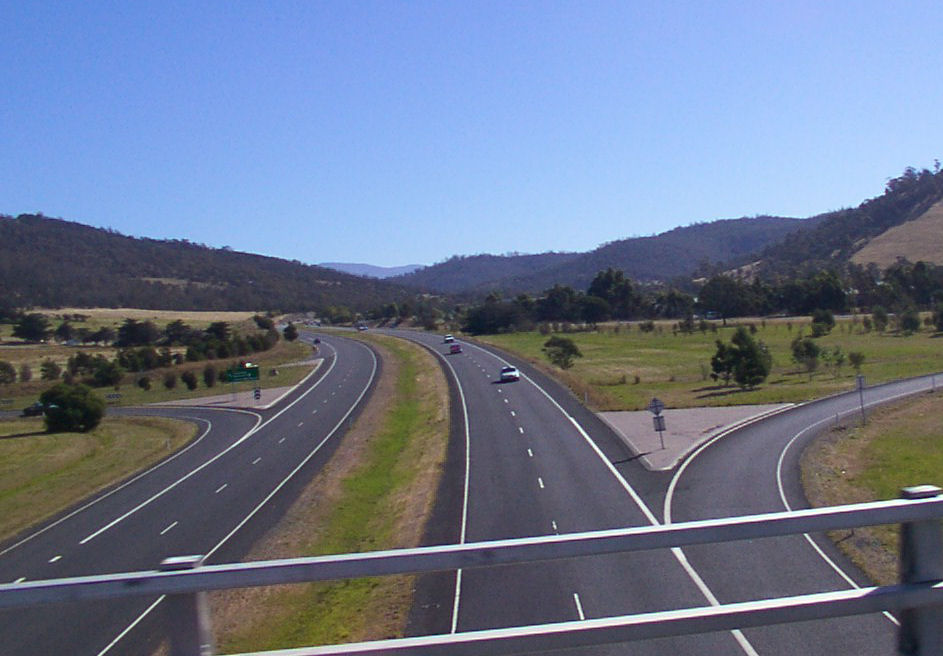
Tasman Highway

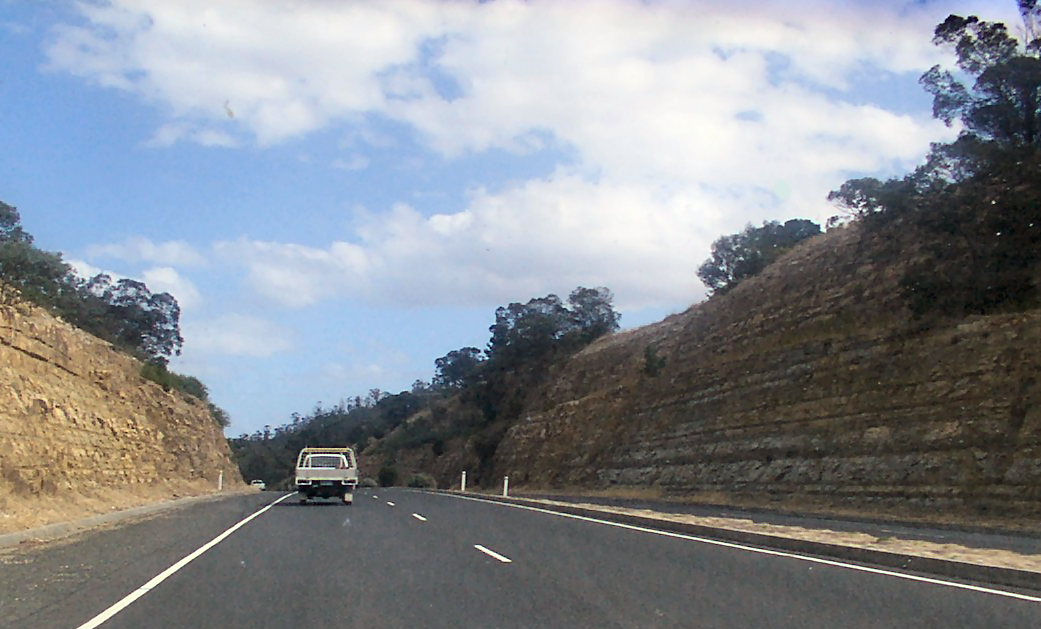
East Derwent Highway

== See also ==
- List of road routes in Tasmania
- Highways in Australia for highways in other states and territories
- List of highways in Australia for roads named as highways, but not necessarily classified as highways
