= Goodwood Road, Hobart =

Road in Hobart, Tasmania

Coordinates: 42.8216°S 147.3025°E

Goodwood Road Tasmania
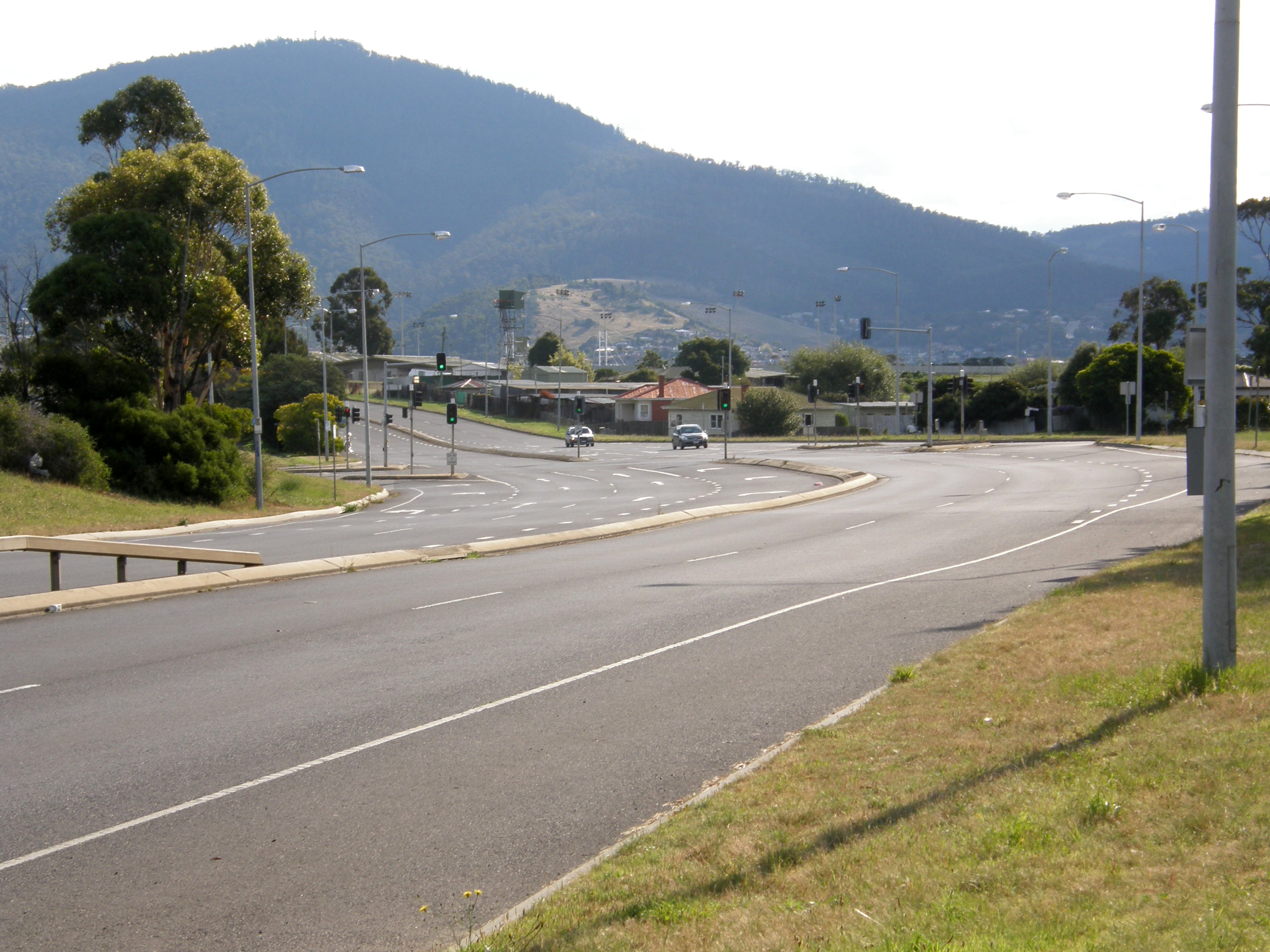

General information
- Type: Road
- Length: 3.2 km (2.0 mi)
- Opened: 1984
- Route number(s): B35

Major junctions
- West end: Brooker Highway Glenorchy, Tasmania
- East end: East Derwent Highway Otago, Tasmania

Location(s)
- Region: Hobart
- Major suburbs: Goodwood, Dowsing Point

Goodwood Road (Route B35) is a 4-lane link road that connects the City of Glenorchy to the City of Clarence in the greater area of Hobart, Tasmania. Using the Bowen Bridge the road travels over the River Derwent in semi-highway road layout. The road starts 10 km north of the Hobart CBD near the Hobart Showground on the Brooker Highway at Glenorchy, from there it travels east past the Elwick Racecourse, over the Bowen Bridge and connects to the East Derwent Highway at Otago. While the route the road takes is used far less than other major arterial roads in Hobart, commuters often depend on the road when major incidents occur on other major roads throughout Hobart.

The Wilkinsons Point and Elwick Bay master plan indicates plans to upgrade the traffic lights at Loyd Road to a roundabout to improve the overall traffic flow of Loyd Road.

The Tasmanian Department of Infrastructure, Energy and Resources proposes to re-align Goodwood Road with Elwick Road, reducing confusion and the number of traffic lights on the Brooker Highway.

== See also ==
- List of highways in Hobart
