= Railway Roundabout, Hobart =

Googie-themed fountain roundabout in Hobart, Tasmania

Coordinates: 42.878°S 147.331°E

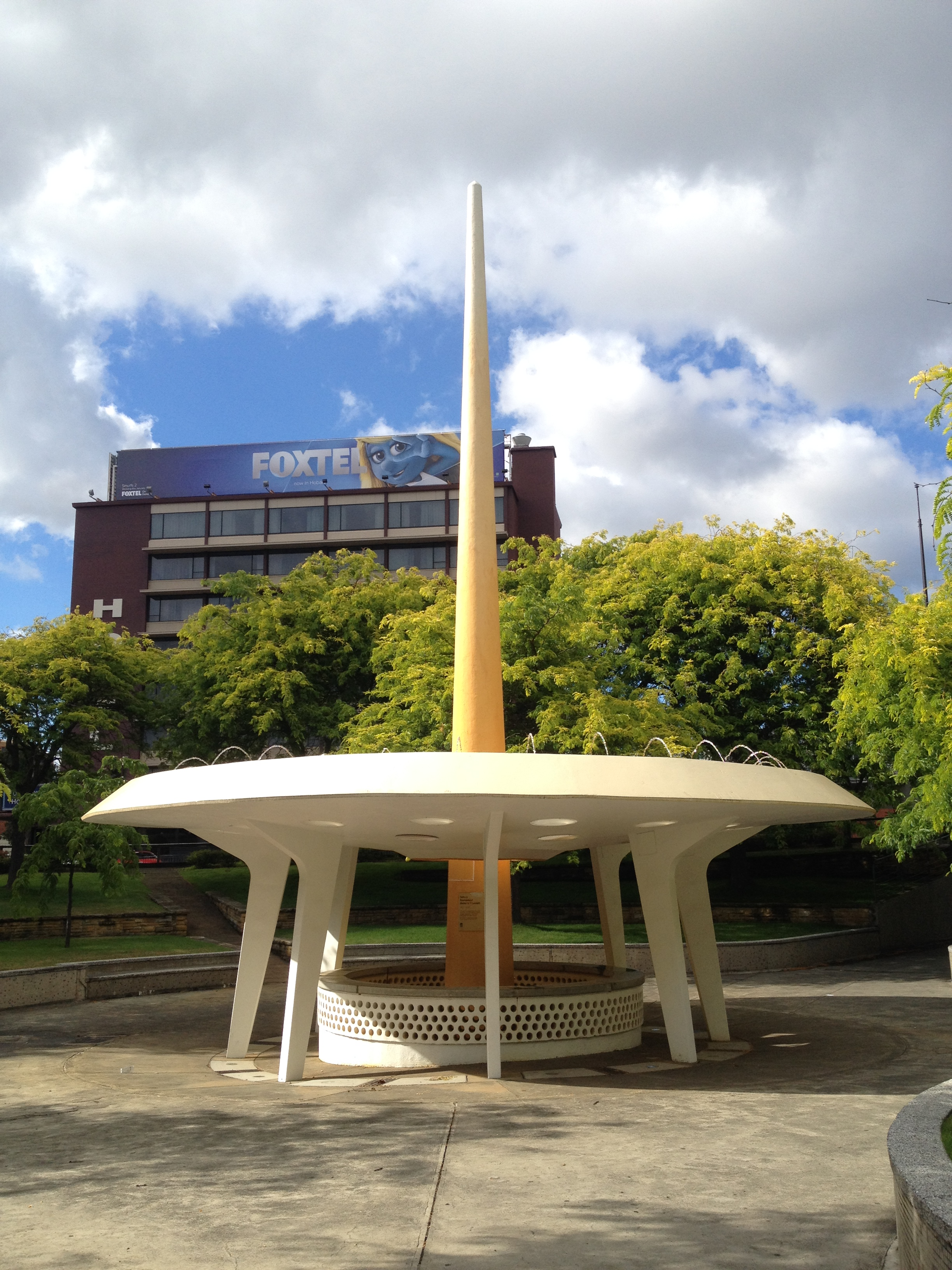
The fountain in the centre of Railway Roundabout

Railway Roundabout is a three-lane roundabout in Hobart, Tasmania. It is located on the Brooker Highway, at the top of Liverpool Street. It was originally built for the city's main railway station.

At the centre of the roundabout is a fountain built in 1963. It was restored in 2013 after having been out of service for more than a decade.

Railway Roundabout is the worst accident blackspot in Tasmania.

In 2015, the Roundabout Appreciation Society awarded Railway Roundabout their "one-way gyratory accolade".
