= Tasman Bridge =

Highway bridge over the River Derwent in Hobart, Tasmania, Australia

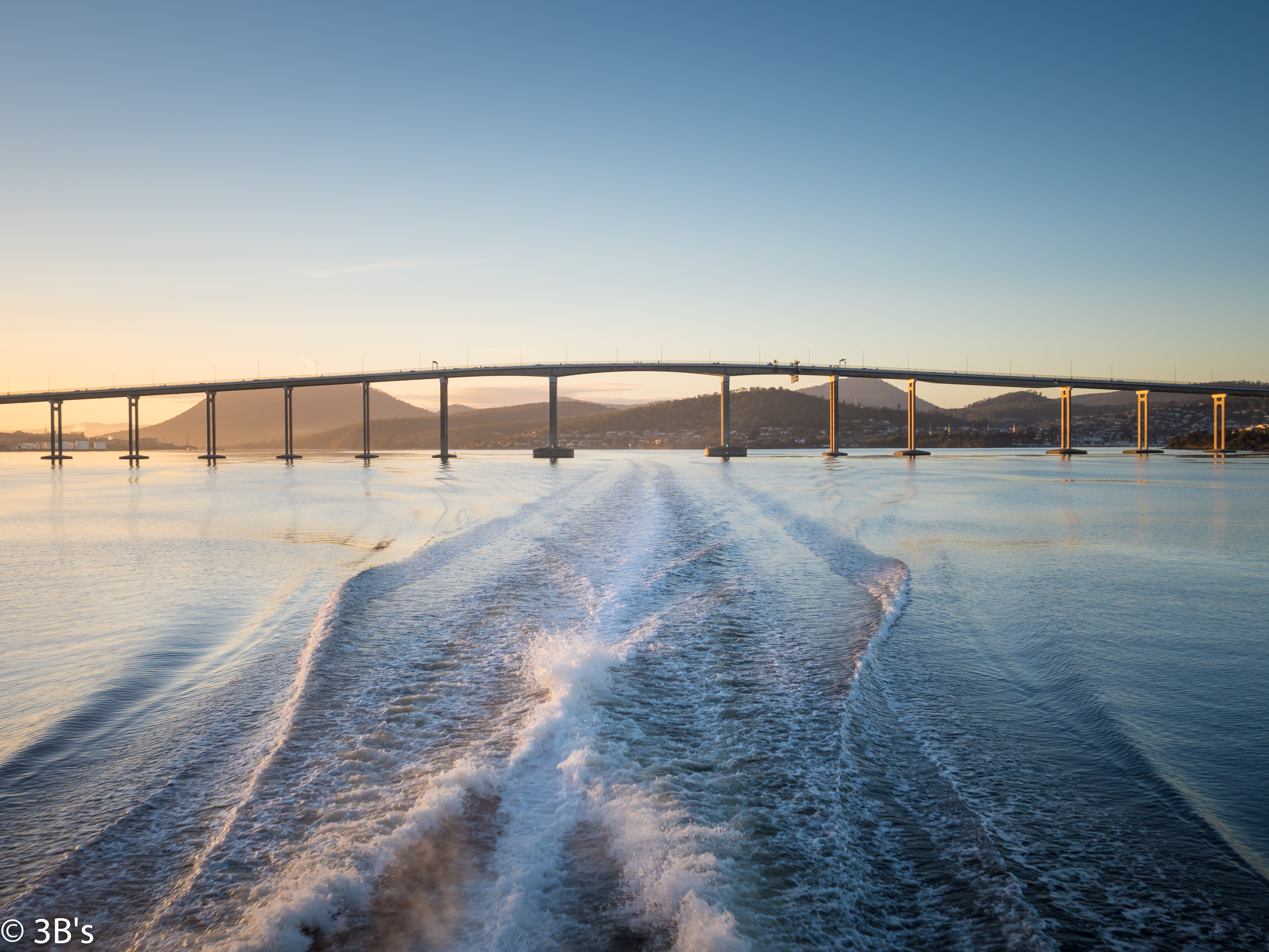
- Coordinates: 42°51′54″S 147°20′33″E
- Carries: Tasman Highway
- Crosses: River Derwent
- Locale: Hobart, Tasmania, Australia
- Maintained by: Building Tasmania

Characteristics
- Design: Prestressed concrete girder bridge
- Total length: 1,395 metres (4,577 ft)
- Width: 17.5 metres (57 ft)
- Height: 60.5 metres (198 ft)
- Longest span: 95 metres (312 ft)
- Clearance below: 46 metres (151 ft)
- No. of lanes: 5

History
- Constructed by: Reed & Mallik
- Fabrication by: Braithwaite & Co.
- Construction start: May 1960; 66 years ago
- Construction end: 23 December 1964; 61 years ago
- Opened: 18 August 1964; 62 years ago (2 lanes); 23 December 1964; 61 years ago (4 lanes); 29 March 1965; 61 years ago (official); 8 October 1977; 49 years ago (reopened)

Statistics
- Daily traffic: 73,029 (May 2019)

Location
- Interactive map of Tasman Bridge

The Tasman Bridge is a prestressed concrete girder bridge carrying the Tasman Highway over the River Derwent in Hobart, Tasmania, Australia. When it opened on 29 March 1965, it was the longest prestressed concrete bridge in Australia, with a total length of 1,396 metres (4,580 ft), including approaches. The bridge provides a vital link between the Hobart central business district on the western shore and the City of Clarence on the eastern shore. Averaging around 73,000 vehicle crossings per day, it carries the highest traffic volume of any road section in Tasmania. It features five lanes of traffic, including a central reversible lane, and grade-separated shared-use walkways on both sides, with ramp upgrades for improved access and cyclists completed in 2010.

The bridge gained national attention following the Tasman Bridge disaster. On 5 January 1975, it was struck by the bulk ore carrier SS Lake Illawarra, bound for EZ Industries’ Risdon Zinc Works with a cargo of 10,000 tonnes (11,000 short tons) of zinc concentrate. The impact caused two piers and three sections of concrete decking totalling 127 metres (417 ft) to collapse, sinking the vessel and resulting in the loss of twelve lives. The disaster split the city in half, forcing commuters on the eastern shore to make a 50-kilometre (31 mi) detour via the next bridge to the north. The event was notable as no comparable study of a city divided by such an incident existed at the time. After two and a half years, the bridge reopened on 8 October 1977. The Bowen Bridge was later constructed to provide redundancy in case of any future disruption to the Tasman Bridge.

Ongoing upgrades have sought to improve safety, lighting, and accessibility for cyclists and pedestrians, ensuring the bridge continues to meet contemporary transport standards.

== History ==
During the 1950s, Hobart's eastern shore underwent substantial expansion due to the opening of the Hobart Airport at Cambridge in 1956. By 1957, the airport was the country's fifth busiest, and the surge in air travel, associated automobile usage and surrounding developments led to a notable rise in traffic, overwhelming the capacity of the existing Hobart Bridge. With its single carriageway struggling to manage escalating traffic volumes and frequent disruptions due to the lifting of the bridge's lift span for passing ships, a necessity emerged for a novel bridge solution. These challenges highlighted the pressing need for a new, more accommodating bridge designed specifically for the increased traffic flow without constant interruptions for maritime navigation.

=== Design ===
In 1956, Tasmania's Department of Public Works commissioned Maunsell & Partners Pty Ltd to design the new River Derwent crossing. The stable foundation for the bridge was ensured by the favorable conditions of the riverbed between Queens Domain and Montagu Bay on the eastern shore, which includes bedrock, dolerite, and basalt beneath the silt. The engineers recommended a bridge supported by multiple piers due to the width of the water expanse, similar to that of the Sydney Harbour Bridge but requiring a comparable height to accommodate medium-sized cargo vessels. Consequently, a decision was made to construct a girder bridge featuring twenty-two spans, including a navigation span at its apex, with thirteen spans to the west and six spans to the east, each measuring 42.7 meters (140 ft) wide. To achieve the height of the 60.5-metre (198 ft) apex, a large sequence of interval spans were required to accommodate the weight of concrete for each heightened pier, with the deepest pile measuring 81 metres (265 ft) below mean sea level.

Criticism of Premier Eric Reece arose in 1958 when concerns were raised by engineers about the susceptibility of the concrete design to potential ship collisions. Investigative reports revealed Reece's dismissal of objections during parliamentary proceedings in favor of the $14 million project over a slightly more expensive suspension bridge option.

The bridge was originally built to a design life of about 100 years. (Note: No publicly accessible engineering document has been found which explicitly states that the 1975 disaster revised this figure.)

=== Construction ===
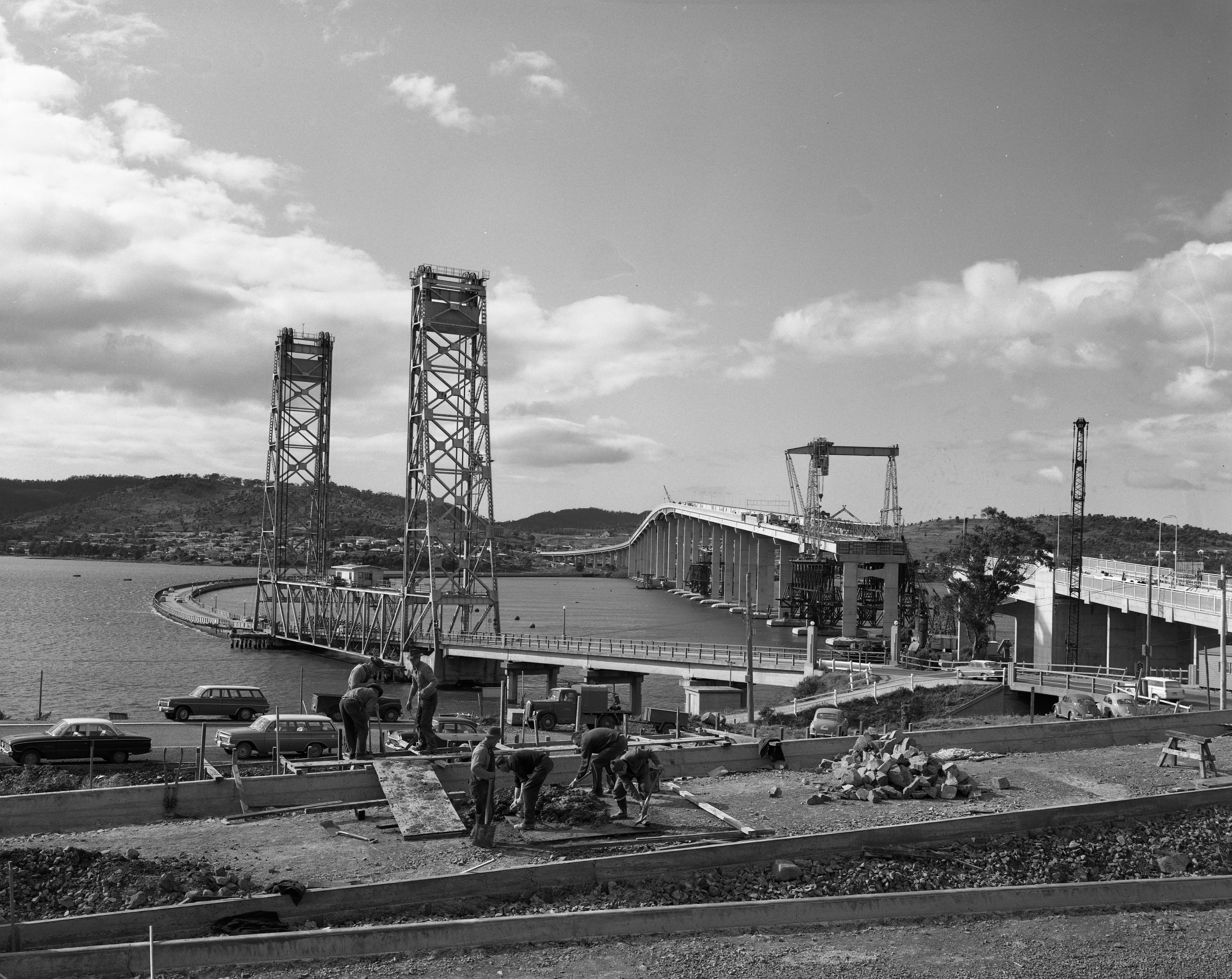
The Tasman Bridge under construction, while the Hobart Bridge remains in place (1964)

Tenders were issued in April 1959, and contracts were subsequently awarded to Reed, Braithwaite, Stuart, and Lipscombe in November of the same year. Construction on the eastern shore viaduct commenced in May 1960. A labour force of over 400 workers were employed during peak construction.

Several prerequisites were crucial during construction. The old Hobart Bridge had to remain operational until the Tasman Bridge's completion, and shipping lanes along the River Derwent needed to stay open. The construction posed significant challenges for Hobart as it marked the city's largest and most expensive undertaking to date. Procuring construction equipment, such as jacks and wires, required sourcing from the UK, while reinforced steel had to be imported from the Australian mainland, contributing to the bridge's elevated cost, totaling £7 million, equivalent to $14 million in 2015.

The first two lanes bridge opened on 18 August 1964. The other two lanes opened on 23 December 1964. It was officially opened on 29 March 1965 by Prince Henry, Duke of Gloucester. Upon completion, the Tasman Bridge was the longest prestressed concrete bridge in Australia, utilising 46,000 tonnes (45,000 LT) of concrete and 5,300 tonnes (5,200 LT) of reinforcement steel.

== Disaster ==
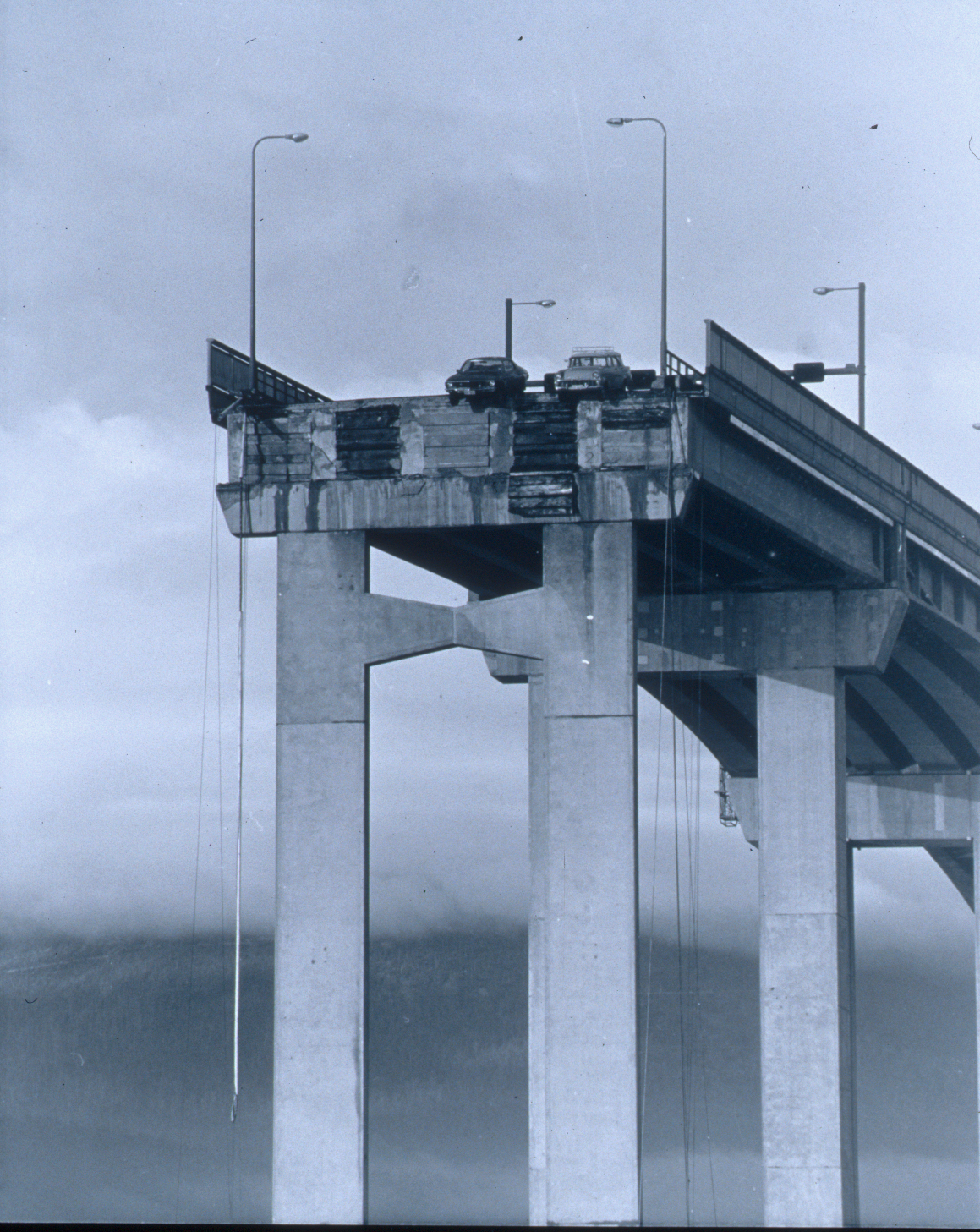
The Tasman Bridge after the collision

On 5 January 1975, the SS Lake Illawarra, a 140-metre (460 ft) bulk ore carrier, collided bow first with the pile capping of Pier 19 and then amidships with Pier 18 while en route to EZ Industries' Risdon Zinc Works with a cargo of 10,000 tonnes (9,800 long tons; 11,000 short tons) of zinc concentrate. These successive impacts led to the collapse of both piers, their supporting pylons, and three unsupported sections of the bridge deck spanning 127 metres (417 ft), causing the vessel to sink and resulting in the deaths of seven crew members. Five motorists lost their lives when four cars drove over the collapsed sections before traffic was halted. A major press shot showed a Holden Monaro HQ and Holden EK perched balancing on the ledge.

The breakage of an important arterial link isolated the residents in Hobart's eastern suburbs – the relatively short drive across the Tasman Bridge to the city suddenly became a 50-kilometre (31 mi) journey via the estuary's next bridge at Bridgewater. The only other vehicular crossing within Hobart after the bridge collapsed was the Risdon Punt, a cable ferry which crossed the river from East Risdon and Risdon, some five kilometres (3.1 mi) upstream from the bridge. It was totally inadequate, carrying only eight cars on each crossing, and although ferries provided a service across the river; it was not until December 1975 that a two lane, 788-metre-long (2,585 ft) bailey bridge was opened to traffic, two kilometres (1.2 mi) to the north from Dowsing Point to Cleburne Point thereby restoring some connectivity. The bailey bridge remained in use until replaced by the Bowen Bridge in 1984.

The separation of Hobart saw an immediate surge in the small and limited passenger ferry service then operating across the river. In a primary position to provide a service were the two ferries of Bob Clifford. He had introduced the locally-built ferries Matthew Brady and James McCabe to the river crossing, from the Hobart central business district to the eastern shore, shortly before the collision. These were soon joined by the MV Cartela, a wooden vessel of 1912 vintage, and Kosciusko, Lady Ferguson and Lady Wakehurst that were loaned by the New South Wales Public Transport Commission.

Following the Tasman Bridge Disaster, former-Premier Eric Reece maintained his defence of the chosen bridge design. Reece argued that the selected design was the sole financially viable option for the state at that time, despite the construction costs doubling throughout the project's execution.

=== Reconstruction ===
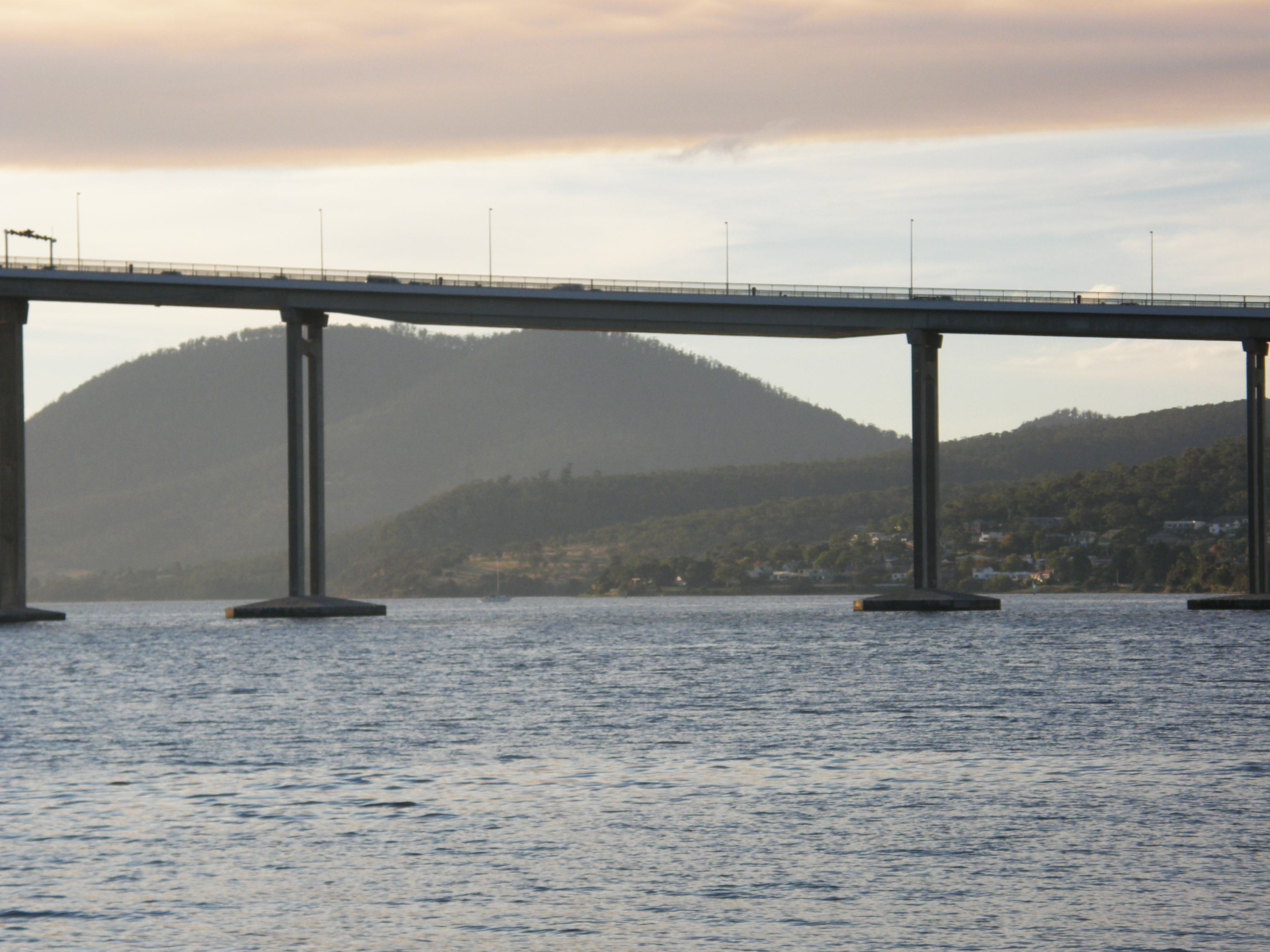
The repaired steel span between piers 17 and 19

Reconstruction of the Tasman Bridge by John Holland commenced in October 1975. Due to the amount of debris at the foundations, engineers decided not to rebuild Pier 18. Pier 17 on the western side of the gap was reinforced, and the pile cap and shaft of the pier above water level were replaced. A new pier was built at the site of the decimated Pier 19, and the existing Pier 20, on the eastern side of the gap, was repaired and strengthened. A new span, about 85.5 metres (281 ft) long, was built in steel box girder construction between piers 17 and 19, and another new, prestressed concrete span, about 42.5 metres (139 ft) meters long, was built from the new Pier 19 to Pier 20.

The annual expenditures on the Tasman Bridge reconstruction were $1.7 m in 1974–75; $12.3 m in 1975–76; $13.2 m in 1976–77 and $6.1m in 1977–78. After two and half years and an approximate cost of $44 million, the Tasman Bridge reopened to the public on 8 October 1977.

Following the reopening of the bridge, the Port of Hobart implemented additional maritime safety measures, including directing large vessels to navigate slightly west of the original main navigation span and providing specialised training to harbour pilots in the use of a laser lighthouse for navigation. Additionally, the City of Hobart configured traffic systems to temporarily halt all road traffic when large vessels approach and pass under the bridge.

== Wreck of SS Lake Illawarra ==
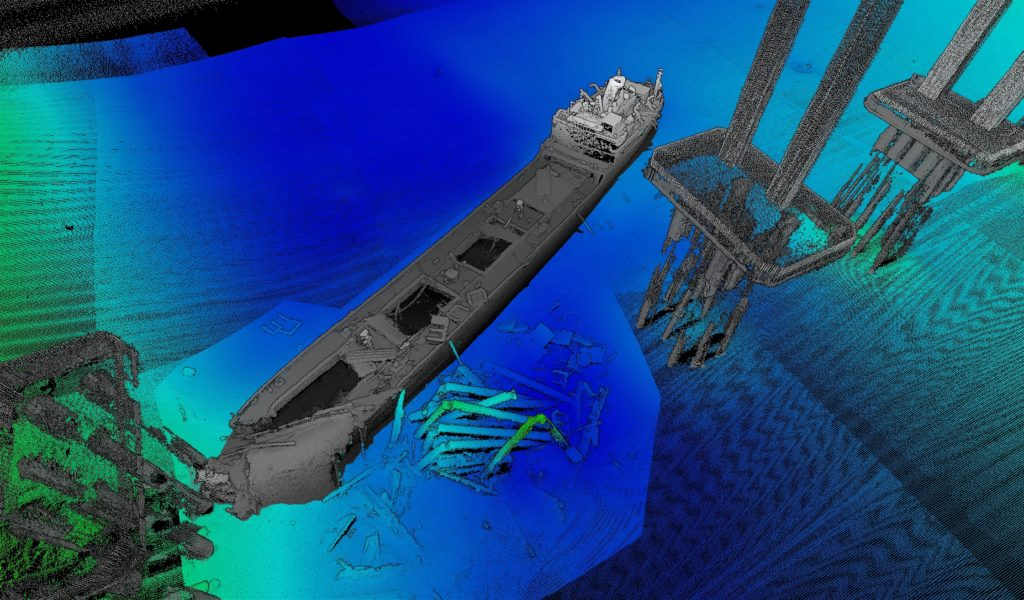
Bathymetric modelling of the wreck compiled by the CSIRO in 2022

The average depth of the river between piers 17 and 19 is 35 metres (115 ft), with the wreck of the SS Lake Illawarra lying on the bottom covered by a scattering of concrete debris, presenting no navigational hazard to smaller watercraft. 10,000 tonnes (9,800 long tons; 11,000 short tons) of zinc concentrate remain in the vessel's cargo hold.

The wreck attracts regular visits from divers. In 2019, the Tasmanian University Dive Club shared underwater footage of the wreck on social media. This footage, championed as the clearest footage ever captured, was attributed by the Derwent Estuary Program to decreased sediment levels in the River Derwent, a result of improved stormwater management measures in the city.

In 2022, the CSIRO and Jacobs Engineering Group collaborated to produce the first complete 3D model of the wreck, bridge, riverbed, and shoreline. The mapping unveiled the ship's placement adjacent to the bridge between piers 17 and 19 on the eastern shore, with its bow near Pier 19, angled at 45 degrees toward the centre of the river. The vessel's bow lies roughly 15 metres (49 ft) below the waterline, around 125 metres (410 ft) from the eastern shore.

== Upgrades ==
=== Addition of fifth lane ===
The bridge deck was widened to accommodate a fifth traffic lane during the bridge's 1975 reconstruction. Utilising a Japanese construction method dubbed the "Nippon clip-on," the central lane incorporates a reversible lane management system for tidal flow operations.

==== Tidal flow operations ====
Designed to optimise vehicle flow throughout the day, the reversible lane operates with a traffic light system and a sign above each lane. These signs, working in tandem with the traffic lights, utilise a pulley system to periodically shift over their respective lanes. During morning peak hours, the middle lane directs traffic towards the city side (or western shore), while during evening peak hours, it points back towards the eastern shore. Outside of peak hours, the lane generally directs traffic towards the eastern shore. This adaptable lane configuration maximises the bridge's capacity and reduces congestion by efficiently utilising lanes according to current traffic demand.

=== LED lighting ===
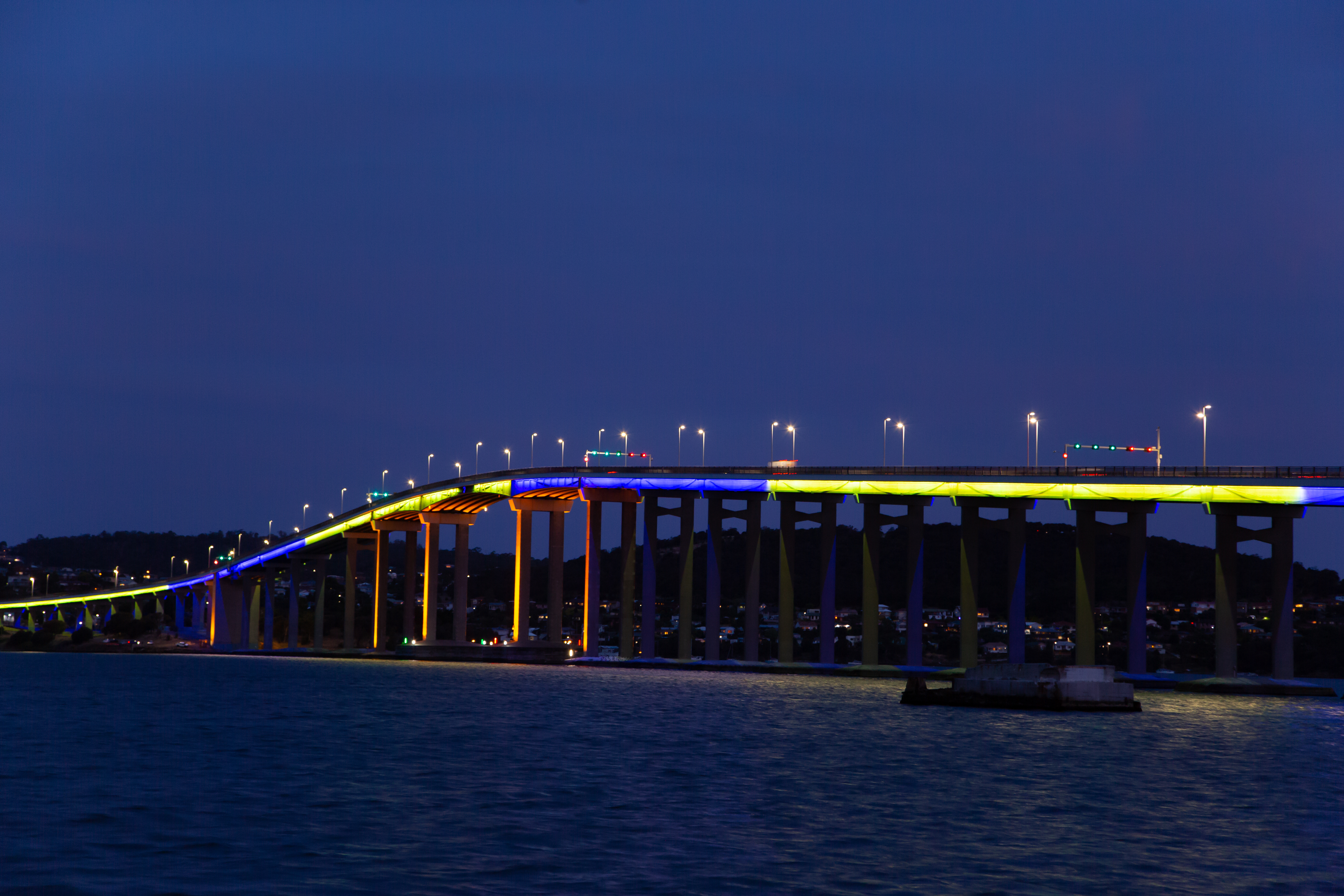
Tasman Bridge lit up in solidarity for Ukraine on the anniversary of the Russian invasion of Ukraine

In 2019 the Hobart City Council commissioned Decrolux to convert the Tasman bridge's fluorescent lighting with modern LED lighting. Spanning almost 3 kilometres (1.9 mi) and utilising 1,930 LEDs, the project was completed in 2021. These remotely programmable lights have been utilized for various purposes, including commemorating annual events such as Dark Mofo and the TasPride parade, supporting sports teams like the Hobart Hurricanes and Tasmania JackJumpers, marking special occasions like the inauguration of Queen Mary of Denmark, and raising awareness for causes such as Women's Health Week and Men's Health Week.

=== Sensors ===
In 1987, a system of sensors to monitor river currents, tidal height and wind speed was installed by the authorities in the navigation channel beneath the bridge, to assist vessel movements in the vicinity.

=== 2020s refurbishment ===
In June 2022, the Tasmanian transport ministry announced a A$130,000,000 investment in the Tasman Bridge: the largest since its 1977 reconstruction. Designed by GHD Group with a target completion date set for 2025, the project includes wider dedicated paths for cyclists and pedestrians, higher barriers separating vehicles and pedestrians, upgraded lighting, and digital signage. In September 2024, the Tasmanian Government announced that it had scrapped plans to widen the shared pathway, though it would proceed with installing new barriers and passing bays.

== Gallery ==
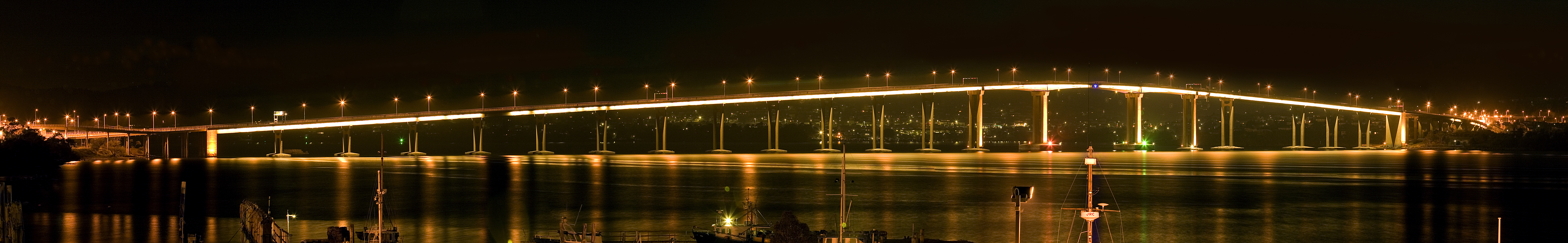
Panorama of the Tasman Bridge at night
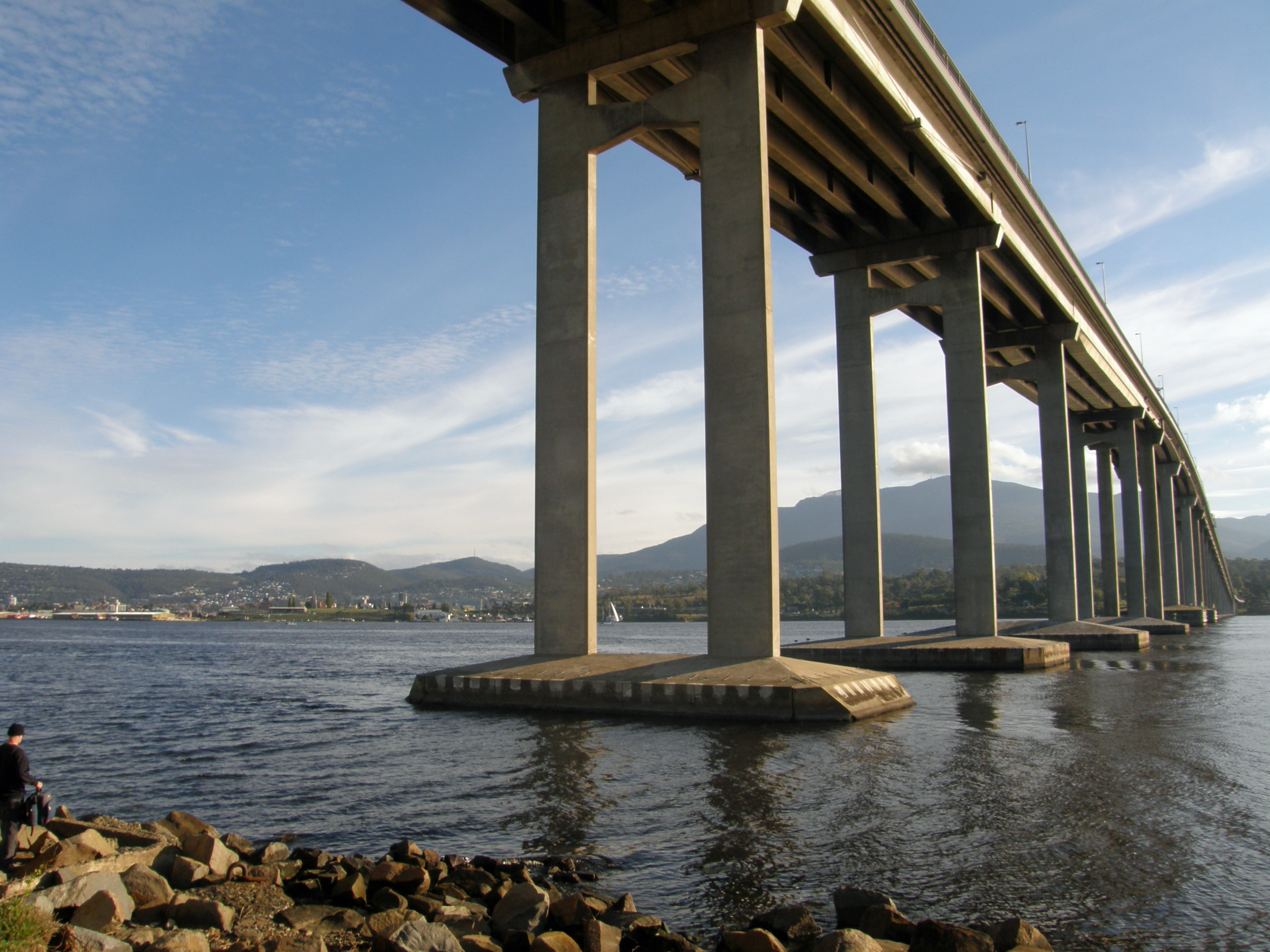
Tasman Bridge from the eastern shore

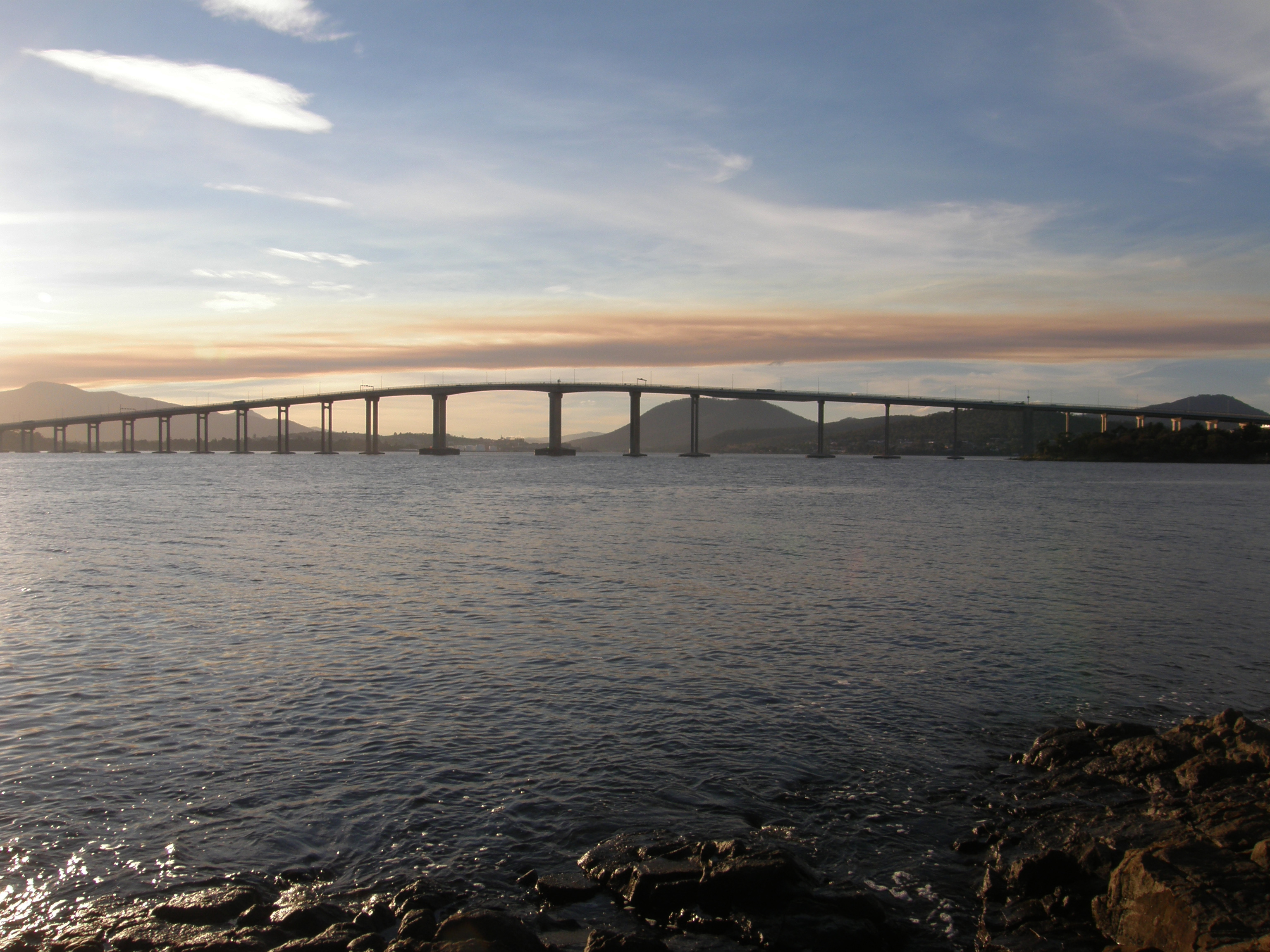
Looking towards the Tasman Bridge from Montagu Bay

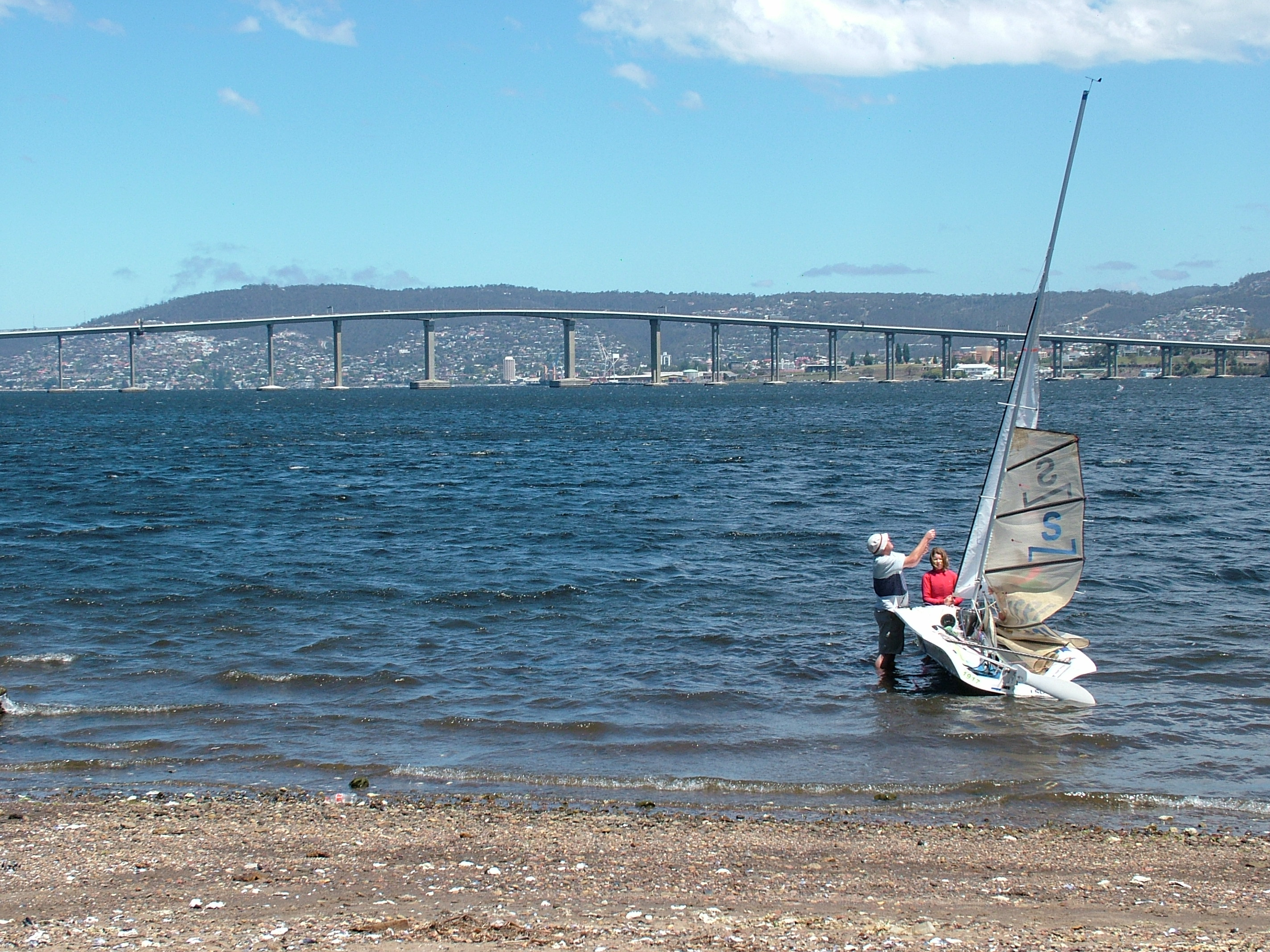
Dinghy and the bridge

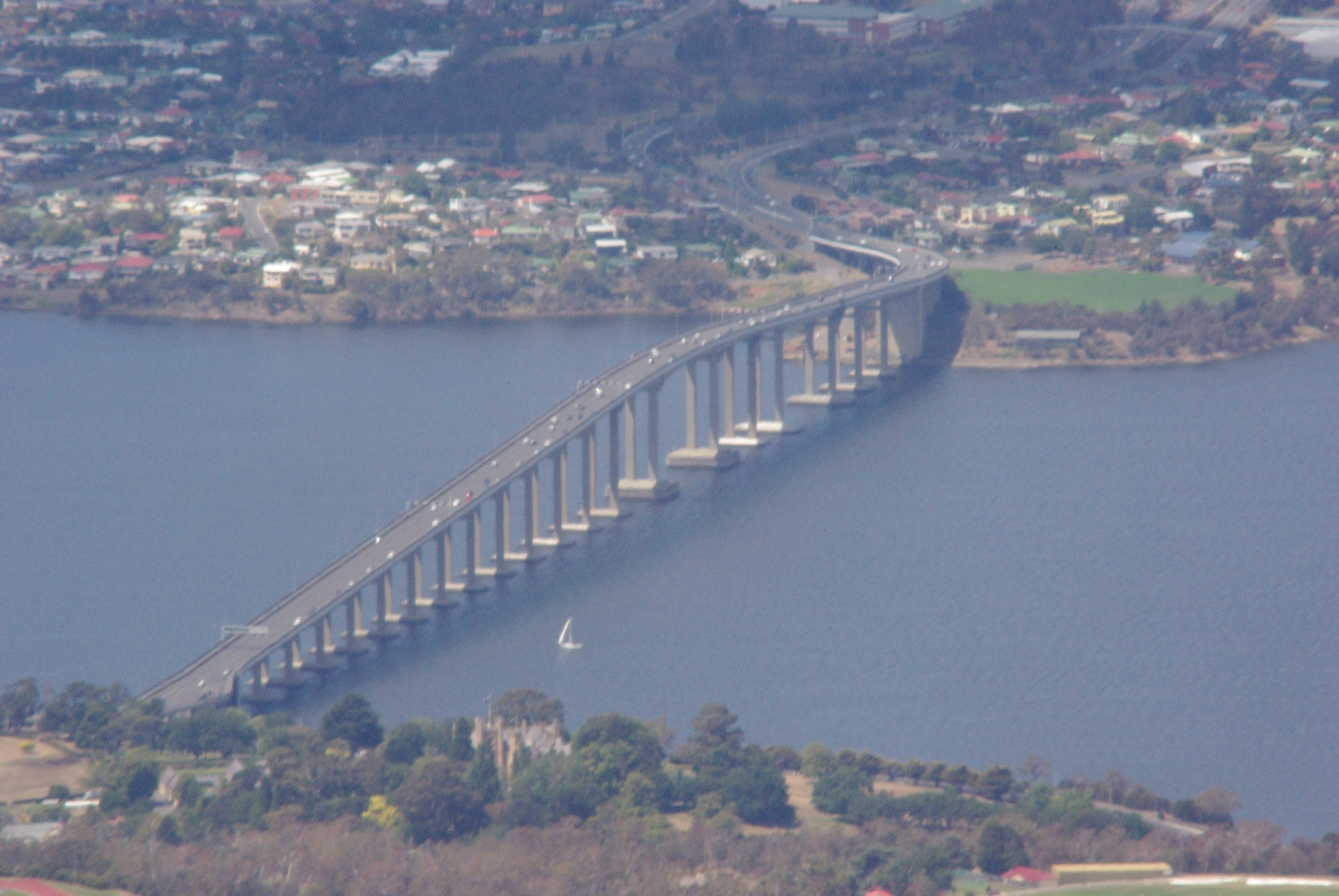
Tasman Bridge from Mount Wellington

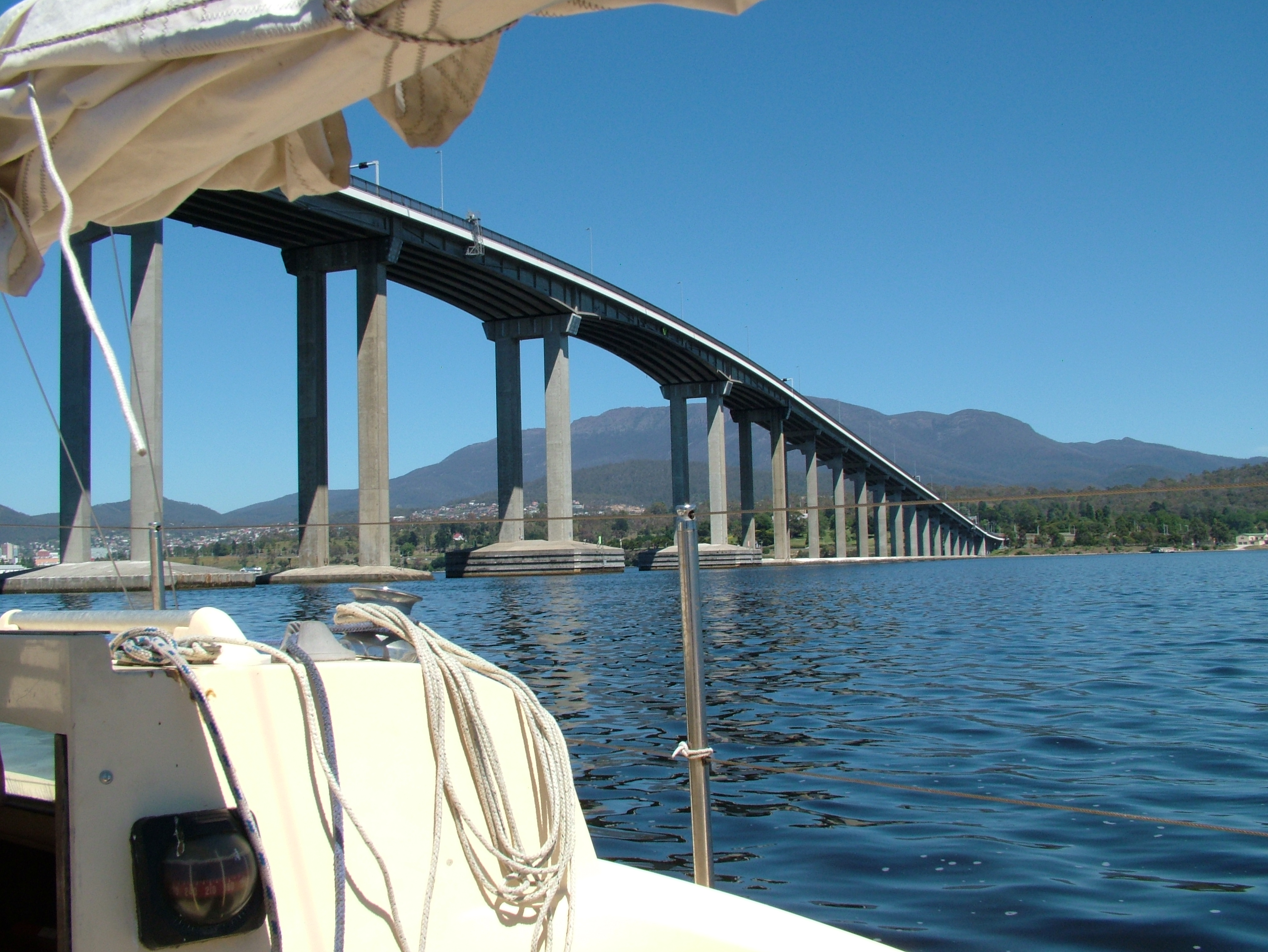
A view of the bridge from the river

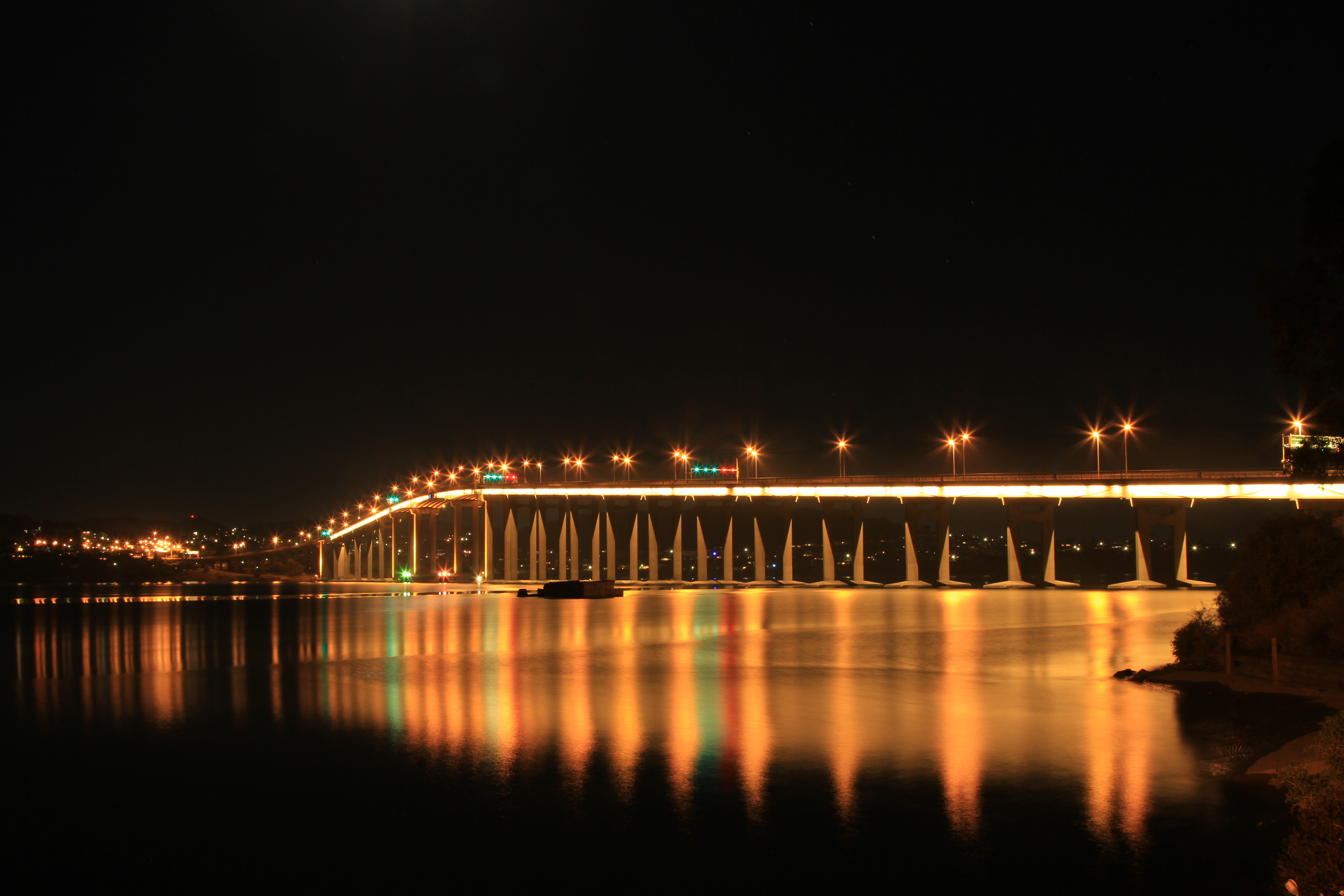
Tasman Bridge from the Western shore

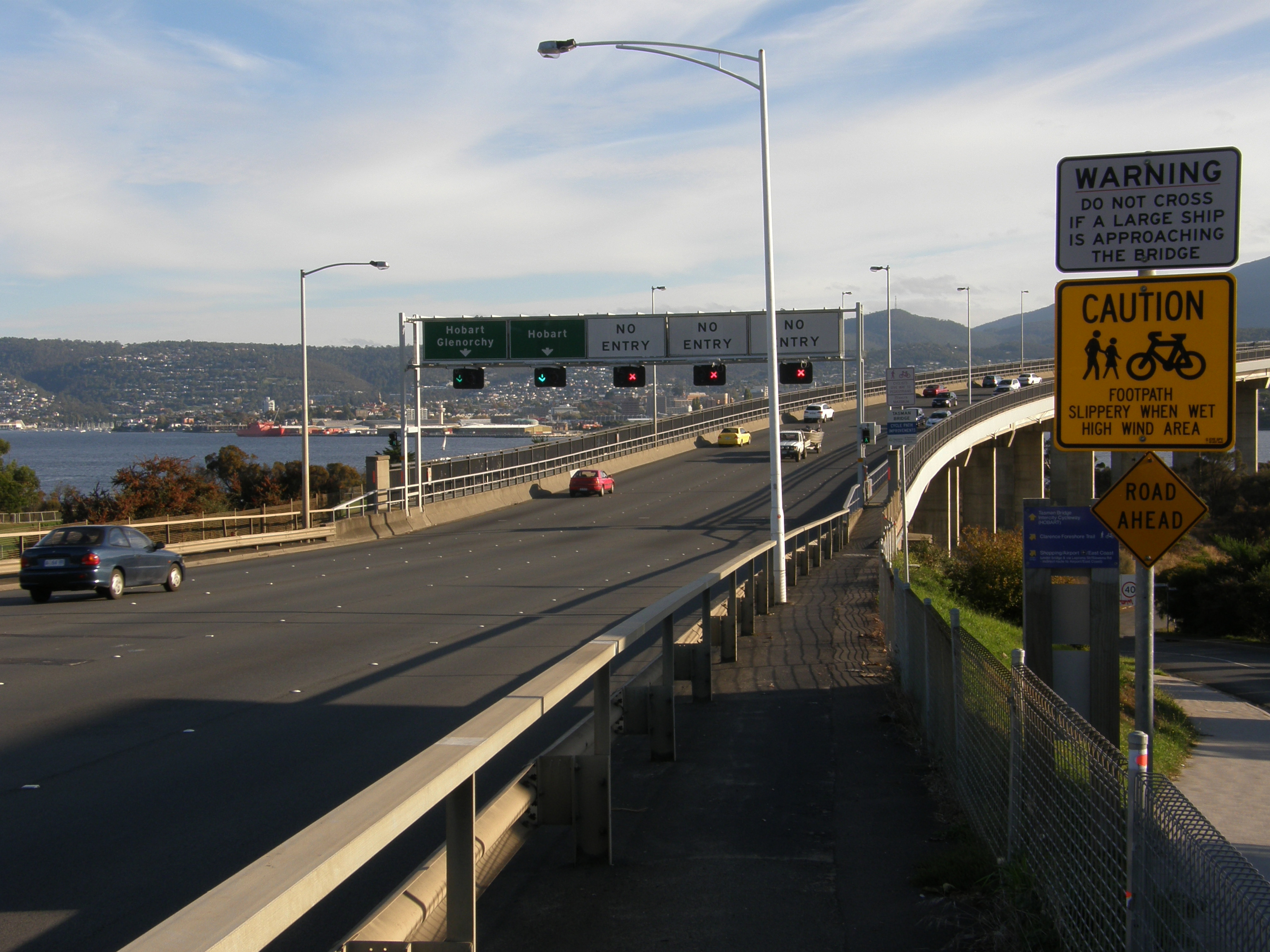
Entering the bridge from the eastern shore

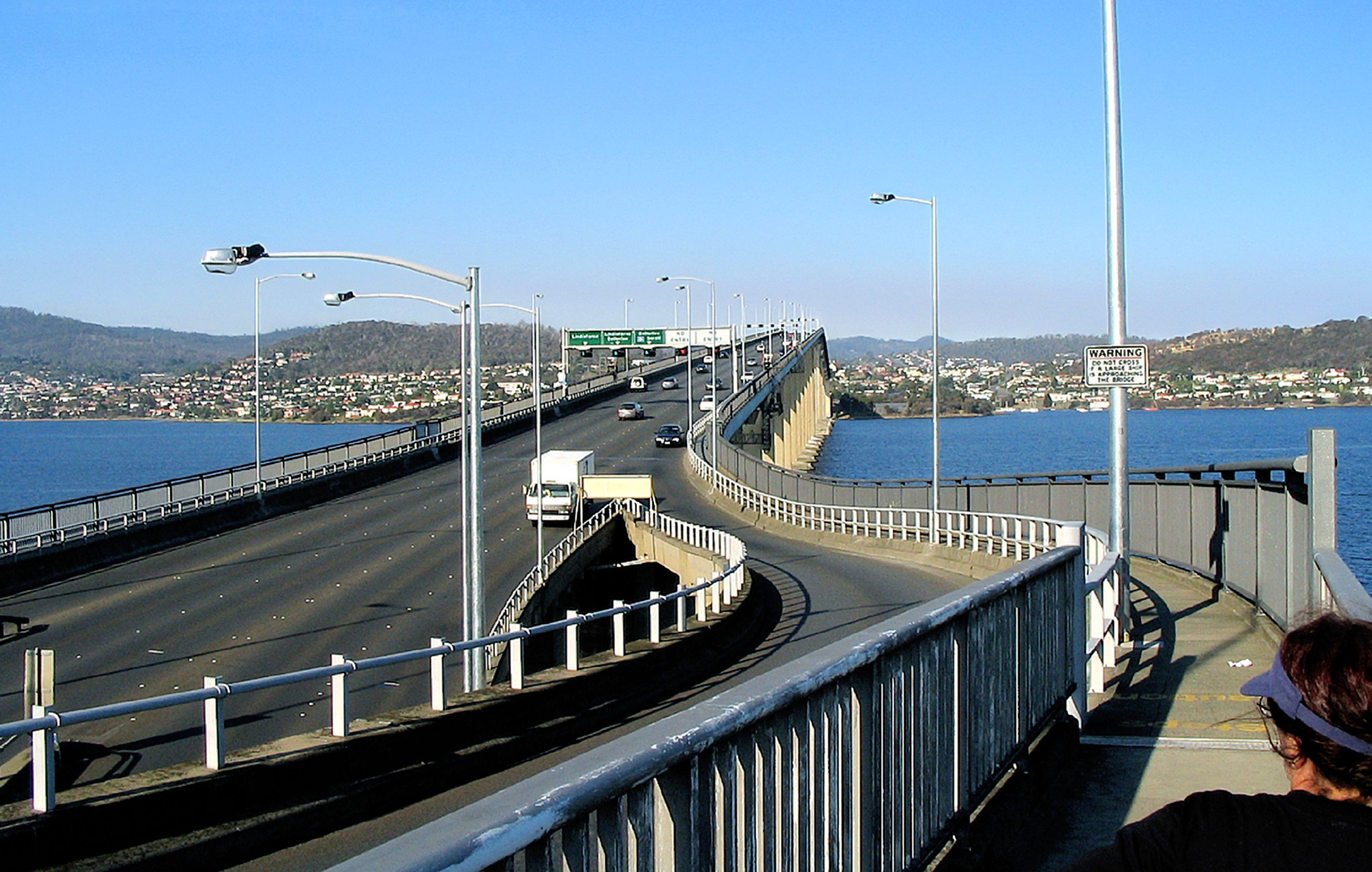
Entering the bridge from the west side

== See also ==
- List of bridges in Australia
- List of bridge failures
- List of disasters in Australia by death toll

== Sources ==
- Christensen, E.M.; Jones, M.C. (1997). Before They Built The Bridge: An Anecdotal History. Hobart, Tasmania: E.M. Christensen. ISBN 0-646-31945-0.
- Official Opening - The Tasman Bridge, Hobart (opening ceremony pamphlet) (Libraries Australia). Tasmania, Australia: Department of Public Works. 29 March 1965. 65392892.
- Tasman Bridge Construction (documentary film). Libraries Tasmania. 1965. Reference: AB869/1/2610 – via YouTube.
- Lewis, Tom (1999), By Derwent divided: the story of Lake Illawarra, the Tasman Bridge and the 1975 disaster, Tall Stories, ISBN 0-9577351-1-1
- Hensher, David A. (David Alan) (1977), Re-opening of the Tasman bridge: the effect on mode and route of travel for east-west travel, School of Economic and Financial Studies, Macquarie University, ISBN 978-0-85837-257-3
- Ludeke, Michael (2006), Ten events shaping Tasmania's history, Ludeke Publishing, ISBN 978-0-9579284-2-8
- Aplin, Neil; Transport Tasmania. Economic Planning and Research Division (1983), Feasibility of discharging bulk fuel tankers south of the Tasman Bridge, Economic Planning and Research Division, Transport Tasmania
- The Story of Two Bridges, Platypus Publications, 1965
