= Department of Infrastructure, Energy and Resources =

Former Tasmanian government department

The Department of Infrastructure, Energy and Resources (DIER) was the former name of the Tasmanian Government Department of State Growth. It reported to several ministers including Jim Cox and Michael Aird. On 1 July 2014, the Department of Economic Development, Tourism and the Arts was amalgamated with the department and the name was changed to the Department of State Growth.

The department was divided into divisions including a Corporate Services Division and the Office of the Secretary. In addition to its own Divisions, DIER also provided support to Private Forests Tasmania, Racing Services Tasmania, and Forest Practices Authority. The Executive Group (Senior Management Team) was made up of the Secretary, Deputy Secretaries, and the General Manager Corporate Services. Each Division of DIER had responsibilities for infrastructure for social and economic development in Tasmania.
