= List of highways in Hobart =

List of major highways, roads, and streets in Hobart, Tasmania

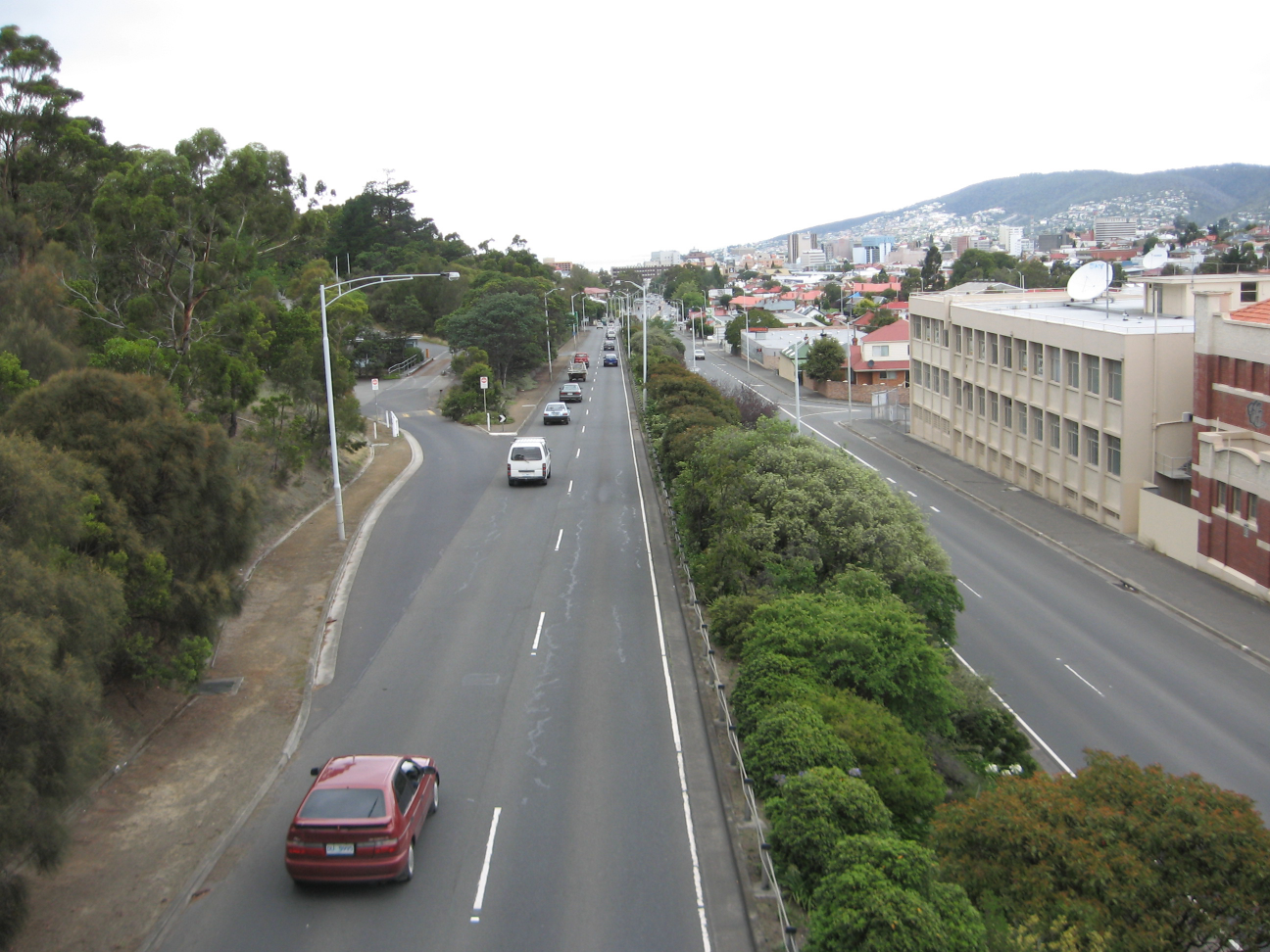
Brooker Highway

This is a list of highways, streets and roads in Hobart, Tasmania.

== Highways ==
- Brooker Highway
- Channel Highway (Kingston Bypass)
- Domain Highway
- East Derwent Highway
- Huon Highway
- Lyell Highway
- Midland Highway (Brighton Bypass)
- South Arm Highway
- Southern Outlet
- Tasman Highway

== Major Roads and Streets ==
- Algona Road
- Davey Street
- Goodwood Road
- Macquarie Street
- Sandy Bay Road
- Liverpool Street
- Main Road
- Brisbane Street
- New Town Road
