= Transport in Hobart =

The city of Hobart, Tasmania, Australia is served by a wide variety of transport. While the city's main form of transport is private transport on the road network, transport is also available by bus, ferry and aircraft. A suburban train service operated on the South line between Hobart and Brighton from the 1870s until 31 December 1974. There has been talk in the 21st century of reinstating a train service in the northern suburbs.

== Public transport ==
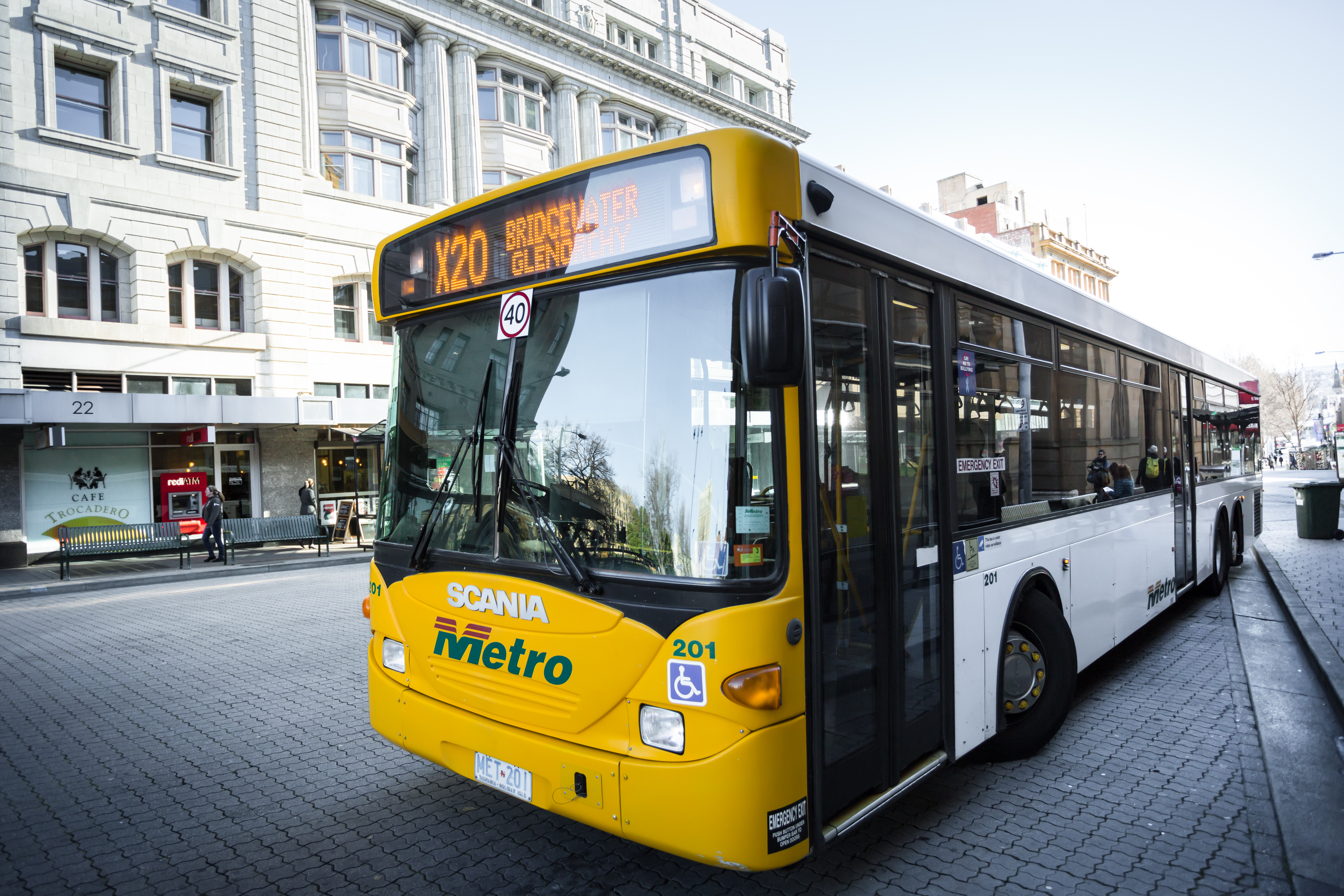
A Metro bus in Hobart

Public transport in Hobart has been provided exclusively by buses since 1968. Trams ran in Hobart from 1893 to 1960 and were briefly replaced by trolleybuses, from 1960 to 1968.

The low population density of Hobart has resulted in the creation of bus routes which cover a wide area and operate at a low frequency. The consequence is that bus travel is not competitive with travel by car, because routes are often lengthy and indirect, meaning that passengers can take a long time to reach their final destination. This has contributed to Hobart having the second-lowest public transport patronage in Australia.

Since the completion of the Brighton Transport Hub, the former South railway line through inner Hobart has fallen into disuse. Serious constraints in the road network, along with low-frequency bus services, have led to ongoing discussion of introducing Riverline light rail to Hobart. It would make use of the rail corridor, creating a new express route to Hobart.

Taxis and limousines operate with no ties to Metro. Taxi Combined and Yellow Cabs run the large fleets of taxicabs in Hobart.

== Bicycle ==
There are many bike tracks in the greater Hobart area, one of the most notable being the intercity bike track which runs from Hobart 12 km north to Glenorchy along an unused rail line of the Hobart–Bridgewater rail corridor. Other bike routes travel through Mount Wellington and the waterfront of the River Derwent at various locations.

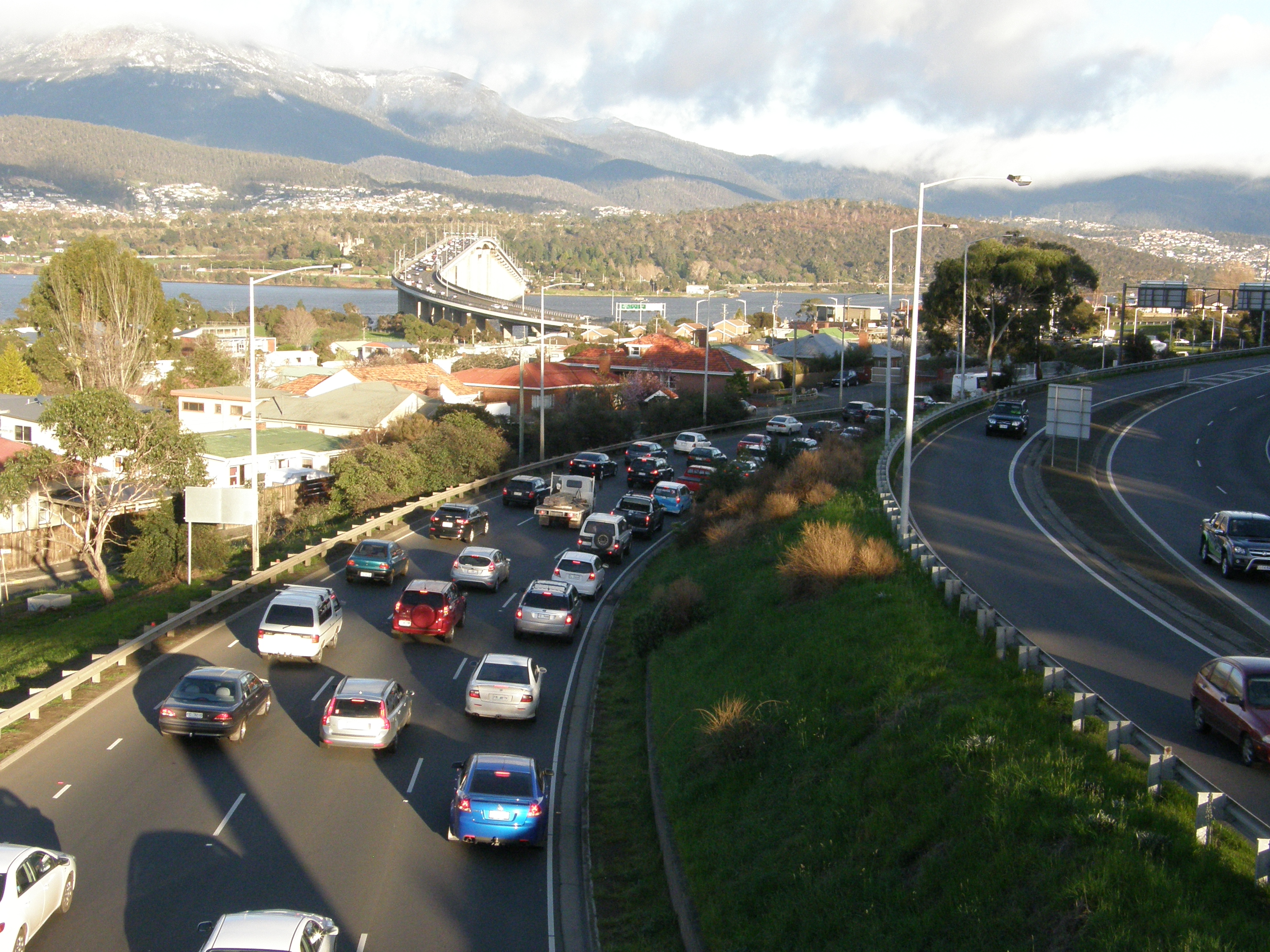
Traffic on the Tasman Highway

== Road ==
The release of the Hobart Area Transportation Study in 1964 has influenced the use of cars as the dominant mode of transport in Hobart. The Davey/Macquarie couplet expand east–west along the southern fringe of the city centre connecting the three major highways; the Southern Outlet, the Tasman Highway and the Brooker Highway which expand out to the outer suburbs. These highways are in turn supported by secondary arterial roads; Goodwood, Sandy Bay and Main Roads as well as the East Derwent and South Arm highways.

== Water ==
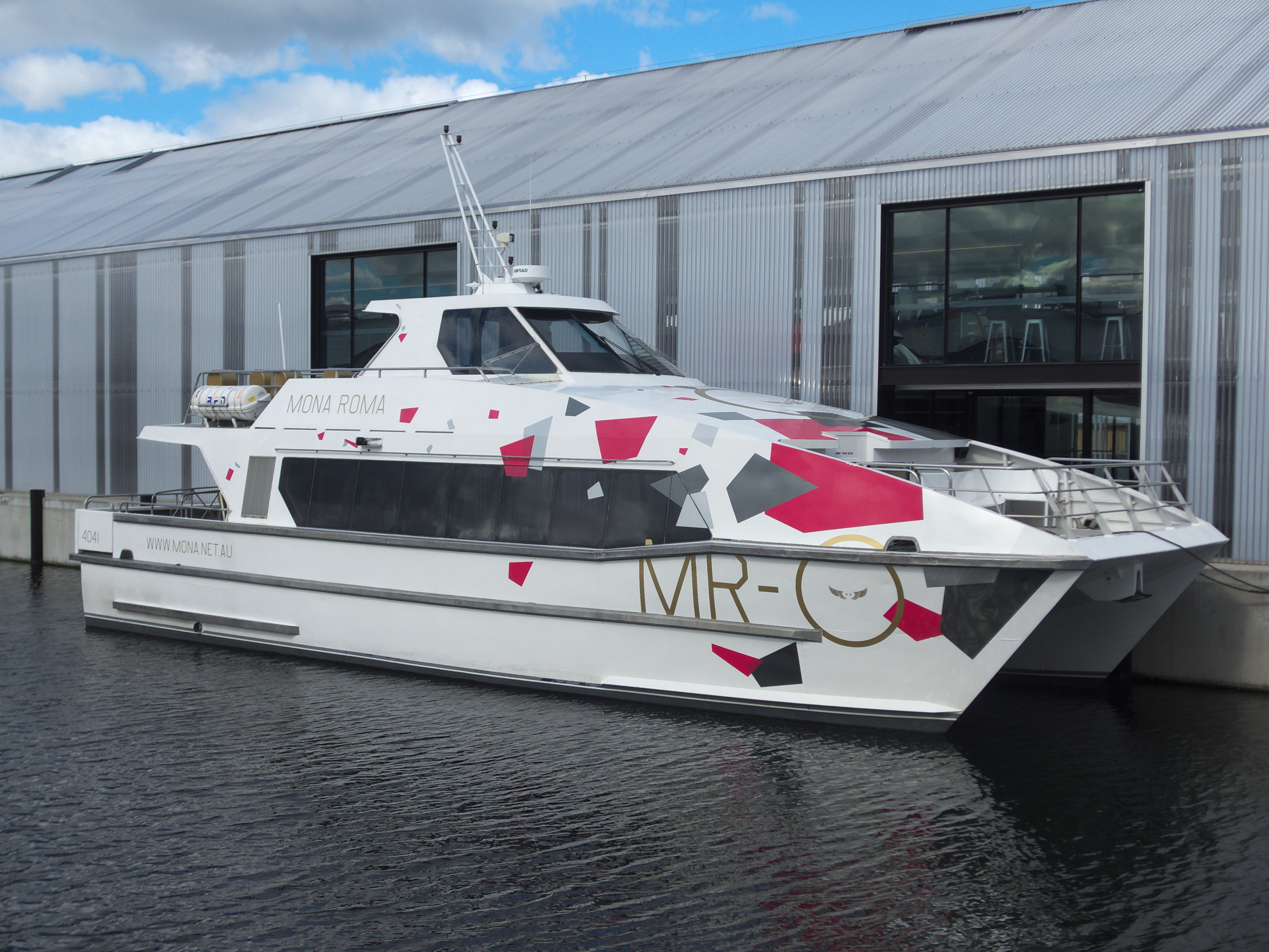
A Museum of Old & New Art ferry at Brooke Street Pier

Several private ferry operators run are based in Sullivans Cove for commuter, tourist and leisure purposes. Destinations include Port Arthur on the Tasman Peninsula, Peppermint Bay at Woodbridge, the eastern shore town centre of Bellerive, Wrest Point Hotel Casino in Sandy Bay, and Museum of Old & New Art in Berriedale.

Hobart has the second deepest natural port in the world, second to only Rio de Janeiro in Brazil. As a result, it sees an extensive cruise ship calendar, with approximately 30 ships berthing at Sullivans Cove between October and April each summer. Hobart has also hosted visiting United States Navy ships.

Hobart serves as Australia's main sea link to Antarctica for the Australian Antarctic Division, headquartered in Kingston. Hobart is the home port to the Australian Icebreaker the Aurora Australis which serves the Australian Antarctic Territory during the summer months. Hobart is also home to the French ship L'Astrolabe, which makes regular supply runs to the French Southern Territories located around Antarctica.

== Airports ==
Hobart Airport, in the suburb of Cambridge, is Tasmania's busiest airport. Three airlines and approaching two million domestic passengers utilise the airport each year. The airport is a hub for Skytraders, which operates chartered flights to Antarctica. Cambridge Aerodrome is situated in the same suburb and caters exclusively for general aviation and charter flights.
