= Hobart Bypass =

Former proposed concept to bypass the Hobart Central business district

Artist's impression of the Northside Freeway, proposed in 1965

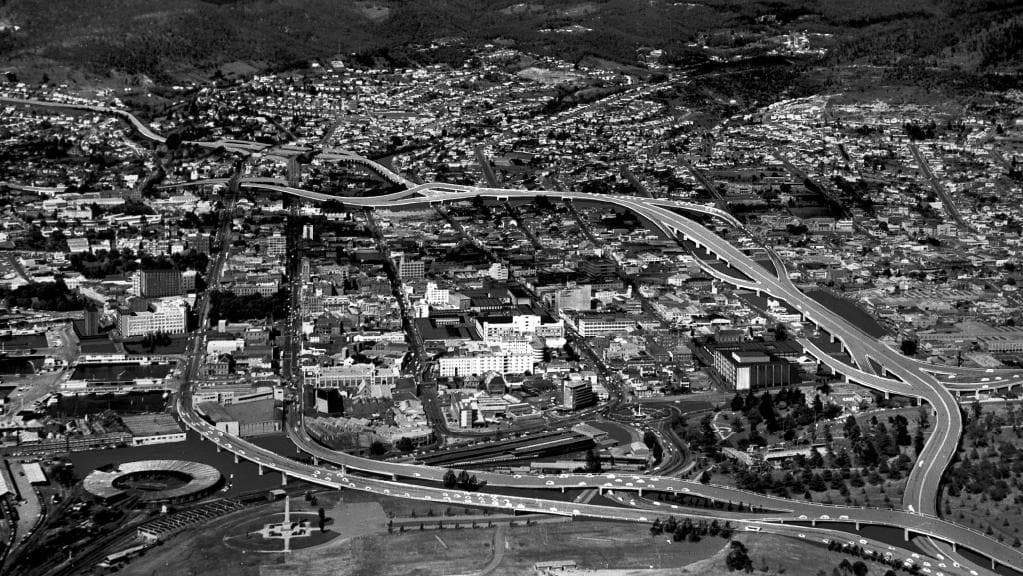
Image of Wilbur Smith & Associates 1965 plan

The Hobart Bypass was a proposed concept to bypass the Hobart central business district in Tasmania, Australia. Currently, through traffic travels from the Tasman and Brooker highways down the Davey/Macquarie one-way couplet to the Southern Outlet. As well as traffic concerns, there is also a call to build the bypass on the grounds that the current traffic arrangement cuts the central business district off from Hobart's waterfront.

== Current alignment ==
At present, traffic proceeding to/from the Southern Outlet must pass through the one-way couplet of Davey and Macquarie streets for access to the Tasman and Brooker highways. This current alignment was implemented in 1987 to coincide with the completion of the Sheraton. It was originally intended that the couplet system would serve as a stop gap measure prior to the construction of a freeway in the Hobart Area Transportation Study of 1965. Prior to this, all traffic in Hobart was 2-way.

== Bypass proposals ==
=== Northside Freeway ===
The Northside Freeway was one of several traffic solutions proposed by US transportation and infrastructure consulting firm Wilbur Smith and Associates in their Hobart Area Transportation Study of 1965. The proposed link was to extend from Grosvenor Street, Sandy Bay and the Southern Outlet at Davey Street and following the Hobart Rivulet and bypassing the CBD and crossing the Brooker Highway between Melville and Brisbane streets, passing through the Queens Domain and connecting to the Tasman Highway. The freeway was designed to be a raised freeway to avoid the sharp topographical features associated with the Queens Domain.

=== Cross-City Tunnels ===
There has since been several proposals for a tunnel under the city:

- Retired surveyor Max Darcey proposed a bored tunnel under Hobart connecting the Southern Outlet and the Tasman Bridge. Max's design was marked 'Tunnel Stage 1', 'Tunnel Stage 2', 'Alternative Stage 2' and 'Temporary through-traffic to Bridge (only if done in 2 stages)'. Tunnel Stage 1 arced north to north-westerly from the Southern Outlet to an interchange just north of Burnett Street on the north-eastern side of the Brooker Hwy. Tunnel Stage 2 continued the gentle arc to be aligned with the Tasman Bridge suggesting new on and off-ramps would be built to connect the tunnel and the bridge. Alternative Stage 2 swung more sharply easterly before curving northerly to merge with the Tasman Hwy. The proposal was supported by the Lord Mayor of Hobart from 2011 to 2014, Damon Thomas. This proposal was assessed in a July 2011 report by the Department of Infrastructure, Energy & Resources. They reported: 'Data shows that there will continue to be a need for a large proportion of traffic to access the CBD itself, therefore stage one of the proposed tunnel [from the Southern Outlet to the Brooker Hwy] is likely to only remove about 15% of the traffic on the Macquarie Davey couplet during the morning peak and 14% in the evening peak.'
- In 2018, retired civil engineer Tony Denne, urban geographer Bob Cotgrove and former head of treasury Don Challen advocated a very similar plan to Max Darcy's plan (Alternative Stage 2), except that in their version, the tunnels between the Southern Outlet and Burnett Street and between Burnett Street and the Tasman Hwy are straighter, and unlike Max's proposal, it would feature junctures at which vehicles could join or leave the road, allowing access from suburbs such as Sandy Bay, Lenah Valley, and North, West and South Hobart.
- A pair of two-lane one-way cut and cover tunnels under Davey/Macquarie Streets from the Brooker Hwy to the Southern Outlet.
- A single two-lane two-way cut and cover tunnel under Davey Street from the Brooker Highway to Sandy Bay Road.

=== Bypass on the eastern foothills of Knocklofty ===
This proposal was from Elboden Street via a bridge over Hobart Rivulet into a tunnel to Knocklofty Terrace to Pottery Road. Hobart transport economist Bob Cotgrove commented that this proposal was likely to be too peripheral to justify the expense.

=== Bypass on the western foothills of Knocklofty ===
In the past, a bypass of the CBD has been suggested from McRobies Gully, South Hobart via Knocklofty Park to Lenah Valley. It has been pointed out that this proposal would be virtually useless to anyone wanting to access the CBD from the northern suburbs due to the significant detour required through Cascade Rd.

=== Bypass behind Mount Wellington ===
Several councillors from the Huon Valley Council, the Derwent Valley Council and the Hobart City Council have advocated the upgrade of four-wheel drive tracks behind Mount Wellington between the Huon Valley and the Derwent Valley, stating that it would decrease Hobart through-traffic. However it is 28km from the Huon Valley Council chambers to the Derwent Valley Council chambers via the proposed route, which makes it by far the furthest of any of the proposals. It is also certainly the most peripheral and would be the least used of any of the proposals. In May 2015, a report by consulting company Jacobs Solutions stated that the proposed road provided only minor travel time savings, that accident rates would be higher and there would be a conflict between cars and trucks.

== Other options to reduce CBD traffic congestion ==
=== City-fringe car-parks ===
For example, a car-park near the Mcvilly underpass of the Tasman Highway that was cross-subsidised from CBD car-parks would remove some of the traffic that comes into the CBD via the Tasman Highway.

=== Ferry services ===
Hobart ferry builder Bob Clifford has suggested a network of 17 ferry terminals. The state government announced in 2017 that it was considering a single peak-hour ferry crossing from Kangaroo Bay to Sullivans Cove.

=== Utilise the rail corridor on the western shore of the River Derwent ===
Proposals include:

- Steam engines on the existing track.
- Replacing the existing narrow-gauge track on the South line with a standard gauge track with overhead electrification. This was costed at $100 million to Glenorchy by GHD and $200 million to Austins Ferry by ACIL Tasman.
- Conversion of the track to a tramway or busway. This was the preferred option of transport experts working for the Department of State Growth.

=== Prioritise pedestrians and encourage active transport ===
Hobart has built a network of bicycle tracks and recently commenced work on a pedestrian bridge across the Tasman Hwy just over a hundred metres from the existing underpass, with another planned for the Brooker Hwy a mere 50 metres or so from the existing pedestrian underpass. The Hobart City Council elected in 2014 appointed a five-member infrastructure committee made-up of four councillors who are aligned to the Tasmanian Greens. The Hobart City Council recently released a report advocating further measures to prioritise pedestrians and active transport. In 2010, Danish architect and urban designer Jan Gehl who was commissioned to write a report which similarly advocated a prioritisation of pedestrians. Since that report, Liverpool Street has been converted to one lane, making it more difficult for cars to drive around the Elizabeth Street Mall.

=== Improve the relative attractiveness of buses on the existing road network ===
- Offer free bus services in peak-hours on congested routes.
- Provide better shelters, possibly with heating in the winter in the morning peak hour at popular suburban bus stops and interchanges, and in the afternoon peak-hour at the CBD bus stops.
- Impose higher parking fees in a way designed to have maximum impact on peak-hour congestion, such as a surcharge for putting your car into or taking it out of a CBD car-park in peak-hours.
- Trade fixed price car registration for either slightly higher petrol prices and/or congestion-pricing of major arterial roads and the Tasman Bridge.
- More parking where feasible near popular bus stops and interchanges.

=== Macquarie Street bus lane ===
In early 2018 the Department of State Growth released a report drafted together with Jacobs Solutions to widen the Southern Outlet by one lane through the Macquarie Street and Davey Street intersections and to add a lane to Macquarie Street from Elboden Street to Murray Street. Under the proposal, Macquarie Street would become one-way between Elboden Street and Murray Street, and the Southern Outlet and the new lane would be reserved for buses and left-turning traffic. The same report also featured designs for a fifth lane (a reversible lane) for the Southern Outlet from Mount Nelson to Davey Street.
