= Argyle Street, Hobart =

Street in Hobart, Tasmania

Argyle Street Tasmania
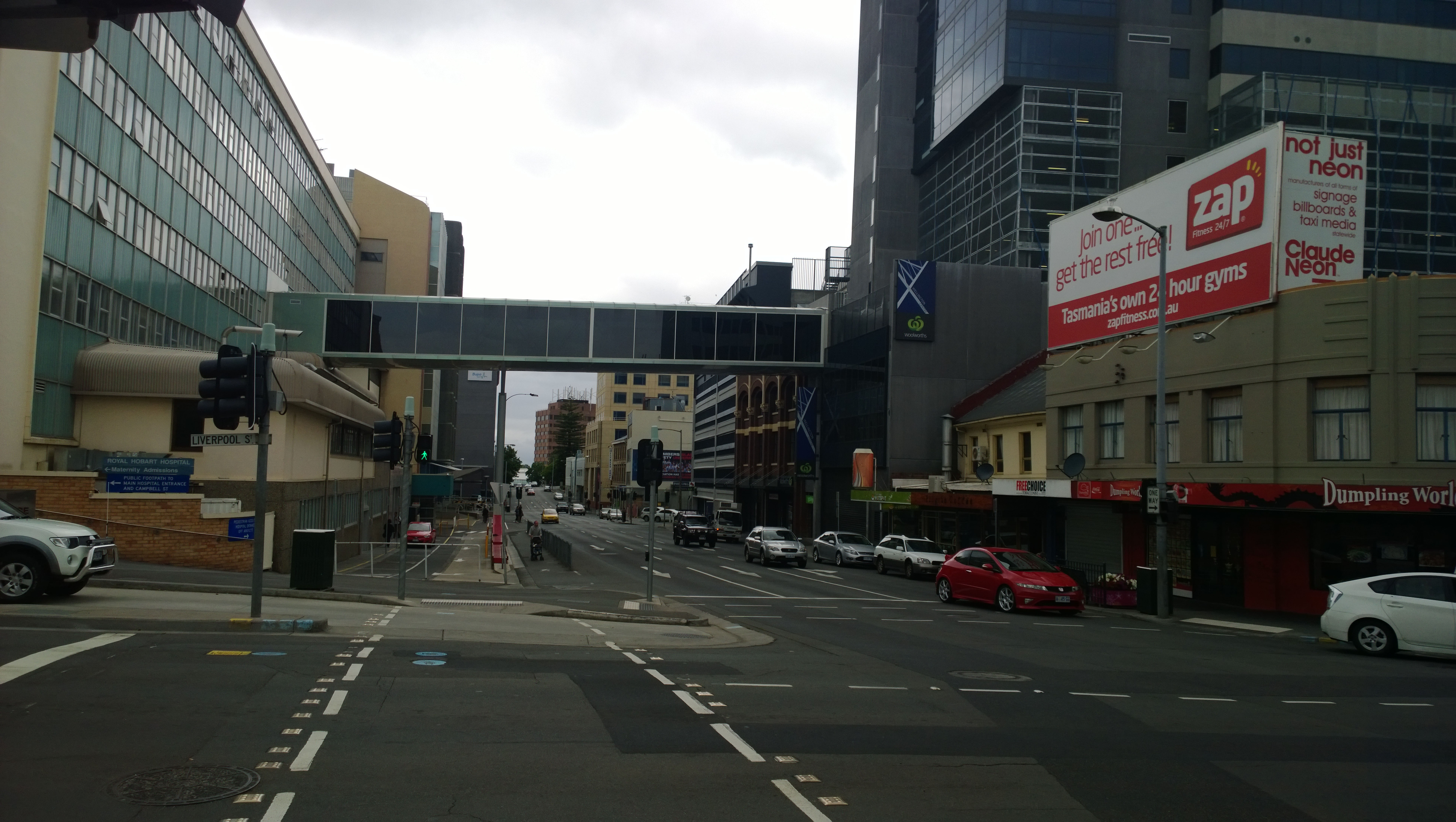
- Argyle Street intersecting with Liverpool Street

General information
- Type: Street
- Location: Hobart
- Length: 2.8 km (1.7 mi)

Major junctions
- South-East end: Morrison Street
- Macquarie Street; Davey Street
- North-West end: New Town Road

Argyle Street is a street in Hobart, Tasmania, Australia. The street was named by Lachlan Macquarie either in reference to Argyll, Scotland, where he grew up, or for the Duke of Argyll, head of Clan Campbell.

== Intersections ==
Commencing in the Hobart waterfront precinct at the northern end of Morrison Street, Argyle Street runs in a north-westerly direction through the Hobart CBD and North Hobart to its intersection with New Town Road in the suburb of New Town. It intersects with the following major streets (from south-east to north-west):

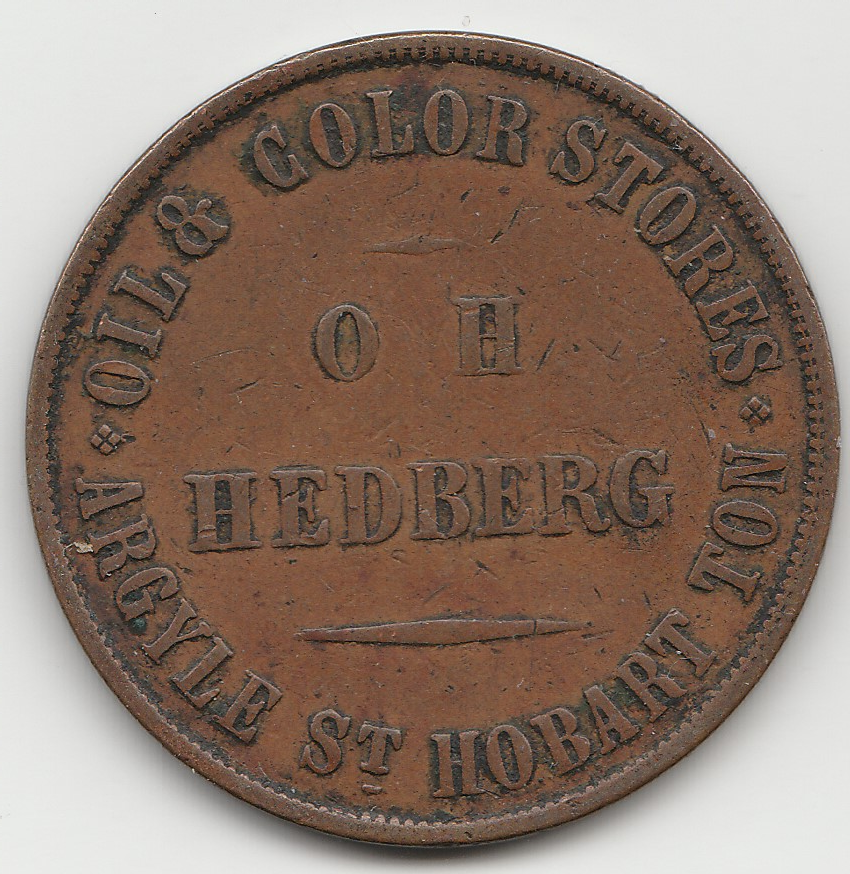
A penny token struck for O. H. Hedberg on Argyle St, c. 1850.

- Davey Street
- Macquarie Street
- Collins Street
- Liverpool Street
- Bathurst Street
- Melville Street
- Brisbane Street
- Warwick Street
- Burnett Street
- Federal Street
- Ryde Street
- Stoke Street
