= Brisbane Street =

Brisbane Street may refer to:

- Brisbane Street, Hobart, Australia
- Brisbane Street, Launceston, Australia
- Brisbane Street, Perth, Australia
