= Algona Road =

Road in Tasmania

Algona Road Tasmania
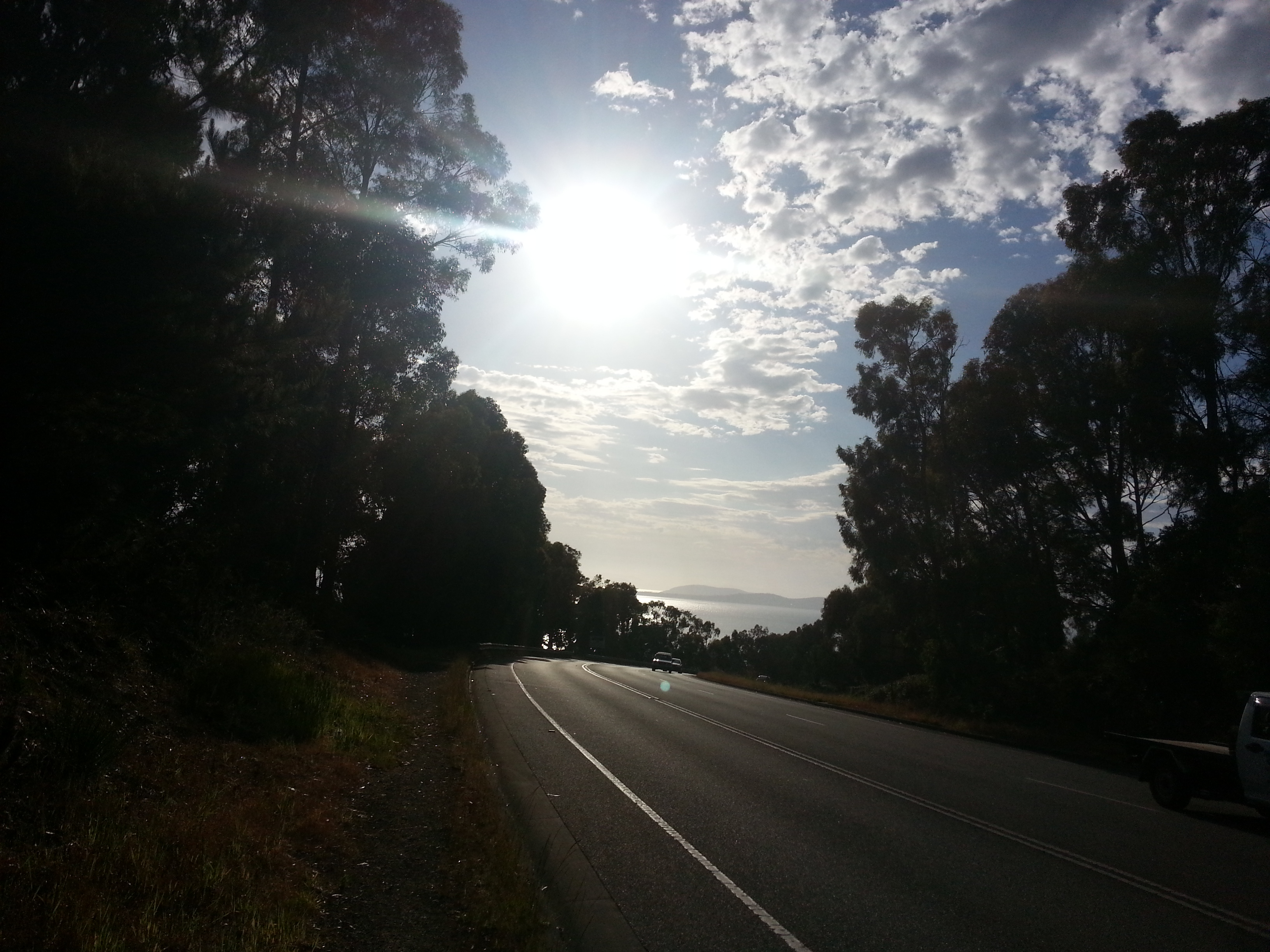
- Algona Road
- Coordinates: 42.997052°S 147.303228°E

General information
- Type: Road
- Length: 3.5 km (2.2 mi)
- Opened: 1986

Major junctions
- West end: Kingston, Tasmania
- Channel Highway
- East end: Blackmans Bay, Tasmania

Location(s)
- Region: Kingborough

Algona Road is a major link road, connecting the residents of Blackmans Bay to Kingston in Southern Tasmania, Australia. The road was constructed in 1986 as a two lane road, with provision for a second carriageway when needed. A roundabout was installed on the junction with the Channel Highway in 1993 to address safety issues. The Kingston Bypass connects Algona Road to the Southern Outlet and provides a quicker route to the City of Hobart.

== See also ==
- List of highways in Hobart
