= List of licensed and localized editions of Monopoly: Oceania =

The following is a list of game boards of the Parker Brothers/Hasbro board game Monopoly adhering to a particular theme or particular locale in Oceania. Lists for other regions can be found here. The game is licensed in 103 countries and printed in 37 languages.

== Australia ==
The Australian Edition features streets from each of the nation's capital cities. They are colour-arranged in order of population (Darwin streets as the brown group through to Sydney as green), with Canberra as the top blue group. The McGuinness-McDermott Foundation released three special editions to raise money for children's cancer research. The three editions were Adelaide (city) and the Adelaide and Port Adelaide football clubs. There has also been versions for Queensland, New South Wales, Victoria and Western Australia, with proceeds from each going to charities. McGuinness-McDermott Foundation also released a 2007 AFL Premiership edition which features the Geelong Football Club. Early 2008 saw the release of 2 more McGuinness-McDermott Foundation AFL editions, those being Carlton and Collingwood football clubs. McGuinness-McDermott Foundation are also responsible for releasing a V8 Supercars edition and in late 2008 will be releasing an Icons of South Australia charity edition.

Two other unofficial editions were released with relation to Kasoft Software. They were released as part of the Amstrad CPC prototype.

Australia Edition

Copyright date: 1990	Released by: Parker Brothers	Issued through: General release, exclusive to Australia

Free Parking	Stanley Street $220	Chance	Petrie Bight $220	Wickham Terrace $240	Flinders Street Station $200	Collins Street $260	Elizabeth Street $260	Telecom Australia $150	Bourke Street $280	Go To Jail
Rundle Mall $200	Australia Edition									Castlereagh Street $300
Victoria Square $180	Australia Edition									George Street $300
Community Chest	Australia Edition									Community Chest
North Terrace $180	Australia Edition									Pitt Street $320
Adelaide Station $200	Australia Edition									Sydney Station $200
Hay Street $160	Australia Edition									Chance
Barrack Street $140	Australia Edition									Flinders Way $350
Australia Post $150	Australia Edition									Luxury Tax (pay $100)
William Street $140	Australia Edition									Kings Avenue $400
In Jail/Just Visiting	Macquarie Street $120	Davey Street $100	Chance	Salamanca Place $100	Perth Station $200	Income Tax (pay $200)	Smith Street $60	Community Chest	Todd Street $60	Go (collect $200)

Game description: The first Australian Edition of Monopoly was released in 1990. The enclosed booklet describes the selection of the twenty-two colored properties and four railroads, from Stanley Street, Brisbane, Collins Street, Melbourne, Kings Avenue and Flinders Way in Canberra, Macquarie Street, Sydney, and Barrack Street and Hay Street in Perth. The four railroad stations included are Flinders Street, Sydney Station, Perth Station and Adelaide Station. Telstra and Australia Post take the places of Electric Company and Water Works, respectively. The currency denominations are 1, 5, 10, 20, 50, 100 and 500 Australian Dollars.
Tokens: Koala, thimble, dog, wheelbarrow, cannon, horse and rider, top hat, iron, battleship, race car and shoe.

Australian Football League Edition

Let's Go Caravanning and Camping Edition. Commissioned by the Caravan Industry Association of Australia in 2016

Australian Here and Now Edition

Copyright date: 2007	Released by: Parker Brothers	Issued through: General release, exclusive to Australia.

Game description: This edition represents certain locations from each state in Australia decided by an online poll in early 2007. The winning locations include Sovereign Hill, the Great Ocean Road, Lake Burley Griffin and the Great Barrier Reef. This edition includes more modern monetary amounts as well as updated Chance and Community Chest cards. The currency denominations are 10 000, 20 000, 50 000, 100 000, 200 000, 500 000, 1 000 000 and 5 000 000 Australian Dollars.
Tokens: Surfboard, thongs, ute, koala, labradoodle, mobile phone, laptop computer

Bunnings Warehouse Edition

Growth Equities Mutual Edition

Copyright date: 1990	Released by: Parker Brothers	Issued through: Not sold to the public, Growth Equities Mutual issued it to selected employees.

Game description: A version of Monopoly with the properties that were managed by Growth Equities Mutual Limited at the time of production (1990). The Chance and Community Chest have also been altered, however the player pieces are the same. As well as the properties managed by GEM the board features several Australian land marks including the Sydney Opera House and Kirribilli House. The four railroads are Sydney Central Station, Flinders Street Station, Brisbane Transit Centre and Perth Central Station respectively. The currency denominations are 1, 2, 5, 10, 20, 50 and 100 Australian Dollars.
Tokens: Cannon, horse and rider, top hat, iron, battleship, race car, wheel-barrow, dog, thimble and shoe.

Myer Monopoly Edition

Copyright date: 2010	Released by: Hasbro	Issued through: Limited Release. On sale at Myer stores.

Game description: This version replaces properties and train lines with Myer stores and distribution centres. The currency denominations are 1, 5, 10, 20, 50, 100 and 500 Australian Dollars.
Tokens: Top hat, iron, battleship, race car, wheel-barrow, dog, thimble and shoe.

Port Sorell Edition

Copyright date: 1991	Released by: Play-K, Kasoft Software	Issued through: Limited release in Port Sorell, Shearwater and Hawley Beach areas, software prototype release.

Free; Parking	Dumbleton Street $220	Chance	Kermode Street $220	Darling Street $240	Shearwater Shoppe $200	Seabreeze Avenue $260	Bluewater Crescent $260	Ampol Port Sorell $150	Shearwater Esplanade $280	Go To; The Police; Station
Archer Street $200	Port Sorell Edition									Pitcairn Street $300
Port Street $180	Port Sorell Edition									Parkes Ford Road $300
Community Chest	Port Sorell Edition									Community Chest
River Road $180	Port Sorell Edition									Alexander Street $320
Meridith Street Shop $200	Port Sorell Edition									Hawley Beach Store $200
The Dunes $160	Port Sorell Edition									Chance
Anderson Street $140	Port Sorell Edition									The Club Driveway $350
Mobil Shearwater $150	Port Sorell Edition									Sales Tax (pay $100)
Highwater Lane $140	Port Sorell Edition									Shearwater Boulevard $400
Police Station (Just Visiting)	Arthur Street $120	Seymour Street $100	Chance	Short Street $100	Wilmot Street Shop $200	Income Tax (pay $200 or 10%)	St Georges Crescent $60	Community Chest	Hugh Street $60	GO (collect $200)

Game description: The Port Sorell edition of Monopoly was released in 1991. Designed by Kade Hansson, three beach resort towns on the Rubicon River in Northern Tasmania are featured in the properties; these are Port Sorell, Shearwater and Hawley Beach. Chance and Community Chest remain unchanged, while "Jail" or "Gaol" is now referred to as the "Police Station". The four railroads included are popular shops in the areas, including Wilmot Street Shop, Meridith Street Shop, Shearwater Shoppe, and the Hawley Beach Store. The utilities become Mobil Shearwater and the now-defunct Ampol Port Sorell, service stations in the areas. The currency denominations are unchanged, and the chance and community chest cards - other than the new square names being used - are virtually identical to the originals (though you place second in a beach athletics competition for $10 and you attend a film screening at town hall to collect $50 from every player). This edition was released both as a board game and as a support to a prototype of Kasoft's Monopoly software project "Multipoly". Kasoft Base was located in the featured area for most of the 1980s.

Sandy Bay Edition

Copyright date: 1997	Released by: Play-K, Kasoft Software	Issued through: Software prototype release.

Free; Parking	Lord Street $220	Chance	King Street $220	Princes Street $240	McDonald's Sandy Bay $200	Marieville Esplanade $260	Drysdale Place $260	Regine's Night Club $150	Beach Road $280	Go To; Gaol
Queen Street $200	Sandy Bay Edition									Ascot Avenue $300
Duke Street $180	Sandy Bay Edition									Edith Avenue $300
Community Chest	Sandy Bay Edition									Community Chest
View Street $180	Sandy Bay Edition									Cheverton Parade $320
Mondo's Pizza House $200	Sandy Bay Edition									KFC Sandy Bay $200
Proctors Road $160	Sandy Bay Edition									Chance
Fitzroy Crescent $140	Sandy Bay Edition									Churchill Avenue $350
Club Surreal $150	Sandy Bay Edition									Sales Tax (pay $100)
French Street $140	Sandy Bay Edition									Sandy Bay Road $400
Gaol (Just Visiting)	Grosvenor Street $120	Parliament Street $100	Chance	Elboden Street $100	Mykonos Takeaway $200	Income Tax (pay $200 or 10%)	Greenlands Avenue $60	Community Chest	Lynton Avenue $60	GO (collect $200)

Game description: The Sandy Bay edition of Monopoly was released in 1998. Another Kade Hansson design, the properties originate from the southern suburbs of Hobart, Tasmania, generally around the southern campus of the University of Tasmania in Sandy Bay. Chance and Community Chest remain unchanged, while the "Gaol" (Jail) this time retains the name. The four railroads are Takeaway Shops (fast food establishments) in the area, which includes a McDonald's location in Sandy Bay. The utilities become nightclubs. The currency denominations are the usual, and the chance and community chest cards - other than the new square names being used - are virtually identical to the originals (collect $50 from every player is used for an opera grand opening, meanwhile). This edition didn't become a regular board game but instead joined Kasoft's Monopoly software project "Multipoly". Kasoft Base has been located in the Sandy Bay area since the 1990s.

V8 Supercars Monopoly Edition

Copyright date: 2007	Released by: Parker Brothers	Issued through: Limited Release. On sale at Supercheap Auto stores.

Game description: Released for charity, this version replaces train lines and properties with race tracks and drivers, including Mount Panorama and Peter Brock. The currency denominations are 1, 5, 10, 20, 50, 100 and 500 Australian Dollars.
Tokens: Cannon, horse and rider, top hat, iron, battleship, race car, wheel-barrow, dog, thimble and shoe.

In 2021, Australia Post, the post office, issued a customised edition.

== New Zealand ==
New Zealand Edition

Free Parking	High Street $220	Chance	Market Street $220	Trafalgar Street $240	Kaikōura Station $200	Cameron Road $260	Fenton Street $260	Water Works $150	Garden Place $280	Go To Jail
Victoria Avenue $200	New Zealand Edition									Dee Street $300
Rangitikei Street $180	New Zealand Edition									Princes Street $300
Community Chest	New Zealand Edition									Community Chest
Devon Street $180	New Zealand Edition									Cathedral Square $320
Taumarunui Station $200	New Zealand Edition									Frankton Junction $200
Bank Street $160	New Zealand Edition									Chance
Marine Parade $140	New Zealand Edition									Lambton Quay $350
Electric Company $150	New Zealand Edition									Super Tax (pay $100)
Gladstone Road $140	New Zealand Edition									Queen Street $400
In Jail/Just Visiting	Thames Street $120	Stafford Street $100	Chance	East Street $100	Balclutha Station $200	Income Tax(pay 10% or $200)	Mackay Street $60	Community Chest	Palmerston Street $60	Go (collect $200)

Game description: Street names taken from cities across the country. The most expensive streets are Queen Street, Auckland, Lambton Quay, Wellington, Cathedral Square, Christchurch, Princes Street, Dunedin and Dee Street, Invercargill. Each street name is taken from a different urban centre around the country.

New Zealand Here & Now Edition

Free Parking	Moeraki Boulders, Oamaru $2.2M	Chance	Golden Bay $2.2M	Ninety Mile Beach $2.4M	Dunedin Railway Station $2M	Art Deco Buildings, Napier $2.6M	Mt Maunganui $2.6M	Mobile Phone Company $1.5M	Waitomo Caves $2.8M	Go To Jail
Fox Glacier $2M	New Zealand Here & Now Edition									The Square, Palmerston North $3M
Milford Sound $1.8M	New Zealand Here & Now Edition									Cathedral Square $3M
Community Chest	New Zealand Here & Now Edition									Community Chest
Aoraki / Mount Cook $1.8M	New Zealand Here & Now Edition									Cable Cars, Wellington $3.2M
Port Tauranga $2M	New Zealand Here & Now Edition									Auckland International Airport $2M
Cape Reinga Lighthouse $1.6M	New Zealand Here & Now Edition									Chance
Lake Taupō $1.4M	New Zealand Here & Now Edition									Rangitoto $3.5M
Internet service provider $1.5M	New Zealand Here & Now Edition									GST (pay $1M)
Queenstown Ski Fields $1.4M	New Zealand Here & Now Edition									Pukekura Park Festival of Lights $4M
In Jail/Just Visiting	Te Papa $1.2M	Waitangi Treaty Grounds $1M	Chance	Larnach Castle $1M	Picton Ferry $2M	Income Tax (pay $2M)	Ohakune Carrot $600k	Community Chest	Te Puke Kiwifruit $600k	Go (collect $2M)

Tokens: Tokens include a pair of jandals, a jet aircraft, a notebook computer, a sheep, a sheepdog, a ute, and a jar of Vegemite

All Blacks Edition

Free Parking	Neemia Tialata $220	Scrum Card	Ma'a Nonu $220	Sitiveni Sivivatu $240	AMI Stadium $200	Andrew Hore $260	Joe Rokocoko $260	Iveco Series $150	Rodney So'oialo $280	Go To Jail
Piri Weepu $200	All Blacks Edition									Dan Carter $300
Brad Thorn $180	All Blacks Edition									Ali Williams $300
Lineout Card	All Blacks Edition									Lineout Card
Conrad Smith $180	All Blacks Edition									Keven Mealamu $320
Westpac Stadium $200	All Blacks Edition									Carisbrook $200
Jimmy Cowan $160	All Blacks Edition									Scrum Card
Isaia Toeava $140	All Blacks Edition									Mils Muliaina $350
Tri Nations Series $150	All Blacks Edition									KidsCan Donation (pay $100)
Jerome Kaino $140	All Blacks Edition									Richie McCaw $400
In Jail/Just Visiting	John Afoa $120	Anthony Boric $100	Scrum Card	Richard Kahui $100	Eden Park $200	KidsCan Donation ($200)	Stephen Donald $60	Lineout Card	Kieran Read $60	Go (collect $200)

Game description: Street names taken from players. Only 4000 have been produced. Proceeds from the sale of the All Blacks Monopoly Charity Edition game will go to the official charity of the All Blacks, the KidsCan Charitable Trust, for the basic physical needs of financially disadvantaged children.

Wellington Edition (launched 2017)

Southland Edition (launched 2022)

Christchurch Edition (launched 2023)

Queenstown Edition (launched 2024)

Dunedin Edition (launched 2024)

Wānaka Edition (launched 2024)
