= Kingston Interchange =

Roundabout interchange in Tasmania, Australia

Coordinates: 42°58′13.91″S 147°18′34.78″E

The Kingston Interchange is a hybrid four way interchange incorporating a roundabout and elements of a trumpet interchange. It connects the Southern Outlet with the Huon Highway and the Channel Highway at Kingston, within the greater area of Hobart, Tasmania, Australia.

In 2006, the Kingston Interchange was upgraded to address safety problems associated with right-turn movements at the interchange. The interchange modifications included:

- Replacement of the existing T junction of the Southern Outlet south bound off ramp and the Huon Highway with a roundabout
- Provide a new on ramp for Kingston to Hobart traffic
- Provide a new on ramp for Kingston to Margate traffic

The Department of Infrastructure, Energy & Resources also upgraded the interchange with the intention of providing a dual carriage highway south of the interchange some time in the future as part of the Kingston Bypass.
