= Kingston Bypass =

Highway in Tasmania, Australia

Kingston Bypass Tasmania
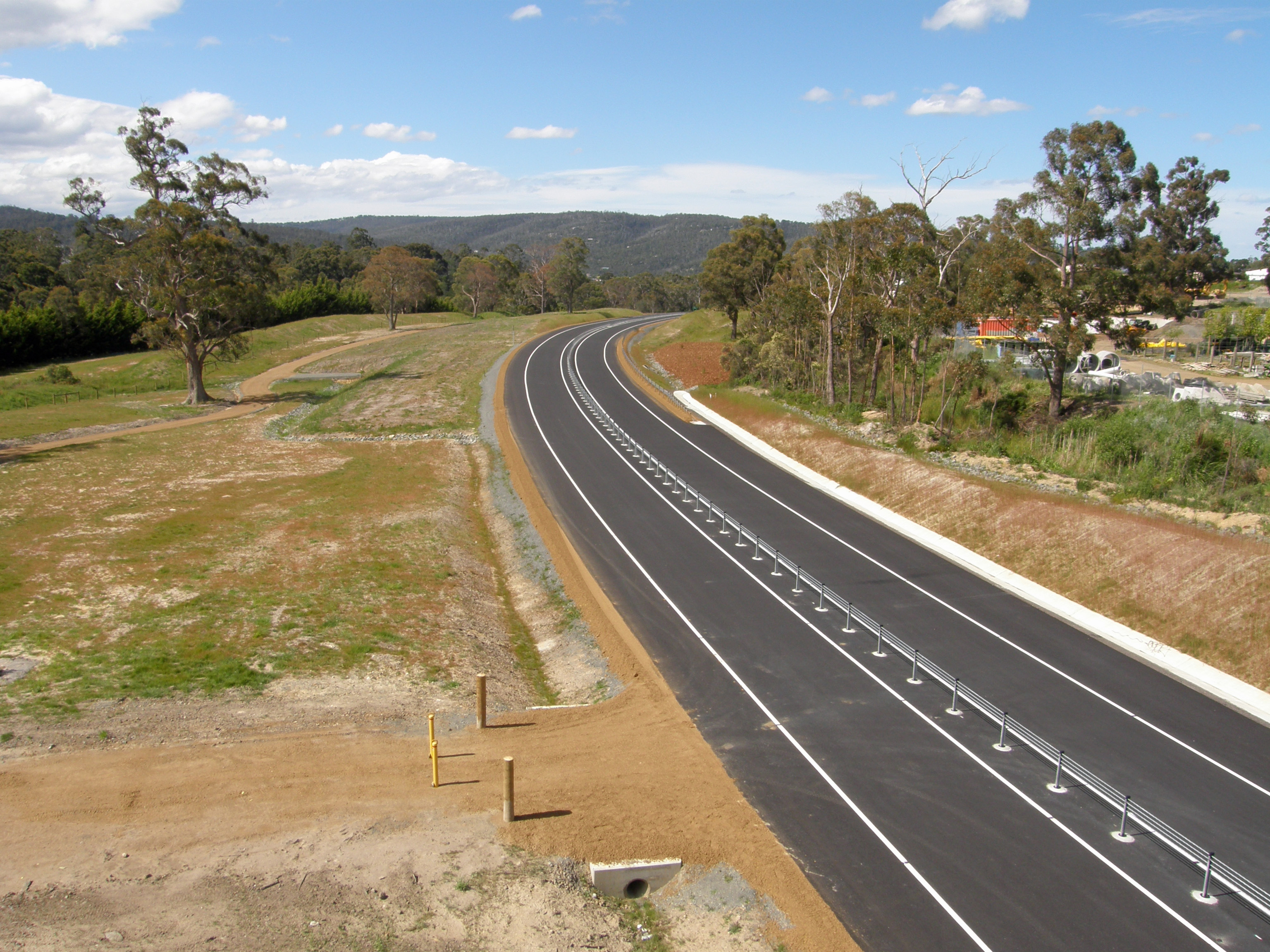
- The Kingston Bypass, prior to being opened to traffic

General information
- Type: Highway
- Length: 2.8 km (1.7 mi)
- Opened: 2011
- Route number(s): B68

Major junctions
- North end: Southern Outlet (A6); Huon Highway (A6); (Kingston Interchange)
- Summerleas Road
- South end: Channel Highway (B68); Algona Road

Location(s)
- Region: Hobart
- Major suburbs: Kingston

Highway system
- Highways in Australia; National Highway • Freeways in Australia; Highways in Tasmania

The Kingston Bypass is a A$41 million, 2.8-kilometre-long (1.7 mi) highway bypassing the southern Hobart community of Kingston, Tasmania. The proposal of a bypass was originally published in the Hobart Area Transportation Study during 1965. The bypass was completed in 2011, after the need to such a road was realised several years earlier when the Channel Highway reached an 18,000 AADT. Construction of the Bypass was made possible by an A$15 million pledge for the project, made by the Australian Labor Party during the 2007 federal election campaign. During construction total cost of the bypass blew out from the original estimate of $30 million to over $41 million.

== Route description ==
The Kingston Bypass begins at the Kingston Interchange, which connects the Southern Outlet with the Huon Highway. The bypass heads south-west, crossing Whitewater Creek after 300 metres (0.19 mi). The ramps for the Summerleas Road four-ramp parclo interchange are spread out over the next 800 metres (0.50 mi). The interchange also provides access to the bypassed section of Channel Highway, which runs through development to the east. The Kingston Bypass continues south-west for another one kilometre (0.62 mi), before passing under Spring Farm Road and curving around to meet Channel Highway and Algona Road at a large roundabout, 500 metres (0.31 mi) further south.

The bypass is a dual carriageway around the Summerleas Road interchange, and a single carriageway elsewhere. It is the northern section of the B68 road route, which continues south along Channel Highway, and has a posted speed limit of 80 km/h (50 mph).

== History ==
The bypass was originally proposed in the Hobart's Transportation study of 1965. This study recommended the development of the Southern Outlet as the primary access route to Kingston and Huonville. The study also recommended that as part of the Southern Outlet, a bypass of Kingston be provided and that the future road connection should be provided between the Channel Highway south of Kingston and Blackmans Bay.

The Southern Outlet opened to traffic in 1968. In the absence of a Kingston Bypass, the Southern Outlet's southern Terminus was the Kingston Interchange. In 1983, a bypass corridor for the future Channel Highway was proclaimed west of the existing Alignment. In 1986 Algona Road was opened as a 2 lane road. Algona Road was constructed for a task such as connecting Kingston Bypass to Blackmans Bay and has available space dedicated for a second carriageway. The proclaimed bypass corridor runs from the Algona Road/Channel Highway Junction to the Kingston Interchange. Additionally in 1986, a bypass of the Kingston CBD was provided by construction of a link road between the Kingston Interchange and Summerleas Road.

=== Design ===
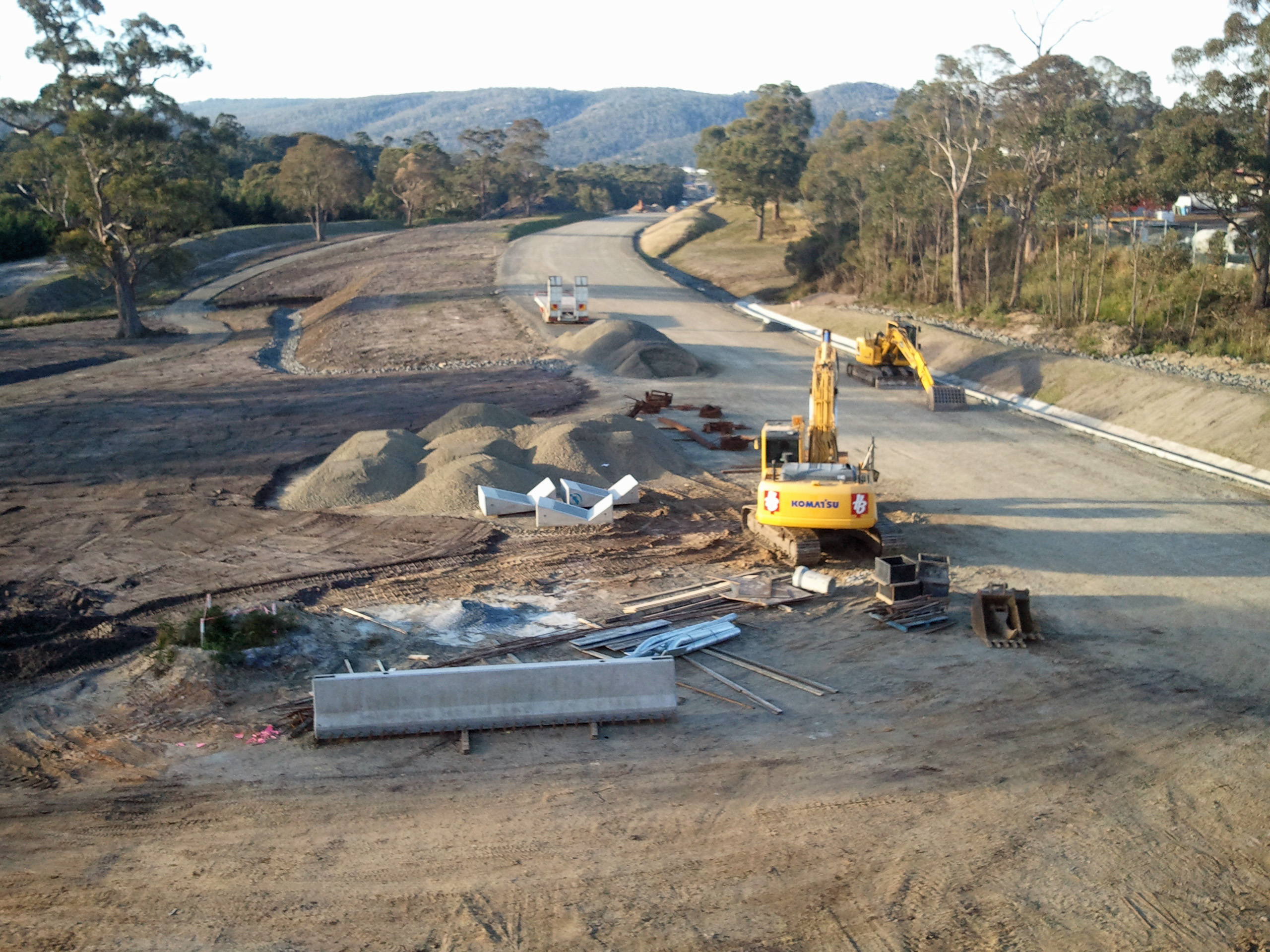
Kingston Bypass construction site

The location of corridor proclamation was influenced by the Hobart Area Transportation Study. The transport corridor for the bypass is situated to the west of the Channel Highway's old alignment. Acquisition of the land required for the Bypass was commenced in 1983. Due to the realisation that extra land was required to facilitate a grade separated interchange at Summerleas Road. The northern terminus of the bypass is south of the Kingston Interchange and located on the western side of the existing Channel Highway. The southern terminus of the bypass shares a new roundabout with Algona Road. The roundabout is the largest in Tasmania. The roundabout has been designed to allow for the construction of a grade separated interchange when so needed. This essentially means that a sixth leg to the roundabout will be built with two of the current approaches becoming one-way. To allow for the future duplication of the Highway and provide an alignment consistent with the connecting Southern Outlet, the geometric alignment of the Bypass has been designed for a 100 km/h (62 mph) speed limit. The posted speed limit on the bypass is currently 80 km/h (50 mph).

=== Construction ===
Work Commenced on the Kingston Bypass in February, 2010. In March, 2010, several elected members of local government expressed concern the Project was stalling, after the apparent lack of construction work taking place the preceding month. in July, 2010, five thousand Aboriginal artefacts were found on the proposed route of the Kingston bypass, in the area immediately south of Algona Road This discovery included scarred stones, which were used to make tools, and stone blades and flakes. A stone quarry was also found. The Department of Infrastructure, Energy and Resources and the Tasmanian Aboriginal came to an agreement that the Highway's alignment in that area would be shifted slightly to allow for preservation of the site. The southbound lane of the bypass was opened for 5 days starting 21 November 2011, as a temporary diversion to enable work to be completed on the on and off-ramps of the south-bound lanes of the bypass. The project is currently ahead of schedule and is expected to be completed by late 2011.

== Intersections ==
The entire highway is in the Kingborough Council local government area.

Location	km	mi	Destinations	Notes
Kingston	0	0.0	Southern Outlet (A6) / Huon Highway (A6) – Hobart, Huonville, Kingston	Northern highway terminus at Kingston Interchange, continues north as Southern Outlet; no access to Huon Highway from Kingston Bypass northbound
Kingston	0.3– 1.1	0.19– 0.68	Summerleas Road to Channel Highway – Huonville, Kingston	Interchange
Kingston	2.6	1.6	Channel Highway (B68 south) / Algona Road east – Kingston, Blackmans Bay, Margate, Snug, Kettering	Southern highway terminus at roundabout
1.000 mi = 1.609 km; 1.000 km = 0.621 mi: Incomplete access

== See also ==
- Transport in Hobart
- Hobart Area Transportation Study
- List of bypasses in Tasmania
- Southern Outlet
- Channel Highway
- Algona Road
