= St David's Park =

Historic park in Hobart, Tasmania, Australia

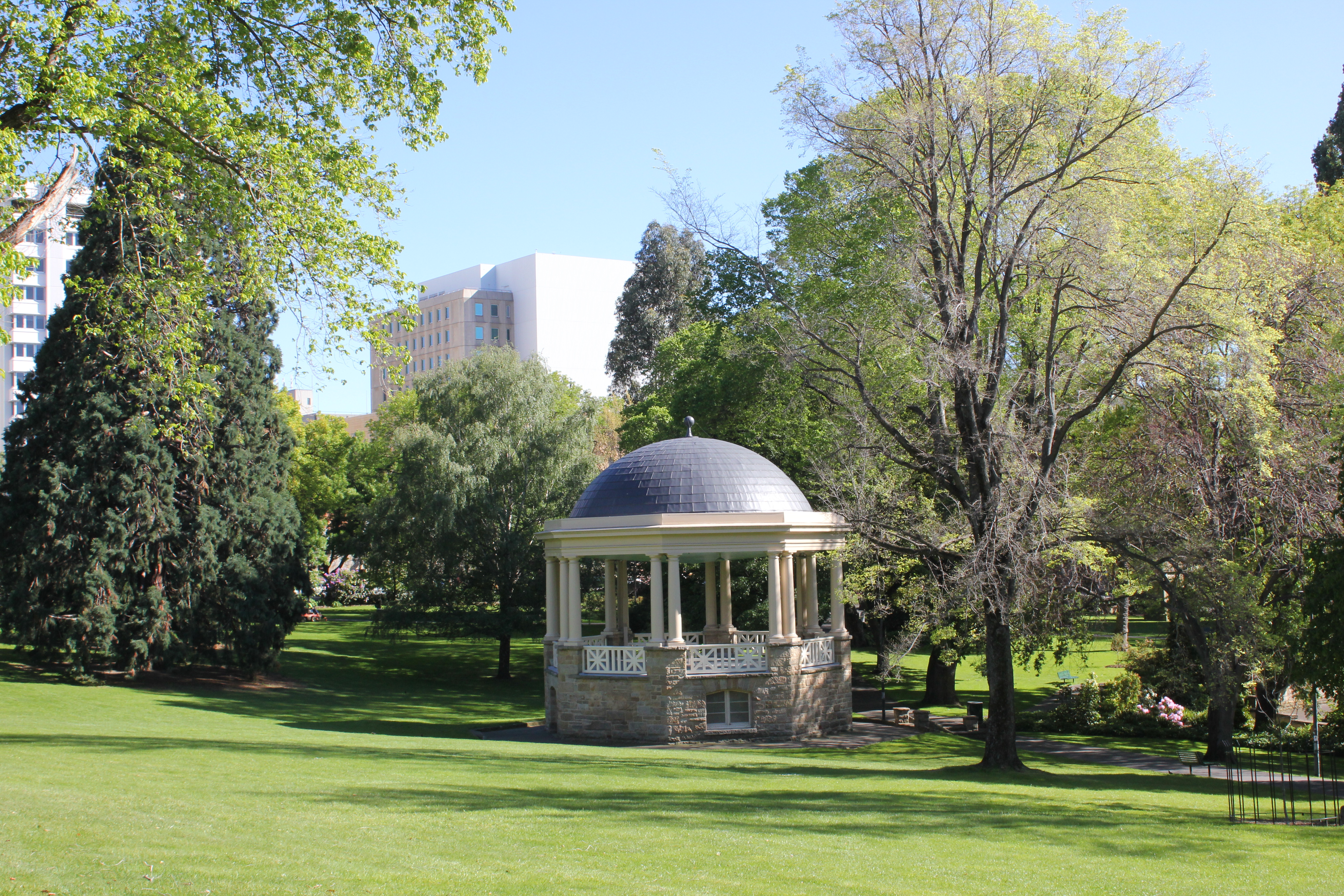
- The rotunda in St David's Park
- Interactive map of St David's Park
- Type: Public park
- Location: Hobart, Tasmania, Australia
- Coordinates: 42.886°S 147.329°E
- Area: 2.3 hectares (5.7 acres)
- Created: Early 20th century
- Opened: Officially as a park in early 20th century
- Founder: Hobart City Council
- Operator: City of Hobart
- Open: 24 hours
- Status: Open all year
- Paths: Paved, accessible paths
- Designation: Heritage-listed
- Parking: Nearby street parking available
- Public transit: Bus services along Davey Street
- Facilities: Rotunda, memorial walls, benches, historical plaques
- Website: Hobart City Council

St David's Park is a heritage-listed park in Hobart, Tasmania, bounded by Davey Street, Salamanca Place, and Sandy Bay Road. The site originally served as Hobart’s primary burial ground and is the final resting place of several early settlers, including its founding Lieutenant Governor, David Collins. Today, St David's Park functions as a public park featuring an English landscape garden, memorial walls, and historical monuments.

== History ==
St David's Park occupies the site of Hobart's original burial ground, which dates to the early 1800s when the island was known to Europeans as Van Diemen's Land. The cemetery was the resting place for many of its early settlers and convicts, including founding Lieutenant Governor David Collins, who played a key role in the British colonisation of Lutruwita. Other notable burials include mid-19th-century Lieutenant Governor Sir John Eardley-Wilmot, 1st Baronet; mariner and explorer James Kelly; and public secretary James Bicheno, who inspired the name for the east coast town of Bicheno.

=== Development and early use ===
The cemetery was formally designated in 1804 by Rev. Robert Knopwood, with burials commencing shortly after Hobart Town’s establishment. The site appeared on early maps, including one by surveyor James Meehan in 1811. Over time, the cemetery fell into neglect, attracting criticism from locals. The Colonial Magazine in 1840 described it as "neglected, naked, and unkind," noting its unkempt appearance and overgrown graves.

=== Decline and transformation ===
By the late 19th century, the cemetery was in significant disrepair. It closed to new burials in 1872, and as conditions deteriorated, public support grew to convert the area into a public space. In 1920, the St. David's Burial Ground Vesting and Improvement Act transferred the site to the Hobart City Council, permitting the reinterment of remains at Cornelian Bay Cemetery upon relatives' requests. Many headstones were preserved along the park’s boundary walls, and significant monuments, including Collins' memorial, were consolidated in the park's northeast corner.

=== Establishment as a park ===
The site’s redesign was overseen by L. Lipscombe, Superintendent of Reserves, who transformed it into a Victorian-style public park with landscaped lawns, tree-lined paths, and a rotunda. St David’s Park officially opened to the public in 1926. It is adjacent to the Supreme Court of Tasmania and Salamanca Place, the latter known for its iconic weekend market. Today, St David's Park functions as a historical site and recreational area, preserving Hobart’s early history while offering green space within the city.

== Features ==
- Memorial Walls: The park includes memorial walls constructed from gravestones and plaques from the original cemetery. These walls commemorate early settlers and convicts and are among the park’s notable historical features.
- The Rotunda: Centrally located, the rotunda is frequently used for community events and performances.
- Lion Gate Posts: The park’s entrance features two lion statues sculpted by Richard Patterson around 1884. Initially located at the Bank of Van Diemen's Land building, the statues were relocated to the park in 1988 after being stored at Port Arthur when the original building was demolished.

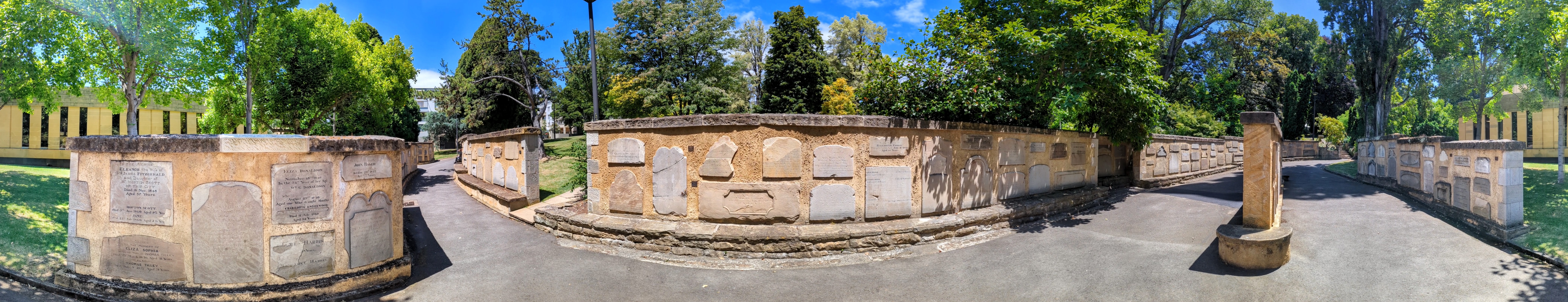
The Memorial Walls at St David's Park

== Landscape and design ==
St David’s Park is designed in the Victorian garden style, featuring lawns, flower beds, and a mix of native and exotic trees. It is enclosed by a historic stone wall and wrought iron gates. The park connects with the adjacent Supreme Court of Tasmania and provides access to Salamanca Place.

== Poem by Vivian Smith ==
St David's Park inspired the poem St. David’s Park, Hobart, by Tasmanian poet Vivian Smith, reflects the park's historical and natural elements. The poem highlights the interaction between the park’s natural beauty and historical context:

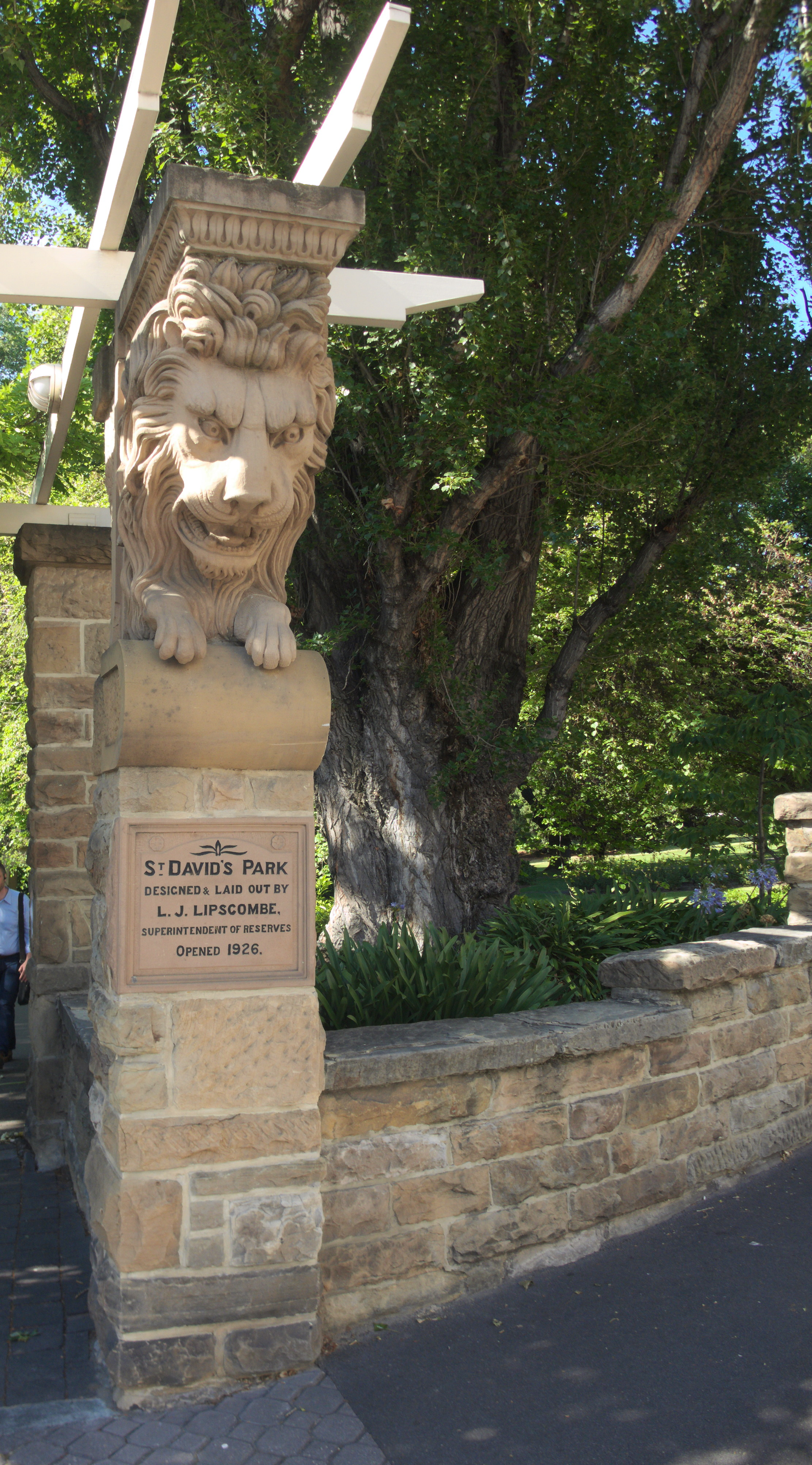
One of the lion gate sculptures at the park’s entrance.

It has a gum-tree
And six plovers
And the lawned loam
Entombs sisters and brothers.

Pallid death-stones, black with dust,
Seedless grass and sapless trees —
What a background for midnight lust,
Or pollen-gathering bees.

The winds of Time have worn stones bare,
Have sanded moss-lipped paths;
But this is the willowed place where
Goldfinches take their baths.

This is the place where Collins rots,
And there’s a stone to a Russian tailor:
Where a public collection provided the tomb
For nine from a derelict whaler...

Mid-Victorians, puritan-cold,
Are now but one with the damp leaf-mould...

It has a gum-tree
And six plovers
And the weeping willow
Shades many lovers.
