= Brisbane Street, Hobart =

Street in Hobart, Tasmania

Brisbane Street Tasmania

General information
- Type: Street
- Length: 1.3 km (0.8 mi)

Major junctions
- North-East end: Brooker Highway
- South-West end: Hill Street, Hobart

Location(s)
- Suburb(s): Hobart City Centre, West Hobart

Brisbane Street is a street in Hobart, Tasmania. The street was named for Sir Thomas Makdougall Brisbane, the sixth Governor of New South Wales.

== Route description ==
The street commences at an intersection with the Brooker Highway in Hobart. It runs in a south-westerly direction, first crossing Campbell Street. A former convict penitentiary and chapel, now known as the Campbell Street Gaol, is on the south-west corner of this intersection. Now open to the public, its official address is 6 Brisbane Street.

It next crosses Argyle Street and then Elizabeth Street. Between these two streets, on the northern side, are two nineteenth century former Congregational churches. The next major cross streets are Murray Street and Harrington Street. St Mary's Cathedral precinct is on the north-west corner of the Harrington Street intersection.

The street next crosses Barrack Street and ends at Hill Street. This section was the last developed due to its hilly nature. The southern side of this section is part of a heritage precinct featuring typical forms of early housing.

== St Mary's Cathedral precinct ==
St Mary's Cathedral precinct is located at the corner of Brisbane and Harrington Streets. It includes St Peter's Hall.

== Congregational church buildings ==
As an early named street in Hobart, it was the location of a number of significant activities and buildings in the colonial era. The Brisbane Street Chapel, the Brisbane Street Congregational Hall, The Memorial Hall was regularly used for a range of activities An older structure of the Congregational church was demolished in 1889 to make way for a newer building.

In 2018, a book of the churches in colonial Hobart identified the congregational buildings as surviving through to contemporary times.

Independent Congregational Chapel, 71 Brisbane Street
Memorial Congregational Church, 73 Brisbane Street

The Hobart Women's Christian Temperance Union was located in the 1930s at 112 Brisbane Street. It also utilised adjacent facilities.

=== Reverend Frederick Miller memorial ===
A memorial plaque, commemorating Reverend Frederick Miller, the first independent minister in the Australian colonies, and the founder of the Congregational church in Hobart, is located at 73 Brisbane Street.

== Hotel and accommodation ==
The former Ye Old Commodore hotel established in the 1800s, later known as the Brisbane Hotel changed hands in the 1920s.

The Sydney Lodge Guest House operated in the 1930s. Other businesses on the street in the 1920s and 1930s included Absalom's Motor Garage, and Tasmanian Corrugated Paper.

== F H Vallance & Sons, Cabinet Maker ==
At 17 Brisbane Street was the cabinet making business of F H Vallance & Sons. The newest building is on the street and was built as a show room for pieces that had been made. Behind that was the polishing shop, the cabinet making workshop, the machine shop and at the north end the upholstery shop. There were timber stacks and facilities for the people who worked here. Many fine early pieces are in the Tasmanian Museum - both restorations and originals. There are other pieces in the Parliament and many privately held pieces were made on commission. The factory was built over period of years starting in 1938.

Next to the factory at 19 Brisbane Street was the family residence which was originally built as the Brisbane Hotel. On the east wall is the original sign for F H Vallance & Sons.

== Land Commissioners report ==
When the Land Commissioners reported to Lieutenant-Governor Arthur on the use of land in the colony of Van Diemens Land in 1826 they included a map which showed that Brisbane Street had been surveyed only as far west as Barrack Street. They assumed this was because colonists were reluctant to build on the hilly ground further west. With some foresight they predicted a future demand for this land and set a higher valuation for it.

== See also ==
- Brisbane Street, Launceston
- List of highways in Hobart
