= Channel Highway =

Highway in Tasmania, Australia

Channel Highway Tasmania
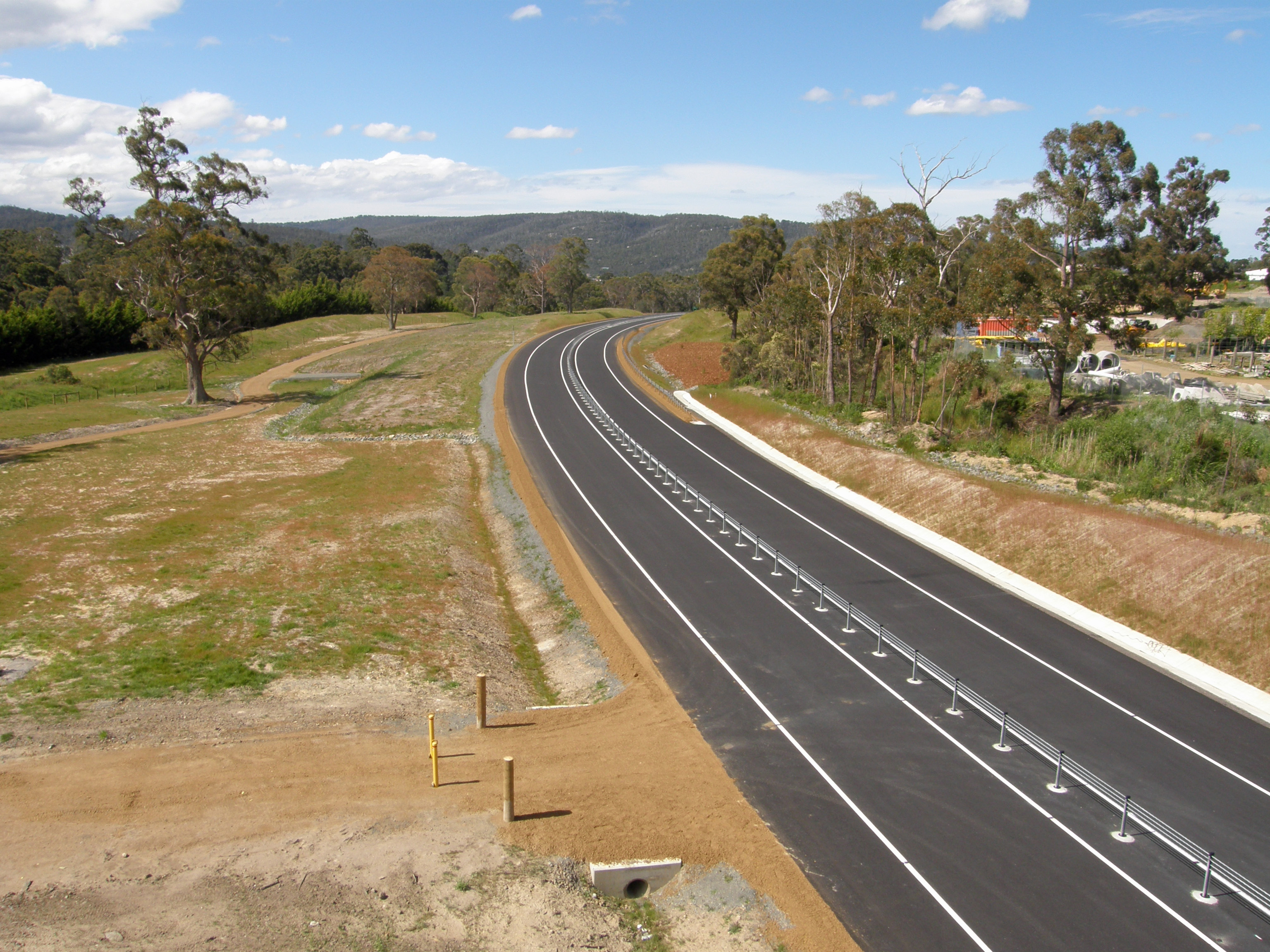
- Channel Highway on the Kingston Bypass

General information
- Type: Highway
- Length: 88 km (55 mi)
- Route number(s): B68; Taroona — Huonville
- Former route number: State Route 6

Major junctions
- North end: Sandy Bay Road; Taroona, Hobart, Tasmania
- Huon Highway; Southern Outlet
- South end: Huon Highway; Huonville, Tasmania

Location(s)
- Major settlements: Taroona, Kingston, Huntingfield, Margate, Kettering, Woodbridge, Cygnet

Highway system
- Highways in Australia; National Highway • Freeways in Australia; Highways in Tasmania

The Channel Highway is a regional highway that travels south from Hobart To Huonville, Tasmania, Australia. The Channel Highway starts from the end of Sandy Bay Road and travels south toward Huonville via Taroona, Kingston, Huntingfield, Margate, Kettering, Woodbridge and Cygnet. The shortest way from Hobart to Huonville is via the Huon Highway. Prior to the construction of the Southern Outlet the Channel Highway was the main route used to get to Kingston and other southern towns.

== Kingston Bypass ==
In February 2010, the Tasmanian Government approved the construction of the 2.8 km Kingston Bypass. The bypass includes the Summerleas Road underpass, Algona Road roundabout and dedicated cycle lanes.

== See also ==
- List of highways in Hobart
