= Macquarie Street, Hobart =

Street in Hobart, Tasmania, Australia

Coordinates: 42°53′16″S 147°19′25″E

Macquarie Street Tasmania
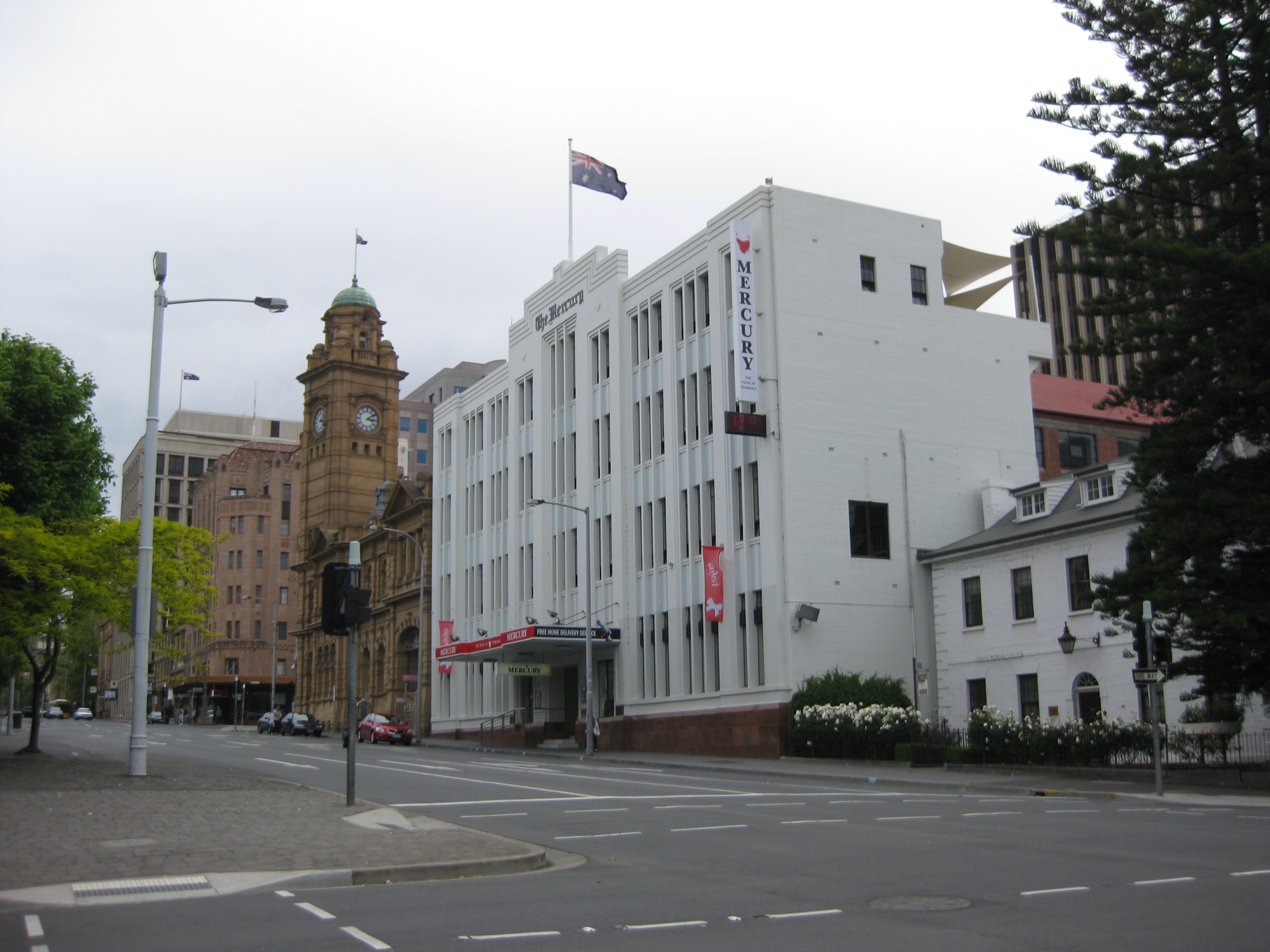
- The old Mercury building at 93 Macquarie Street

General information
- Type: Street
- Length: 2 km (1.2 mi)
- Route number(s): A6

Major junctions
- West end: Cascade Road; Washington Street/ Darcy Street/ South Hobart, Tasmania
- Southern Outlet
- East end: Brooker Highway / Tasman Highway; Davey Street, Hobart, Tasmania

Location(s)
- Region: Hobart

Macquarie Street a major one way street passing through the outskirts of the Hobart central business district in Tasmania, Australia. Macquarie street is named after Lachlan Macquarie, who oversaw the planning of Hobart’s inner city grid layout. The street forms a one-way couplet with nearby Davey Street connecting traffic from the Southern Outlet in the south with traffic from the Tasman Highway to the east and the Brooker Highway to the north of the city. With annual average daily traffic of 28,500, the road is one of the busier streets in Hobart.

From the South Hobart intersection with Cascade Road, Washington Street and Darcy Street, Macquarie Street runs approximately 2 km (1.2 mi) east from South Hobart as a two-way street until it reaches the intersection with the southern outlet where it becomes a one-way street for the duration of its length. It is primarily four lanes with the exception of its two-way section which is one lane both ways. The intersections on the one-way portion of the street are regulated by synchronised traffic lights.

Macquarie Street borders the city garden Franklin Square. Prominent buildings in the street include the Hotel Grand Chancellor, the Lands Building (which houses the Department of Natural Resources and Environment Tasmania), the Mercury building, St Davids Cathedral and the Reserve Bank Building. St. Joseph's Catholic Church, which was opened on Christmas Day in 1841, is located at the junction of Macquarie Street and Harrington Street.

Macquarie Street is featured as a property in the Australian version of Monopoly.

== Traffic usage ==
On 15 August 1977 it was converted to a one way street with a contraflow lane for bus services introduced between Elizabeth and Murray streets. The current one-way couplet system using Macquarie Street and Davey Street was first proposed with the publication of the Hobart Area Transportation Study in 1965. At the time the couplet system was intended to be a stop gap measure before the then proposed Northside Freeway could be completed. However the proposed freeway was seen as controversial and abandoned. Since the completion of the couplet in 1987, there has been no alternative route between the Southern outlet and the other major arterial roads in Hobart. There has since been several design proposals for a tunnel under the city ranging from cut and cover proposals under Davey/Macquarie Streets to large scale bored tunnels running from the Southern Outlet through to the Tasman Bridge.
