= Davey Street =

Street in Hobart, Tasmania, Australia

Coordinates: 42°52′51″S 147°20′03″E

Davey Street Tasmania
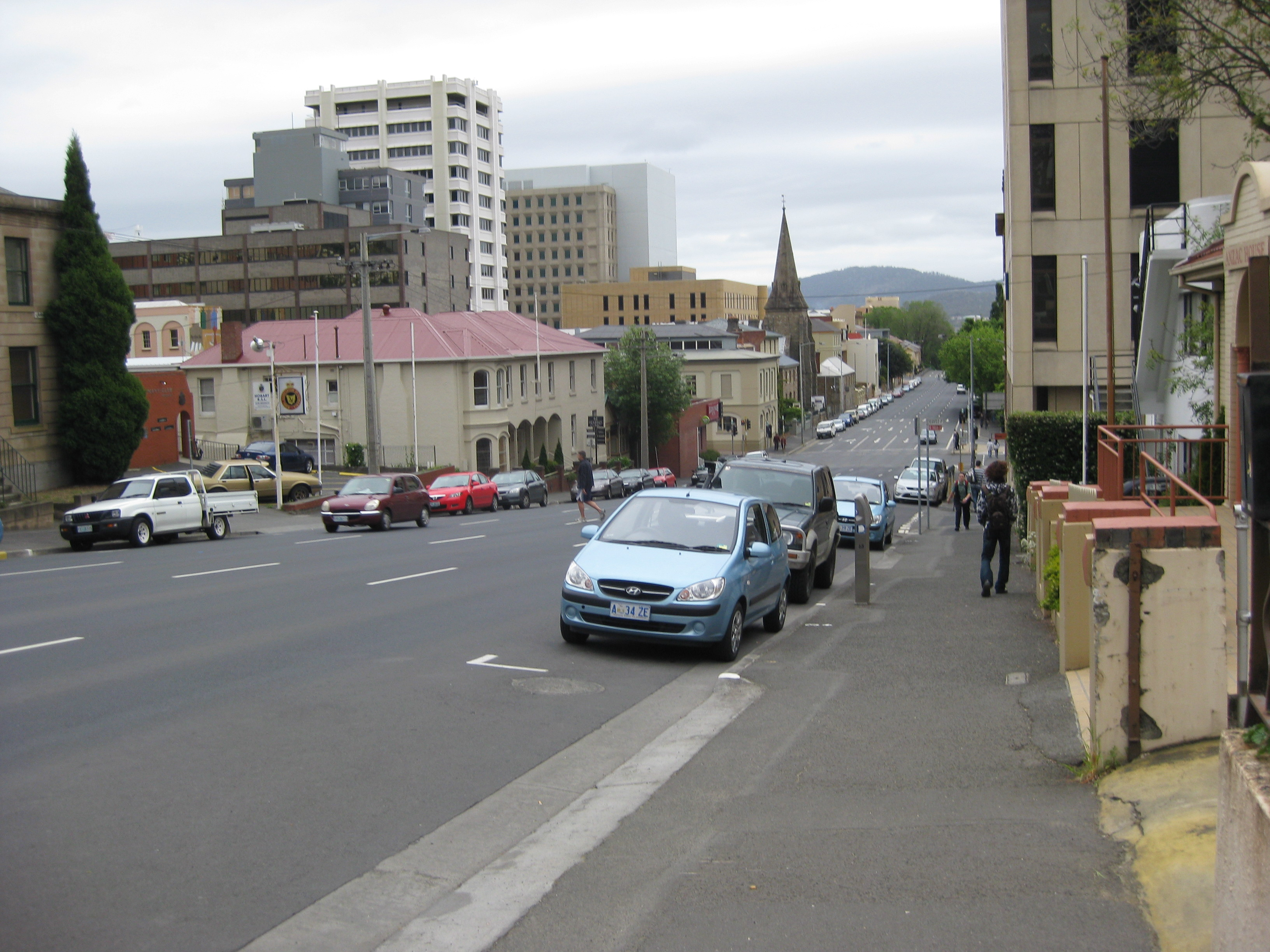
- Part of Davey Street, looking north-east from near Anglesea Barracks

General information
- Type: Street
- Length: 2 km (1.2 mi)
- Route number(s): A6 (Tasman Highway – Southern Outlet); B64 (Southern Outlet – Huon Road)

Major junctions
- East end: Brooker Highway / Tasman Highway / Macquarie Street, Hobart
- Sandy Bay Road / Southern Outlet
- West end: Huon Road / Darcy Street / Lynton Avenue, South Hobart

Location(s)
- Region: Hobart

Davey Street is a major one way street passing through the outskirts of the Hobart central business district in Tasmania, Australia. Davey street is named after Thomas Davey, the first Governor of Van Diemen's Land. The street forms a one-way couplet with nearby Macquarie Street connecting traffic from the Southern Outlet in the south with traffic from the Tasman Highway to the east and the Brooker Highway to the north of the city. With annual average daily traffic of 37,200 in 2007, it is one of the busier streets in Hobart.

Davey Street is featured as a property in the Australian version of Monopoly.

== History ==
Historically the Sullivans Cove area of Davey Street was a significantly quieter stretch of road, greatly utilised by shipping activities as part of the former Wapping district. Throughout the 1800s, Several smaller factory buildings facing Davey Street were operated by the Van Diemen's Land Company and merchants AG Webster & Son.

The Hobart Electric Tram Company utilised land with Campbell Street and Davey Street frontage for their tram depot workshop, commencing 1893. The depot then housed the city's trolleybuses from 1935 and from 1955 operated as the original headquarters for Metro Tasmania. The main section of the tram terminus was located directly opposite on Macquarie Street and its original offices, store and entrance arches all remain, with the latter being incorporated into newly built structures.

In 1938, a General Motors dealership called Nettlefolds was constructed along Hunter Street, intersecting with Davey Street. The dealership contained a large Art Deco commercial building containing a corner tower and neon signage. The site housed a General Motors showroom, bodyworks and service centre specialising in Vauxhall and Bedford trucks.

On 15 August 1977 it was converted to a one way street. Prior to the construction of the Hotel Grand Chancellor in the 1980s, Davey Street commenced at Hunter Street. Part of the Sheraton masterplan saw Davey Street extended and connected with the newly created Brooker Highway (formally Lower Park Street). This route alteration completely changed the way transit operated in the city, with Davey Street now functioning as one of the city's central transit thoroughfares.

== Route ==
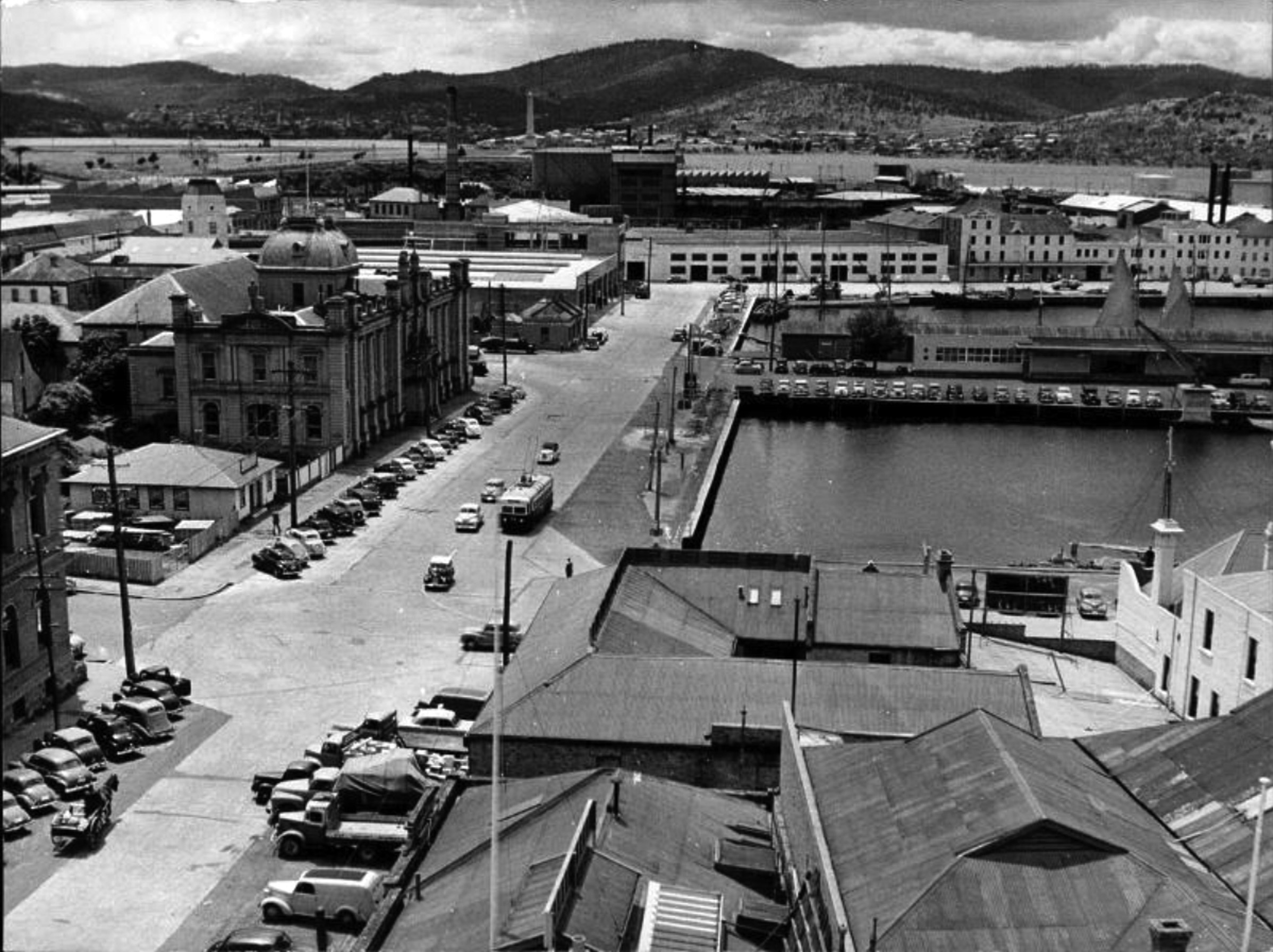
Prior to the development of the Hotel Grand Chancellor, Davey Street commenced at Hunter Street

Davey street commences close to the historic Royal Engineers Building at an intersection with the Tasman Highway, the Brooker Highway and Macquarie Street. It is four-lane for almost all of its length, providing access to Salamanca, Sandy Bay and the Southern Outlet to Kingston and Huonville.

Sections of Davey Street's alignment are on reclaimed land on the edge of Constitution Dock and Victoria Dock at Sullivan's Cove. It borders two of the city's largest urban parks; Franklin Square and St David's Park.

Prominent buildings in the street include the Tasmanian Museum & Art Gallery, Hydro-Electric Commission Building, the Executive Building (which houses the Department of Premier & Cabinet), the Hotel Grand Chancellor, Federation Concert Hall, the Hobart Real Tennis Club, and the former Davey Street Telstra exchange (now apartments).

== Proposed bypass ==
The current one-way couplet system between Macquarie Street and Davey Street was first proposed with the publication of the Hobart Area Transportation Study in 1965. At the time the couplet system was intended to be a stop gap measure before the then proposed Northside Freeway could be completed. However the proposed freeway was seen as controversial and abandoned. Since the completion of the couplet in 1987, there has been no alternative route between the Southern outlet and the other major arterial roads in Hobart. There has since been several design proposals for a tunnel under the city ranging from cut and cover proposals under Davey/Macquarie Streets to large scale bored tunnels running from the Southern Outlet through to the Tasman Bridge.
