= Sandy Bay Road =

Road in Hobart, Tasmania

Sandy Bay Road Tasmania
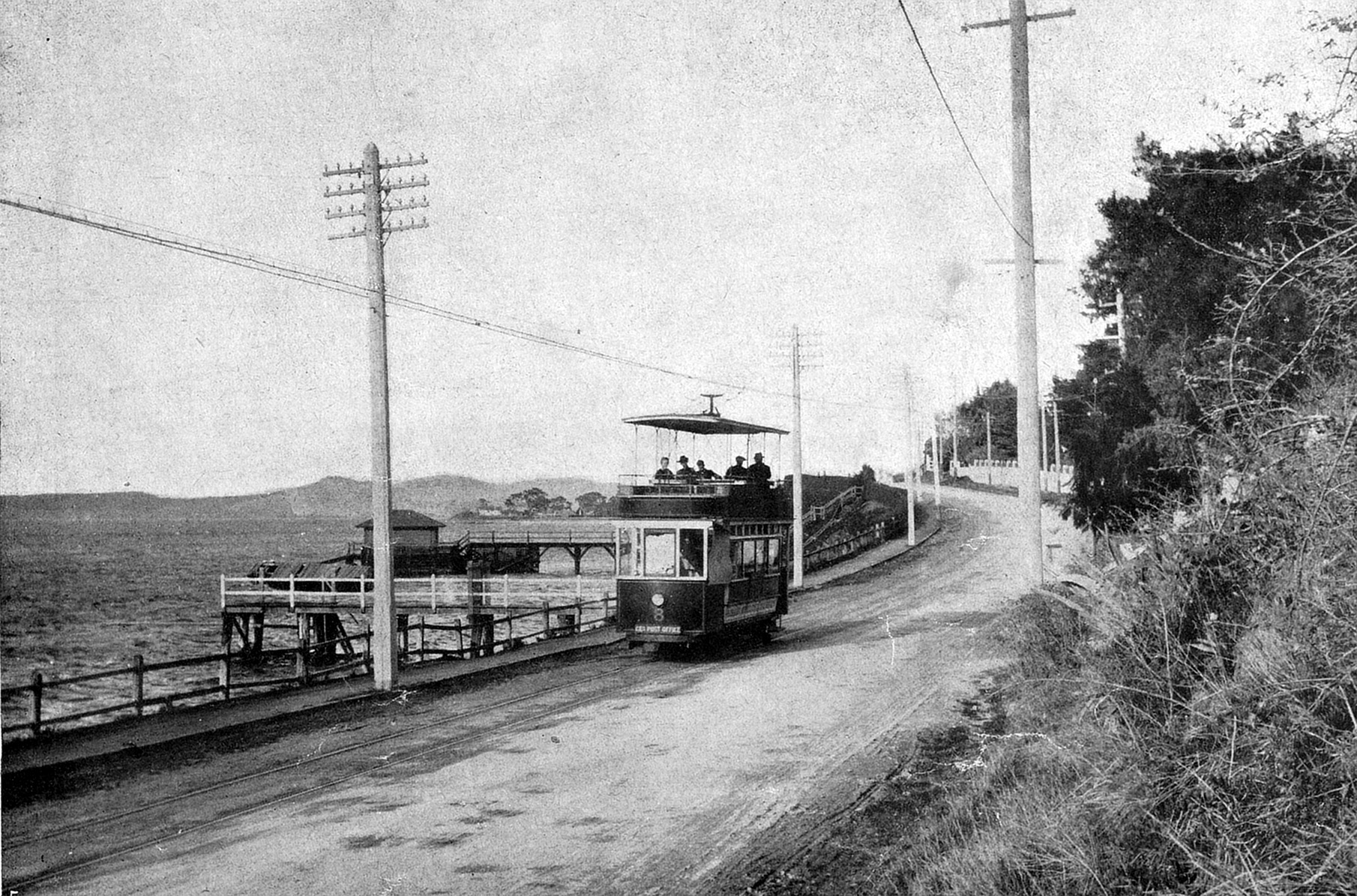
- Sandy Bay Road in 1918 with a double-decker tram

General information
- Type: Road
- Length: 12 km (7.5 mi)
- Opened: 19th century
- Route number(s): B68
- Former route number: State Route 6

Major junctions
- North end: Davey Street, Hobart CBD
- South end: Channel Highway; Taroona

Location(s)
- Region: Hobart
- Major suburbs: Battery Point, Sandy Bay, Lower Sandy Bay, Taroona

Sandy Bay Road (Route B68) is a key arterial road in Tasmania that connects the southeastern edge of the Hobart central business district with the southeastern suburb of Taroona. It spans approximately 12 kilometres, providing both scenic views and access to several historic sites and modern amenities. The road begins as a continuation of Harrington Street near its intersection with Davey Street and follows a primarily southward path.

== Route Description ==
Sandy Bay Road begins on the southeastern edge of Hobart’s CBD, extending southwards alongside the western edge of St David's Park and bypassing the historic suburb of Battery Point. It then enters Sandy Bay, passing notable sites such as Wrest Point Hotel Casino, Australia's first legal casino.

Continuing south, the road travels along the western shore of the River Derwent, hugging the river through Lower Sandy Bay and along Long Beach. The road provides access to several parks, beaches, and recreational areas. In Lower Sandy Bay, Sandy Bay Road passes the Alexandra Battery, a historic defensive structure with views over the Derwent River.

As it continues toward Taroona, Sandy Bay Road begins to climb slightly, eventually connecting to the Channel Highway, which continues southwards to other towns along the coast. The road is designated as route B68.

== History ==
Sandy Bay Road was first established as a colonial track in the early 19th century, initially serving as a vital connection between Hobart and the southern settlements. Early maps and artworks depict a rugged path tracing the river’s western edge, which was widened over the decades to accommodate increased traffic as Hobart expanded. By the early 20th century, the road was surfaced with bitumen. In the late 19th and early 20th centuries, Sandy Bay Road was a key route for Hobart’s public transport network. Trams initially operated along the road, connecting Hobart to Lower Sandy Bay. The tram lines were later replaced by trolleybuses, which continued to serve the road until the mid-20th century. This public transit history is commemorated by several historic photographs and local heritage markers along the route.

== Notable Landmarks ==
- Wrest Point Hotel Casino: Australia's first legal casino, located along Sandy Bay Road, is a major Hobart landmark and tourism site.
- Alexandra Battery: This coastal defense installation overlooks Long Beach and is a popular historical site with interpretive signage.
- Long Beach: A popular beach and recreational area with views over the River Derwent, frequently used for local events and outdoor activities.
- St David's Park: Near the northern end of the road, this historic park features landscaped gardens, memorials, and remnants of Hobart's early cemetery.
- 5–7 Sandy Bay Road: Modernist building constructed as ABC-TV's first purpose-built television studio in Tasmania. Later served as the home of the Tasmanian Conservatorium of Music before being sold to Singaporean developer Fragrance Group in 2017.

== Developments ==
Sandy Bay Road has undergone improvements in recent years to support increased vehicular and pedestrian traffic. Bike lanes have been added in sections to encourage transport diversification, and safety upgrades such as lighting, signage and sidewalks have been upgraded near schools and commercial intersections.

== Sources ==
- Jitprapaikulsarn, S. (2003). Researching cycling safety: using cyclists perceptions and other measures to make recommendations for Sandy Bay, Tasmania (Master of Environmental Management thesis). University of Tasmania. doi:10.25959/23205368.v1.
