= Southern Outlet, Hobart =

Highway in Hobart, Tasmania, Australia

Southern Outlet Tasmania
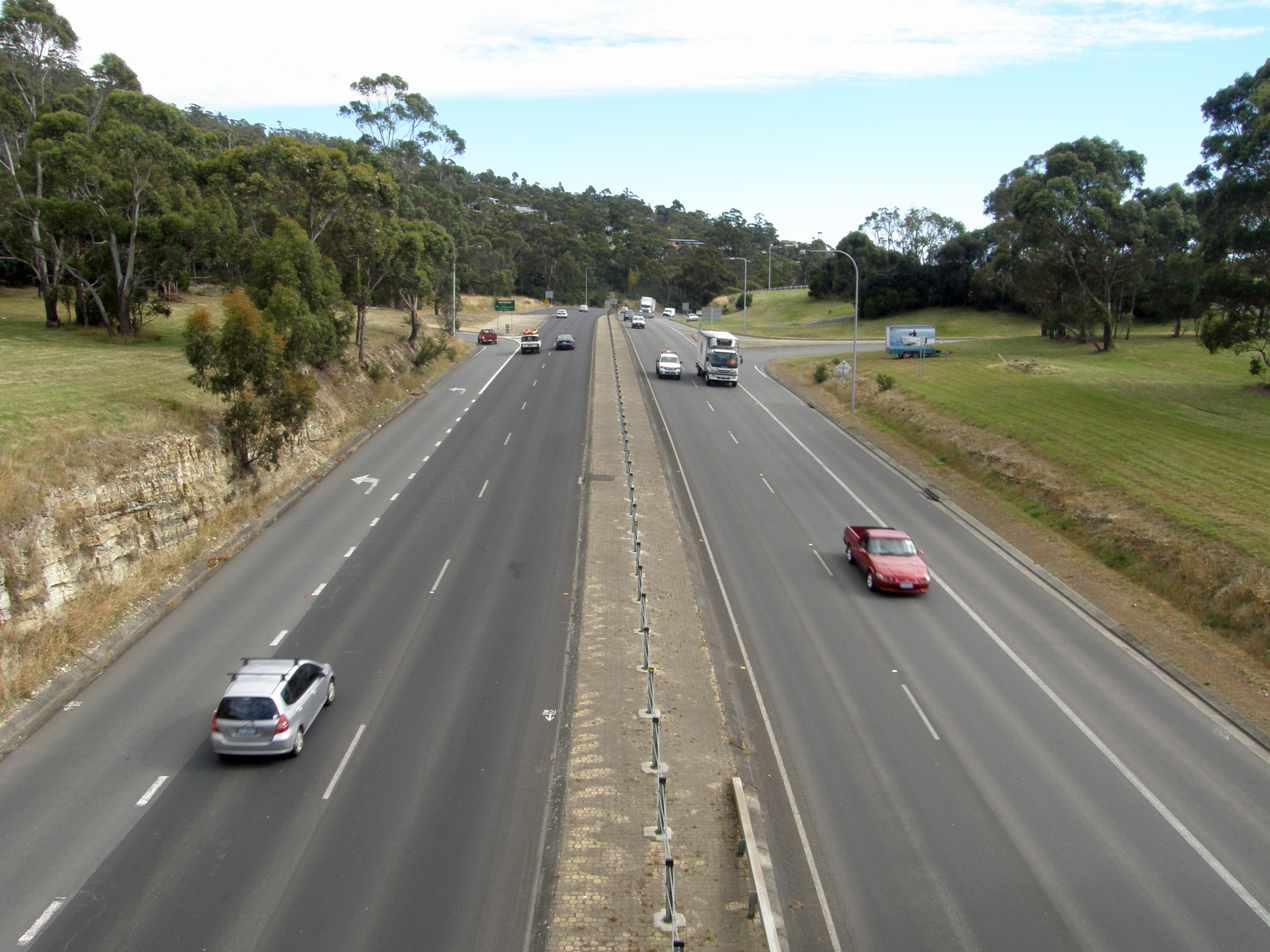
- The Southern Outlet at Mount Nelson

General information
- Type: Highway
- Length: 13 km (8.1 mi)
- Opened: 1969
- Route number(s): A6

Major junctions
- North end: Davey Street / Macquarie Street, Hobart
- Huon Highway / Kingston Bypass for full list see Exits
- South end: Channel Highway, Kingston

Location(s)
- Region: Hobart
- Major suburbs: Mount Nelson

Highway system
- Highways in Australia; National Highway • Freeways in Australia; Highways in Tasmania

The Southern Outlet is a major highway in Hobart, Tasmania, providing a vital connection between the Hobart city centre and the southern suburbs, including Kingston and Huonville. It is one of Hobart's three major radial highways and a key commuter route, carrying more than 31,000 vehicles daily.

Built in 1969, the highway links Hobart to Kingston, bypassing several suburbs and acting as a fast, grade-separated route through bushland and the mountainous terrain of Mount Nelson.

== Route ==
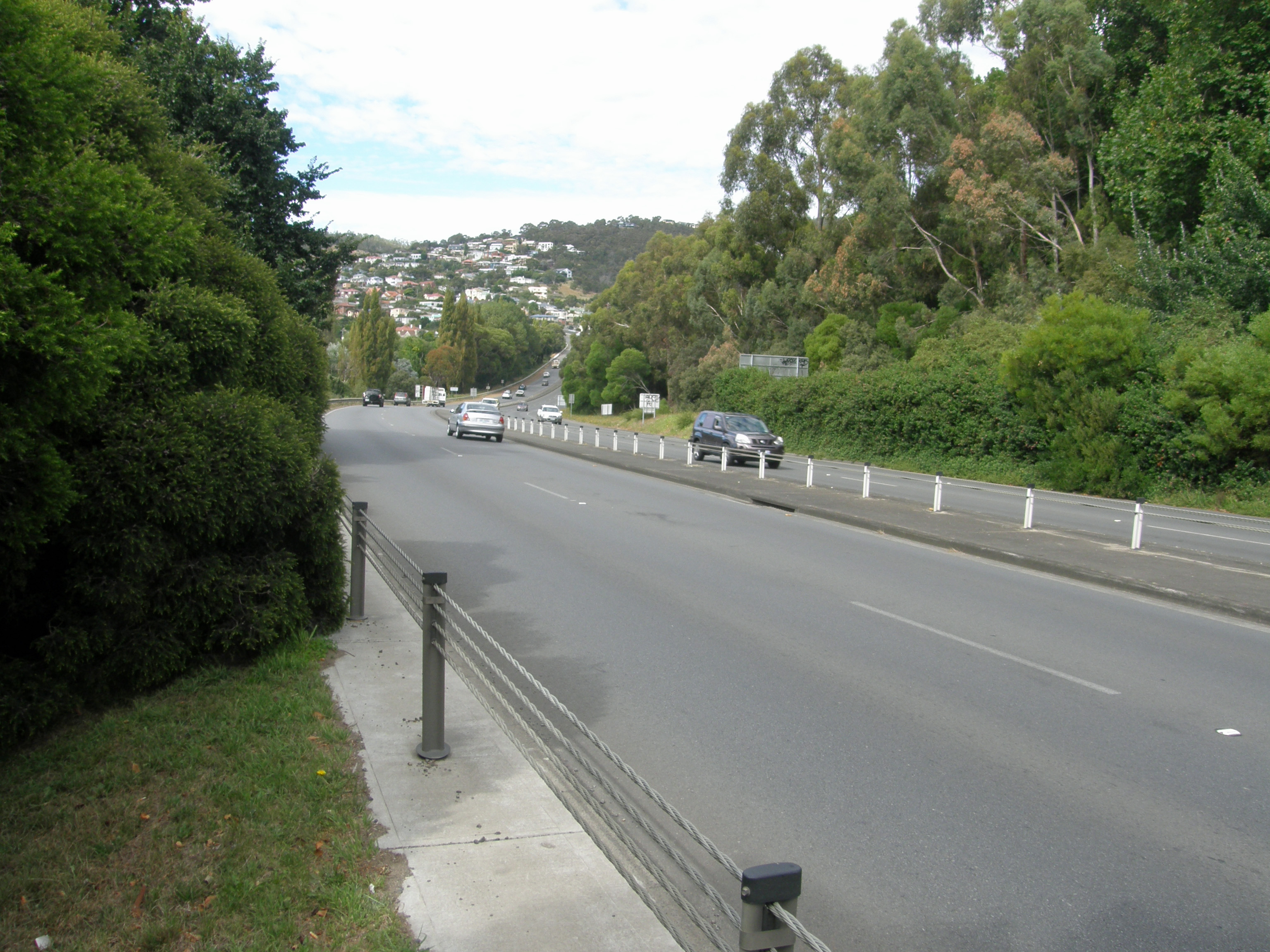
The Southern Outlet

The Southern Outlet begins at the intersection with Davey Street and Macquarie Street in Hobart's central business district, where the maximum speed is limited to 80 km/h. As it leaves Hobart, the highway bypasses the suburb of South Hobart and ascends Mount Nelson, offering scenic views of the surrounding area.

From the Tolmans Hill overpass, the highway becomes fully grade-separated, with dual carriageways for northbound and southbound traffic. This section of the highway, which continues through the bushland, has a higher speed limit of 100 km/h due to its separation and safety design. The Southern Outlet terminates in Kingston, at the Kingston Interchange, where it meets the Channel Highway and the Kingston Bypass.

== History ==
The Southern Outlet was born out of the recommendations from the Hobart Area Transportation Study, which identified the need for a new transport corridor to ease congestion and improve access between Hobart and Kingston, as well as the rapidly growing southern suburbs. Construction began in the late 1960s, and the highway was officially opened in 1969 as a single-lane, dual-carriageway expressway.

Initially, the highway linked Hobart with the old Huon Highway near Grove. However, following population growth in Kingston and the surrounding areas, the Southern Outlet underwent significant upgrades, and in 1990 it was converted into a full dual-carriageway highway.

In 2011, the construction of the Kingston Bypass further enhanced traffic flow, creating a more efficient link between the Southern Outlet and the growing residential and commercial zones in Kingston and Blackmans Bay.

== Future developments ==
The Southern Outlet is undergoing significant changes aimed at improving traffic flow between Hobart and its southern suburbs. A major part of the current plan is the construction of a fifth lane, designed to function as a transit lane (T3 lane) for vehicles carrying three or more people, buses, taxis, motorbikes, and emergency vehicles. This new lane aims to alleviate congestion, particularly during peak hours, for commuters from Kingston, the Huon Valley, and other southern suburbs.

This development has faced several challenges. Initially estimated at $51 million, the project has experienced substantial cost overruns, largely due to unexpected issues such as the risk of rock falls during construction, as well as design complications related to Hobart's mountainous terrain. The revised budget is now expected to be significantly higher, although the exact amount remains unclear.

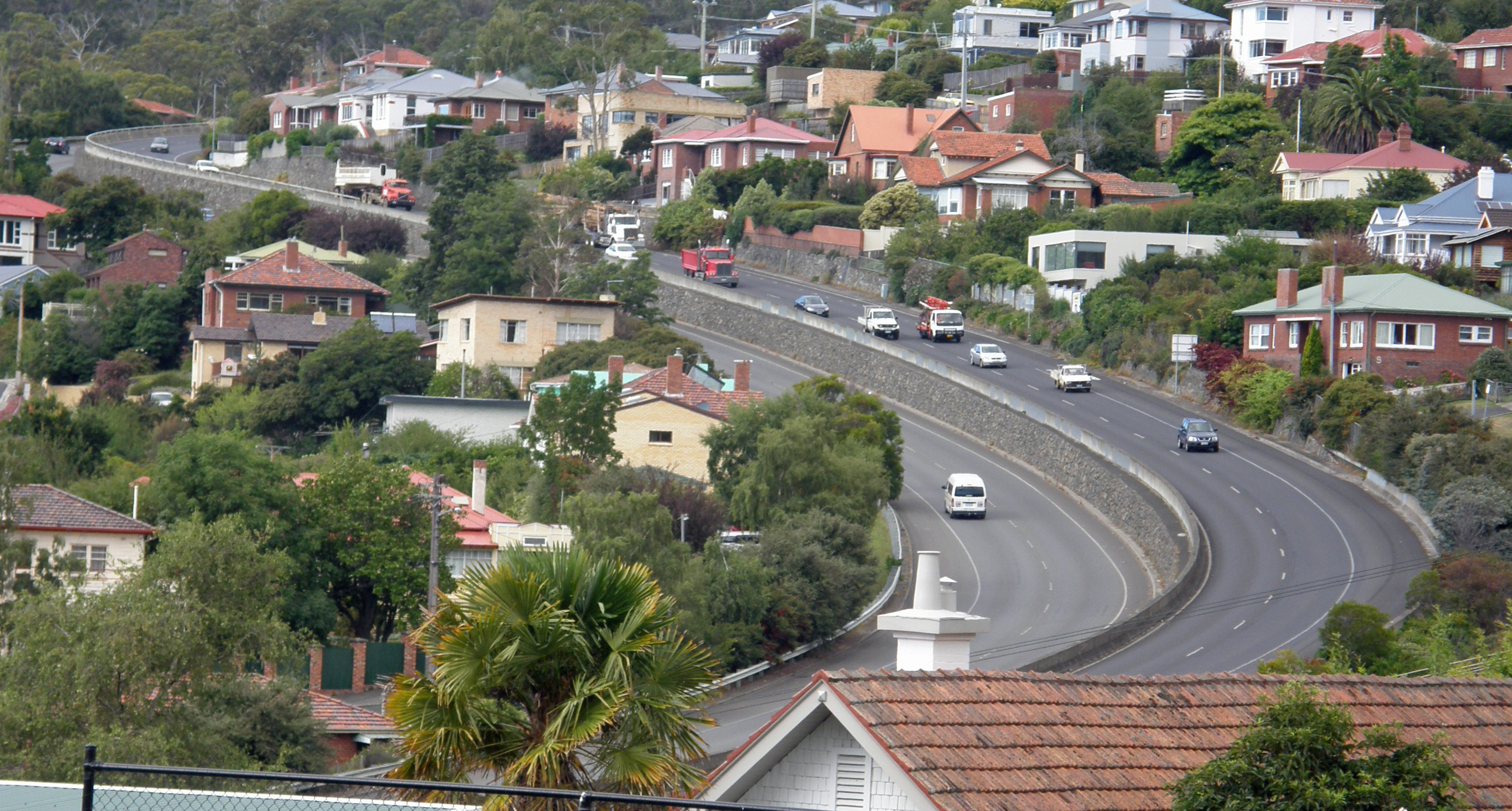
Homes in Dynnyrne being demolished for Southern Outlet expansion

Additionally, the project has led to the demolition of three homes on Dynnyrne Road, with demolition works ongoing since late 2023. This followed an earlier proposal to acquire 17 properties, which was later scaled back. Local residents and community groups have voiced concerns about the project, arguing that expanding roads may lead to increased traffic in the already congested city center rather than providing long-term solutions.

The project is slated for completion by 2025, with construction of the transit lane beginning in early 2024. Despite the controversy, the Tasmanian government maintains that this upgrade is essential for managing the growing population and traffic demands of Hobart's southern suburbs.

== Exits ==
LGA	Location	km	mi	Destinations	Notes
Hobart	South Hobart	0.0– 0.1	0.0– 0.062	Davey Street & Macquarie Street one-way couplet (A6) northeast / Davey Street (B64) southwest / Macquarie Street southwest – Hobart, South Hobart	Northern terminus at Macquarie Street (northbound lanes); southbound lanes begin from Davey Street
Hobart	Tolmans Hill – Dynnyrne boundary	2.7	1.7	Olinda Grove (C643) - Mount Nelson, Tolmans Hill	
Kingborough	Kingston	4.6	2.9	Proctors Road	No Through Road
Kingborough	Kingston	6.3	3.9	Proctors Road – Kingston	Southbound exit and entrance
Kingborough	Kingston	7.6	4.7	Shaw Road – Kingston	Northbound exit and entrance
Kingborough	Kingston	8.8	5.5	Groningen Road – no exit	Northbound entrance only
Kingborough	Kingston	9.3	5.8	Browns Road - Firthside	Southbound exit only
Kingborough	Kingston	9.3– 9.6	5.8– 6.0	Huon Highway (A6) / Kingston Bypass (B68) - Kingston, Huonville, Blackmans Bay, Kettering	Southern terminus: continues as Kingston Bypass; no access to Huon Highway from Kingston Bypass
Incomplete access
