= Trolleybuses in Hobart =

Hobart trolleybus system
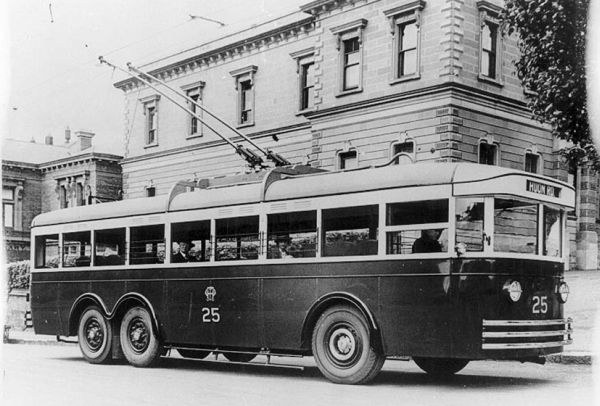
- Hobart's first trolleybus in 1935

Operation
- Locale: Hobart, Tasmania, Australia
- Open: 29 October 1935
- Close: 22 November 1968
- Status: Closed
- Operators: Hobart City Council; Metropolitan Transport Trust

Statistics
- Route length: 22 km (14 mi)

The Hobart trolleybus system operated in Hobart, Tasmania, Australia from 1935 until 1968.

== History ==
The Hobart trolleybus system opened on 29 October 1935 when a route from the Hobart City Centre to South Hobart commenced replacing a tram. Starting at Hobart Town Hall in Argyle Street it travelled along Macquarie Street, Davey Street and Huon Road terminating at the intersection with Congress Street.

On 14 October 1937, a second route began running to New Town station and in mid-1939 was extended to Cornelian Bay. A further service to Cascades commenced on 24 August 1942, being extended along Strickland Avenue on 11 October 1948. Further lines opened to Dynnyrne on 4 June 1945 and Sandy Bay on 7 December 1952.

On 1 March 1955, operation of the network passed from the Hobart City Council to the Metropolitan Transport Trust. A final line opened to West Hobart on 23 February 1958. At this stage the network, extended for 22 kilometres. In February 1967, much of the Strickland Avenue route infrastructure and one bus was destroyed by fire.

The Cornelian Bay line closed in 1959 with the rest of the network closing in stages in 1968.

== Services ==
Hobart's trolleybus routes were as follows:

Route	Extension	Opened	Closed
Hobart City Centre - South Hobart		29 October 1935	22 November 1968
Hobart - New Town		14 October 1937	23 August 1968
	New Town - Cornelian Bay	1939	30 March 1959
Hobart - Cascades		24 August 1942	22 November 1968
	Cascades - Strickland Avenue	11 October 1948	22 November 1968
Hobart - Dynnyrne		4 June 1945	22 November 1968
Hobart - Sandy Bay		7 December 1952	11 October 1968
Hobart - West Hobart		23 February 1958	23 August 1968

== Fleet ==
Operations commenced with a single Leyland TTB bodied by Hobart Municipal Tramways. A further four were acquired in 1937. Between 1939 and 1946, 22 Leyland TB5s were purchased. Between 1950 and 1952, 36 BUT ETB/1s bodied by City Body Works were delivered with the five Leyland TTBs withdrawn in 1953. In 1964, five second-hand BUT RETB/1s were purchased from Launceston.

BUT ETB/1 no. 235 has been preserved by the Tasmanian Transport Museum.

Image	Fleet nos.	Quantity	Chassis	Body	Year	Notes
	25	1	Leyland TTB	Hobart Municipal Tramways	1935	renumbered 65 in 1946
	66-69	4	Leyland TTB	Hobart Municipal Tramways	1937	
	70-91	22	Leyland TB5	Hobart Municipal Tramways	1939-1946	72 renumbered 92 in October 1958
	201-236	36	BUT ETB/1	City Body Works	1950-1952	body frames manufactured by Commonwealth Engineering, Sydney
	237-241	5	BUT RETB/1	JA Lawton & Sons	1950	ex Launceston 326-330

== Depot ==
Initially housed at the city tram depot on the corner of Macquarie and Campbell Streets, in 1944 a trolleybuses depot opened on Collins Street. On 29 October 1954, a new depot opened on Davey Street.
