= Trams in Hobart =

Tram network in Hobart, Australia

Hobart tramway network
- Hobart double-decker trams showing how exposed the upper decks were to the elements

Operation
- Locale: Hobart, Tasmania, Australia
- Open: 1893
- Close: 1968
- Lines: 8
- Owners: Hobart Electric Tram Company (1893–1913); Hobart City Council (1913–1955); Tasmanian Government (1955–1968)
- Operators: Hobart Electric Tram Company (1893–1913); Hobart Municipal Tramways (1913–1955); Metropolitan Transport Trust (1955–1968)

Statistics
Tram era: 1893–1960
- Track gauge: 1,067 mm (3 ft 6 in)
- Propulsion system: Single overhead electric line
- Route length: 32 kilometres
Trolleybus era: 1935–1968
- Propulsion system: Twin overhead electric line

Trams in Hobart operated in Hobart, Tasmania, Australia between 1893 and 1960. It was the first complete electric tram system in the Southern Hemisphere, and the only one in Australia to operate double-decker trams.

Opened in 1893 by a private consortium, the network was taken over in 1913 by the Hobart City Council, who ran a successful network for much of the early twentieth century, reaching its peak in 1937. Following the introduction of trolleybuses in 1935, the growth of car ownership after World War II, and the State Government takeover of municipal transport networks in 1955, the system closed in 1960.

== History ==
=== Necessity ===
Hobart's population was growing, and by 1892 it had risen to around 24,000 living within the city boundaries, with the total population over 35,000. In an area approximately the size of a square mile, Hobart had no public transport service and relied on horse-drawn cabs and omnibuses to access out-lying towns and regions. Hobart had begun to grow and develop, and was slowly constructing the features and resources expected of a modern European city. By the late nineteenth century most major cities in Europe were developing public transport systems such as underground railways or tram networks, and the citizens of Hobart were calling for something similar for their town.

=== Proposal ===
In 1884 a syndicate of 40 people formed to create a tramway company, each contributing £4 as capital. The Tasmanian Government supported it, and a private bill was introduced to parliament. The Hobart Tramway Company's Act 1884 gave authority to the syndicate to construct, maintain and work tramways in the city of Hobart and gave them the freedom of choosing motive power, including electricity. This venture failed after unsuccessfully seeking finance in London.

A new syndicate was formed by 24 prominent citizens, each contributing £1,000 capital each. The syndicate was formed with the assistance of Henry Dobson, who was a senior member of legal firm Dobson, Mitchell & Allport, and who would be Premier when the tramways commenced. The act was amended to be the Hobart Tramway Company's Amendment Act 1889, which described the proposed routes of New Town, Cascades and Sandy Bay, as well as providing a time frame of completion in four years. Company directors included Charles Grant, an engineer who came to Tasmania as superintendent for the Tasmanian Main Line Company, John Syme, director of the Cascade Brewery, and Edward Braddon, prominent politician and Tasmania's Agent-General in London.

=== Development ===
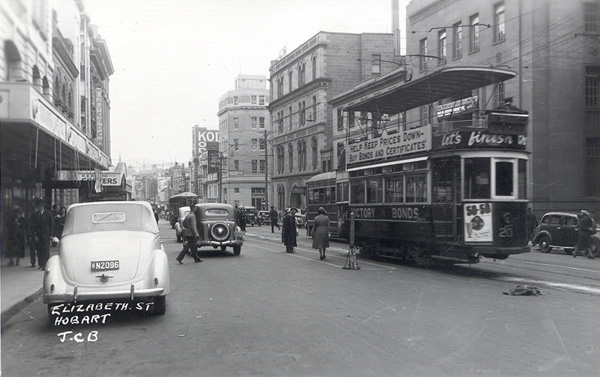
A Hobart double-deck tram travelling past the General Post Office

The government had reservations about electrification, and countered the original electrified proposal with a new proposal which allowed for steam powered trams to operation on a 3’6" (106.68 cm) gauge track. The government wished for the first line opened to be 2.485 miles (four kilometres) of track on along Macquarie Street and Cascade Road, providing transport for workers at the Cascade Brewery. Despite the government's insistence, the project's backers would not be swayed, and with the legislative approval having already passed, the British entrepreneurs registered the Hobart Electric Tramway Company in 1886. One of the businessmen, Charles Henry Grant, personally floated the company in London. The same year they built and displayed a model tramway in the Hobart Town Hall in order to raise support for their electrified system.

=== Construction and electrification ===
It had not been initially clear what the government's opposition to electrification was, but it seems to have been a combination of initial public skepticism to a new-found and little understood energy source, and the lobbying of the powerful local gas suppliers, who saw a new threat to their monopoly over street lighting and household supply. Despite the agonising delay, the London consortium persisted with their proposal and were finally rewarded eight years after the legislation had passed when a contract was eventually let in 1892 to the London firm of Siemens Brothers for the construction of an electrified system.

Siemens had tendered for the contract at a below market value price, as they had hoped that by establishing an easily affordable, successful network in a fairly small city, the Hobart tram network would act as advertising for their products in the Australasian market, in which the company was hoping to expand. Siemens Brothers initially constructed three routes. The first of which ran from the Hobart railway station along the originally proposed route to the Cascade Brewery, a second route departed from Elizabeth Street outside the General Post Office and ran along Sandy Bay Road, and the third route ran northwards along Elizabeth Street to Moonah.

== Heyday ==
After nearly 10 years of political wrangling, construction, and delays caused by the overhead electric lines interfering with telephone systems, the first line opened on 23 September 1893, making it the first complete electric tramway system to be established in the Southern Hemisphere. In a world first, the Hobart tram network operated entirely double-decker trams, although these soon proved to have difficulties navigating on Hobart's hillier routes. The Hobart network was also the first tramway to use sliding bow collectors to collect the power from the overhead wires, borrowing the technology from electrified 'heavy' rail networks in Europe. The Hobart tram network soon proved to be popular for commuters, and began to expand. Single deck trams were introduced in 1906, mainly for the routes on which double-deckers experienced problems.

Hobart City Council had never felt completely happy about a privately run public transport network over which they exerted little control, and were also aggrieved that the Hobart Electric Tramway Company had not accepted their model for the tramways in the initial design stages. At the time it was widely felt amongst Australian councils that public transport systems would be best served by public ownership. As many other councils across Australia were doing at the time, the Hobart City Council sought to forcibly take control of the London-based Hobart Electric Tramway Company in 1911. Lawyers for the company successfully fought off an initial take-over attempt, forcing the Hobart City Council to consult with the State Government about a future take-over.

Two years later the State Government passed the Tramways Bill giving the council the right in law to control the trams. On 3 June 1913 Hobart City Council terminated Hobart Electric Tramways perpetual franchise. The company was compulsorily bought out by the council, and control transferred to the government-operated Hobart Municipal Tramways.

Hobart Municipal Tramways and the Hobart City Council began an expansion programme which doubled the size of the network within ten years. The network's growth was barely affected by the outbreak of World War I. The tramways expanded rapidly, and suburban growth followed the lines, spurred on by the availability of a cheap and efficient commuter service. By the mid-1920s tramlines ran from the city depot to North Hobart, Lenah Valley, Springfield, Glenorchy, Cascade Brewery, Proctor's Road and Sandy Bay.

The Hobart Metropolitan Tramways reached a peak in popularity in the 1930s and 1940s, with a busy profitable network covering over 32 km of track, operating along eight lines. The Sandy Bay branch from the city towards Sandy Bay and Nutgrove beaches proved especially popular in summer months.

=== Demise and closure ===
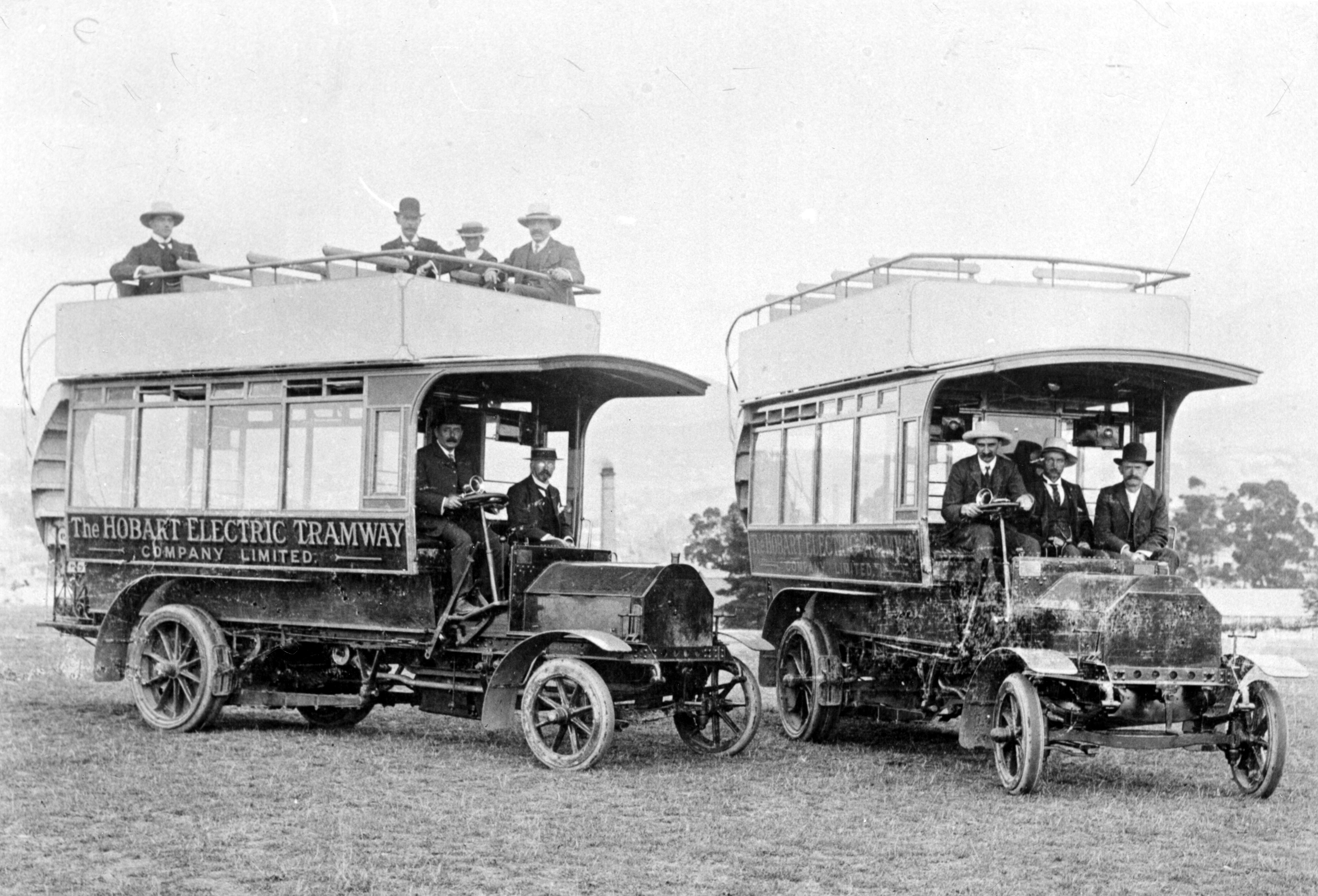
Newly arrived Daimler diesel buses on the Domain

During World War II and in the immediate post-war period pressure from increased private car ownership and diesel-powered buses began to threaten the popularity of trams in Hobart, and both passenger rail and the Hobart tramways were experiencing economic trouble. HMT had commenced trolleybus services in 1935 with the Huon Road route, which followed Macquarie Street up the Cascades route as far as Darcy Street, and then continued to a terminus where the main road to the Huon Valley left the built up area, and began the long climb over the side of Mount Wellington. The success of the trolley buses on this route showed HMT management that the more flexible trolley buses were suitable for use on Hobart's roads. 1942 had seen the Macquarie Street Line to Cascades final replacement of trams with double-decker trolley buses which had a greater passenger capacity. It was another ten years before any further changes to the network took place. By 1950 the public had become increasingly unhappy with the congestion and the state of maintenance on Sandy Bay Road. Hobart City Council decided that in conjunction with the major roadworks required to improve Sandy Bay Road, it would replace the tram lines with trolley buses along that route as well.

In 1949 the Hobart Municipal Tramways became the first system anywhere in the world to use an automatic conversion system from AC to DC current, continuing its history of innovation. But after considerable debate, the council took the decision in 1950 to abolish the tramways completely. However, the public reliance on the system meant that the council foresaw it would take at least 15 to 20 years to replace it effectively.

The State Government of Robert Cosgrove had grown tired of the council's increasingly poor management of the public transport system and a local controversy over fare levels. In 1955 a new statewide statutory authority, the Metropolitan Transport Trust (MTT) was formed, and this entity took over the Hobart Tramways, as well as the Launceston Municipal Tramways on 1 March 1955, and in 1960 it also acquired Norton Coaches. Burnie giving the State Government control of public transport in the whole state. Forty-two years earlier the Hobart City Council had battled for over two years to gain control of the tram network, and it had been taken off them by a single decision of the State Government.

By mid-1960, the MTT had decided to close the tramways completely in favour of a combined network of electric-powered trolley buses and diesel-powered buses, and their accelerated programme of closures saw the final Hobart tram run its last route on 21 October 1960. By 1968, the trolley buses had also been replaced in favour of a bus network. Most of the tram tracks were covered over or removed by subsequent roadworks, although traces can still be seen along some routes. Most of the cars were also scrapped, except for one double bogie tram, number 141, which was saved and transported to the Tasmanian Transport Museum at Glenorchy.

The Hobart tram network had been the first in the southern hemisphere to be electrified, and was the first in the world to operate entirely double-decker trams. It operated on eight lines for 67 years, before it was replaced by a bus network operated by the Metropolitan Transport Trust in 1960.

== Network ==
The original network had consisted of three main routes. The Macquarie Street line (also known as the Cascades line), the Sandy Bay line, and the Elizabeth Street line, totalling about 12 kilometres of track. After Hobart City Council took over the network in 1913, they embarked on an expansion programme which saw the Hobart Tram Network quickly grow over the next ten years to its maximum extent of eight lines, with some extra branch lines. By the mid-1920s tramlines ran from the city depot to North Hobart, Lenah Valley, Springfield, Glenorchy, Cascade Brewery, Proctor's Road, and Sandy Bay. The network reached its maximum size between 1934 and 1942, when the total network length was 17 miles (32 kilometres). The Macquarie Street tram routes to Cascades, Proctor's Road (Dynnyrne) and Sandy Bay had been replaced by trolley buses between 1942 and 1952.

=== Macquarie Street line ===
The Macquarie Street line was the first to operate, commencing service on 23 September 1893. It ran from its terminus at the corner of Park and Liverpool streets, near Hobart railway station at the south end of Queens Domain westward along Macquarie Street to its far terminus at Cascade Brewery. Trolley buses were extended to Cascades on 5 April 1954.

==== Proctor's Road branch ====
The Proctor's Road branch took the left turn off Macquarie Street, and followed Proctor's Road through Dynnyrne, without turning off.

=== Elizabeth Street line ===
The second of the original lines, the Elizabeth Street line also commenced operation on 23 September 1893, and originally began at General Post Office, and travelled north long the incline of Elizabeth Street, through North Hobart, New Town and onto Moonah as far as Albert Road.

Before the construction of the Brooker Highway in 1961, this was the main north–south artery of Hobart, and often became exceedingly congested. Between Augusta Road in Lenah Valley and New Town, Elizabeth Street becomes New Town Road, but continues uninterrupted, despite the name change. Past New Town, New Town Road becomes Main Road, but line was still called the Elizabeth Street line in these sections.

The Elizabeth Street line was the most heavily trafficked route on the Hobart tram network, and The Mercury of 25 May 1951 reported that 132 trams left the GPO on the Elizabeth St routes each weekday between 16:00 and 18:12.

The Elizabeth Street line was the most heavily used, and the Springfield branch line had the honour of being the last to cease tram operations in October 1960.

==== Lenah Valley branch line ====
The Lenah Valley line was a single track branch line off the Elizabeth Street line to Moonah. In North Hobart, the track diverted westwards along Augusta Road. The second (Montagu Street) and third (Giblin Street) loops could only accommodate a single bogie car, and so a Giblin Street service was provided halfway between each Lenah Valley service at peak hours.

==== Springfield branch line ====
The Springfield branch line was a fairly short spur that diverted westwards off the Elizabeth Street line. It was a tram from Hobart GPO to Springfield in December 1960, which was the final service to run on the Hobart tramways.

=== Sandy Bay line ===
The third of the original lines, the Sandy Bay line commenced operation on 23 September 1893, and ran from City Depot up Macquarie Street, into Murray Street, up Davey Street to the corner of Sandy Bay Road, where it turned towards Sandy Bay, and followed Sandy Bay Road as far as Heathorn Avenue.

The Sandy Bay line had its trams phased out between 1942 and 1952, with the final tram running in December of that year.

=== Liverpool Street line ===
The Liverpool Street line, also known as the West Hobart line, commenced at Hobart railway station, and travelled up Liverpool Street through the Hobart CBD, before beginning to climb westwards into the foothills of Mount Wellington. It was a double track to Warwick Street, except for two sections where the curve or narrowness of the road required a single contraflow section of track.

This line was exceptionally heavily used, and during peak hour traffic, it was usual for two cars to run each scheduled service. On certain occasions, even three cars were operated in conjunction for the run as far as Warwick Street.

The Liverpool Street line crossed the Elizabeth Street line on the level at the junction which is now the northern end of the Elizabeth Street Mall, but its only connection to the rest of the network was a single line in Park and lower Macquarie Streets in front of the Hobart tram depot.

The last trams to operate on the Liverpool Street line completed service in 1958.

== Depots ==
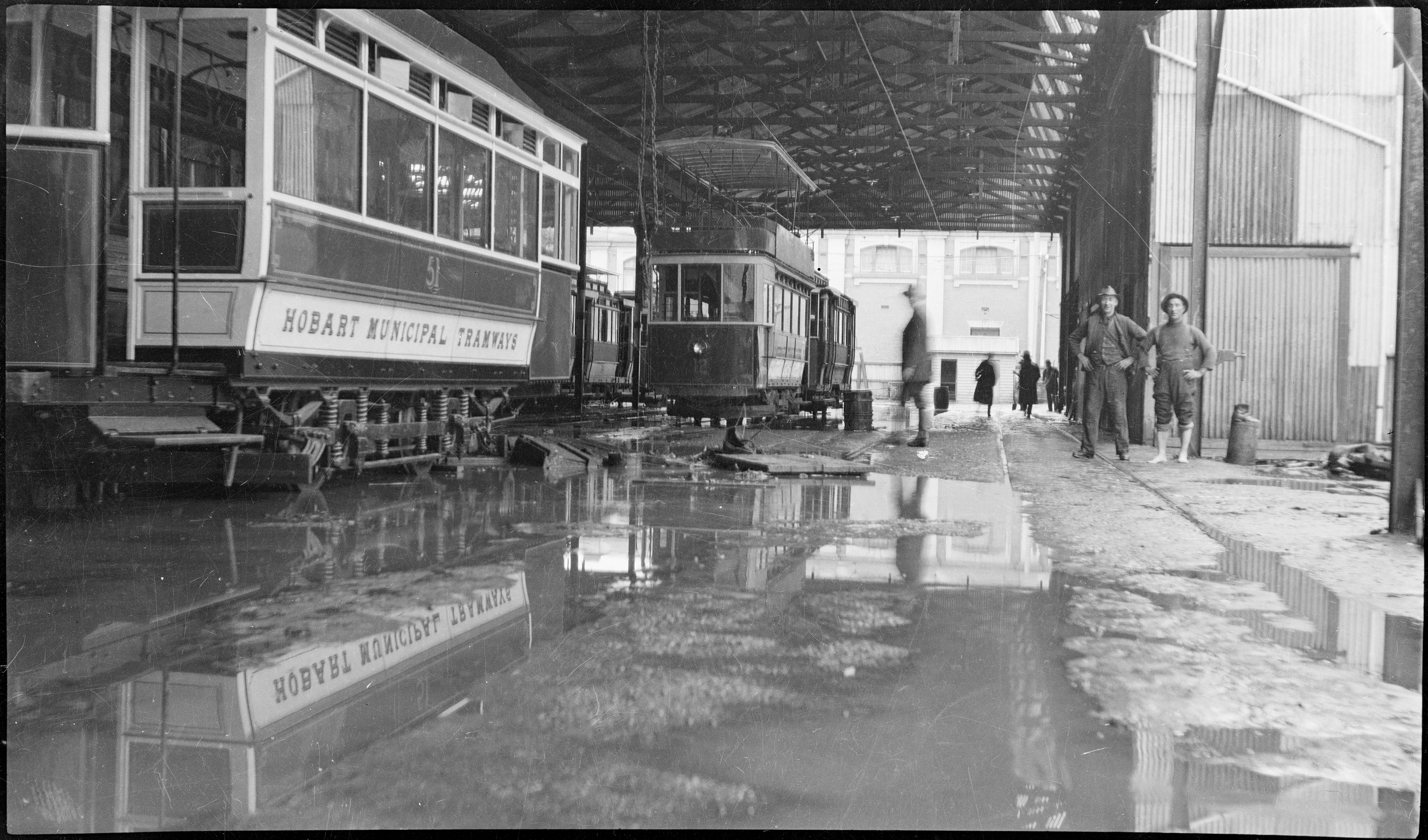
Hobart Municipal Tramways shed after a flood

- City Depot served the entirety of the network. Opened in 1893, it was located on lower Macquarie Street, adjacent to the Hobart Gas Works. The depot also housed Hobart's trolleybuses, which began operating in 1935. The depot continued to be used as a bus depot up until closed in September 1995. It was sold and redeveloped into the Hotel Grand Chancellor and residential townhouses. The original offices, store and entrance arches to the depot all remain, with the latter being incorporated into newly built structures. The connection with the area has also been recognised, with the original entrance lane to the depot being made into a road named Terminus Row.
- Moonah Depot served Glenorchy and Lenah Valley, and aided in alleviating space shortages in the City Depot. Initially starting life as a storage shelter purchased by the tramways in 1910, it was not until 1924 that it was developed into a larger depot, complete with its own sub-station. The depot came to accommodate 36 trams on six lines, and mainly housed double-deckers. This depot lasted until 1975, being demolished in March 1983. It was located on Main Road, Moonah, near its junction with Florence Street, and close to Cooleys Hotel.

== Main line connections ==
Although there was never any deliberate integration, the primary city depot was located close by to Hobart railway station, provided a simple pedestrian connection between the depot and the mainline rail services. Further access to mainline services could be achieved by getting off the Elizabeth Street line in Moonah, or Glenorchy, where Moonah station, Derwent Park station and Glenorchy station were all within a short walking distance of the tram line.

== Rollingstock ==
Upon commencement in 1893, the initial fleet comprised twenty double-deck Siemens-built tram cars. The top deck was open-sided but covered by a roof, and both driving ends were exposed. These were numbered 1 to 20, and all remained in service until 1928.

Hobart Electric Tramway Company self-built their first car (number 22) in 1903, but it only lasted in service until 1915. One maximum traction double-decker was built by Brush Traction in 1904, and served as a prototype for a fleet which was never built. It remained in service until 1918, and was scrapped in 1925. 1906 saw the introduction of the first single-deck cars, which came in both four wheel, and double-bogie (eight-wheel) varieties.

The Double-Decker fleet was expanded to 40 cars, which were all built between 1905 and 1925. These were numbered to 61, although not in a continuous block, as numbers were reused when the old Siemens cars were taken out of service. The last double-deckers to be built were the numbers 62, 63 and 64, which unlike their open-topped predecessors, featured enclosed upper-cabins. Only one old car, tram #56, was retro-fitted with an enclosed roof in the style of the 62-64 cars. Tram #63 car over-turned on a tight corner in 1946 and was scrapped. In 1946 the maximum fleet size was achieved with 76 cars in total running. That year saw the decision taken to reduce the fleet in line with declining rider-ship, and 9 cars were scrapped in that year. After three major derailments all resulted in overturning double-deckers the remaining 31 double-deck cars were cut down to single-deck between 1947 and 1948. Three further cars were withdrawn in 1948, six more in 1951, and the remaining double-deck cars were withdrawn in 1954. The rebuilt number 56 was the last double-deck tram in Hobart service.

== Accidents ==
The first recorded fatality on Hobart's tram network occurred in early 1894. An elderly farmer, Thomas Anderson, was returning home to Bismarck, when his horse became spooked by the 2pm New Town tram operated by Driver Rosendale. They met near the city boundary at Federal Street and Anderson's horse hit the side of the tram, throwing him into its path where he was run over. An inquiry cleared Driver Rosendale of any wrongdoing and the death was ruled as accidental, but it created further public debate around how trams and horses shared roadways. Ironically, the funeral procession of Anderson almost had a similar incident, with the leading hearse carrying Anderson's widow colliding with a passing tram.

Although a few minor accidents did occur, such as the overturning of the number 63 double-decker in 1946, there were relatively few accidents on the Hobart Tramways and most were minor. In the late 1930s there were also three derailments which all resulted in overturning double-deckers. Minor injuries were reported in all of these accidents, but no fatalities were caused. This series of accidents led to the decision to cut down the double-decker fleet to single-deck cars.

The worst accident on the Hobart tramways came on 29 April 1960 when tram 131 was struck by a lorry near the intersection of Elizabeth and Warwick Streets. The brakes failed as a result of the collision and the tram began to roll backwards down the steep gradient of Elizabeth Street during evening peak hour traffic. Some passengers managed to jump clear before the tram built up speed, whilst others sought refuge under their seats.

Despite being dazed by the collision, and rather than secure his own safety by jumping clear, tram conductor Raymond Donoghue guided the remaining passengers to the front of the vehicle (as it was rolling backwards), and warned motorists by continuing to ring the tram's bells and desperately trying to operate the emergency hand brakes to no avail. It is estimated that the tram built up a speed of 40 to 50 miles per hour (64 to 80 km/h). Eventually the tram collided violently with the front of the following number 137 tram, killing Donoghue instantly.

He had remained vigilantly at his post throughout the disaster and in his heroism he saved the lives of all of the passengers aboard, although 40 people were injured. Donoghue was awarded the George Cross for his actions. The accident provided a suitable excuse to the State Government for the overall withdrawal of the once popular tramways.

== Remains ==
There are few physical remains of the Hobart tram network still in existence. However the road surface along certain sections of the tramways routes still show evidence of them having previously been part of the tramway. For example, sections of Sandy Bay Road, and Macquarie Street towards Cascades have a different surface texture, and concrete sections which give an indication of where tracks once ran. This is the concrete put down to carry the weight of the trolley buses, but run on the same line. The tracks that run along the Hobart waterfront and docks area are sections of the rail system which service the docks but were not connected to the tram system

The only remaining part of the rollingstock in original condition is one single-deck double bogie tram Number 141, displayed at the Tasmanian Transport Museum at Glenorchy. It was the acquisition of this tram by a group of schoolboy enthusiasts which marked the birth of the museum.

In the early years of the 21st century, Hobart City Council managed to obtain and restore single deck number 39 tram to its 1917 condition, which it had intended for its Heritage Tramway. The restoration work was carried out by Tony Colman in 2000, who at the time worked as a furniture restorer for the Tasmanian Museum & Art Gallery. He also restored the number 17 double-deck car to its original 1915 condition as originally built for the Hobart Municipal Tramways. Both trams had brand new 3’6" (106.68 cm) gauge Brill 21e running trucks fitted by the Bendigo Tramways, as all original running gear had been scrapped upon their withdrawal.

Another tram, 118, which was a single-deck bogie saloon car built by Hobart Municipal Tramways in 1941, was recovered from a farm in Sorell, where it had lain abandoned since being withdrawn from service in 1960. As of 2008, Tony Colman was continuing its restoration including refitting replica original upholstery and operation metal frame windows. Bendigo Tramways will refit 3’6" (106.68 cm) gauge Melbourne & Metropolitan Tramways Board No. 9 trucks. This tram had originally been number 11, but was renumbered 118 in 1947, when all standard bogie cars were numbered in the one hundred range. This car had already been the third number 11, as two previous cars (1893–1914, and 1914–52) had borne the same car number. Similarly, tram number 133 was also recovered from a farm, this time in Bridgewater where it had also laid abandoned since 1960. It is currently stored at the Tasmanian Museum & Art Gallery's Moonah workshops. Tram number 120 was recovered from private ownership in Canberra in the Australian Capital Territory in June 2005, where it had been for twenty years. Prior to that it is believed to have been used as fishing shed in Interlaken in Tasmania's Central Highlands. It was originally built in 1936, and withdrawn in 1959.

== Preservation ==
Upon closure, the Tasmanian Transport Museum acquired one of the last trams built in Hobart, 141, from the Metropolitan Transport Trust. Since then, other private organisations and the Hobart City Council, have acquired and restored trams back to original condition.

Type	Number	Built	Withdrawn	Preserved	Condition	Status	Owner
Double-deck	7	1917	1951	1990s	Body only	Stored	Hobart City Council
Double-deck	17	1915	1954	1990s	Body only	Restored	Hobart City Council
Double-deck	20	1924	1954	1990s	Body only	Under restoration	Sydney Tramway Museum
Double-deck	46	1922	1954	1973	Body only	Restored	Tasmanian Transport Museum
Drop end-combination	39	1917	1947	1998	Complete	Restored	Hobart City Council
Drop end-combination	106	191	1947	1998	Body only	Static	Private owner
Single-deck Bogie Saloon	116	1941	1960	1990s	Body only	Stored	Tasmanian Transport Museum
Single-deck Bogie Saloon	118	1941	1960	1990s	Body only	Under restoration	Hobart City Council
Single-deck Bogie Saloon	120	1936	1960	2005	Body only	Under restoration	Private owner
Single-deck Bogie Saloon	126	1943	1960	N/A	Body only	Incorporated into house with 135 in Verona Sands	Private owner
Single-deck Bogie Saloon	133	1947	1960	1990s	Body only	Stored	Hobart City Council
Single-deck Bogie Saloon	135	1947	1960	N/A	Body only	Incorporated into house with 126 in Verona Sands	Private owner
Single-deck Bogie Saloon	136	1947	1960	N/A	Body only	Static	Private owner
Single-deck Bogie Saloon	139	1947	1960	N/A	Body only	Static, White Beach	Private owner
Single-deck Bogie Saloon	140	1947	1960	N/A	Body only	Static, Sisters Beach	Private owner
Single-deck Bogie Saloon	141	1952	1960	1960	Complete	Operational	Tasmanian Transport Museum

== Future ==
Most of the fleet of trams were sold off for scrap, although some were placed into storage, and the early 21st century saw a Hobart City Council proposal for the restoration of a tram service, possibly as a reduced tourism heritage service along the Hobart waterfront.

The proposal put forward by Hobart City Council for public consultation in 2003 was for a single line heritage tramway utilising the restored single deck number 39 tram, which would run from Salamanca along Sullivans Cove via Morrison Street and Mawson Place to Hunter Street. It was suggested that it would coincide with a proposal to redevelop Princes Wharf no. 2, which is a docking berth for large cruise ships. It was planned that the Sullivans Cove Tramway would utilise the original 3’6" (106.68 cm) gauge tracks. Significant opposition was encountered to this proposal from motorist groups, although few legitimate concerns were raised on their part. There was also internal opposition within the city council from Alderman John Freedman, although no public justification for this position was released. The proposal was subsequently shelved indefinitely. A 2009 proposal to loan the restored trams to the Tasmanian Museum & Art Gallery for permanent display caused further internal disputes within Hobart City Council.

In 2007, a proposal was put forward by the State Government of Paul Lennon, that a new mainline rail and transport hub could be constructed at Brighton, freeing the mainline between Brighton and Hobart rail depot. Various suggestions for the reuse of this line as a commuter rail corridor to Hobart's northern suburbs were subsequently proposed.

In 2009 a further proposal was put forward by University of Tasmania graduate and Hydro Tasmania electrical engineer Ben Johnston, and his wife Kristie Johnston. Their concept involves battery powered light rail. It would run on the existing Hobart northern suburban rail corridor that had been used purely for freight services since the closure of the Tasmanian Government Railways Hobart suburban service in 1975. Their proposal suggests stops at Hobart, New Town, Moonah, Glenorchy, Berriedale, Claremont and Granton. Their carbon neutral proposal suggested battery powered carriages which recharge while passengers board and alight at each station. The battery system eliminates the overhead wires that were heavily criticised on the old Hobart tram network. In December 2009 the Johnstons presented their proposal at Moorilla Estate to an audience that included several prominent and prospective local politicians.

== See also ==
- Rail transport in Tasmania
- Trams in Australia
- Zeehan on the west coast of Tasmania—had a tram system from 1896 to 1905
