= Fern Tree =

Fern Tree may refer to:

- Tree fern, a plant
- Fern Tree, Tasmania, an outer suburb of Hobart, Tasmania, Australia
