= Cascades, Tasmania =

Cascades
- Suburb
- Interactive map of Cascades
- Coordinates: 42°53′53″S 147°17′18″E
- Country: Australia
- State: Tasmania
- City: Hobart
- LGA: City of Hobart
- Postcode: 7004
Suburbs around Cascades
| | West Hobart | South Hobart |
| | Cascades | Dynnyrne |
| Fern Tree | Ridgeway | Tolmans Hill |

Cascades is a suburb of Hobart, Tasmania, Australia. It is immediately west of the city centre in the foothills of Mount Wellington. It is the location of the Cascade Brewery. The suburb is between South Hobart and Fern Tree; and incorporates residential areas on Strickland Avenue and Huon Road.

== Sources ==
(Google Maps)
