= Ridgeway, Tasmania =

Ridgeway
- Suburb
- Interactive map of Ridgeway
- Coordinates: 42°56′S 147°17′E
- Country: Australia
- State: Tasmania
- Region: Hobart
- City: Hobart
- LGA: City of Hobart
- Location: 7 km (4.3 mi) SW of Hobart

Government
  - State electorate: Clark
  - Federal division: Clark

Population
  - Total: 175 (2016 census)
- Postcode: 7054
Suburbs around Ridgeway
South Hobart	Cascades	Dynnyrne
Fern Tree	Ridgeway	Tolmans Hill
Neika	Kingston	Mount Nelson

Ridgeway is a suburb in Hobart, Tasmania Australia. It is 7 kilometres (4.3 mi) south-west of the Hobart central business district. The 2016 census recorded a population of 175. .

In Ridgeway there are two plant nurseries (Plants of Tasmania Nursery and Island Bonsai), and a small number of homes. Prior to the 1967 bushfires, Ridgeway was a market garden area with its own school and church. There also used to be another nursery next to Plants of Tasmania.

== History ==
Ridgeway was gazetted as a locality in 1963.

== Geography ==
Sandy Bay Rivulet forms the north-western boundary, while Dunns Creek forms part of the south-eastern.

== Road infrastructure ==
Route B64 (Huon Road) runs along the western boundary, from where Chimney Pot Hill Road provides access to the locality.
