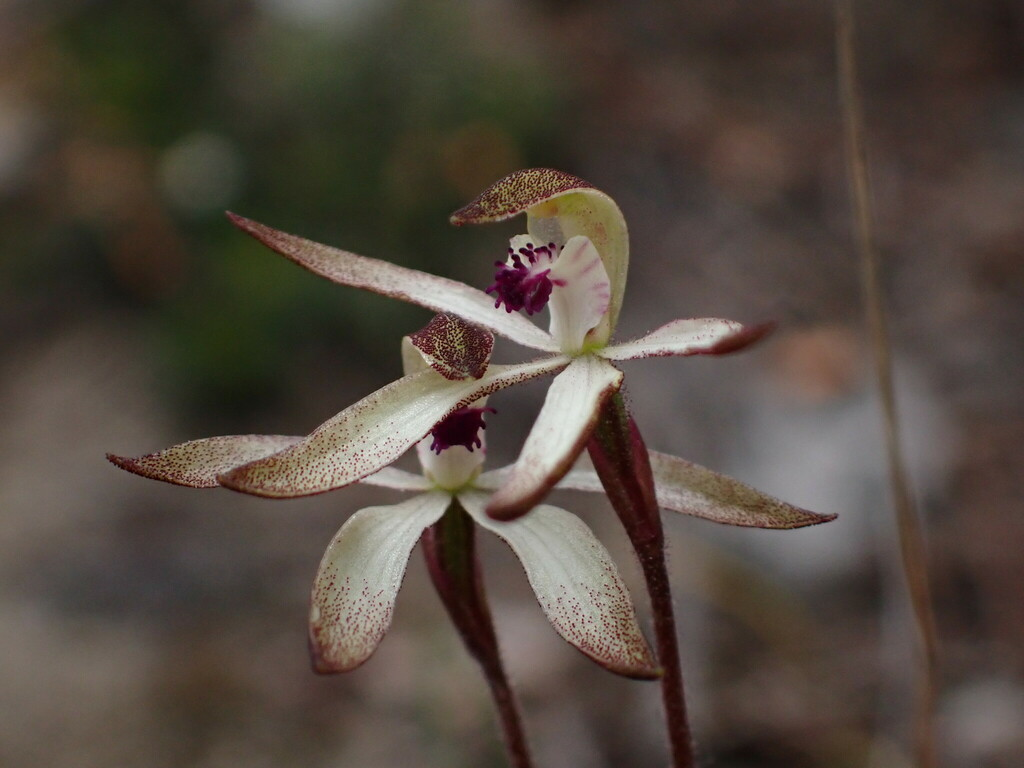
- In South Hobart

Scientific classification
- Kingdom: Plantae
- Clade: Embryophytes
- Clade: Tracheophytes
- Clade: Spermatophytes
- Clade: Angiosperms
- Clade: Monocots
- Order: Asparagales
- Family: Orchidaceae
- Subfamily: Orchidoideae
- Tribe: Diurideae
- Genus: Caladenia
- Species: C. atrata

Binomial name
- Caladenia atrata D.L.Jones

Synonyms
- Stegostyla atrata (D.L.Jones) D.L.Jones & M.A.Clem.; Caladenia cucullata auct. non Fitzg.: Curtis, W.M. (1980); Caladenia testacea auct. non R.Br.: Rodway, L. (1903)

= Caladenia atrata =

Dark caladenia

Species of orchid

Caladenia atrata, commonly known as dark caladenia is a plant in the orchid family Orchidaceae and is endemic to Tasmania. It is a ground orchid with flowers that are bright white on the front, but densely covered with black glands on the back.

== Description ==
Caladenia atrata is a terrestrial, perennial, deciduous, herb which usually grows in loose groups. It has an underground tuber and a single, sparsely hairy, linear, dark green leaf, 6–13 cm (2–5 in) long and about 3 mm (0.1 in) wide.

Up to four flowers 18 mm (0.7 in) in diameter are borne on a thin, hairy, wiry spike 12–20 cm (5–8 in) high. The petals and sepals are bright white on the front and densely covered with black glands on the back. The dorsal sepal is 10–12 mm (0.4–0.5 in) long, 2–3 mm (0.08–0.1 in) wide and curves forward forming a hood over the column. The petals and lateral sepals are asymmetrically linear to lance-shaped,10–14 mm (0.4–0.6 in) long and about 2 mm (0.08 in) wide. The labellum is 4.5–6 mm (0.18–0.24 in) long and about 4 mm (0.2 in) wide. It is white to pinkish with purple spots and a purple tip, and egg-shaped when flattened. It has three lobes and curves forward, the lateral lobes erect, surrounding the column. There are blunt teeth on the edge of the labellum and three or four rows of stalked, purplish calli along its mid-line. The column is about 6 mm (0.2 in) long and greenish with red blotches. Flowering occurs from late October to December.

== Taxonomy and naming ==
Caladenia atrata was first formally described by David Jones in 1994 and the description was published in Muelleria. The type specimen was collected on a hill in the south-eastern suburbs of Hobart. The specific epithet (atrata) is a Latin word meaning "dressed in black" referring to the black on the outside of the flower.

== Distribution and habitat ==
Dark caladenia is only known from southern areas of Tasmania where it grows on skeletal soils in stunted forest on hillsides.
