= Raymond Donoghue =

Australian tram driver (1920–1960)

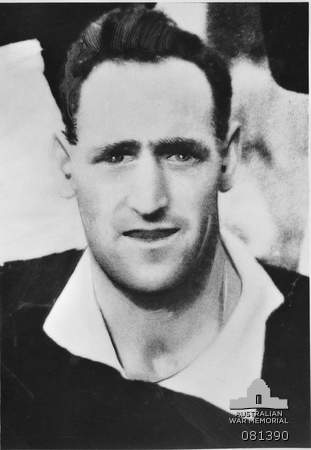
Raymond Donoghue

Raymond Tasman Donoghue GC (10 December 1920 – 29 April 1960) was an Australian tram driver posthumously awarded the George Cross for the gallantry he displayed in Hobart, Tasmania.

His date of birth is recorded as December 1920, however several of his service history documents have this recorded as December 1919. He may have lied about his age to enlist.

== Military service ==
On 5 January 1940, Donoghue was living in Battery Point, Hobart, when he signed up to deploy overseas. He was initially posted to 6 Garrison Battalion in Hobart but on 14 March 1940 he enlisted in the Australian Imperial Forces (AIF) and became TX1087 Private Raymond Tasman Donoghue, posted to 2/12 Australian Infantry Battalion. He was sent on pre-embarkation leave almost immediately, and on 4 May 1940, he sailed to Scotland.

After spending six months in Scotland, Donoghue deployed to the Middle East with 2/32 Australian Infantry Battalion. He spent a few short weeks undergoing further training before deploying to Greece on 25 March 1941. Details are vague, but it seems Donoghue was captured by the Germans on 28 April 1941 and reported missing in action (MIA) on 8 June 1941. In August of the same year he was reported as a prisoner of war (POW), being held in Stalag 18A, where he remained until 10 June 1945, being employed as a pick and shovel labourer until he was recovered and taken to the United Kingdom.

Two days after being released, Donoghue completed a report of his treatment as a POW. He stated that he was captured along with a colleague, TX631 PTE Leonard Leo Charles Bevis, who also enlisted at Battery Point. His comments on the living conditions state: "Living conditions very poor. Straw sacks, lighting fair, heating bad, over crowded, vermin". There are other comments, however they are illegible.

Donoghue states that the rationing was "very insufficient food, bad quality and facilities". This would have been the main contributing factor to the dysentery Donoghue suffered from 15 May until 4 August 1941. He also suffered bad eyesight and received treatment from March 1942 until after being released. He stated that he received medical treatment "...from our own British Medical Officer and also a German Medical Officer." and reported that "...the medical treatment was very good."

While it seems that Donoghue and his fellow POWs were not mistreated, their washing and sanitary facilities were very poor which would have contributed to his ailing health. Donoghue's report states that they were permitted to play "plenty of sport", but he stated that they received recreation facilities "only from International Red Cross and from home".

One of the questions included on the POW report is "List names of any other Australians seen while you were a prisoner of war". To that, Donoghue replied "I have seen many Australians during captivity but names I could not state".

On 25 July 1945, Donoghue set sail back to Australia. He arrived in Sydney on 7 August 1945 where he spent about six weeks convalescing before being discharged back in Tasmania on 7 November 1945. For his military service, Donoghue was awarded the 1939-1945 Star, Defence Medal, War Medal and Australia Service Medal.

Donoghue also became one of only 23 Australians to be awarded the George Cross. It is the highest Commonwealth award for bravery available to civilians. Military personnel may also receive the George Cross, but only if their act cannot be recognised by the military system. In George Cross Park in Canberra, there is a memorial which contains a plaque for each recipient, outlining the actions and events resulting in each award.

== Death ==
On 29 April 1960, Donoghue was the conductor of a tram, which collided with a truck, injuring the driver and damaging the brakes, during rush hour. The tram began to roll down Elizabeth Street, reaching speeds of up to 50 miles per hour (80 km/h). Donoghue, helped by passengers, struggled to apply the brakes in the damaged cab then moved the passengers to the rear of the tram to protect them. He stayed in the cab, ringing the bell to warn traffic and attempting to apply the handbrake, until the tram struck another tram, killing Donoghue. Forty-seven passengers were injured, four seriously, but due to Donoghue's actions, none were killed. The coroner's report noted his "great fortitude in the face of imminent danger ... doing all in his power to save the lives of numerous passengers".

The award of the George Cross was gazetted on 11 October 1960. Raymond Donoghue is buried in Cornelian Bay Cemetery.
