= Trolleybuses in Launceston, Tasmania =

Launceston trolleybus system

Operation
- Locale: Launceston, Tasmania, Australia
- Open: 24 December 1951
- Close: 26 July 1968
- Status: Closed
- Operators: Launceston City Council; Metropolitan Transport Trust

Statistics
- Route length: 24 km (15 mi)

The Launceston trolleybus system operated in Launceston, Tasmania, Australia from 1951 until 1968.

== History ==
After a protracted conversion with multiple delays in delivery of buses and other infrastructure, the Launceston trolleybus system opened on 24 December 1951 from the Launceston city centre to Quarantine Road via Wellington Street replacing a tram service. A second line opened to Mowbray Heights on 13 September 1952, being extended to Newnham Park on 21 November 1952. On 1 July 1955, operation of the network passed from the Launceston City Council to the Metropolitan Transport Trust.

Further lines opened to Basin Road and Quarantine Road via Talbot Road, both on 24 February 1957 to form a cross-city service, followed by Norwood on 27 November 1961. The network closed in stages in 1968.

== Services ==
Launceston's trolleybus routes were as follows:

Route	Extension	Opened	Closed
Launceston - Quarantine Road via Wellington Street		24 December 1951	26 July 1968
Launceston - Mowbray Heights		13 September 1952	26 July 1968
	Mowbray Heights - Newnham Park	21 November 1952	26 July 1968
Launceston - Basin Road		24 February 1957	15 July 1968
Launceston - Quarantine Road via Talbot Road		24 February 1957	13 July 1968
Launceston - Norwood		27 November 1961	28 June 1968

== Fleet ==
The fleet comprised 30 BUT RETB/1s. These were bodied in Adelaide by JA Lawnton & Sons, each being trialled on the Adelaide network before being sent to Launceston. In 1964, five were sold for further use on the Hobart system.

== Depot ==
The Howick Street tram depot was doubled in size to accommodate the trolleybus fleet.
