= Mount Stuart, Tasmania =

Mount Stuart
- Suburb
- Interactive map of Mount Stuart
- Coordinates: 42°52′23″S 147°18′8″E
- Country: Australia
- State: Tasmania
- City: Hobart
- LGA: City of Hobart

Government
  - State electorate: Clark
  - Federal division: Clark

Population
  - Total: 2,399 (2016 census)
- Postcode: 7000
Suburbs around Mount Stuart
Lenah Valley	New Town	New Town
	Mount Stuart	North Hobart
	West Hobart	West Hobart

Mount Stuart is a suburb of Hobart that lies on a ridge that extends from a foothill of Mount Wellington, known as Knocklofty.

== History ==
The original owners of the land, upon which Mount Stuart is built, were known as Mouheneenner band of the South East tribe of Aboriginal Tasmanians. Ownership of the land began to change after British occupation of the land began in 1803.

=== Etymology ===
The name Mount Stuart comes indirectly from a Governor of Bombay in India, Mountstuart Elphinstone. Mountstuart was the fourth son of the eleventh Lord Elphinstone, and was born in Dunbartonshire, Scotland. A ship, the Mountstuart Elphinstone, was named in honour of the Governor, and in 1836, this ship visited Hobart town. The Mountstuart Elphinstone brought the news that the unpopular Lieutenant-Governor George Arthur, was ordered to return to London. This allowed reversal of some of his unpopular Laws. To celebrate, locals named two roads to the north west of the town 'Mount Stuart Road' and 'Elphinstone Road'.

Over time the area around Mount Stuart Road became known as 'Mount Stuart'. After a while an area outside 'Hobart Town' (including much of West Hobart) was designated 'Mount Stuart Town'. Knocklofty (hill) was also known as Mount Stuart or Paraclete. Mount Stuart Town was absorbed into Hobart around 1908. Mount Stuart also uses the general Hobart postcode of 7000. West Hobart gradually developed as a separate suburb, and the hill of Knocklofty progressively became a reserve. Next to the Knocklofty Reserve is a water reservoir, near which walkers can take in views of Hobart.

== Demography ==
Mount Stuart is a predominantly residential suburb located at the end of Elphinstone Road.

== Education ==
The main school in the suburb is Mount Stuart Primary School, which opened in 1957. The site had previously been part of the Paraclete Estate.

The Kindergarten on Raymont Terrace has moved and currently Mount Stuart Presbyterian Church rents the building, using it for their Kids Church and morning tea after the church service.

== Facilities ==
The Mount Stuart Community Hall is a feature of the suburb, on land owned by the Hobart City Council and is managed by the Mount Stuart Community Association. The Mount Stuart Scout Group have met at this hall since 1959. A dance school is also run from the Hall.

There is a local park with barbecues at the end of Benjafield Terrace, beneath the Mount Stuart Lookout, which has views of the city, Mount Dromedary, and the northern suburbs. The playground features a mock rock-climbing wall.

== Notable people ==
- Carolyn Frohmader, multiply recognised human rights campaigner for women and girls with disabilities
