= Carolyn Frohmader =

Carolyn Patricia Frohmader AO (born 18 February 1965) is an Australian human rights campaigner for women and girls with disabilities, and the long-serving Executive Director of Women with Disabilities Australia (WWDA).

== Biography ==
Born in Mount Stuart, Tasmania, Carolyn Frohmader received her bachelor's degree from University of Tasmania, and her master's degree from Flinders University, where she won the Michael Crotty Award for an outstanding contribution in Primary Health Care. Since 1997, Frohmader has been chief executive officer of Women With Disabilities Australia (WWDA). Under her leadership, WWDA received a number of awards, including the National Violence Prevention Award (1999), National Human Rights Award (2001), and the Tasmanian Women's Safety Award (2008). Frohmader has become one of the leading disability rights advocates in Australia, and largely due to her work, WWDA has developed into a nationally and internationally recognised leader in the international disabled women's rights movement. Carolyn wrote her book "In Our Words" to answer the needs of women in South-East Tasmania.It was then that in 1997 she became she became executive director of WWDA.

== Awards ==
- ACT Women's Honour Roll (2001)
- Tasmanian Women's Honour Roll (2009)
- Nominee for Australian of the Year Awards Tasmania (2010)
- National Human Rights Award – Individual (2013)
- Officer of the Order of Australia (2026) for "distinguished service to people with disability, particularly women and girls, and to social welfare policy development and law reform"

== See also ==
- Women With Disabilities Australia
