= North Hobart Post Office =

Post office in Tasmania, Australia

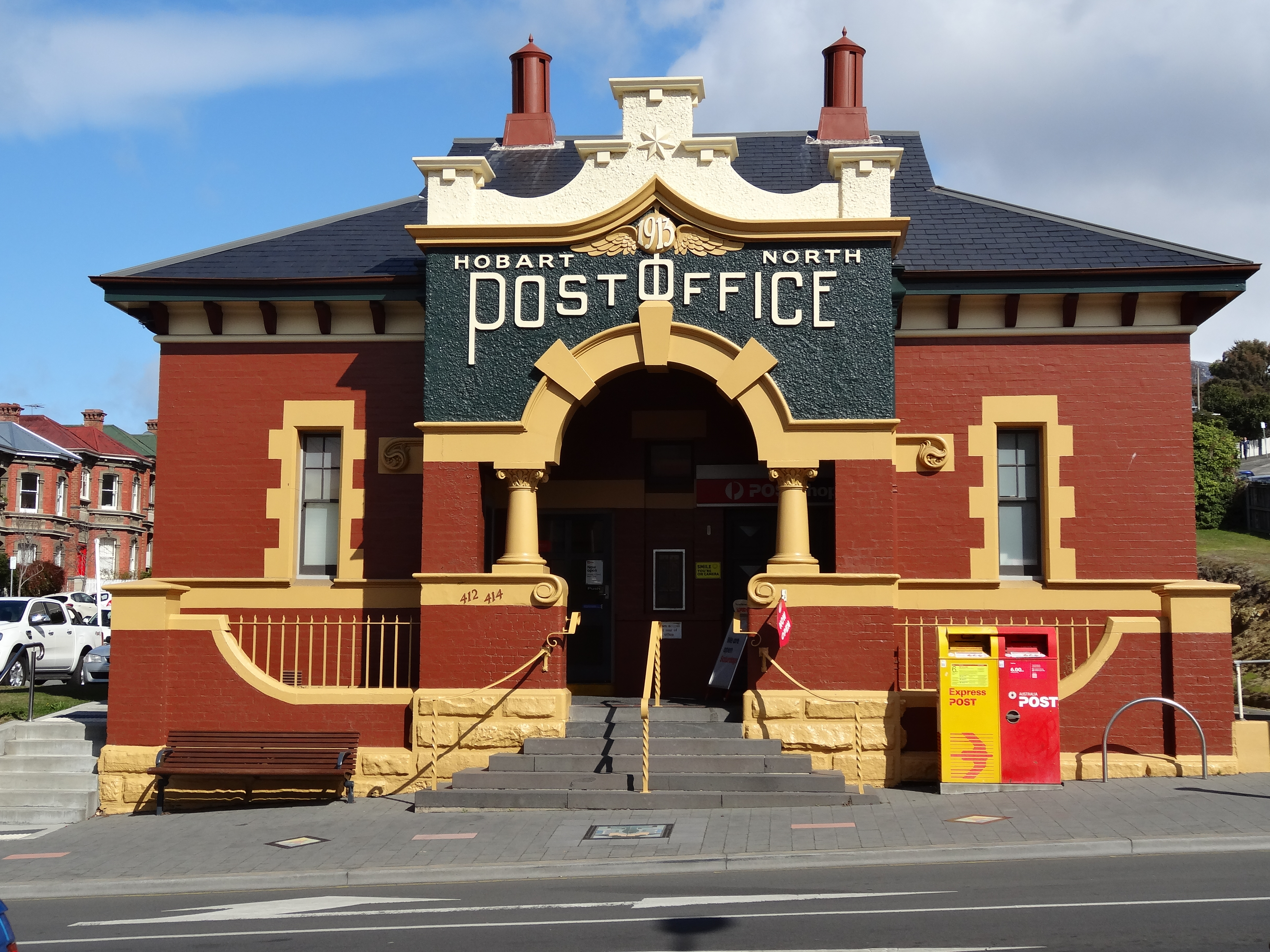

- Location within Hobart
- 42.8723°S 147.3142°E
- Location: 412–414 Elizabeth Street, North Hobart, Tasmania, Australia

Commonwealth Heritage List
- Official name: North Hobart Post Office
- Type: Listed place (Historic)
- Designated: 8 November 2011
- Reference no.: 105538

Tasmanian Heritage Register
- Place ID: 137
- Status: Permanently Registered

North Hobart Post Office is a heritage-listed post office at 412–414 Elizabeth Street, North Hobart, Tasmania, Australia. It was added to the Australian Commonwealth Heritage List on 8 November 2011.

== History ==
Located at the intersection of Swan and Elizabeth Streets, North Hobart Post Office is in close proximity to the suburb's historic centre. The Providence Rivulet once flowed through the area characterised by small farms, hopfields, orchards and market gardens. From the 1820s, this sector of Elizabeth Street, extending east to Bennett Street, comprised the earliest elements that marked the boundary of suburban allotments from Old Hobart Town. The allotments ranged up to ten acres (4.0 hectares) and were originally taken up as small acreages requiring the purchase to fulfil certain conditions: recipients were required to clear the land, erect a fence within twelve months, and build a brick or stone house within five years. Although some large allotments survived into the twentieth century, subdivision began in the 1830s and the original "suburban" allotments were soon criss-crossed by new streets. Pitt, Newdegate and Swan streets were all created in the second half of the 19th century. The suburb's earliest enterprises include the clock tower (1850–1912), Ring's Yard (1846–1870), Condell's Brewery (1830) and the weighbridge (1850).

North Hobart Post Office was built on part of a seven-acre (nearly 3 hectares) allotment originally granted to John Swan, who was considered by many of colonial Hobart's social elite to be a man with a shady past – he had been acquitted of "receiving" at the Old Bailey in London. By the late 1820s, Swan had a successful haberdashery business and his family acquired several properties in North Hobart including this allotment. By the 1840s a cottage and extensive garden had been built, but by the 1890s, the allotment was subdivided and Swan Street created. In 1903, the Commonwealth acquired the site for the new post office.

Surveyed in 1912 and built in 1913, the North Hobart Post Office was constructed to a design by the Commonwealth Department of Home Affairs under the aegis of architect, John Smith Murdoch although Warmington cites the state Department of Works' Office. The scope of this citation has precluded further research to clarify architectural attribution. An early (undated) postcard of the building depicts it as freestanding on a large corner site, flanked either side by picturesque picket fencing and landscaped areas.

A telephone box was located at the side of the entry portico c. 1950. The exterior building face was repainted in a light colour by 1987. The paint scheme was then altered with liver red walls and contrasting mustard overpainting of the freestone details and trim with light cream eavesline and gables c. 2004.

== Description ==
North Hobart Post Office is at 412–414 Elizabeth Street, corners Swan Street and Elphinstone Road, North Hobart, comprising the whole of LPI 1 233925.

A very fine one-storey Edwardian post office building of brick and stucco with panel of rough cast over entrance. The roof is slate, and a hipped gable with large ridge vents. The building has a central entrance with steps, of faintly Romanesque styling, small side windows, and rusticated stone foundation.

North Hobart Post Office is centrally located on a square site bound by Elizabeth and Swan Streets with Elphinstone Road. The site drops significantly away to the northeast corner and has been cut to form a steep L-shaped embankment along the south and west site boundaries and a flat asphalted area for carparking. A small redbrick toilet block is located in the southwest corner of the site. Photographic records indicate that for a long time the site had an Art-Nouveau patterned timber fence around the site but by 1987 it had been replaced by a low rendered retaining wall with a steel pipe top rail.

The main building frontage addresses Elizabeth Street to the east with the entry steps splayed either side of an arched opening flanked by two brick piers and a "scooped" brickwork wall. The building sits on rough-cut rusticated stone base with brick entry piers and walling above that. The entry piers are smooth rendered to the street with exposed brick reveals. A plate stone courseline runs around the building, topped by a continuous drip moulding. Above this, on the entrance side, is compressed entry arch with three accentuated voussoirs and a plain architrave supported on two ionic colonnettes. It has a curved drip moulding that repeats the lower course line profile and returns to the side front walls, terminating in the form of a coil. Two narrow windows are placed on either side of the entry porch, framed with smooth-dressed stone quoining. The panel above the arch contains the words "POST OFFICE" in flexed lettering and that is framed with a moulded cornice that turns upward to a point at the centre in two curved sections. Above that is a set of five stuccoed piers, all square in plan, with single-course brick mortarboard toppings, bracketed by a single brick on each side.

This is juxtaposed against the roof, a symmetrical structure with slates and hipped gables at the north and south ends, each with a vented half-timbered gablet and textured stucco spandrels. The lantern vents are unusual in detail, having two plinths with battered sides and inward-tapering corners, and vent-cylinders with concave-pointed tops and faceted sides. The eaves are boxed with a regularly spaced set of quadrant brackets over a frieze in textured stucco. The sidewalls, like the front, were originally exposed red face brickwork with a single flat plate course and drip-moulding running across each at floor level. The north has a central paired window with segmental arch triple-light fan and paired double-hung sash below. The lower panes of each window are clear-glazed with the upper panel subdivided by six-pane lights. This form is repeated in two flanking sashes, though these are flat-headed and have no fan. All three are quoined with dressed stone (now overpainted), and the centre window arch has an accentuated central keystone and ear mouldings at either end.

In plan form, the post office consists of a series of rooms or spaces arranged into the following functions. The post office component comprises the entry portico, post boxes and public retail area, which has since been reconfigured and enlarged, flanked at the rear by an L-shaped mail sorting room. Beyond this, the area formerly used as a residence, has been refurbished for staff usage including a toilet area, store and a lunchroom. The side entry vestibule, now a store, and strong room adjacent, is intact, with entries to the former residence (west) and post office (east). Subsequent additions to the southwest corner of the building comprise a post office box corridor, with a covered ramp leading up to the mailroom counter window. The carpark is located directly to the south.

=== Condition and integrity ===
Typologically, the original design for the North Hobart Post Office combined a postmaster's residence with a public entry, postal hall and sorting room. Externally, the building's ability to demonstrate the original architectural conception, materials and detail is very good. Exceptions include the overpainted brick and stonework, the addition of the glazed post office box lobby on the southwest corner and minor alterations to windows and doors at the rear of the building. The roof also has a high degree of integrity with regard to its hipped gabled form, ridge vents, and chimney placements, but is in poor condition (see further comments below). The current high contrast "heritage" paint scheme, however, is considered to have impacted on the building's original presentation as a facebrick and dressed stone structure, and arguably masks its aesthetic accomplishment.

Internally, as commented above, the plan form of the building although altered, demonstrates the original key aspects relating to the postal hall and postmaster's residence. The cumulative effect of the reorientation and enlargement of the public space, however, in addition to the refurbishment of the rear residence for staff use, has diminished the legibility of the original usage but to a lesser degree, the fabric and finishes. For instance, the basic planning of the residence and postal functions is legible in the existing building entry, postal hall, side residential entry and strong room which also retain much of their original detail and decorative richness. This includes the presentation of windows and doors, fireplaces, pressed metal ceilings, cornices, ceiling roses and decorative wall vents.

The post office appears to be in a relatively sound condition with the exception of the slates and flashings which are in poor condition, particularly over the northwest rear section of the building. The roof space and sub-floor areas were not inspected.

== Heritage listing ==
The 1913 post office is located in the vicinity of the historic commercial centre of North Hobart which comprises the earliest elements that mark the boundary of suburban allotments from Old Hobart Town. The post office has been an important element of this area for nearly 100 years, after the new Commonwealth Government acquired the current site in 1903. This aspect of the property's history and historical associations are of some significance.

Typologically, North Hobart Post Office built in 1913, is an example of a second generation of post office which combines a postal hall and postmaster's residence. Subsequently, the latter function has been removed although the functional relationship between the former components is evident in plan form, fabric and finish. As an example of a freestanding post office of this generation, the building has a high degree of internal and external intactness, with regard to form and fabric. Recent additions to the southwest corner include a ramp and post office box lobby, consistent with the changing requirements of postal operations, and have had limited impact on the building's front and side presentation.

Architecturally and aesthetically, North Hobart Post Office is a successfully composed design for an urban site which is viewed in the round. While domestic in proportion and incorporating a hipped gabled roof form, the building simultaneously manages to assert an expressive presence around its projecting parapeted entry arch and porch. The Federation-era fusion of domestic and monumental "street" elements is also evident in the heavy rusticated stone base and dressings, the parapeted entry porch, eaves bracketing and window treatments; these elements remain forceful and expressive, despite the overpainting in high contrast of the entire exterior.

Stylistically, the design is highly unusual and idiosyncratic, particularly in the context of institutional design, in its stylised incorporation of Edwardian Baroque flourish, evident in the turned entry porch columns, moulded scrolls, modelled parapet, exaggerated voussoirs, building inscription and "scalloped" front fence.

North Hobart Post Office is prominently located at a busy street corner, with a high level of visibility in its local context and an assured civic presence in a busy streetscape, despite its domestic scale. It is also a highly recognisable Federation building within North Hobart, with its exuberant detailing.

North Hobart Post Office is of social significance due to the amenity of the postal services which have operated from the building for around 95 years.

The curtilage includes the title block/allotment of the property.

The significant components of North Hobart Post Office include the main postal building of 1913 and its presentation in the round.
