= Tolmans Hill =

- Suburb
- Interactive map of Tolmans Hill
- Coordinates: 42°54′52″S 147°18′30″E
- Country: Australia
- State: Tasmania
- City: Hobart
- LGA: City of Hobart

Government
  - State electorate: Clark
  - Federal division: Clark

Population
  - Total: 647 (2021 census)
- Postcode: 7007
Suburbs around Tolmans Hill
Cascades	Dynnyrne	Sandy Bay
Ridgeway	Tolmans Hill	Sandy Bay
Ridgeway		Mount Nelson

Tolmans Hill is a suburb of Hobart, Tasmania, Australia. It is likely to be the last large scale greenfield suburban development to take place within Hobart city. At the 2021 Australian Census the suburb recorded a population of 647.

The suburb is named after John Gibbs Tolman, a Hobart businessman, who purchased the whole area for just £650 in 1889.

Tolmans Hill was used for grazing up to the 1980s. In 1991, Hobart City Council approved a subdivision to 415 lots, which acknowledged the need to preserve its bushland character.

There was much controversy when the Tolmans Hill development was first announced as planning permits were not widely made available to the public. The development involved the removal of most of the non-native vegetation, such as Gorse and Cotoneaster whilst trying to retain as much as possible of the endemic vegetation that covered Tolmans Hill. This was a difficult task given during the early years of Hobart Town the hill was deforested on a regular basis. Then in later years large deliberately lit fires occurred every two to three years. The developers created the Tolmans Hill Local Area Plan as part of its original application to the Hobart City Council. Many restrictions have been placed on land owners regarding re-vegetation, site disturbance, and visual impact. One condition contained in the stringent Tolmans Hill plan is that in certain parts of the suburb, trees cannot be removed without an amendment to the development permit. This requires an application to the council and a payment for an arborist's report.

As of May 2025, Tolmans Hill consists of 8 roads. Old Proctors Rd, Hakea Dr, Woodcutters Rd, Pulchella Dr, Correa Pl, Hillcrest Rd, Woodridge Pl, and Bursaria Ct.
