= Glebe, Tasmania =

Glebe
- Suburb
- Interactive map of Glebe
- Coordinates: 42°52′26″S 147°19′35″E
- Country: Australia
- State: Tasmania
- City: Hobart
- LGA: City of Hobart

Government
  - State electorate: Clark
  - Federal division: Clark

Population
  - Total: 554 (2016 census)
- Postcode: 7000
Suburbs around Glebe
North Hobart	Domain	Domain
North Hobart	Glebe	Domain
Hobart	Hobart	Hobart

Glebe is a suburb in Hobart, Tasmania, Australia. The suburb is a very small area adjacent to the city on the same part of land as the Queens Domain, the Royal Tasmanian Botanical Gardens and the Hobart Aquatic Centre. At the 2016 Australian Census the suburb recorded a population of 554.

Glebe is a small suburb in comparison to some in Hobart. On the north and east sides, the suburb is surrounded by the Royal Tasmanian Botanical Gardens. Brooker Avenue marks the western boundary of the suburb, while the Tasman Highway marks the southern side.

The Glebe contains some examples of Victorian and Federation Style wooden terraced houses, some of which are up to four storeys high.

Glebe was the birthplace and early home of brothers Ernest, Tasman and Arthur Higgins, all of whom became pioneering cinematographers of Australian cinema during the silent era.

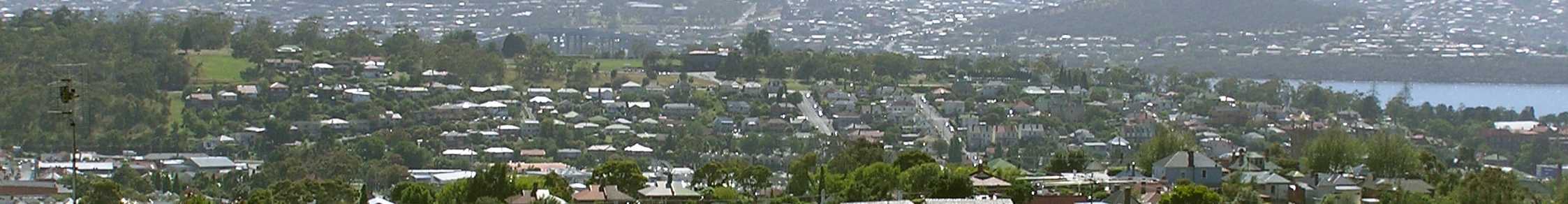
view of Glebe from West Hobart
