= North Hobart =

- Suburb
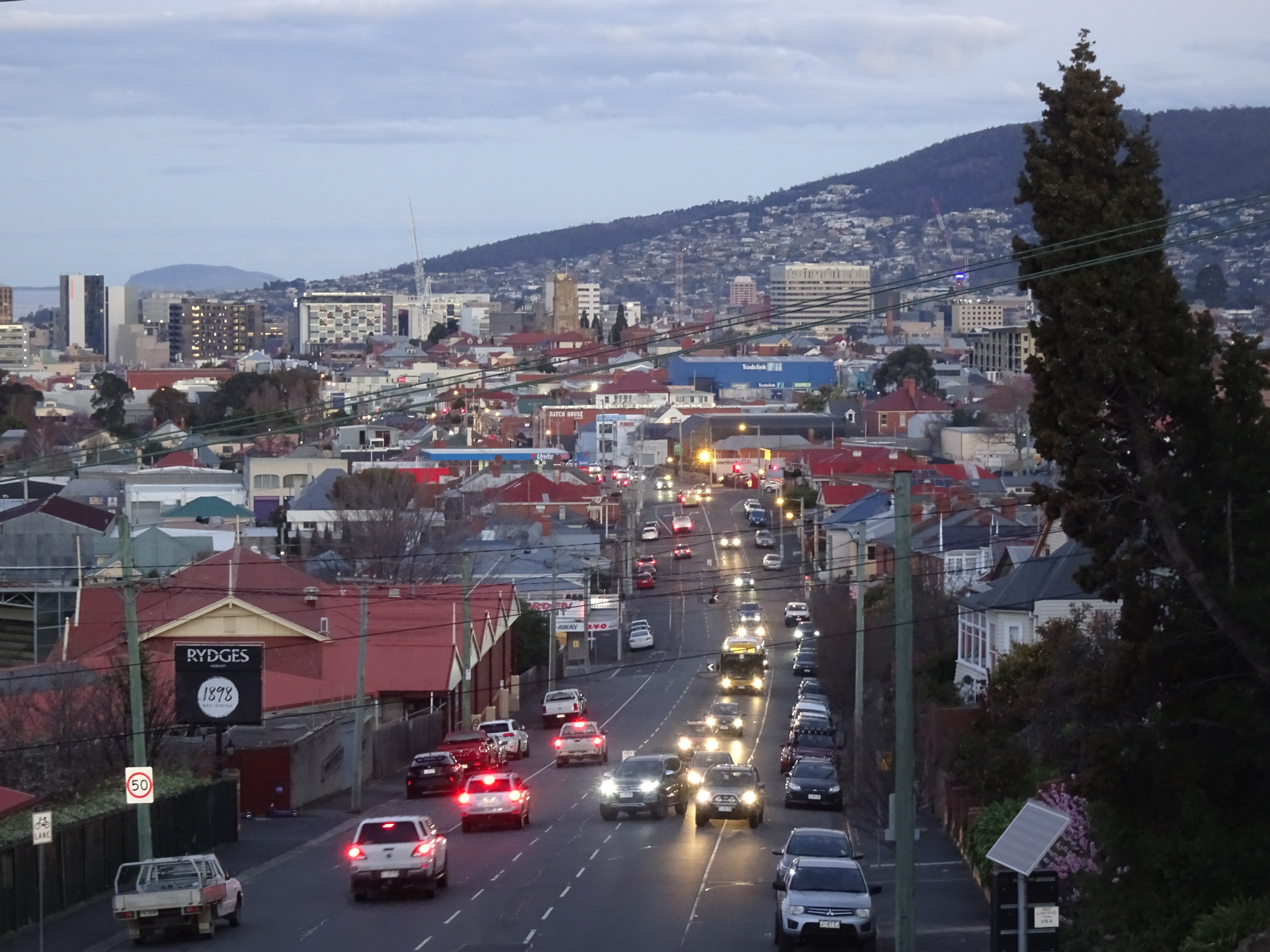
- North Hobart from Argyle Street in 2023

- Interactive map of North Hobart
- Coordinates: 42°52′20″S 147°18′52″E
- Country: Australia
- State: Tasmania
- City: Hobart
- LGA: City of Hobart

Government
  - State electorate: Clark
  - Federal division: Clark

Population
  - Total: 2,600 (2021 census)
- Postcode: 7000
Suburbs around North Hobart
| Lenah Valley | New Town | Queens Domain |
| Mount Stuart | North Hobart | Glebe |
| West Hobart | West Hobart | Hobart CBD |

North Hobart is a suburb of the city of Hobart, Tasmania, Australia. It lies directly north of the Hobart central business district.

The main street of North Hobart is Elizabeth Street, which extends northward from the Elizabeth Street Mall in the city, through North Hobart, and then becomes the Main Road in New Town and continues through many suburbs to Glenorchy and beyond.

== Amenities ==
Two colleges are located in the area - Elizabeth College, one of Hobart's four public secondary colleges, and The Friends' School, a private school for years K-12. North Hobart was also home of the former Hobart High School from 1918 to 1984 - one of the first schools in the city. The building has been preserved and used by many educational establishments over the years, and is now a Millingtons funeral home.

Other places in North Hobart include:

- North Hobart Post Office, which still exists in its original form.
- North Hobart Oval, one of the larger sports grounds in Hobart. It is the site of the Brickfields Hiring Depot during the mid-1800s, and is now predominantly used for Australian rules football matches. The suburb is represented by the North Hobart Football Club in the Tasmanian State League.
- State Cinema, Tasmania's largest independent cinema, generally shows independent and underground films.

== Restaurant strip ==
Elizabeth Street between Tasma and Federal Streets contains many of the restaurants and cafes for which North Hobart is known. The area could be compared with Lygon Street in Melbourne, except on a much smaller scale.

Restaurants in the area include two Italian restaurants and two fish bars. Asian food dominates the strip with Indian, Thai, Japanese and Chinese food, all being popular. Other restaurants serve Mexican and Turkish food. Several chain restaurants are located here as well.

== Redevelopment ==
In 2004 the area was redeveloped, including footpath widening and lining Elizabeth Street with trees. Alderman Zucco unsuccessfully proposed that the area be lined with olive trees to promote the multiculturalism that exists in the area.

== Transport ==
North Hobart is served by Metro Tasmania bus route 540 from Hobart Bus Mall to Mount Stuart.
