= West Hobart =

- Suburb
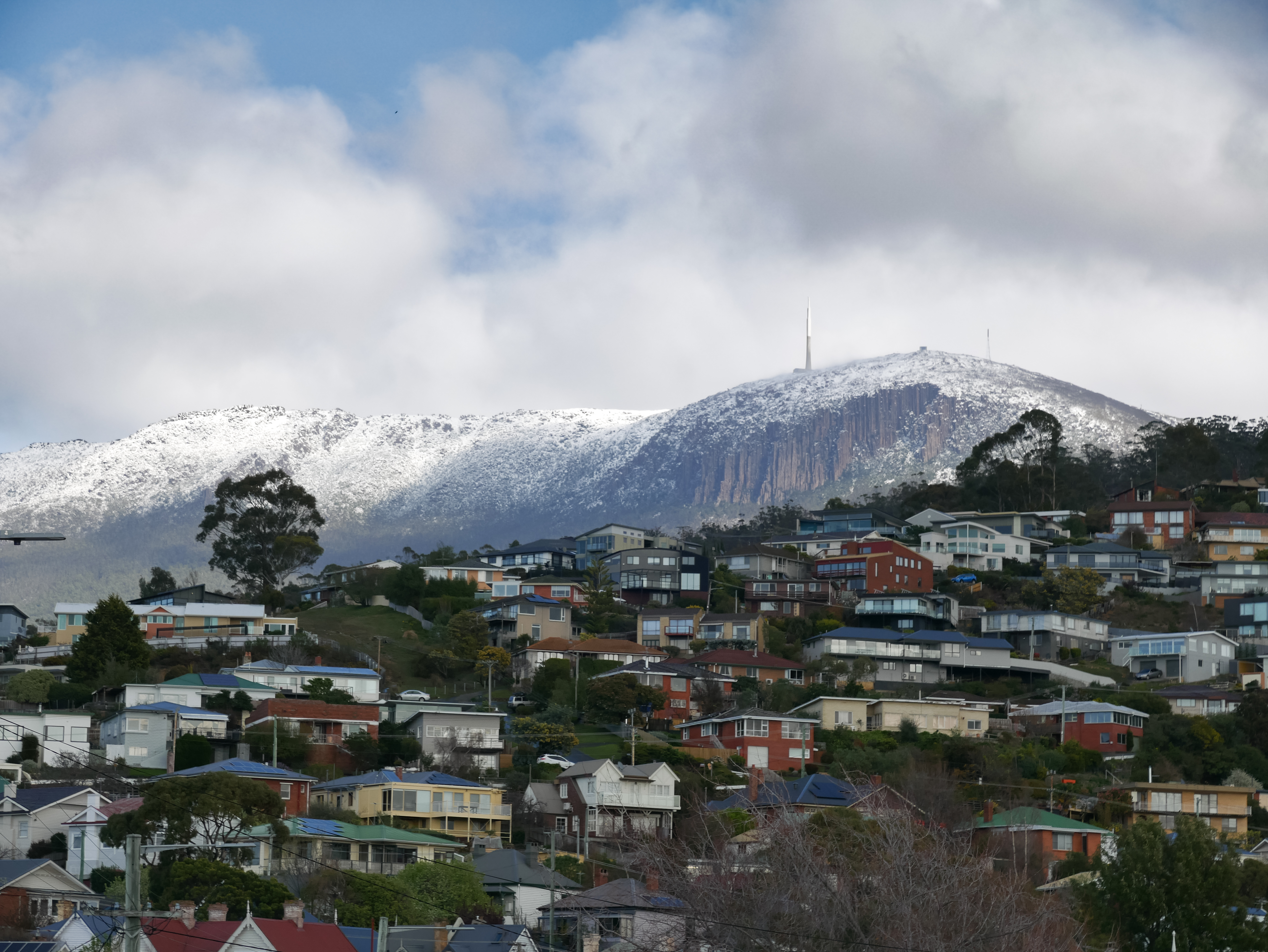
- West Hobart with Mount Wellington in the background

- Interactive map of West Hobart
- Coordinates: 42°53′1″S 147°18′54″E
- Country: Australia
- State: Tasmania
- City: Hobart
- LGA: City of Hobart

Government
  - State electorate: Clark
  - Federal division: Clark

Population
  - Total: 6,397 (2021 census)
- Postcode: 7000
Suburbs around West Hobart
Mount Stuart	North Hobart	Glebe
	West Hobart	Hobart CBD
	South Hobart	Sandy Bay

West Hobart is an inner-city suburb of Hobart, Tasmania, Australia. It is in the hills immediately west of the Hobart central business district.

== History ==
The area was first settled as a farming district, hosting poultry, dairy, hops, orchards and Chinese market gardens. Various industries have also served in the area, including a brickworks at the top of Arthur Street and coal mines below Summerhill Road. The side of Knocklofty Hill served as a sandstone quarry. Knocklofty is now a reserve maintained by the Hobart City Council. The area around Goulburn and Harrington Streets was once a red-light district.

Hobart West Post Office opened on 12 July 1892.

Considered a 'working-class' suburb until the 1960s, West Hobart has become increasingly a popular inner-city suburb. Many of the houses in the area are older Federation era buildings, prized for their views of the River Derwent.

== Today ==
West Hobart is now considered a bohemian suburb of Hobart, with many artists and musicians living in gentrified Victorian and Federation houses, which abound in the suburb.

Schools in the area include Lansdowne Crescent Primary School, Goulburn Street Primary and the Hobart campus of Guilford Young College on Barrack Street.

== Transport ==
West Hobart is served by Metro Tasmania bus route 540 from Hobart Bus Mall to Mount Stuart.
