= Fern Tree, Tasmania =

Fern Tree
- Suburb
- Interactive map of Fern Tree
- Coordinates: 42°55′27″S 147°15′40″E
- Country: Australia
- State: Tasmania
- Region: Hobart
- City: Hobart
- LGA: City of Hobart, Kingborough Council
- Location: 9 km (5.6 mi) SW of Hobart

Government
  - State electorate: Clark
  - Federal division: Clark

Area
  - Total: 7.9 km^{2} (3.1 sq mi)

Population
  - Total: 763 (2021 census)
  - Density: 84.3/km^{2} (218/sq mi)
- Postcode: 7054
Suburbs around Fern Tree
Wellington Park	Wellington Park	South Hobart
Wellington Park	Fern Tree	Ridgeway
Neika	Kingston	Kingston

Fern Tree is a rural / residential locality in Hobart, Tasmania, Australia. The locality is about 9 kilometres (5.6 mi) south-west of the Hobart central business district. The 2021 census recorded a population of 763 for the state suburb of Fern Tree.

It is an outlying suburb of Hobart. The name Fern Tree is adapted from the common name of the plant Dicksonia antarctica (Tasmanian tree fern), which grows abundantly in the area. Set beneath Mount Wellington, whose summit is at 1270 metres above sea level.

== History ==
Fern Tree was gazetted as a locality in 1963.

It was originally a postal station on the road to the Huon Valley, and later the site through which Hobart's water supply passed. Settled from the mid 19th century, Fern Tree and its environs have always been a major recreational area for Hobart residents. Its many walking tracks (most notably the Pipeline Track) see tourists and locals alike appreciating the diverse flora and fauna.

The first Fern Tree Tavern was built in 1861 by John Hall. It was soon replaced by the Fern Tree Hotel, which was established by Alfred Totenhöfer, a Collinsvale farmer of East Prussian descent. Totenhöfer's hotel burnt down in the 1967 bushfires but was subsequently rebuilt as the modern Fern Tree Tavern.

== Geography ==
Browns River forms part of the south-western boundary, while its tributaries Long Creek and Dunns Creek form parts of the south-western and north-eastern boundaries respectively.

== Road infrastructure ==
Route B64 (Huon Road) runs through from north to south-west.
