= Dynnyrne =

- Suburb
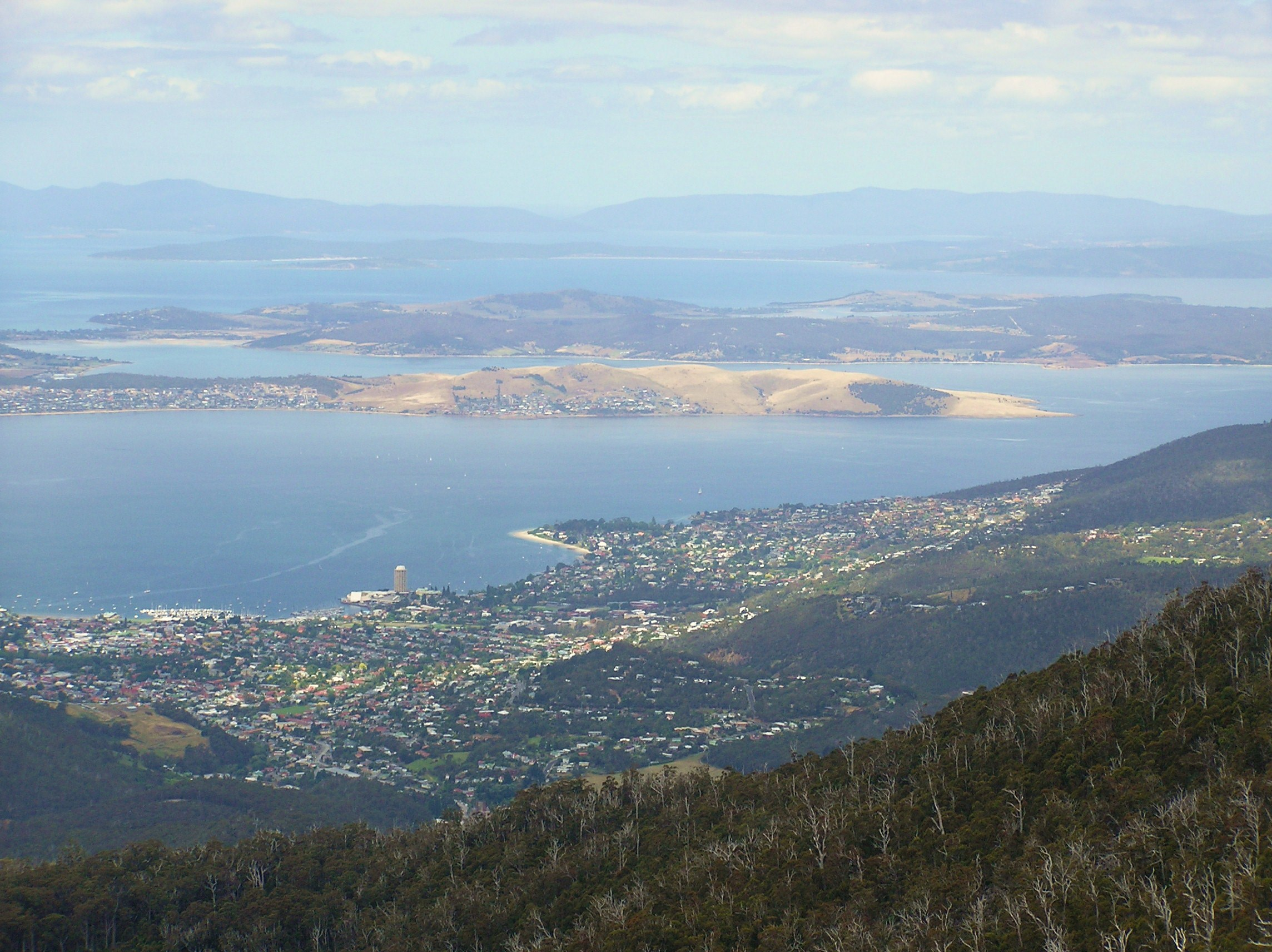
- Dynnyrne, Sandy Bay, and South Hobart

- Interactive map of Dynnyrne
- Coordinates: 42°54′4″S 147°18′51″E
- Country: Australia
- State: Tasmania
- Region: Hobart
- City: Hobart
- LGA: City of Hobart
- Location: 3 km (1.9 mi) SW of Hobart

Government
  - State electorate: Clark
  - Federal division: Clark

Area
  - Total: 1.6 km^{2} (0.62 sq mi)

Population
  - Total: 1,577 (2016 census)
  - Density: 925.6/km^{2} (2,397/sq mi)
- Postcode: 7005
Suburbs around Dynnyrne
South Hobart	South Hobart	Battery Point
Cascades	Dynnyrne	Sandy Bay
Ridgeway	Tolmans Hill	Sandy Bay

Dynnyrne /ˈdɪnɜːrn/ is a residential locality in the local government area (LGA) of Hobart in the Hobart LGA region of Tasmania. The locality is about 3 kilometres (1.9 mi) south-west of the town of Hobart. The 2016 census recorded a population of 1577 for the state suburb of Dynnyrne.

It is a suburb of Hobart, with views over the River Derwent, that is largely situated on a hill south-west of the city above the Southern Outlet, and the suburb of Sandy Bay. The suburb border stretches from the Fitzroy Gardens in the north, to the University of Tasmania apartments in the south, and up the Waterworks Valley to the west. Other nearby suburbs are South Hobart and Tolmans Hill. Dynnyrne is Tasmania's second most affluent suburb according to documents released by the Australian Taxation Office.

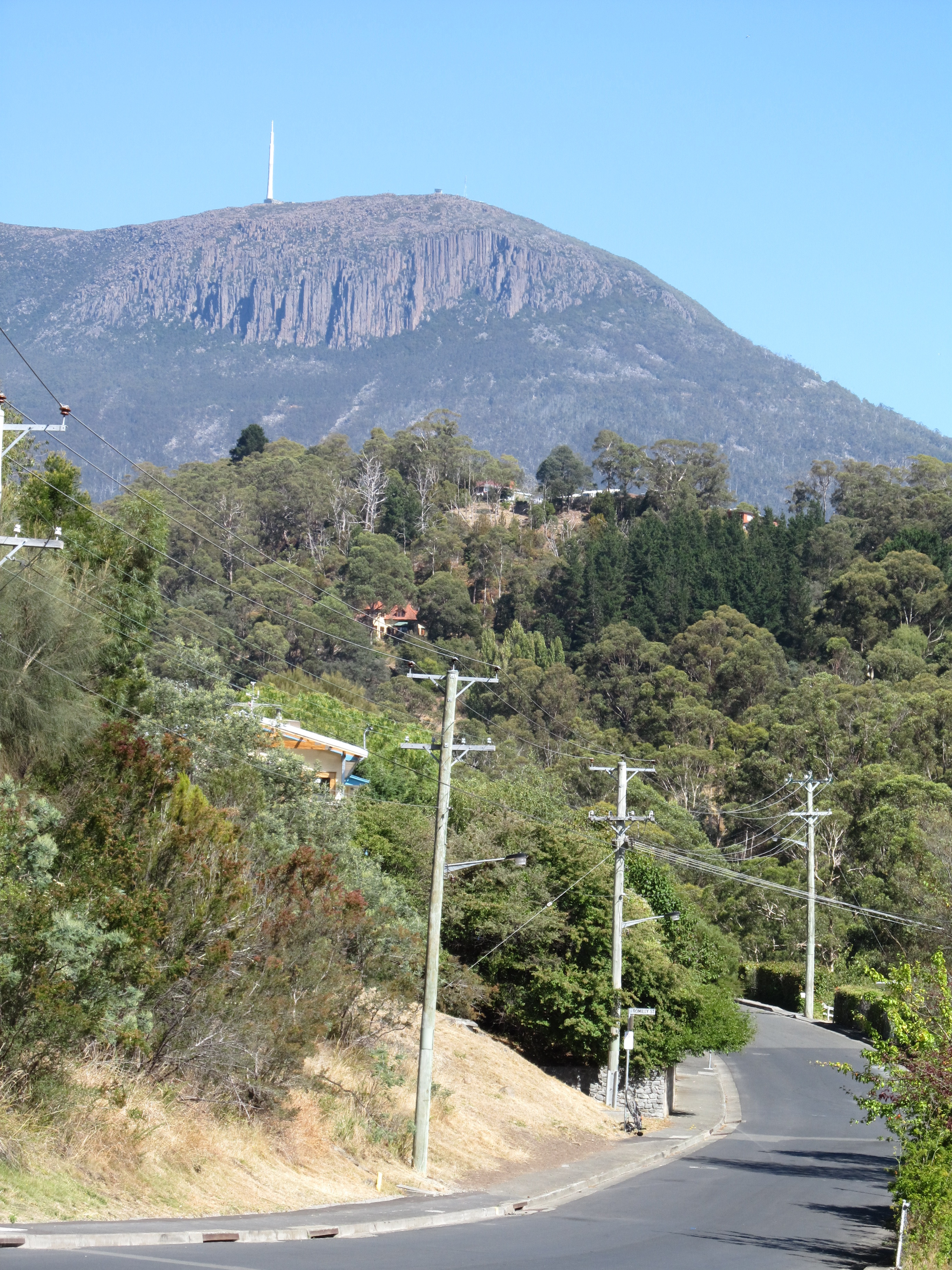
kunanyi/Mt Wellington viewed from Dynnyrne

== History ==
Dynnyrne was gazetted as a locality in 1970.

The suburb is named for Dynnyrne House in South Hobart, which was built by Robert William Murray (1777–1850) who claimed to be descended from Sir William Murray, 1st baronet of Dunearn in Scotland.

Members of the public had been invited to suggest names for the suburb in 1940. About eighty different suggestions were received and six of them were forwarded to the Post Office for consideration. Cooloola, Illawarra, Karinga, Telopea, Rosslyn and Pambula were all rejected on the basis that they exactly or closely duplicated names already used in Australia. Following further consultation with the Post Office, Dynnyrne was chosen, recalling the first house built in the area about one hundred years earlier. One of the Hobart City Council aldermen warned that people would have difficulty spelling Dynnyrne but the new name was adopted.

== Geography ==
Sandy Bay Rivulet forms part of the northern boundary, while Rifle Range Creek forms part of the eastern.

== Road infrastructure ==
The Southern Outlet runs through from north-east to south-west.
