= South Hobart =

- Suburb
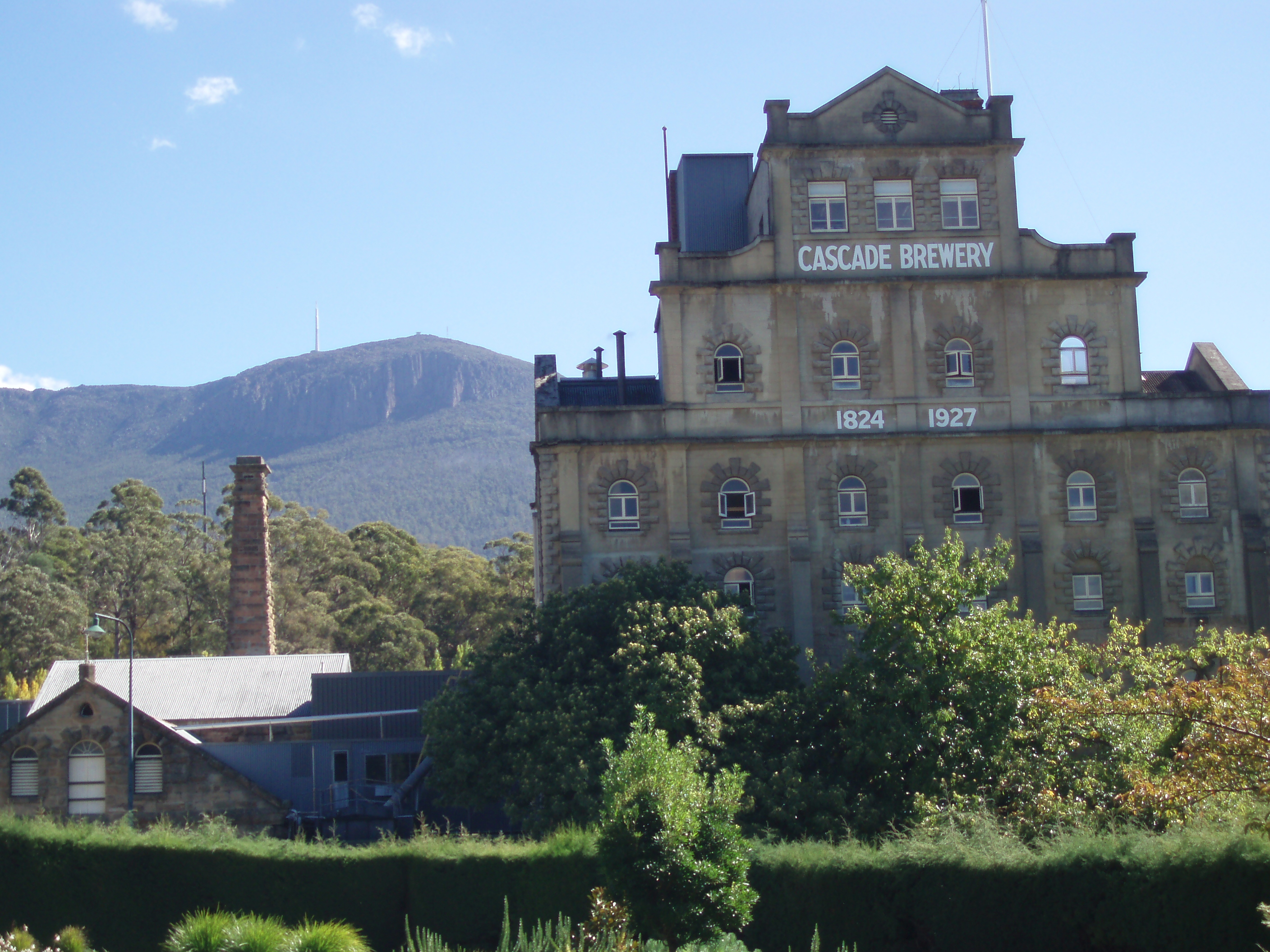
- Cascade Brewery

- Interactive map of South Hobart
- Coordinates: 42°53′33″S 147°18′58″E
- Country: Australia
- State: Tasmania
- City: Hobart
- LGA: City of Hobart

Government
  - State electorate: Clark
  - Federal division: Clark

Population
  - Total: 5,886 (2021 census)
- Postcode: 7004
- Website: South Hobart
Suburbs around South Hobart
West Hobart	West Hobart	Hobart CBD
Cascades	South Hobart	Battery Point
Cascades	Dynnyrne	Sandy Bay

South Hobart is an inner suburb of Hobart. It is bound by Dynnyrne, Fern Tree, West Hobart and the Hobart central business district.

== Landmarks ==
South Hobart is home to many of the most beautiful homes in Hobart, including the classical Georgian residence of Milton and the Henry Hunter-designed Ashleigh.

The Cascades Female Factory Historic site in South Hobart is Australia’s most significant site associated with female convicts and sits in the shadow of Mount Wellington. When the factory operated from 1828 to 1856, more than 5,000 convict women spent time there. The factory was established on the site of a failed rum distillery which was adapted and gradually expanded to comprise five conjoined, rectangular walled yards. After 1856, the site was used for a variety of institutional purposes before being sold in 1904 and subdivided.

The Cascade Brewery, the oldest brewery in Australia, is located here.

Another landmark is All Saints' Anglican Church. Established in 1858, it is heritage listed. The building was designed by the prominent architect Henry Hunter. The Church is also renowned for containing a memorial plaque for school teacher and founder of women's cricket in Australia, Lily Poulett-Harris.

South Hobart is also famous for its Keen's Curry sign. Originally, the sign read "VR 60" to mark the Diamond Jubilee of Queen Victoria. This was created when the son-in-law of the company's founder purchased land in the foothills of Mount Wellington, overlooking Hobart, and in 1905 transformed it into a large advertising sign. Heavy stones were collected from the site, painted white and used to form the words 'Keen's Curry' in letters some fifty feet (15 m) high. Public uproar resulted, but Horace won the right to use it as an advertising sign. In June 1926 the familiar landmark briefly changed to read 'Hell's Curse' as a university prank, and students altered it again in 1962 to promote a theatre production. In 1994 the landmark read 'No Cable Car' as a protest against a proposed development. After every change the sign was restored and as of 2026, though overgrown, is still in place.

== Culture ==
The area is known for its high green vote which is reflected by the existence of a community sustainability network. This is coordinated through a community. There is a strong sense of community, in part created by the suburb's location. It has an active community association, the South Hobart Progress Association: founded in 1922, this is one of the oldest such organisations in Tasmania.

Additionally, community involvement to preserve the presence of platypus in the Hobart Rivulet has attracted media attention.

All Saints' Anglican Church is today known for being Hobart's centre of Anglo-Catholic worship.

The Cascade Hotel was host to the weekly Gypsy Jazz Jam session, every Wednesday, for locals and visiting artists, but ceased around 2019. The restaurant and public bar remain vibrant with live music (occasionally) and food.

== Sport ==
The suburb is home to the South Hobart Football Club, and the H Thompson Badminton Centre is located at 101 Cascade Road.

== Education ==
South Hobart Primary School is the local public primary school, located at 59 Anglesea Street. Students, if using the public education system will eventually attend Taroona High School for grades 7 through 10, and then Hobart College for year 11 and 12.

It is notable that according to the Australian Bureau of Statistics 2021 data, that South Hobart has 51.7% tertiary education compared to 21.9% for other Tasmanian residents, and 26.3% for Australia in general. Snapshots of South Hobart population statistics are available from the ABS website.

== History ==
Upper Macquarie Street Post Office opened on 1 April 1874. It was renamed Cascade Road in 1884 and Hobart South in 1895.

Settled by the merchant and professional classes, who wanted to get away from the noise and smell of Hobarton, South Hobart is Hobart's first suburb.

== Utilities ==
Huon Road runs through South Hobart and is an extension of Davey Street (formerly Holbrook Place). Huon Road used to be named the Huon Highway and was the major road to the Huon Valley until the opening of the Southern Outlet during the latter half of the 20th century. Autumn time during the 1950s would see apple trucks continually travelling along this road carting apples to Europe, thus helping Tasmania to earn its title of The Apple Isle.

South Hobart is located alongside the Hobart Rivulet which was the main fresh water source that leads through to the Hobart central business district from Wellington Park. As a result, it has facilities as a popular park and transportation route for recreation and commuting to access destinations. The suburb also has one of the highest rates of commuter cycling in Australia, seven times higher than Greater Hobart. 15% walk to work.

A refuse tip is located here within McRobies Gully, and also contains the tip shop, which is located at the McRobies Gully Waste Management Centre (the tip), at the end of McRobies Road in South Hobart. This facility provides reuse, recycling, and refuse options for disposal of unwanted goods.

== Transport ==
South Hobart is served by Metro Tasmania bus routes 446 and 446 to and from Hobart Bus Mall.

== Notable residents ==
- Richard Flanagan (1961-) – author
- Haughton Forrest Cpt. (1826–1925) – artist
- John Skinner Prout (1805–1876) – colonial artist
- Morton Allport (1830–1878) – photographer
