= City of Hobart =

Local government area in Australia

- Local government area
- Flag of the City of Hobart

- Interactive map of City of Hobart
- Coordinates: 42.8978°S 147.2877°E
- Country: Australia
- State: Tasmania
- Region: Central Hobart
- Established: 1 January 1852
- Council seat: Hobart

Government
  - Lord Mayor: Charles Wooley
  - State electorate: Clark; Hobart; Elwick; Nelson
  - Federal division: Clark

Area
  - Total: 77.9 km^{2} (30.1 sq mi)

Population
  - Total: 53,684 (2018)
  - Density: 689.1/km^{2} (1,784.9/sq mi)
- Website: City of Hobart
LGAs around City of Hobart
Glenorchy	Glenorchy	Clarence
Glenorchy	City of Hobart	Clarence
Kingborough	Kingborough	River Derwent

The City of Hobart is a local government area in Tasmania which covers the central metropolitan area of the state capital, Hobart. The city is governed by Hobart City Council and led by the Lord Mayor.

The local government area has a population of 53,684 and includes the suburbs of West Hobart, Lenah Valley, Mount Stuart, South Hobart, New Town, Sandy Bay and most of Fern Tree, North Hobart and Mount Nelson:

== History and attributes ==
The present city council was created in 1852 by act of parliament, and the city mayor raised to Lord Mayor in 1934.

Mount Wellington and the River Derwent are major features of the natural environment of the City of Hobart. 61% of the area is bushland.

=== Sister cities ===
- Yaizu, Japan (1977)
- L'Aquila, l’Aquila, Abruzzo, Italy (1980)

==== Former Sister cities ====
- Invercargill, New Zealand
- Valdivia, Los Ríos, Chile (1998)
- Barile, Basilicata, Italy (2009)
- Xi'an, Shaanxi, China (2015)
- Fuzhou, Fujian, China (2017)

== Government ==
The City of Hobart is governed by the Hobart City Council, consisting of twelve aldermen headed by the Lord Mayor of Hobart. The current Lord Mayor is Charles Wooley, after winning the 2026 Council Election.

Hobart City Council

Leadership
- Lord Mayor: Charles Wooley, Independent
- Deputy Lord Mayor: Vacant
- CEO: Michael Stretton

Structure
- Council political groups: Independent (3) Green (2) Ind. Liberal (2) Ind. Labor (1) Ind. National (1)

Elections
- Last Council election: 3–25 October 2022
- Next Council election: October 2026

Meeting place
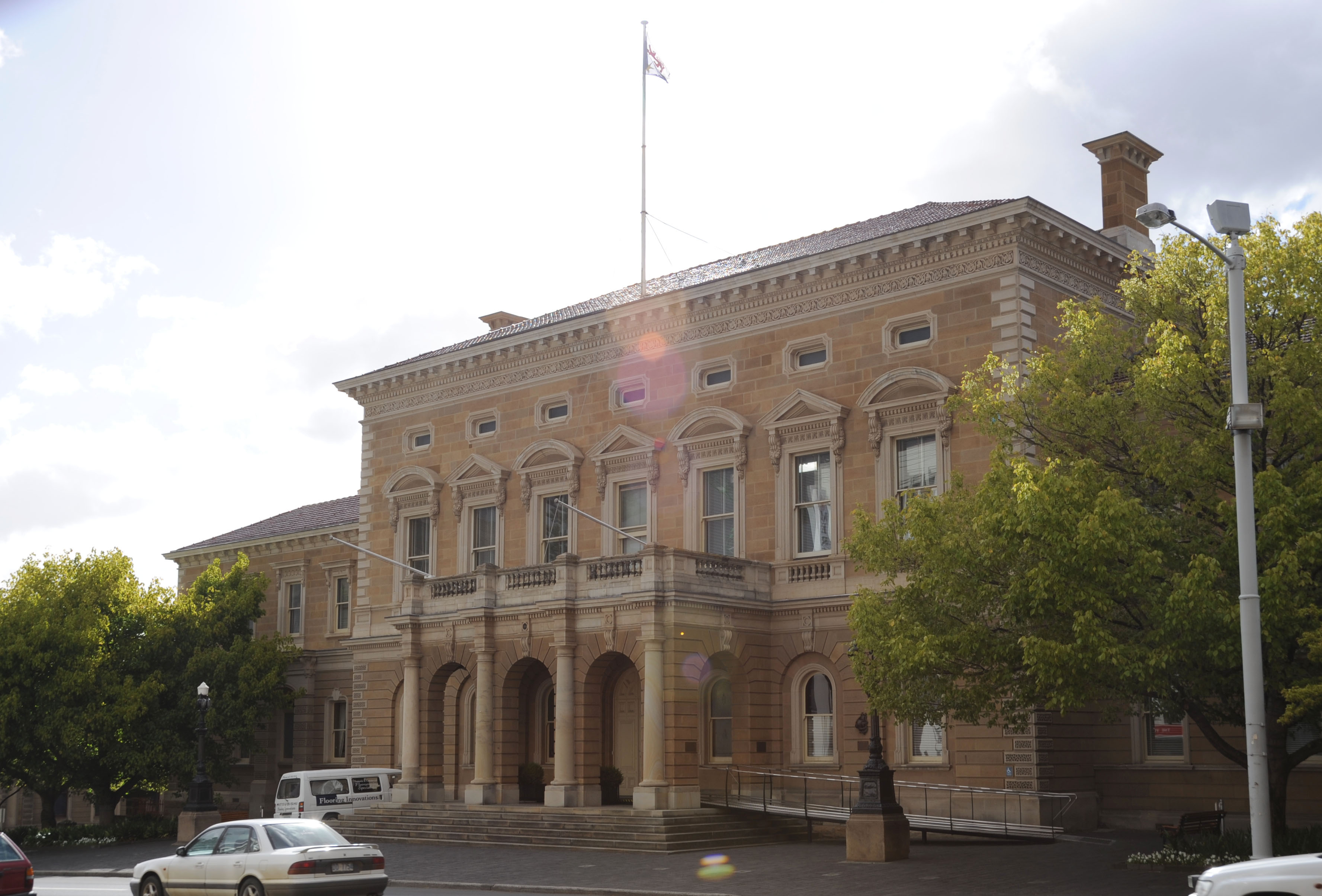
- Hobart Town Hall; Hobart, Tasmania

Aldermen are elected every four years. They are elected by use of Single transferable voting.

Name	Position	Party
Charles Wooley	Lord Mayor/Councillor	Independent
Zelinda Sherlock	Councillor	Greens
Ryan Posselt	Councillor	Independent Labor
Simon Behrakis	Councillor	Independent Liberal
Louise Elliot	Councillor	Independent National
Harvey Lennon	Councillor	Independent Liberal
John Kelly	Councillor	Independent
Mike Dutta	Councillor	Independent
Bill Harvey	Councillor	Greens

Following the 2026 election, former councillor Ben Lohberger was elected Deputy Lord Mayor, however was not elected as councillor, leaving the position to be decided on by the elected council.

== Election results ==
=== 2022 ===

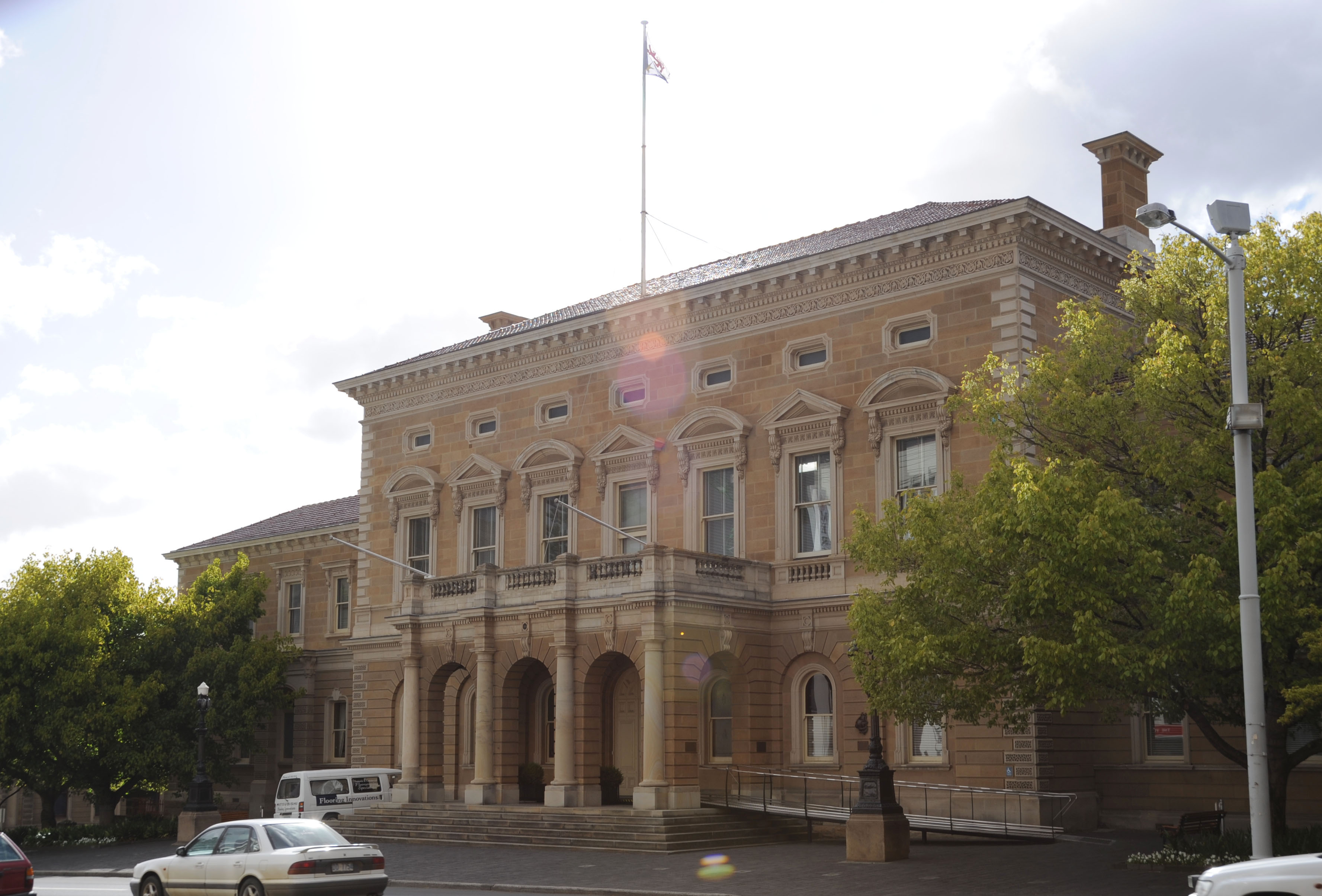
Hobart Town Hall

2022 Tasmanian local elections: Hobart
Party	Candidate	Votes	%	±%
Your Hobart Independents	Anna Reynolds (elected)	4,266	13.89	
Independent	John Kelly (elected)	4,067	13.24	
Independent	Marti Zucco (elected)	2,150	7.00	
Independent	Louise Elliot (elected)	1,824	5.94	
Greens	Helen Burnet (elected)	1,529	4.98	
Independent Liberal	Louise Bloomfield (elected)	1,473	4.80	
Independent Liberal	Simon Behrakis (elected)	1,448	4.72	
Your Hobart Independents	Mike Dutta (elected)	1,230	4.01	
Greens	Bill Harvey (elected)	1,219	3.97	
Independent Labor	Ryan Posselt (elected)	1,016	3.31	
Independent	Ben Lohberger (elected)	936	3.05	
Independent	Jax Fox	838	2.73	
Your Hobart Independents	Zelinda Sherlock (elected)	656	2.14	
Your Hobart Independents	Kate Kelly	646	2.10	
Independent	Jeff Briscoe	605	1.97	
Our Hobart	Marcus Bai	572	1.86	
Your Hobart Independents	Brian Corr	500	1.63	
Independent Liberal	Will Coats	486	1.58	
Independent	Damon Thomas	459	1.49	
Greens	Gemma Kitsos	428	1.39	
Your Hobart Independents	Matt Etherington	373	1.21	
Independent	Steven Phipps	350	1.14	
Greens	Bec Taylor	321	1.05	
Greens	Nathan Volf	281	0.92	
Independent	Debra Thurley	270	0.88	
Independent	Edwin Johnstone	268	0.87	
Your Hobart Independents	Juniper Shaw	258	0.84	
Independent Liberal	James McKee	256	0.83	
Our Hobart	Ron Christie	241	0.78	
Independent	Yang Liu	225	0.73	
Independent	Sam Campbell	213	0.69	
Your Hobart Independents	Raj Chopra	169	0.55	
Ind. Liberal Democrat	Duncan Spender	157	0.51	
Independent	Tiina Sexton	137	0.45	
Our Hobart	Lili Christie	131	0.43	
Independent Liberal	Daniel Geng	127	0.41	
Independent Liberal	Stefan Vogel	115	0.37	
Independent	Jono Stagg	108	0.35	
Independent	Michael Jackson	99	0.32	
Our Hobart	Ling Ling Gao	76	0.25	
Independent	Joe Grech	72	0.23	
Our Hobart	Owen Davies	42	0.14	
Our Hobart	Karen Rothery	39	0.13	
Independent	Cadence Mitchell	32	0.10	
Total formal votes		30,708	96.70	
Informal votes		1,047	3.30	
Turnout		31,755	82.38	
Party total votes
Independent		12,653	41.21	
Your Hobart Independents		8,098	26.37	
Independent Liberal		3,905	12.72	
Greens		3,778	12.30	
Our Hobart		1,101	3.59	
Independent Labor		1,016	3.31	
Independent Liberal Democrat		157	0.51	
Party total seats			Seats	±
Independent			4	
Your Hobart Independents			3	
Greens			2	
Independent Liberal			2	
Independent Labor			1	

== Localities ==
=== Hobart suburbs ===
• Battery Point • Dynnyrne • Fern Tree • Glebe • Hobart central business district • Lenah Valley • Mount Nelson • Mount Stuart • New Town • North Hobart • Ridgeway • Sandy Bay • South Hobart • Tolmans Hill • West Hobart

=== Other localities ===
• Kingston • Neika • Queens Domain • Wellington Park • West Moonah

== Economy ==
The Hobart City Council estimates that on weekdays "close to 50% of the population of Greater Hobart would be in the City for working, shopping, education, personal business or leisure purposes".

Major industries by employment:

- Health and Community Services 17%
- Retail Trade 13%
- Property and Business Services 12%
- Government Administration 12%
- Education 9%

The City has five major hospitals and fire, police, and emergency service headquarters.

== Demographics ==
Hobart is classified as an urban capital city (UCC) under the Australian Classification of Local Governments.

Selected historical census data for City of Hobart local government area
Census year		2001	2006	2011	2016	2021
Population	Estimated residents on census night	46,622	47,700	48,703	50,439	55,077
Population	LGA rank in terms of size within Tasmania		3rd	3rd	3rd	
Population	% of Tasmania population	10.25%	▼10.01%	▼9.83%	▲9.89%	
Population	% of Australian population	0.25%	▼0.24%	▲0.23%	▼0.22%	
Cultural and language diversity						
Ancestry, top responses	English			29.6%	▼29.4%	▲39.3%
Ancestry, top responses	Australian			26.6%	▼23.7%	▲30.9%
Ancestry, top responses	Irish			9.1%	▲9.7%	▲11.9%
Ancestry, top responses	Scottish			7.8%	▲8.3%	▲11.1%
Ancestry, top responses	Chinese			3.2%	▲4.4%	▲8.5%
Language, top responses (other than English)	Mandarin	0.7%	▲1.5%	▲2.3%	▲4.0%	▲6.1%
Language, top responses (other than English)	Nepali					1.9%
Language, top responses (other than English)	Cantonese	0.6%	▲0.7%	0.7%	▲0.8%	▲1.1%
Language, top responses (other than English)	Punjabi					0.7%
Language, top responses (other than English)	Greek	1.1%	1.1%	▼1.0%	▼0.9%	▼0.7%
Language, top responses (other than English)	Italian	1.0%	▼0.9%	▼0.8%	▼0.7%	
Language, top responses (other than English)	German	0.5%	▲0.6%		0.6%	
Language, top responses (other than English)	Arabic			0.8%		
Religious affiliation						
Religious affiliation, top responses	No religion	23.5%	▲28.5%	▲37.5%	▲46.4%	▲54.6%
Religious affiliation, top responses	Catholic	20.7%	▼19.5%	▼17.7%	▼14.2%	▼11.9%
Religious affiliation, top responses	Anglican	25.8%	▼22.2%	▼18.7%	▼13.7%	▼10.3%
Religious affiliation, top responses	Not Stated					5.6%
Religious affiliation, top responses	Hinduism					3.3%
Religious affiliation, top responses	Uniting	4.6%	▼4.0%	▼3.0%	▼2.1%	
Religious affiliation, top responses	Presbyterian	2.2%	▼1.9%			
Religious affiliation, top responses	Buddhism			1.9%		
Median weekly incomes						
Personal income	Median weekly personal income		A$526	A$641	A$718	A$886
Personal income	% of Australian median income		112.9%	111.1%	108.5%	
Family income	Median weekly family income		A$1380	A$1782	A$2023	A$2324
Family income	% of Australian median income		117.9%	120.3%	116.7%	
Household income	Median weekly household income		A$1036	A$1260	A$1439	A$1842
Household income	% of Australian median income		100.9%	102.1%	100.0%	
Dwelling structure						
Dwelling type	Separate house	67.1%	▲68.7%	▼68.3%	▲68.6%	▲68.9%
Dwelling type	Semi-detached, terrace or townhouse	9.3%	10.6%▲	▲10.8%	10.8%	▲11.4%
Dwelling type	Flat or apartment	22.1%	▼19.9%	▲20.0%	▼19.7%	▼18.8%
Dwelling type	Other Dwelling					0.5

== Coat of arms ==
Coat of arms of City of Hobart
Crest On a wreath Argent and Azure a three masted sailing ship in full sail Or, mantled Azure doubled Or. Escutcheon Azure an estoile Or on a chief Argent a lion passant Gules. Supporters On the dexter side an emu and on the sinister side a kangaroo both reguardant and each gorged with a chaplet of apples leaved all Proper. Motto 'Sic Fortis Hobartia Crevit.'

== See also ==
- List of local government areas of Tasmania
- List of mayors and lord mayors of Hobart
