= Salamanca (disambiguation) =

Salamanca is a city in western Spain and the capital of the province of the same name.

Salamanca may also refer to:

== Places ==
=== Argentina ===
- Salamanca Formation, a Paleocene geological formation

=== Australia ===
- Salamanca Place, a waterfront precinct in Hobart, Tasmania
  - Salamanca Market, a weekend street market held at Salamanca Place
  - Salamanca Arts Centre, an arts centre at Salamanca Place

=== Chile ===
- Salamanca, Chile, a town in Choapa Province

=== Colombia ===
- Salamanca Island, a national park island near Barranquilla, connected by the Pumarejo Bridge

=== Mexico ===
- Salamanca, Guanajuato, a city in Guanajuato
- Salamanca de Bacalar, a former name for Bacalar, Quintana Roo

=== Panama ===
- Salamanca, Colón

=== Peru ===
- Salamanca de Monterrico, a neighbourhood in Ate District, Lima
- Salamanca District, a district of Condesuyos Province in the Arequipa Region

=== Spain ===
- Province of Salamanca, a province of Spain
- Salamanca (Madrid), a district and neighbourhood of Madrid
- University of Salamanca, a public university in the city of Salamanca

=== United States ===
- Salamanca (city), New York
  - Salamanca station, now the Salamanca Rail Museum
- Salamanca (town), New York

=== Venezuela ===
- Salamanca, Venezuela, a town

== People ==
- Amaia Salamanca (born 1986), Spanish actress
- Antonio Salamanca (1479–1562), Italian print publisher
- Arturo Pomar Salamanca (1931–2016), Spanish chess player
- Carlos Salamanca (born 1983), Colombian tennis player
- Daniel Salamanca (1869–1935), president of Bolivia
- Diego de Salamanca (1519–1588), Puerto Rican bishop
- Eliseo Salamanca (born 1979), Salvadoran footballer
- Gabriel Camargo Salamanca (1942–2022), Colombian businessman
- Gabriel von Salamanca-Ortenburg (1489–1539), Austrian-Habsburg official and general
- J. R. Salamanca (1922–2013), American writer and professor
- José de Salamanca, 1st Count of los Llanos (1811–1883), Spanish nobleman, politician and businessman
- Juan de Salamanca (1490–1538), Spanish bishop
- Juan Salamanca (born 1967), Chilean table tennis player
- Julio Salamanca (born 1989), Salvadoran weightlifter
- Manuel Salamanca (1927–2010), Chilean footballer
- Manuel Silvestre de Salamanca Cano (died 1775), Spanish colonial governor of Chile
- Mauricio Santa María Salamanca (born 1966), Colombian economist and politician
- Olivia Salamanca (1889–1913), Filipino physician
- Sara Ugarte de Salamanca (1866–1925), Bolivian poet
- Sebastián de Salamanca (died 1526), Spanish bishop

== Fictional characters ==
- Salamanca family, a fictional crime family in Breaking Bad and Better Call Saul
  - Hector Salamanca
  - Tuco Salamanca
  - Leonel and Marco Salamanca
  - Lalo Salamanca

== Other uses ==
- Salamanca, an early English steam locomotive
- Battle of Salamanca, an 1812 battle of the Peninsular War
- Battle of Salamanca (1858)
- School of Salamanca, a 16th-century Spanish intellectual movement
- UD Salamanca, a former Spanish association football club
- SS Salamanca, a list of ships with this name
- Salamanca, a cave in Hispanic-American legend
