= 10 Murray Street =

Former office building in Hobart, Australia

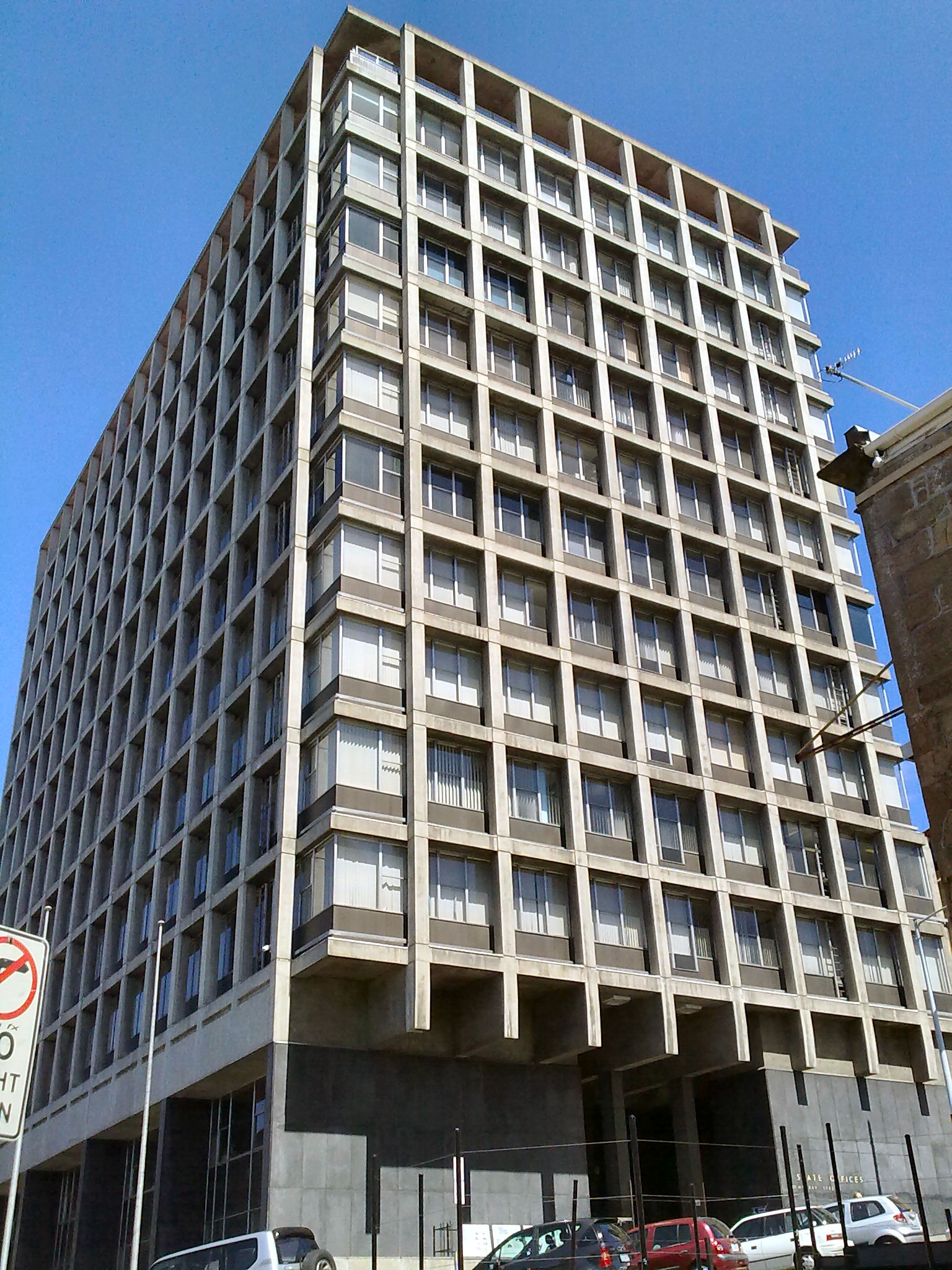
- Interactive map of the 10 Murray Street area

General information
- Type: Administration building
- Location: 10 Murray Street, Hobart, Australia
- Coordinates: 42.8850°S 147.3302°E
- Completed: 1966
- Opening: 1969
- Demolished: 2018
- Owner: Citta Property Group

Height
- Roof: 47 m (154 ft)

Technical details
- Floor count: 14
- Floor area: 9,660 m^{2} (100,000 sq ft)

Design and construction
- Architects: Hartley Wilson & Partners

10 Murray Street was the address of the former State Offices building in Hobart, Australia, and the name by which the building was frequently known. It was a brutalist office building located behind Parliament House and close to Salamanca Place. The building was fully occupied by the Tasmanian Government, and was linked to Parliament House via a skyway. 10 Murray Street was demolished in 2018 as part of the Parliament Square redevelopment.

== History ==
Construction of the State Offices building commenced in July 1966 and was completed in 1969. The design was prepared by architect Dirk Bolt, who had been in partnership with David Hartley Wilson in Hobart since 1958. Later that year Bolt left Tasmania to establish a practice in Canberra, and Wilson, responding to instructions from the then Director of Public Works, modified the design and took the project through to completion, with the building ultimately rising twelve storeys above ground level. The completed building provided additional government office accommodation intended to relieve overcrowding within Parliament House and other nearby State offices.

The building had three ground floor levels, including a reception level raised on broad steps above Murray Street, ten floors of offices, and a penthouse level containing the plant room and a caretaker's office. It was constructed in reinforced concrete with an externally expressed structural frame, partly to avoid the expense of imported steel, and its windows were recessed to prevent a glass curtain wall effect.

During construction, the former Hydro-Electric Department headquarters to the north (known as Building 4 in the Parliament Square complex) was temporarily supported on steel needling while its original footings were removed and replaced beneath a new sub‑basement at a deeper level. Following completion of 10 Murray Street in 1969, the Public Works Department and the Taxation Department relocated there from the 1937–39 State Government Offices (Building 5). In 1971 major renovations were carried out to Building 5 to prepare it for the needs of the Department of Health, and in 1973 a substantial overhaul of Building 4 was commissioned prior to the State’s Social Welfare Department moving into that building; this work included replacement of the original timber-framed windows and Huon pine sills with aluminium-framed units, while some Tasmanian blackwood‑panelled rooms on the upper floor remained intact.

10 Murray Street was fully occupied by the Tasmanian Government and was linked to Parliament House by a raised enclosed skyway. The building is one of relatively few multi-storey postwar International style and brutalist office towers constructed in Tasmania, and its distinctive gridded concrete frame and restrained material palette prompted both criticism and support in later debates over its future.

== Demolition ==
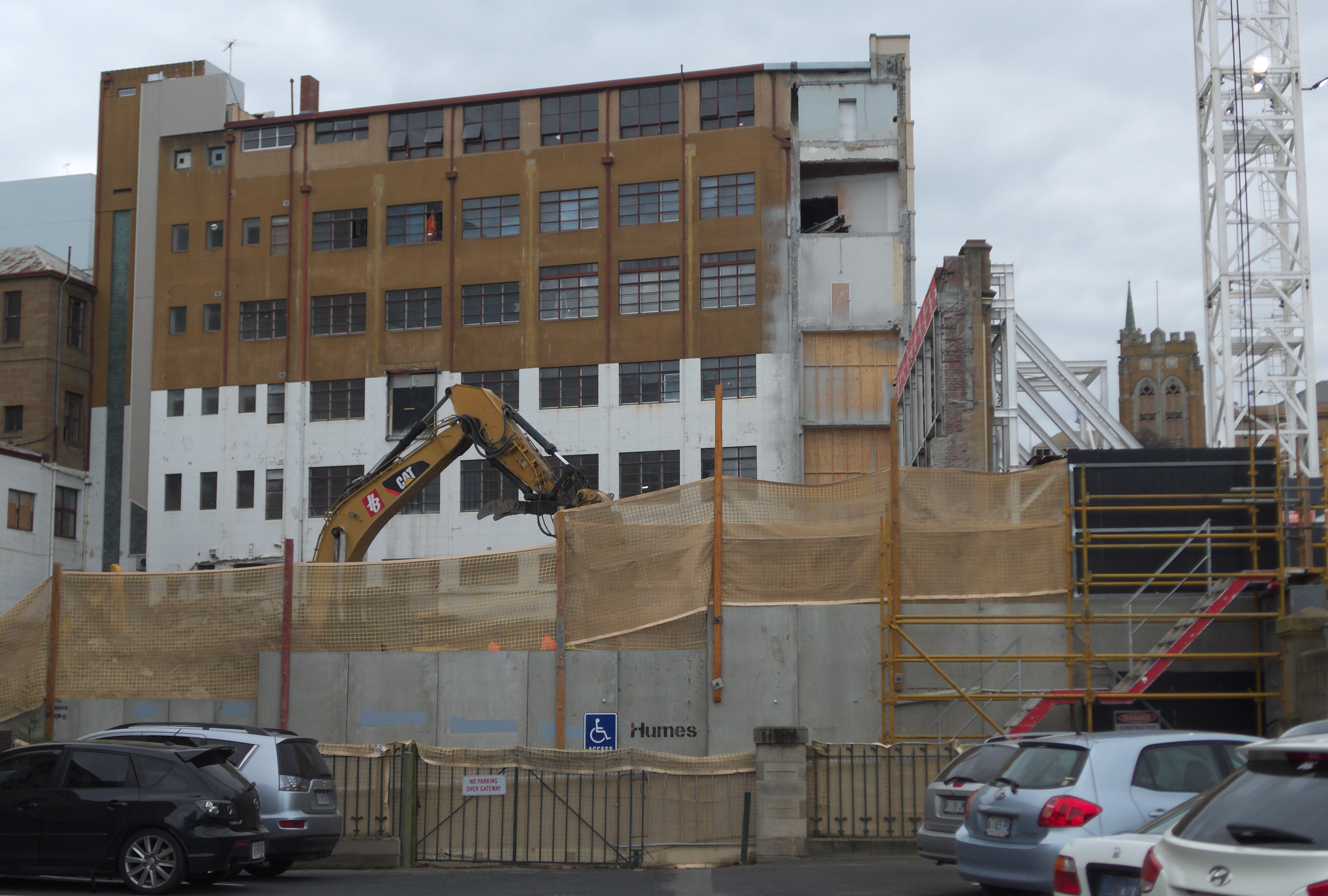
Site after demolition

In 2009 the State Government announced Citta Property Group as the successful proponent for the sale and redevelopment of 10 Murray Street and the surrounding "Parliament Square" precinct. Citta proposed demolition of 10 Murray Street, creation of a new public square on the Murray Street side, upgrading and retaining most of the older Davey Street-facing buildings, and construction of a new seven-storey building facing Salamanca Place. The 19th‑century building known as the Red Brick Building was also slated for demolition, while new shops, cafes and an amphitheatre with a large screen for public events were included in the proposal.

Opposition to the loss of 10 Murray Street led to the formation of the "Save 10 Murray" group, led by filmmaker Briony Kidd, which lodged an appeal with the Resources Management and Planning Appeals Tribunal and pursued a broader public campaign. As part of these efforts, the group staged the 2010 exhibition Please Don’t Let Me Be Misunderstood at the former building, inviting A4‑sized creative responses to the architecture from artists, designers and members of the public; the exhibition design referenced the building’s local nickname, "the milk crate", through a gridded display of works.

In July 2011 the Supreme Court of Tasmania ruled that the 1960s office tower could be demolished, but remitted part of the proposal to the Tribunal to consider the heritage value of the former Government Printing Office in Salamanca Place. In December 2011 the Resources Management and Planning Appeals Tribunal found there was no feasible alternative to demolishing the heritage‑listed art deco printing office, clearing the last legal obstacle to the Parliament Square redevelopment; members of the Save 10 Murray group criticised the decision as undermining the practical effect of heritage listing.

Demolition of 10 Murray Street began in September 2017, with the building dismantled floor by floor because of its proximity to Parliament House and the adjoining Parliament Square works. The project has been described as the largest building demolition in Tasmanian history, involving the removal and on‑site crushing of around 20,000 tonnes of concrete and significant quantities of steel, much of which was stockpiled for later recycling. By August 2018 the 47‑metre, fourteen‑storey office tower had been completely removed.

== See also ==
- List of tallest buildings in Hobart
