= John Lee Archer =

Australian colonial architect

John Archer.
- Born: John Lee Archer; 26 April 1791; Chatham, Kent, England
- Died: 4 December 1852 (aged 61); Stanley, Tasmania, Australia
- Resting place: Circular Head Cemetery
- Occupations: Civil Engineer and Colonial Architect, magistrate and public servant in Van Diemen's Land
- Years active: 1827-1838 (architect), 1838-1852 (magistrate)
- Known for: Design of Georgian Renaissance and Gothic Revival public buildings, many handmade by convict labour, made typically with sandstone and brick, constructed in Hobart and throughout Tasmania
- Spouse: Sophia Mattinson

John Lee Archer (26 April 1791 near Chatham, Kent, England – 4 December 1852 in Stanley, Tasmania, Australia) was the Civil Engineer and Colonial Architect in Van Diemen's Land, serving from 1827 to 1838. During his tenure, Archer was responsible for all Tasmanian government buildings including those for penal and military purposes.

His major architectural works include Parliament House, Hobart, the Treasury and the Audit Department buildings in Hobart, the Ordnance Stores in Salamanca Place, several buildings at Anglesea Barracks; St John's Church, New Town; the nave of St George's Church at Battery Point; Old Trinity (the Penitentiary Chapel) in Hobart; St Luke's Presbyterian Church at Bothwell, St Luke's Church of England at Richmond; and parts of the Campbell Street Gaol, Hobart. His major engineering work was the stone bridge, which still carries the Midland Highway over the Macquarie River at Ross.

== Personal life ==
John Lee Archer, born 26 April 1791, was a notable architect whose work helped shape the development of the townships of Tasmania during early settlement. He was the only son of John Archer, an Irish engineer from County Tipperary, and his wife Charlotte Lee, formerly of Kent, England.

The first records show that Archer, at the age of 18, was taught under the guidance of Charles Beazley, an architect based in London. Commencing in April 1809, Archer remained under Beazley's instruction for the duration of his three-year term of articles before moving on to the office of John Rennie the Elder in April 1813 in the position of drawing clerk. Archer's employment with Rennie was terminated in 1818, he returned to Ireland and worked as an engineer for over 8 years, building his reputation. Following his father's death in 1822 and the ongoing strain of the economic depression of the time, Archer sought to find employment elsewhere. His opportunity came in December 1826 when John Rennie's son recommended Archer for the position of Colonial Architect in Van Diemen's Land (now Tasmania) as the need arose for the development of public buildings and offices to accommodate the growing convict and free-settler population of Van Diemen's Land.

Upon arrival in Hobart Town on 2 August 1827, Archer immediately commenced work in the role of Civil Engineer and Architect for the colony. Alongside the high demand for prisons and other buildings of a convict nature, the rise in free settlers due to the ongoing depression called for the development of other public works to accommodate the needs of colonial life, such as police offices, public offices, military barracks and churches. For the majority of the 11 years that John Lee Archer served as Civil Engineer and Colonial Architect, he was responsible for all government commissioned buildings, many still notable today.

Archer married Sophia Mattinson of Hobart on 3 September 1833 and the pair established a home in New Town with their many children. Due to a temporary decline in colonial revenue, Archer was retrenched in 1838 and was never reinstated in his role. As others moved in to take over his responsibilities in his absence, Archer became isolated from his profession at the age of 47 with little hope of local employment opportunities.

In October of the same year, Archer moved to north-west Tasmania and took the position of police magistrate for the district of Horton. He stayed with this role for the remainder of his life. In 1843 he produced a map of Stanley, reproduced by Betty Jones in Along the terrace: the owners and occupiers of Stanley 1843 -1922.

John Lee Archer died at the age of 61 on 4 December 1852, and is buried at Circular Head.

== Notable works ==
=== Parliament House, Hobart ===
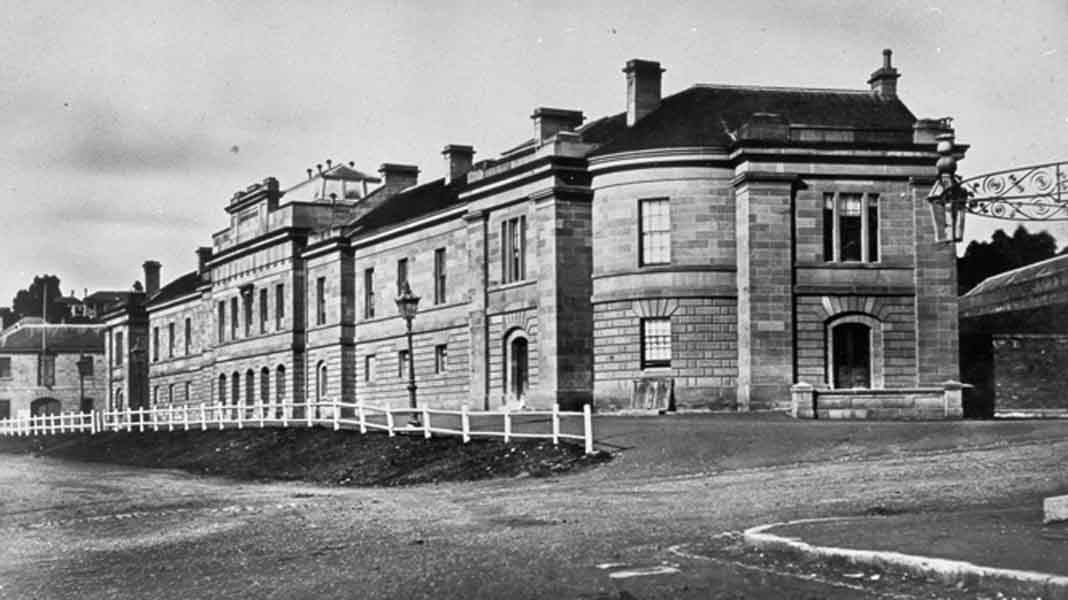
Parliament House, completed between 1835 and 1838, pictured in 1869.

Tasmanian Parliament House is one of John Lee Archer's most notable projects. Its location on the waterfront of Sullivans Cove was seen as ideal for Hobart's new Customs House (which is what it was known as up until 1904). Designed in 1835, construction was completed in 1838 with the majority of labor being carried out by convicts. The Customs Department opened in September 1840 while the first session of Parliament occurred on 19 June 1841. Honey colored sandstone quarried from Salamanca place was used to construct the distinctly 'Colonial Georgian' style building. Parliament House is one of the clearest examples of how Archer designed his work to have a sense of strength and permanence. The entrance hall is fitted with large Doric columns aimed at creating a significant threshold whilst the rusticated masonry and deeply shadowed arches accentuate the boldness of the building and its clean, clear lines. The Old Market Building once screened off the façade, but over its 120 years of existence and further land reclamation, flanking trees, flowerbeds and sweeping lawns, now surround it. Whilst significant renovations to the interior have taken place, and the slate roof was removed and replaced with tiles, the façade still remains today almost exactly how it was first constructed. Unlike a lot of Archer's penal projects, which have since been demolished, Parliament House is still occupied today by the Parliament of Tasmania. For this reason alone it is one of, if not the most significant project of Archer's entire career.

==== Penitentiary Chapel ====
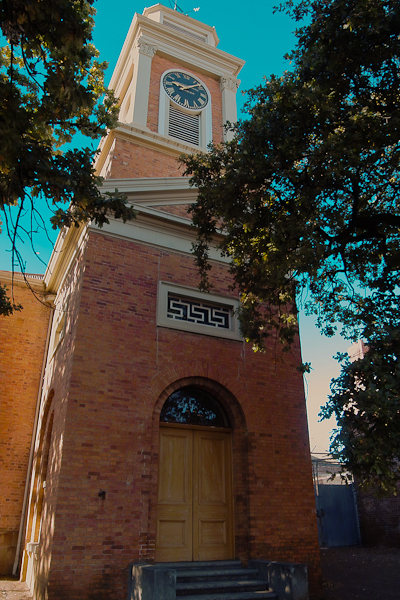
Penitentiary Chapel, completed between 1831 and 1834.

In the 1830s, Van Diemen's Land (now Tasmania) experienced an influx of close to 2000 new convicts, making the total over 10,000. Hobart Town, originally established as a gaol town, was most affected by this population growth. To cope with the increase, penitentiaries were constructed all over the state. In 1829 John Lee Archer was commissioned to design a chapel for the existing Prisoner's Barracks Penitentiary. The chapel was designed to also act as an extension to the already overflowing Barracks. Cruciform in shape, the chapel arms enclosed exercise yards that could hold 500 prisoners on bench seats. Archer was also instructed to construct a cell block beneath the chapel floor to house prisoners in solitary confinement. To support the inclined floors of the chapel above, the cells have varying ceiling heights. Other features of the cells include no ventilation and no sunlight.

Part of the design for the chapel layout included opening up the northern wing to cope with the overflow of people from the nearby St David's Church. As a result of this Archer was free to design the tower for the Brisbane Street entrance to the chapel. The tower has trappings of Renaissance Greek Temples and derived inspiration from the English architect Christopher Wren.

The tower of the chapel has a floor level that is 5 meters above street level to make room for the solitary confinement cells. This allowed an inclusion of a spiralling staircase that ran within the tower. The chapel suffered from time and budget delays and was not in full use until 1833. It was used by the public until 1845 when it was decommissioned and used by police offices, convicts, and their families.

== List of works ==
=== Military ===
- Anglesea Barracks, including the Canteen Building, completed between 1831 and 1834, the Drill Hall, completed in 1828, and the Subalterns' Quarters, completed in 1828
- Ordnance Stores, Salamanca Place, Hobart, completed 1829
- Powder Magazine, completed 1828
- Richmond Barracks, completed between 1833 and 1834

=== Bridges and harbour work ===
- Argyle Street Bridge 1836
- Bridgewater Causeway 1835
- Harrington Street Bridge 1831
- Hobart Rivulet realigned 1828
- Jordan River Bridge, repaired 1835
- Richmond Bridge, repaired 1826–35
- Ross Bridge over the Macquarie River, completed between 1831 and 1836
- Entally Chapel, Hadspen 1835
- Sullivan's Cove improvements, completed in 1830

=== Religious ===
- Jericho Church 1834
- Norfolk Plains Chapel 1829–32
- St David's Church, Hobart (new tower) 1828
- St George's Church, Battery Point, completed between 1836 and 1838
- St John's Anglican Church, New Town, completed between 1834 and 1835
- St John's Church, Ross 1838
- St Luke's Presbyterian Church, Bothwell, completed between 1828 and 1829
- St Luke's Church, Campbell Town 1836
- St Luke's Church of England, Richmond, completed between 1834 and 1836
- St Paul's Church, Stanley 1843–44
- St Peter's Church, Hamilton 1834
- Trinity or Penitentiary Chapel, Hobart 1831–34
- Westbury Church 1836

=== Civil ===
- Court House Hobart, extended 1835
- Court House, Launceston 1837
- Court House & Police Offices, New Norfolk 1831
- Custom House, Hobart 1835–41
- Custom House, Launceston 1836
- Government House, Hobart alterations and repairs
- Offices & Treasures Room, Hobart 1829
- Police Offices, Murray Street, Hobart 1833–35
- Public Offices, Murray Street, Hobart 1837–40

=== Dwellings ===
- Chaplain's Cottage, Maria Island 1827
- Commandant's House, Maria Island 1829
- Gaoler's House, Richmond, completed in 1832
- 'Highfield', Stanley 1843
- 'Jutland', New Town, (Archer's own house) 1831
- Parsonage, Hobart, 1837
- Parsonage, St John's Parish, New Town, completed in 1835
- Store Keeper's Residence, Circular Head 1851

=== Gaols ===
- Factory, Maria Island 1829
- Female Factory, Cascades 1827
- Female House of Correction, Launceston, 1832
- Hobart Gaol, 1829
- Lock-up Houses, New Norfolk 1830
- Oatlands Gaol, 1834
- Richmond Gaol, 1832–35

=== Hospitals ===
- Hamilton 1836
- Norfolk Plains 1836
- Oatlands 1836
- Willow Court, New Norfolk 1827–1830

=== Lighthouses ===
- Cape Bruny Lighthouse 1835–38
- Low Head Lighthouse 1833–38

=== Others ===
- Theatre Royal, Hobart, 1834
- Dairy 'Highfield' for the Van Diemen's Land Company 1842
- Hot House, Domain Garden, Hobart 1829
- Store House, for the Van Diemen's Land Company 1843

=== Schools ===
- Infant School, Hobart 1833
- National Day School, Hobart 1835
- Orphan Schools, Hobart 1830
- Parsonage House, Hobart converted to school 1837
- Public School, New Norfolk 1828
- Richmond School House, 1834–35

== Gallery ==
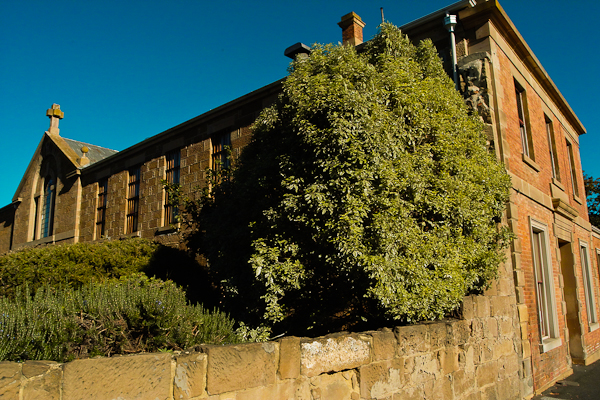
Campbell Street Gaol, completed in 1829.

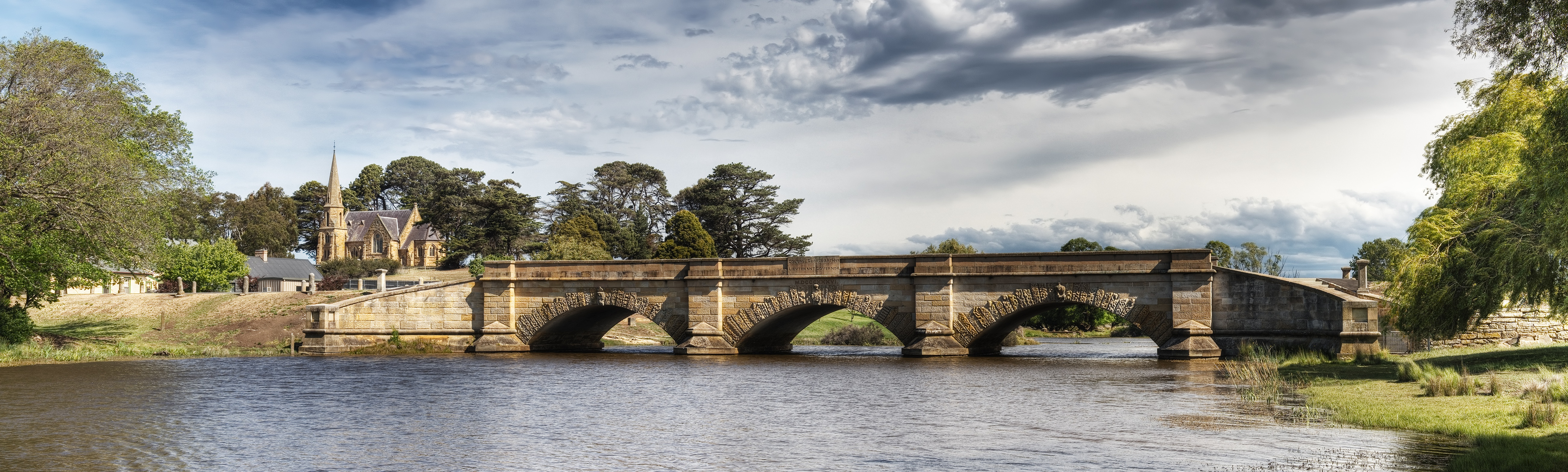
Ross Bridge over the Macquarie River, completed between 1831 and 1836.

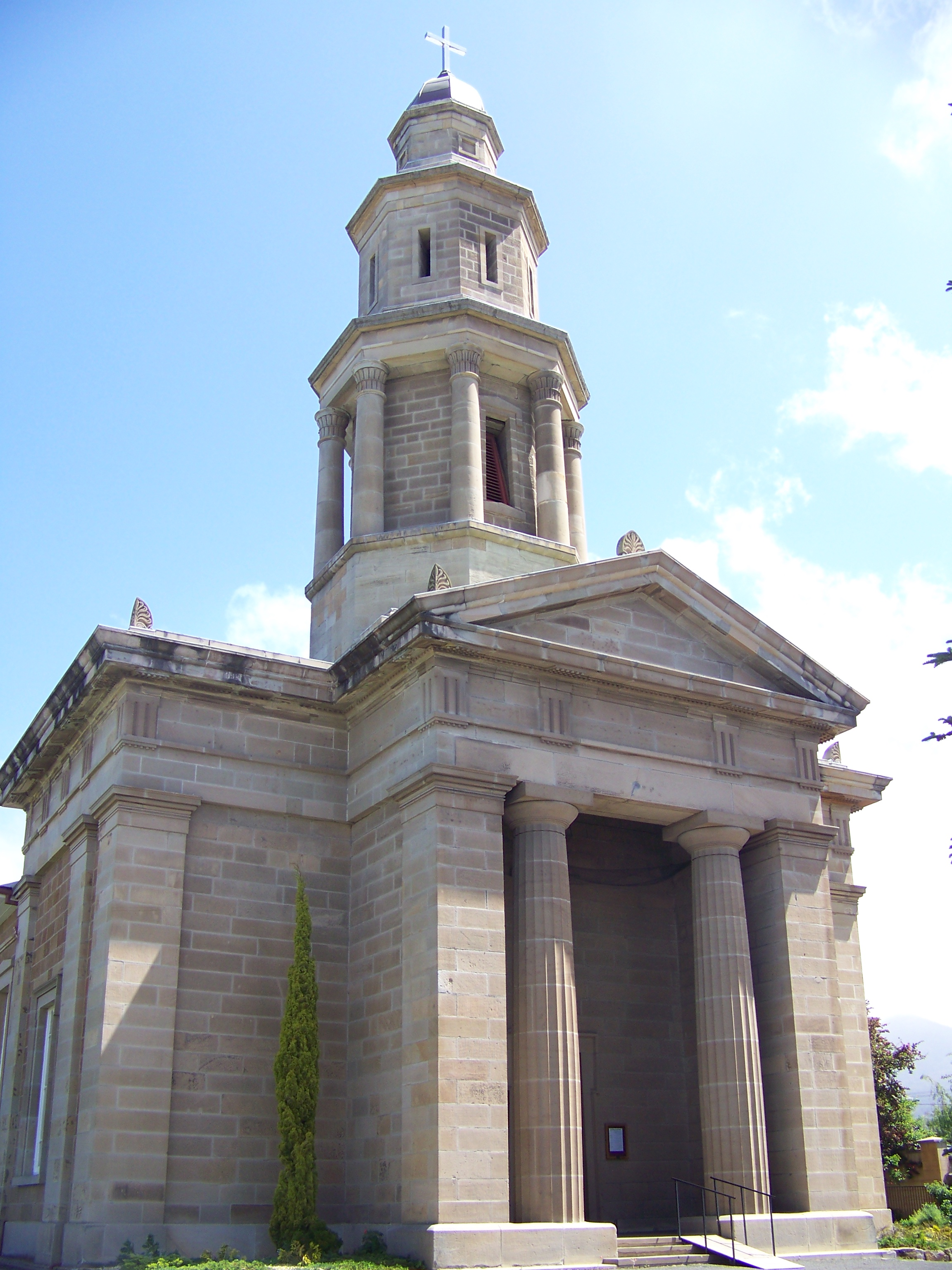
St George's Anglican Church, Battery Point, completed between 1836 and 1838.

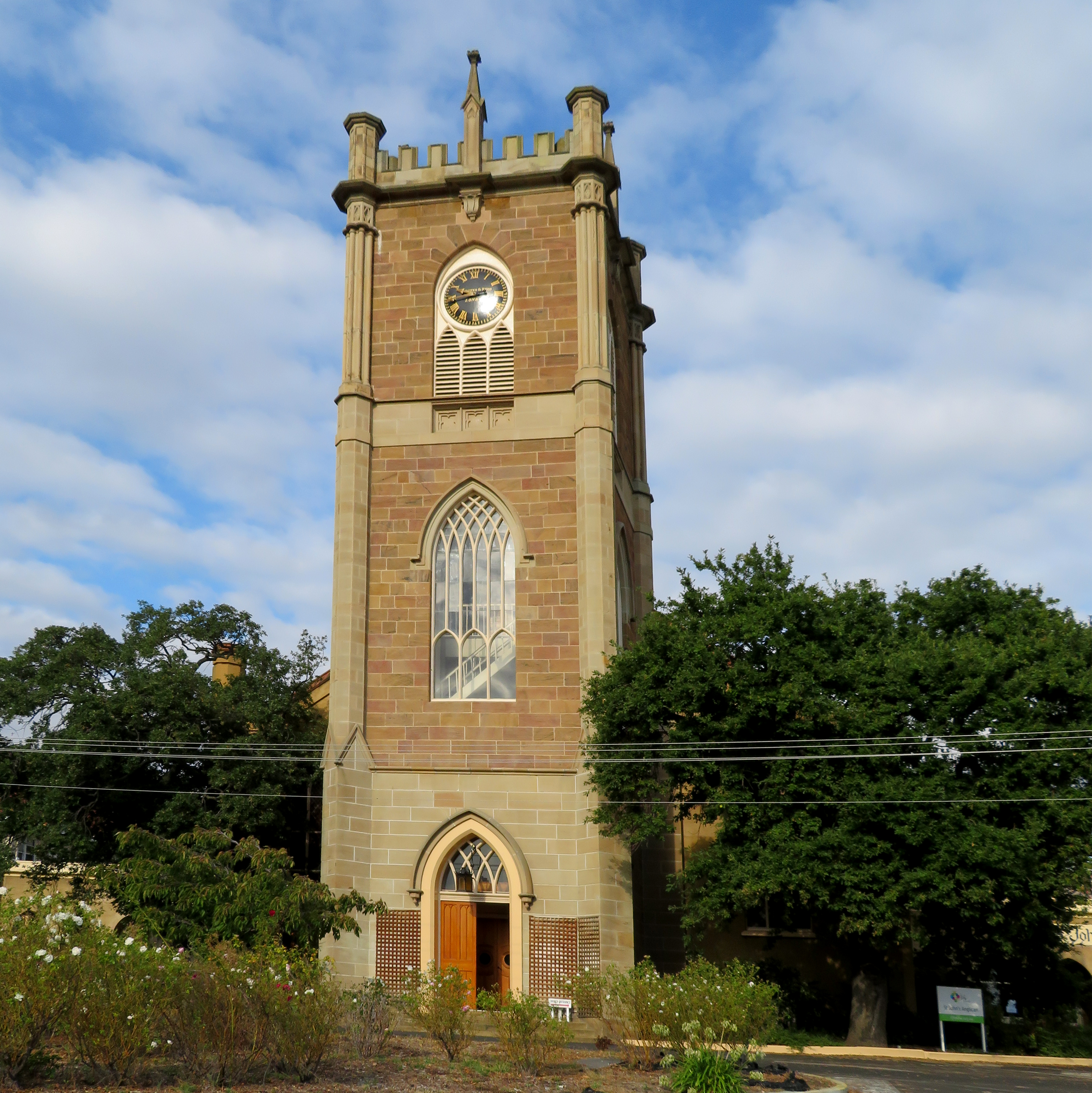
St John's Anglican Church, New Town, Tasmania, completed between 1830 and 1835.

== See also ==
- Circular Head, Tasmania

== Bibliography ==
- Smith, Roy (1962). John Lee Archer, Tasmanian Architect and Engineer. Hobart: Tasmanian Historical Research Association.
- Herman, Morton (1954). The Early Australian Architects and their Work. Sydney: Angus and Robertson. ISBN 0-207-12065-X.
- Robertson, Grahame E. (1970). Early Buildings of Southern Tasmania' Vol.1. Adelaide: The Griffin Press. ISBN 0-85585-468-5.
- Priceless Heritage (2nd ed.). Hobart: The National Trust of Australia (Tasmanian branch) Platypus Publications. 1964.
