= Long Room (disambiguation) =

The Long Room is at Lord's cricket ground, London.

Long Room may also refer to:

- The main chamber of the Old Library in Trinity College Library, Dublin, Ireland
- A section of Immigration Museum, Melbourne, Australia
- A former name of the Members' Lounge at Parliament House, Hobart, Tasmania, Australia
