= Peacock Theatre (disambiguation) =

The Peacock Theatre is a theatre in the West End of London, England.

Peacock Theatre or Peacock Theater may also refer to:

- Peacock Theater, a music venue in Los Angeles, California, US
- Peacock Theatre, Dublin, a theatre in Dublin, Ireland
- Peacock Theatre, Helsinki, a theatre in the Linnanmäki amusement park, Helsinki, Finland (also sometimes spelt Theater)
- Peacock Theatre, Hobart, a theatre in the Salamanca Arts Centre in Hobart, Australia
