= Parliament Square, Hobart =

Historic site in Tasmania, Australia

Parliament Square
- Artist's impression of the Parliament Square Development
- Interactive map of Parliament Square
- Type: Public space
- Location: Hobart, Australia
- Coordinates: 42.885005°S 147.330181°E
- Area: 7,322 m^{2} (78,810 ft^{2})
- Operator: Citta Property Group
- Status: Under construction

Parliament Square is a historic city block, located directly behind Parliament House in Hobart, Tasmania, Australia. It is presently under redevelopment, and upon completion will include Marriott International hotel, seven retail spaces, state government office building and plaza.

The block is bound by Davey Street to the north, Murray Street to the east, Salamanca Place to the west and Parliament House to the south. The block has an approximate area of 7,322 m^{2}.

== History ==
Parliament Square consists primarily of former government buildings, such as the former St Mary's hospital, the Red Brick Building, the Government Printing Office, Parliamentary annexes, two low-rise public service office buildings (including 10 Murray Street), and the former PABX building, containing the Tasmanian government phone switchboards. Over time, the state government used less of these buildings and by 2018, they were mostly unoccupied.

== Redevelopment ==
In April 2009 the Tasmanian Government shortlisted three proposals for the redevelopment of the area.

The Government announced Citta Property Group as the preferred company to undertake the project. Citta planned to give the area a Federation Square feel with the demolition of the State Offices at 10 Murray Street and the opening up of the Murray Street side. The plan included upgrading and maintaining the older Davey Street facing buildings, as well as building a new seven-storey building facing Salamanca Place. There were also plans for shops, cafes and an amphitheatre with a large screen for public events.

Of the three shortlisted proposals, one design would have retained and retrofitted the modernist building at 10 Murray Street, whilst the two other plans required demolition of the building.

== Controversies ==
The redevelopment has been the topic of several controversies. From the announcement of the project, heritage concerns were raised by a number of groups, including the Art Deco and Modernism Society of Australia and Save 10 Murray, who wished to conserve 10 Murray St, a modernist/brutalist office building, and the art deco Government Printing Office. The Resource and Planning Tribunal ruled that construction must cease in 2010 after a heritage appeal by the group. This was reversed in December 2010, and a Supreme Court appeal was submitted In 2012, the state government attempted to pass a bill that would extraordinarily exempt the project from Tasmania's planning, heritage and appeal laws. The Planning Institute of Tasmania and Tasmanian Greens called for the bill to be immediately dismissed. Further plans to demolish the art deco former Printing Office were overturned in 2012 by the Supreme Court, leading to its integration into hotel projects.

Construction began in 2013, but the site was formally transferred from the Tasmanian state government to CITTA for the price of $8.1 million in 2014. 10 Murray Street was demolished in 2018.

Fire broke out during construction in 2014. In 2016, a case was filed with Equal Opportunity Tasmania about the lack of a disability accessible lift on the north-east entrance to the site. It was dismissed on technically in 2019. From 2013 to 2016, a suit alleging that construction workers on the project had been exposed to asbestos was undergoing. Prosecution was withdrawn in 2016. The revelation that further asbestos rubble had been distributed to two schools for use in construction, led to the call for further regulation and temporary pause on construction work at Glenorchy Primary School.

Planning officers raised concerns about the addition of another story to government office buildings, but the changes were approved by Alderman in 2015. At the time, the hotel was expected to be complete in 2018. Last minute alterations to add an additional floor to the Marriot hotel were approved by Hobart City Council against the advice of planning officers in 2019. In 2019, parts fell from a crane during construction and narrowly missed a construction worker.
