= John Clemente =

Italian physician

John Faust Clemente
- Born: 1926; Bari, Italy
- Died: 2011 (aged 84–85)
- Education: University of Bari, University of Padua, University of Queensland
- Occupations: Physician, collector
- Known for: Contribution to Salamanca Market, collecting Tasmanian postal history
- Spouse: Ruth Greene

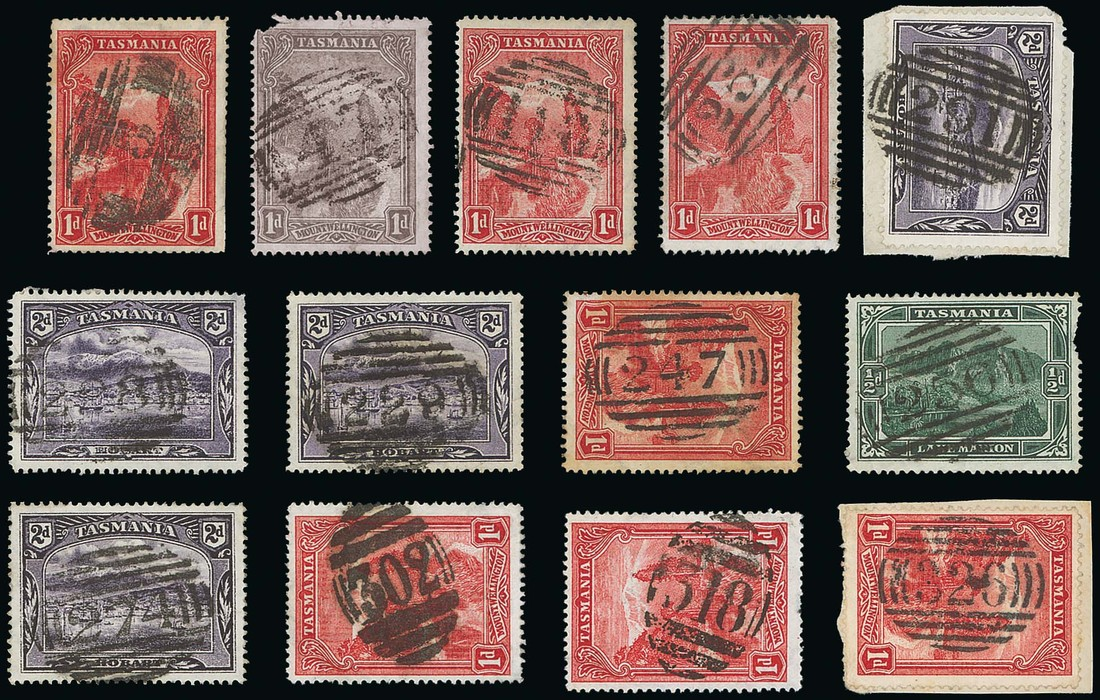
A collection of the second numeral cancellations of Tasmania, 1861–1900, from the John Clemente collection.

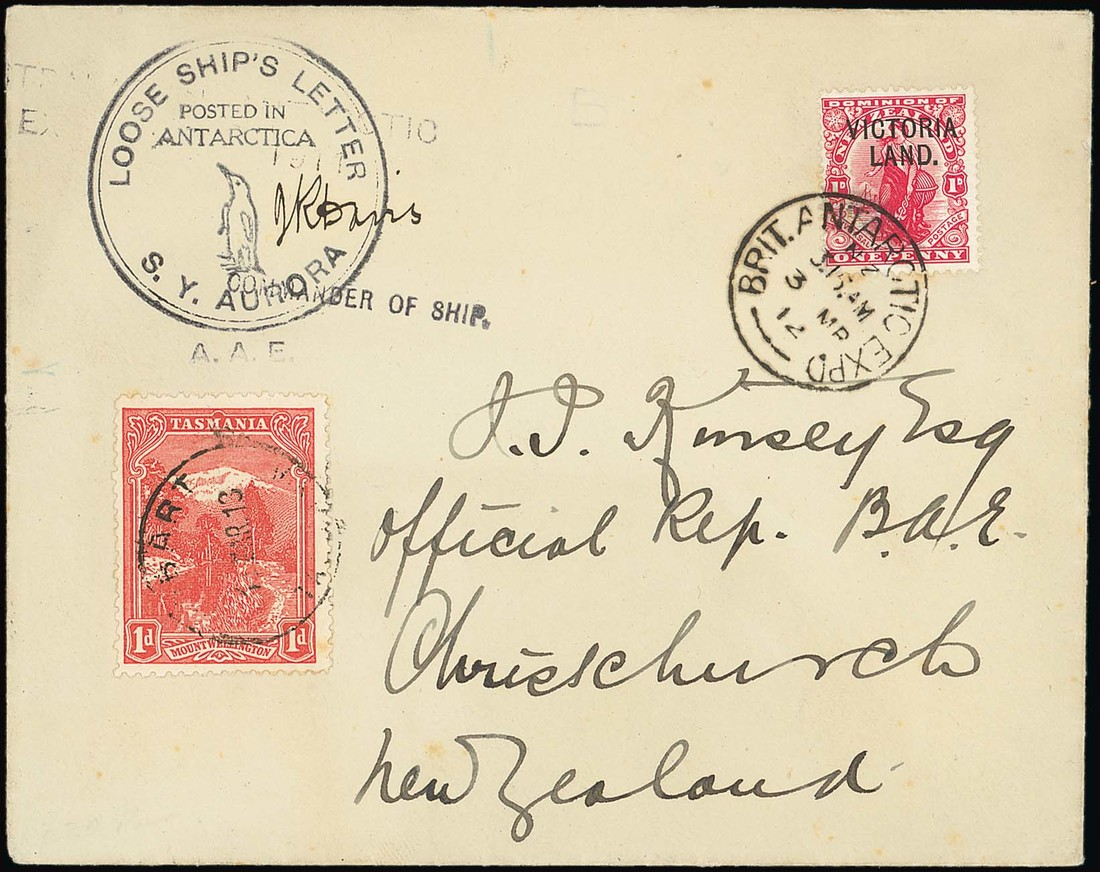
A 1912 cover from the SY Aurora of the British Antarctic Expedition to New Zealand postmarked Hobart. From the John Clemente collection.

John Faust Clemente (1926–2011) was an Italian physician whose career was in Tasmania, Australia, and who, as an alderman, was one of the main figures behind the creation of the Salamanca Market in Hobart in 1972. In his spare time, he collected art and antiques with his wife Ruth and formed a leading collection of Tasmanian postal history.

== Early life and family ==
John Faust Clemente was born in Bari, Italy, in 1926. He graduated in medicine and surgery from the universities of Bari and Padua in 1948. In 1949 he met the Australian, Ruth Greene, at Christ Church, Oxford, and they married the same year in London. They moved to Brisbane at the end of 1949 where Clemente re-qualified in medicine at the University of Queensland.

== Medical career ==
After qualifying in Queensland he obtained a post at Launceston General Hospital in Tasmania in 1951 and was subsequently Tasmanian government medical officer in Scottsdale and Cygnet. He moved to Hobart and private practice in 1955 where he bought an Italianate Victorian house on upper Davey Street which he named Coningsby after the novel by Benjamin Disraeli. He had rooms in Macquarie Street. He retired in 1989.

== Local affairs ==
Clemente was an alderman in Hobart from 1968 to 1976 and one of the prime forces behind the creation of the Salamanca Market in 1972. A commemorative plaque exists on the building where the Maldini Café Restaurant is located. Clemente was president of Hobart Juventus, the local association football team.

== Collecting ==
Clemente and his wife Ruth were keen collectors of antiques and art and made regular buying trips overseas, particularly to London, in the 1950s and 60s as well as buying locally. Ruth was particularly keen on antique tea caddies, fans, and writing boxes. They also acquired a great deal of silver. They brought their acquisitions back to their home and formed a large collection which was sold by Mossgreen Auctions in 2012 for over A$526,000.

Clemente was a stamp collector from childhood, collecting Australian and Italian stamps. In Tasmania as an adult, he travelled the island seeking out caches of forgotten items for his collection of Tasmanian postal history and made detailed studies of postmarks and printing flaws on Tasmanian stamps.

He wrote articles for The London Philatelist, the journal of the Royal Philatelic Society London, of which he became a fellow, The American Philatelist, and for other journals. He became a member of the Collectors Club of New York. He wrote a book on the free mail of Van Diemen's Land and Tasmania which is scheduled for publication in 2016.

== Death and legacy ==
John Clemente died in 2011. His collection of Tasmanian postal history was sold at auction by Spink in September 2016 in 536 lots.

== Selected publications ==
- "Posted at Macquarie Island" — The 1911 Mawson Expedition", The London Philatelist, Vol. 78, 1969, pp. 309–311.
- "Tasmanian crown seals", The London Philatelist, Vol. 79, 1970, pp. 130–135.
- "Tasmanian parcel post 1887–1912", The London Philatelist, Vol. 79, 1970, pp. 211–216.
