= Dirk Bolt =

Dutch-born architect (1930–2020)

- Born: 24 October 1930; Groningen, Netherlands
- Died: 13 December 2020 (aged 90); Aberfeldy, Perth and Kinross, Scotland
- Education: Delft University of Technology, Hobart Technical College, University of Auckland
- Occupation: Architect
- Awards: Sir Roy Grounds Award for Enduring Architecture, 2000, 2015 & 2024
- Buildings: Christ College, Hobart; Murray Street State Offices, Hobart; Burgmann College, Canberra; Bahr House, Canberra
- Projects: Torrens Neighbourhood Centre
- Scientific career
- Thesis: The development ratio: a model for a humane urban future (1983)

Dirk Bolt (24 October 1930 – 13 December 2020) was a Dutch-born architect who is best known for his post-Second World War Australian modernist architecture and his later career as an academic and consultant that applied sustainable, equitable and humane principles to town planning.

His most notable buildings include the Sandy Bay Campus buildings of Christ College at the University of Tasmania and the Murray Street State Offices in Central Hobart.

== Professional life and education ==
Bolt was born in Groningen on 24 October 1930.

He commenced his studies in architecture at the Delft University of Technology, but moved to Australia in 1951, and finished his qualifications as an architect and town planner at Hobart Technical College. He designed many innovative residential and commercial buildings in Hobart and Canberra. In Canberra, where he worked between 1964 and 1971, he also consulted to the National Capital Development Commission, providing advice on planning of the growing capital. The Australian Institute of Architects (ACT) is in the process of publishing a monograph on his architectural and town planning work in Canberra.

In the 1970s, he worked for international development organisations in Africa and Asia, including the UN Office of Technical Cooperation. He consulted to many agencies and governments on planning, development and sustainability.

He was appointed senior lecturer in urban design at the University of Auckland, where he received a PhD in town planning in 1984. His doctoral thesis, titled The development ratio: a model for a humane urban future, was concerned with sustainable, equitable and humane town planning. This is also reflected in his later work that included low-energy aspects of planning, providing tools for planning in mega-cities in developing countries, and affordable residential modular construction using timber. In 1987, he returned to the Netherlands and later became professor and head of urban planning at the University of Twente.

Bolt was an honorary fellow of the Australian Institute of Landscape Architects and past president of the ACT division of the Australian Planning Institute. In his later years, he lived in Scotland, and died in Aberfeldy on 13 December 2020.

== Notable buildings ==
Christ College, University of Tasmania

=== Christ College, University of Tasmania (1961–1962) ===
Commissioned to accommodate the relocation of the University of Tasmania to Sandy Bay, Christ College was the first residential college to be completed on the new campus. It could be regarded as a good example of Tasmanian modernist architecture, and in its style similar to Säynätsalo Town Hall designed by Alvar Aalto. Situated on a steep slope, "Bolt created a virtual hill town of visually different buildings grouped around a garden court" using materials that were designed to mature with time, such as natural concrete blocks and untreated timber. The building received the Australian Institute of Architects 2011 Enduring Architecture Award (Tasmania).

=== Murray Street State Offices, Hobart (1966–1969) ===
Completed in 1969, 10 Murray Street, as the Hobart building is commonly known, has been described as a unique example of Australian Brutalist architecture that was common in the 1960s. It is a multi-storey office building with an external reinforced concrete frame and recessed windows. Recently earmarked for demolition, a petition was started to save the building and to consider refurbishment.

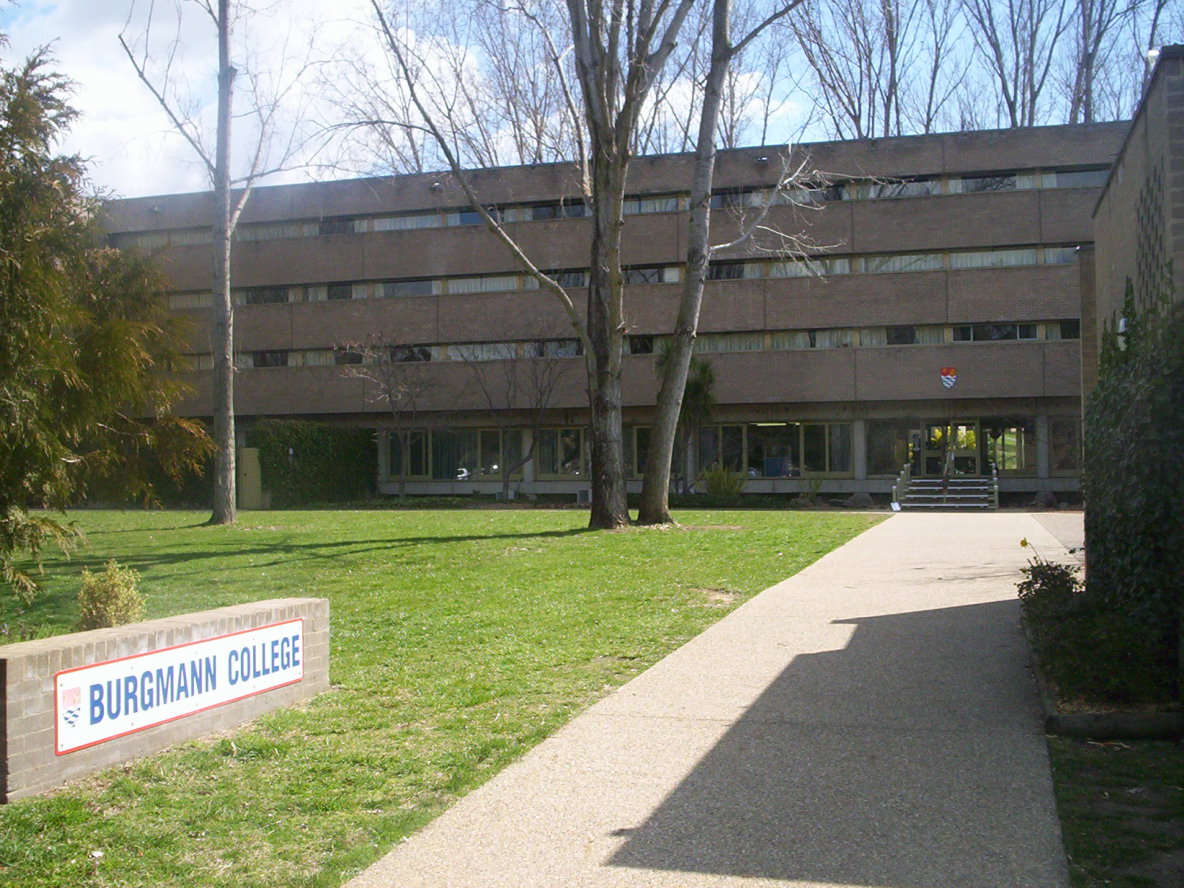
Burgmann College, Australian National University

=== Burgmann College, Australian National University, Canberra (1970–1971) ===
Given the success of the Christ College buildings at Sandy Bay, Dirk Bolt was commissioned to design Burgmann College, a residential mixed-sex college at the Australian National University. Even though originally intended to consist of four wings around a central courtyard with attached service buildings, only two wings were completed to form an L-shape building. The college building could be regarded as a Japanese inspired design combined with Dutch pragmatism using sliding doors and windows similar to shōji screens, recessed horizontal fenestration, and a restricted palette of materials.
