= Briony Kidd =

Australian director

- Occupation: Film director
- Years active: 2000–present

Briony Kidd is an Australian director based in Hobart, Tasmania. She has a Bachelor of Film and TV from the Victorian College of the Arts, Melbourne.

== Career ==
Kidd's film, The Room at the Top of the Stairs, was selected to screen at the 2011 HollyShorts Film Festival in Los Angeles, and for the touring Viscera Film Festival and the Pittsburgh Horror Film Festival.

In 2014, Kidd was a part of the production company, Van Demon Dames. The group's first project was to film a trilogy of short horror films, including Kidd's Watch Me.

=== Writing and theatre ===
Kidd reviewed films for The Jakarta Post from 2004 to 2008.

In 2010, Kidd's article in the Mercury urged film-goers to support Australian-made movies, citing the example of Sean Byrne's The Loved Ones struggling with the timing of its release and small distribution.

Her play, Death by Television, featured in the 2011 Tasmanian Theatre Company's Festival of New Tasmanian Theatre.

In 2015, she co-produced a podcast series about contemporary art in Tasmania.

In 2015, Kidd wrote The Pit, the first horror-themed performance for the Radio Gothic collective. She directed two further performances in 2017.

In 2016, she wrote for the Guardian about the visibility of the aesthetic of the Tasmanian gothic, and how this links with the Stranger With My Face festival.

Kidd has written articles for SBS in July 2015 about gender inequalities in the film industry; in June 2016 on Studio Ghibli's decision to not recruit female directors; and in August 2018 on director Matthew Newton's redemption arc.

== Filmography ==
| Year | Title | Role |
|---|---|---|
| 2000 | Meeting Shark | |
| 2002 | Learning the ropes | Director |
| 2003 | Starring Xavier | Executive producer |
| 2006 | Sam and Piccolo | Writer |
| 2010 | The Room at the Top of the Stairs | Writer |
| 2015 | I Am Undone | Producer |
| 2015 | A Night of Horror Volume 1 | Producer |
| 2015 | Grillz | Co-producer |
| 2016 | Watch Me | Producer, director, editor |
| 2016 | The Motel At The End Of The World | Co-producer, director, writer |

== Award nominations and funding ==
Kidd has received funding from Screen Tasmania in 2001, 2003, 2004, 2009, 2011, 2014, and 2016.

In 2015, Kidd received funding from Screen Australia through the Gender Matters - Brilliant Stories initiative, towards The Motel At The End Of The World. For the same film, she received mentorship through Screen Tasmania's Pitch, Plot and Produce cultural program.

== Activism ==
In October 2009, Kidd began a petition and Facebook page campaign to save the State Government Offices building, known as 10 Murray Street, Hobart. The 1966 building was scheduled for demolition to allow for development for Parliament Square. The group fought against the planning decisions on the basis that the building has cultural and architectural significance. As part of the advocacy, Kidd organised an art exhibition, Please Don't Let Me Be Misunderstood, within the National Trust's Heritage Festival. She continued as spokesperson for the 500 member 'Save 10 Murray' group, who appealed against the altered plans in July 2010. After Tasmania's Planning Tribunal gave final approval for the redevelopment in December 2011, Kidd said that it implied that heritage listing didn't mean very much, and that the legal case had repercussions for other listed buildings in Tasmania. Kidd was listed as number 9 in Tasmania's Top 10 2012 Movers & Shakers for her work as group spokesperson and in changing public opinion about heritage values.

Inspired by Viscera Film Festival, Kidd and Rebecca Thomson co-founded the Hobart-based Stranger With My Face International film festival in 2012. The festival focuses on horror films directed by women. In an interview with Jason Di Rosso on ABC radio national, Kidd discussed how the festival counteracts a male focus in the genre. In 2013, the festival was voted in the Top 5 Coolest Women's Film Festivals by Movie Maker Magazine readers. The festival website states that the event may return in late 2018 or early 2019, depending on funding.

In November 2013, Kidd wrote an opinion piece for the Guardian about the challenges involved in decriminalising abortion in Tasmania.
