= Battery Point =

- Suburb
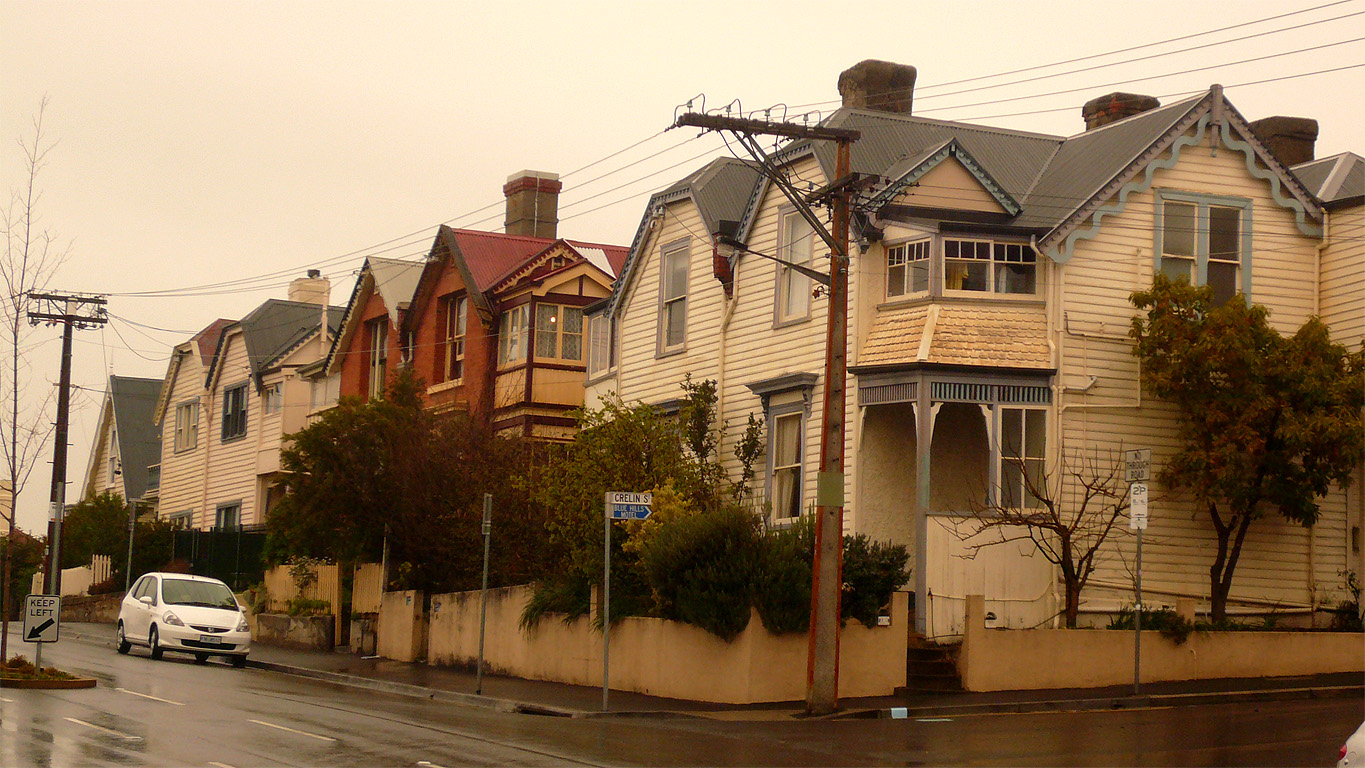
- An assortment of weatherboard and brick row houses in Battery Point

- Interactive map of Battery Point
- Coordinates: 42°53′34″S 147°20′0″E
- Country: Australia
- State: Tasmania
- City: Hobart
- LGA: City of Hobart

Government
  - State electorate: Clark
  - Federal division: Clark

Area
  - Total: 0.7 km^{2} (0.27 sq mi)

Population
  - Total: 2,096 (SAL 2021)
  - Density: 2,995.7/km^{2} (7,759/sq mi)
- Postcode: 7004
Suburbs around Battery Point
West Hobart	Hobart	Salamanca
South Hobart	Battery Point	River Derwent
Dynnyrne	Sandy Bay	River Derwent

Battery Point (/ˈbætəripɔɪnt/; BAT-ə-ree-POINT) is a suburb of the city of Hobart, Tasmania, Australia. It is immediately south of the Hobart central business district. It is in the local government area of City of Hobart.

Battery Point is named after the battery of guns which were established on the point in 1818 as part of the Hobart coastal defences. The battery was situated on the site of today's Princes Park. The guns were used to fire salutes on ceremonial occasions but were never called upon to repel an invasion. The battery was decommissioned after an 1878 review of Hobart's defences found that its location would tend to draw an enemy's fire onto the surrounding residential neighbourhood. The site was subsequently handed over to the Hobart City Council as a place of recreation and amusement. When the council carried out works to beautify the park in 1934, they discovered tunnels which had served as a magazine for the original battery. In 1973, a green ban was placed by the Builders Labourers Federation to prevent destruction of certain buildings by developers.

The suburb is generally known for its well-preserved colonial-era character. Arthur Circus, a historic park surrounded by cottages with picket fences, is a prominent heritage feature. The cottages were originally constructed for garrison officers.

Battery Point is also considered one of the city's more prestigious suburbs, with many large and extravagant homes and apartment blocks. It adjoins the waterfront Salamanca precinct and the suburb of Sandy Bay and is accessible via Hampden Road.

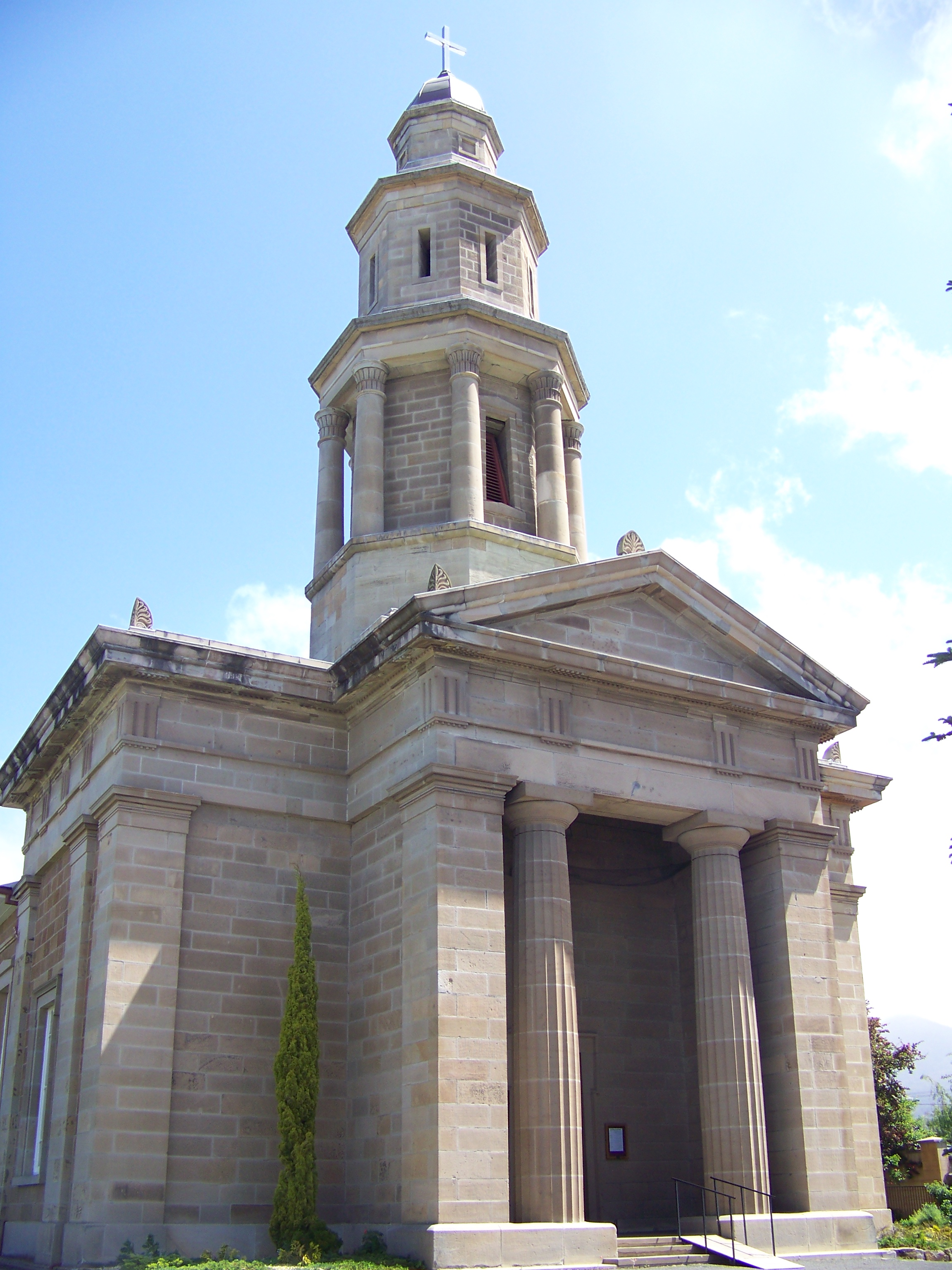
St George's Anglican Church in Battery Point, designed by John Lee Archer. Battery Point has a large number of historic houses dating from the first European settlement of "Hobart Town".

The hotel "Lenna of Hobart" on McGregor Street.

Battery Point residents have been the centre of controversy in recent years, demanding noise restrictions and other measures aimed at safeguarding a sheltered lifestyle.

== Population ==
In the 2016 Census, there were 1,997 people in Battery Point. 65.3% of people were born in Australia and 76.9% of people only spoke English at home. The most common responses for religion were No Religion 47.9% and Anglican 16.1%.

== Notable people ==
- Queen Mary of Denmark (born 1972), Queen Consort of Denmark, who was born in Battery Point at the Queen Alexandra Hospital
- William Buckley (1776 or 1780–1856), convict and Indigenous culture recorder, lived his last years in the Arthur Circus neighbourhood and was interred at the burial ground of St George's Anglican Church, Battery Point.
- Francis Butler (1856–1885), cricketer
- Errol Flynn (1909–1959), Hollywood film actor, who was born in Battery Point at the Queen Alexandra Hospital
- Andrew Inglis Clark (1848–1907), Tasmanian Supreme Court judge, barrister, engineer, politician and author of the Australian constitution
