= St George's Anglican Church, Battery Point =

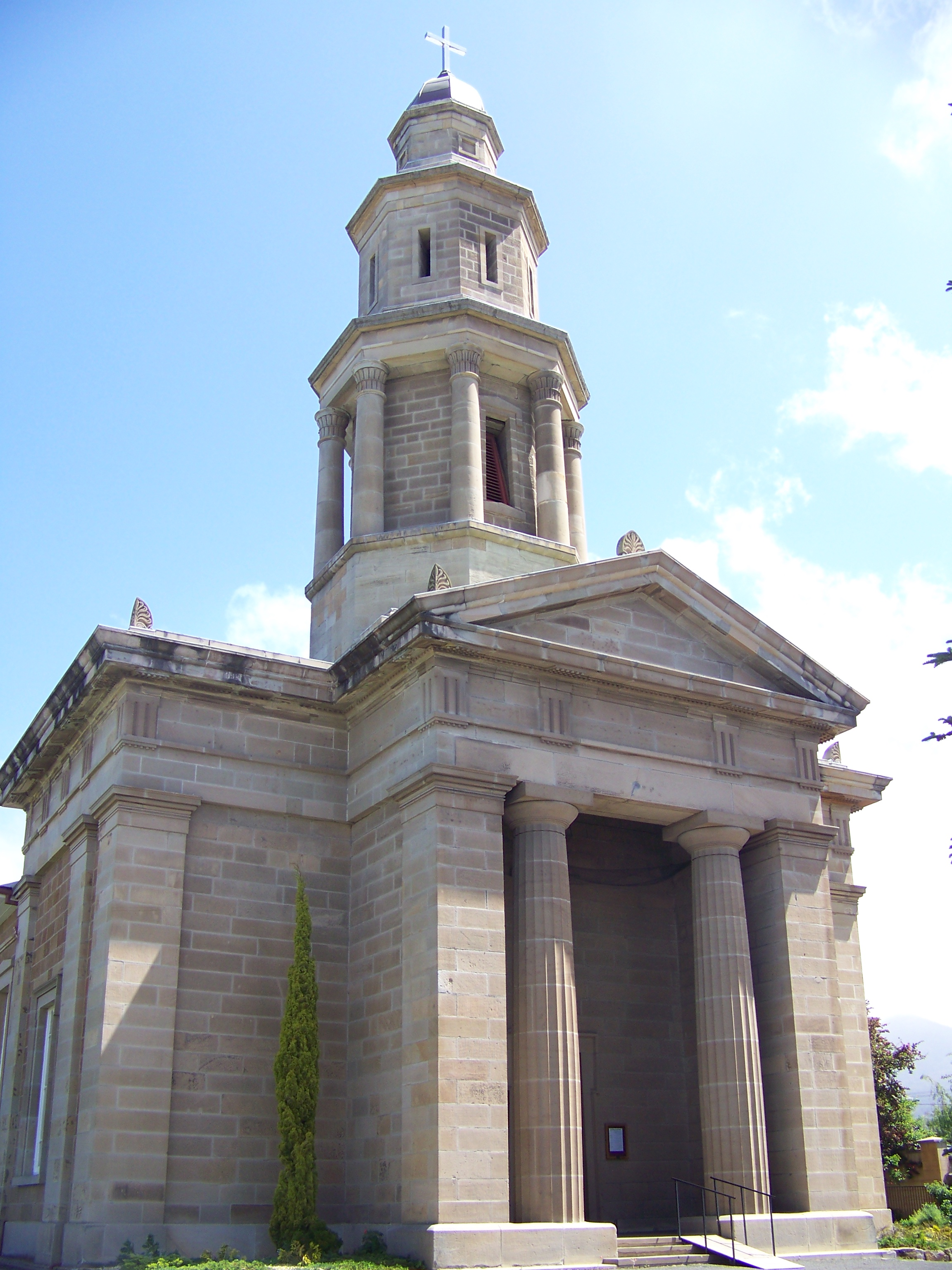
- St George's Anglican Church, Battery Point
- 42°53′29″S 147°19′55″E
- Location: Cromwell Street, Battery Point, Hobart, Tasmania
- Country: Australia
- Denomination: Anglican

History
- Status: Church

Architecture
- Functional status: Active
- Architects: John Lee Archer; James Blackburn

Specifications
- Materials: Sandstone

St George's Anglican Church is a parish of Anglican Church of Australia in the Diocese of Tasmania, located in Cromwell Street, Battery Point, Hobart, Tasmania. The historic parish church was designed by John Lee Archer in 1838, and is built of sandstone. The church's bell tower and portico designed by James Blackburn were added later. The tower served as a landmark to guide navigation on the estuarine part of the River Derwent.

== See also ==
- Anglican Church of Australia
