= Parliament House, Hobart =

House of parliament for Tasmania, Australia

Parliament House
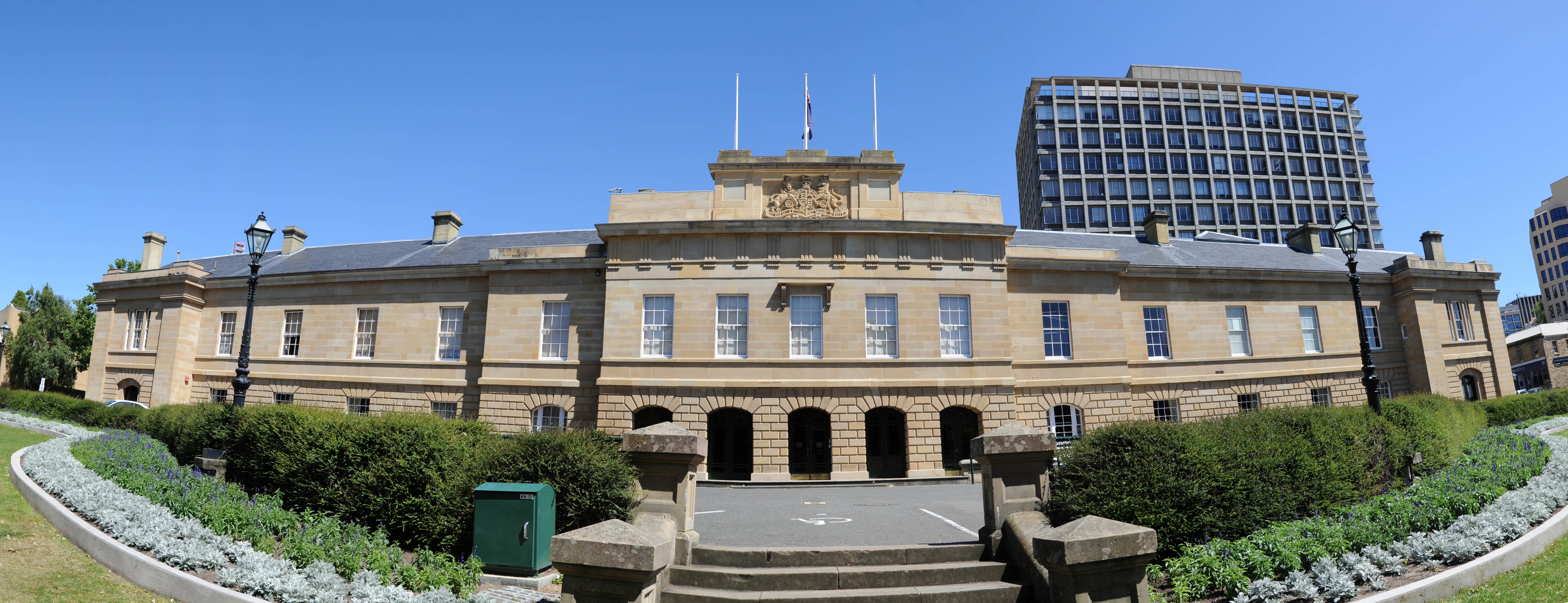
- Panoramic View of Hobart Parliament House from the front steps

General information
- Architectural style: Colonial Georgian architecture
- Location: Hobart, Tasmania, Australia
- Coordinates: 42.885449°S 147.330362°E
- Construction started: 5 January 1835; 191 years ago
- Completed: 1 September 1840; 186 years ago
- Client: Parliament of Tasmania

Design and construction
- Architect: John Lee Archer

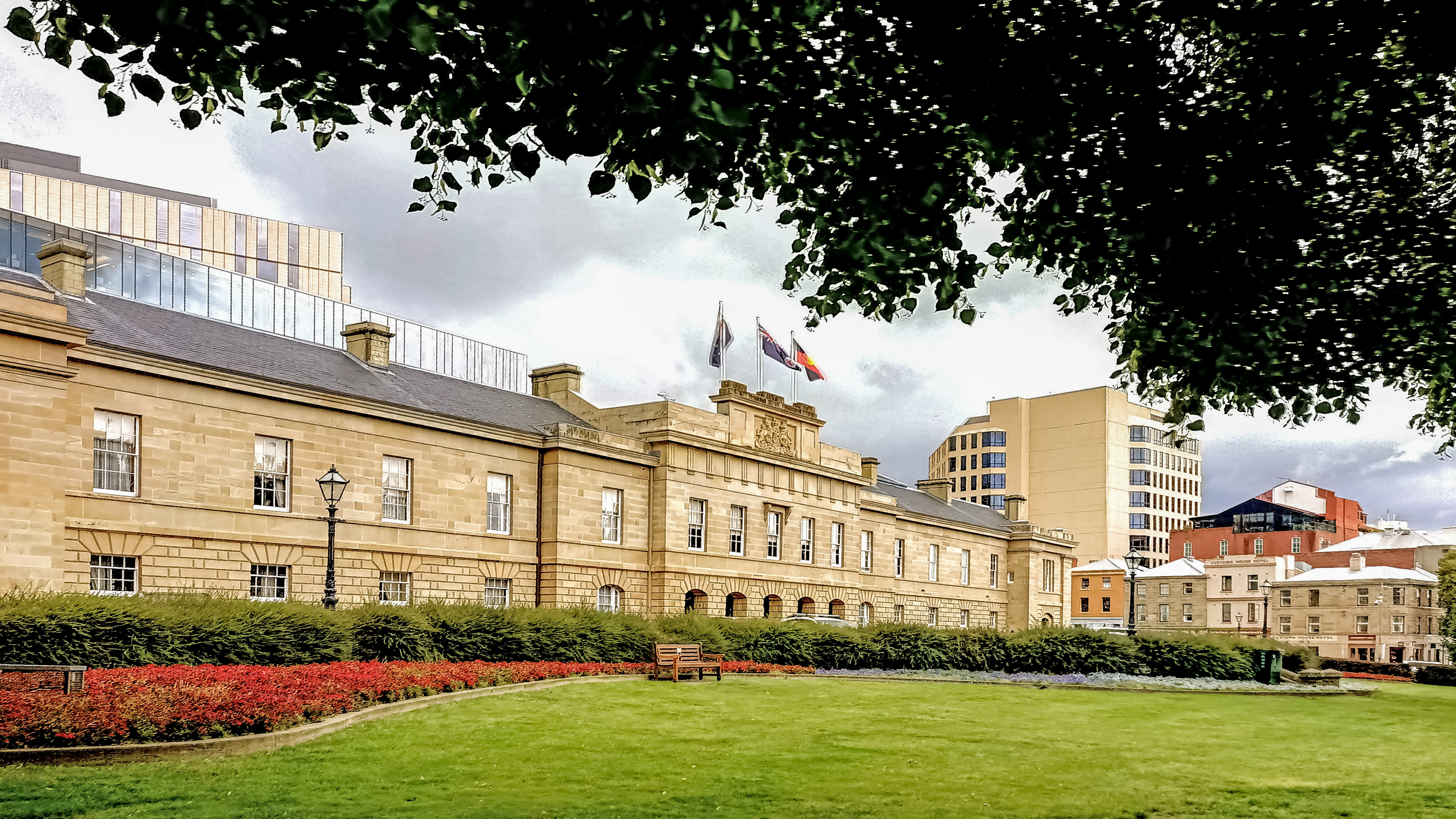
Parliament building in 2021, with the Customs House Hotel visible to the right

Parliament House, Hobart, located on Salamanca Place in Hobart, Tasmania, Australia, is the meeting place of the Parliament of Tasmania. The building was originally designed as a customs house but changed use in 1841 when Tasmania achieved self-government. The building served both purposes from 1841 to 1904, when the customs offices were relocated.

== History ==
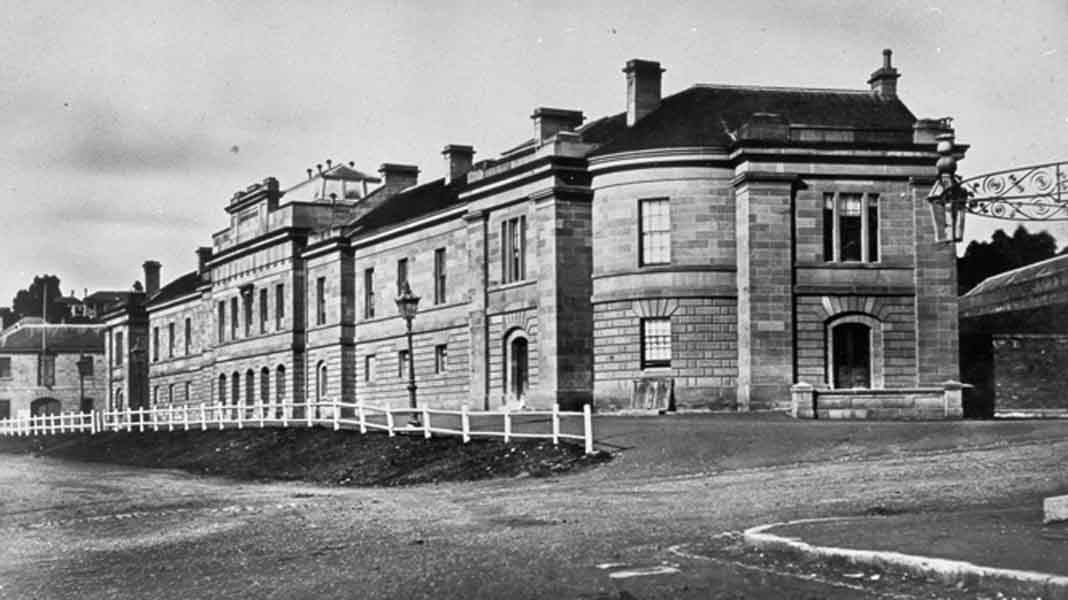
A photograph of Parliament House in 1869.

The island of Tasmania (then known as Van Diemen's Land) was claimed and subsequently settled by Great Britain in 1803. Initially, it was administered by the Governor of New South Wales, as part of that British Colony. In 1825 Tasmania became an independent British colony, administered separately from New South Wales, and the Legislative Council was formed as an appointed six man body to advise the Lieutenant Governor of Van Diemen's Land who had sole governance of the colony. The council initially held their meetings in a room adjacent to the old Government House that was located near to the present site of Franklin Square, but by 1841 they relocated their meetings to the 'Long Room' (now the Members' Lounge) in the Customs House.

The British Parliament enacted the Australian Constitutions Act 1850 (13 & 14 Vict. c. 59 (Imp)), which gave Van Diemen's Land the right to elect its first representative government. The size of the Legislative Council was increased from six to 24. Eight members were appointed by the Governor, and 16 were elected by property owners. The new Legislative Council met for the first time in 1852, and by 1854 they had passed the Tasmanian Constitution Act, granting Van Diemen's Land responsible self-government and a new bicameral parliament. In 1855 Queen Victoria granted Royal Assent and Van Diemen's Land became a self-governing British Colony. The following year, 1856, one of the new parliament's first acts was to change the name of the colony from Van Diemen's Land to Tasmania.

In April 1856 renovations began to the Customs House to allow it to accommodate the new bicameral parliament, and on 2 December 1856 the first sessions of parliament were held, with the new House of Assembly sitting in the Long Room, and the Legislative Council moved to their new chamber at the opposite end of the building.

The bicameral Tasmanian parliament continued to govern Tasmania as an independent colony until 1 January 1901 when Tasmania joined with five other Australian colonies, and federated to become parts of the new Commonwealth of Australia. The Tasmanian colonial parliament then became the Tasmanian State Parliament, and has since continued to take responsibility for internal domestic issues such as education, healthcare, and policing.

== Construction ==
Parliament House was originally designed as the Customs House in colonial Georgian architecture style by skilled colonial architect John Lee Archer in 1830. The site for the building had originally been a market, but had been converted into timber yards in the 1820s. The site was reserved in 1832 for the building of a customs house due to its close location to the wharves of Sullivans Cove (the building was originally closer to the water's edge than it is today following further reclamation).

Between 1832 and 1840 golden honey coloured sandstone was quarried from locations in the Queens Domain and Salamanca Place (now the site of Salamanca Square), and a small railway was constructed to ferry the blocks to the construction site. Construction began in on 5 January 1835, and using mostly convict labour, the basement level had been completed by March 1836. By 1838 the second story had been added and the building was ready for staff of the Customs Department to move into on 1 September 1840.

By 1841 the building was operating as the colony's customs house. At that time, the Legislative Council, which had been formed in 1825, were meeting in a room adjacent to the old Government House, but the location was less than adequate for such meetings. It was proposed that the meetings should be held in the spacious new 'Long Room' of the Customs House, and 19 June 1841, the first Legislative Council meeting was held within the building.

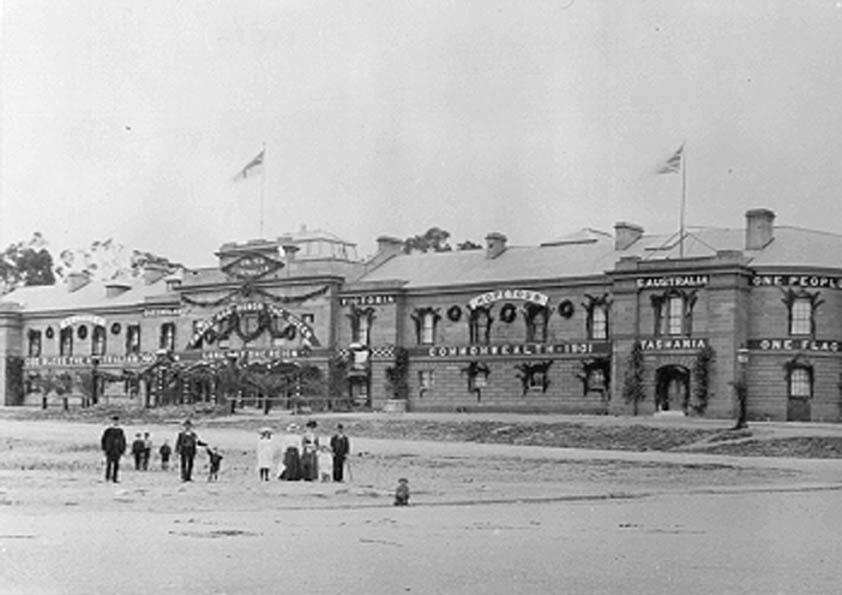
Parliament House decorated in 1901 for Australian Federation celebrations.

Following the establishment of responsible self-government in 1856, the building was renovated in April of that year in order to make provisions for housing the new bicameral parliament. The new House of Assembly met in the Long Room, where the Legislative Council had previously met, and the Legislative Council moved into a new ornate Chamber, where they still meet today.

The Customs Department finally moved out of the building altogether in 1904, moving to a new location in Davey Street next to the Tasmanian Museum and Art Gallery, leaving the building be solely occupied by the Parliament of Tasmania.

Between 1938 and 1940 Parliament House was again renovated to construct a new chamber for the House of Assembly, and convert the Long Room, where they had been meeting for the previous 82 years, into a Member's Lounge. The new House of Assembly Chamber was formally opened on 14 May 1940, whilst Tasmania was involved in Australia's World War II commitments. In December 1940 extensions were also added to the Legislative Council Chamber to create the Murray Street wing.

Further alterations were made to the building beginning in 1977. Member's offices, a Hansard office, Parliamentary Library and Museum, committee rooms, a dining room, reception area, interview rooms and other additional facilities were added, and a formal re-opening was held on 16 April 1980. The most recent alterations began in 1998 and are currently still underway (as of 2008), and are in the form of conservation work, and restoration of sections of the building to try and revert it to its original character.

The Royal coat of arms of the United Kingdom features prominently throughout Parliament House in stained-glass windows and engravings. This reflects Tasmania's former status as a British colony, and that the building was predominantly constructed during that time. Tasmania continued to utilise the Royal Arms on official documents until 1953, despite having adopted its own arms in 1919.

== Legislative Council ==
The Legislative Council is the Upper House, and debates bills that have been passed to it for review having been already approved by the House of Assembly. Once the Legislative Council also approves a bill, it becomes an act of parliament, and is given to the Governor of Tasmania for royal assent, by which it is made into a law.

The Legislative Council is the older body of the two parts of the Tasmanian Government. Having first met in 1825, it has continued to act as part of Tasmania's government ever since. Originally a six-man advisory group of members appointed by the Lieutenant Governor of Van Diemen's Land, it was expanded to 24 members (eight appointed, and 16 elected) in 1850, and was reduced to its current level of 15 members in 1856 upon the establishment of the current bicameral parliament. The Legislative Council is chaired by the President of the Tasmanian Legislative Council.

Elections to the Legislative Council are for six-year terms using a preferential voting system. The state is divided into 15 electoral divisions of the Legislative Council, with one member being elected from each electorate. The 15 members are referred to as 'Members of the Legislative Council' (MLCs). Electoral divisions for the Legislative Council are: Apsley, Derwent, Elwick, Hobart, Huon, Launceston, Mersey, Montgomery, Murchison, Nelson, Pembroke, Rosevears, Rumney, Western Tiers, Windermere.

The Legislative Council originally met in a side room of the old Government House. When Parliament House opened as the Customs House in 1840, the council moved their meetings to the Long Room, where they stayed until the bicameral parliament was established in 1856. That year a special Legislative Council chamber was constructed. The Chamber is plushly decorated with a red decor, seating and carpet, and cedar wooden paneling along the walls. The wooden paneling and ceiling is spectacularly hand-stenciled. The President sits on a large chair at one of the chamber, and members are seated in two rows along either wall, facing each other. Seats to the right side of the President are known as the 'President's Reserve', and to the left is the Press Gallery. There is also a public gallery by which citizens may observe the council in session. A Black Rod is present in the chamber as a symbol of royal authority for the Upper House. A large portrait of Queen Victoria by J. Prescott Knight RA, overlooks the chamber from a side wall, in honour of her granting responsible self-government to Tasmania.

Queen Elizabeth II, the Queen of Australia sat in the ornamental President's Chair, when she opened the Tasmania Parliament on 22 February 1954, the only occasion when the Tasmanian Parliament has been officially opened by its head of state.

== House of Assembly ==
The Tasmanian House of Assembly was established in 1856 as part of Tasmania's adoption of responsible self-government. Tasmania chose to adopt the same system of government as in the United Kingdom, with a bicameral parliament. Whereas the Legislative Council mirrored the House of Lords in the United Kingdom by having appointed members, the House of Assembly mirrored the House of Commons in being an entirely elected body. This meant that whilst the Legislative Council became the Upper House, the House of Assembly became the Lower House, where new bills were to be drafted and first debated, before being passed upwards to the Legislative Council. This system still operates today. Initially it consisted of 30 members from 24 electoral districts, with each district represented by one member, except Hobart which had five members, and Launceston which had two members.

Upon federation, the House of Assembly was reduced to 30 members. The 24 previous electoral districts were replaced with five new federal districts of Braddon, Bass, Franklin, Lyons and Denison. Tasmania is the only Australian state which uses its federal electorates for its state lower house. Each electorate elects seven members, creating the total of 35 members (since the passing of the Expansion of the House of Assembly Act 2022, which came into effect at the 2024 Tasmanian state election). Members are known as Members of the House of Assembly (MHAs). They are elected using the Hare-Clark system for a period of four years.

When it was first formed in 1856, the House of Assembly met in the Long Room, which had just been vacated by the Legislative Council. In 1940 the current House of Assembly Chamber was constructed, and features a green decor, seating and carpet, with blackwood wooden paneling around the walls. The Speaker of the Tasmanian House of Assembly sits on an elevated chair at one end of the Chamber, whilst all of the members sit in a horseshoe seating arrangement facing him. Three clerks sit in front of the Speaker. Traditionally, the Premier of Tasmania, and the party which has formed government sit to the right of the Speaker, and the opposition party sit at the opposite end of the horseshoe. A ceremonial mace of authority is to be found to the Speaker's side. There is a public gallery overlooking the chamber by which citizens may come and observe their government in session.

== See also ==
- Parliament Square

== Bibliography ==
- Parliament House - Parliamentary Library
- - Legislative Council
- - House of Assembly
- Parliaments at Work
