= Salamanca Market =

Weekly street market in Hobart, Tasmania

Coordinates: 42°53′12″S 147°19′55″E

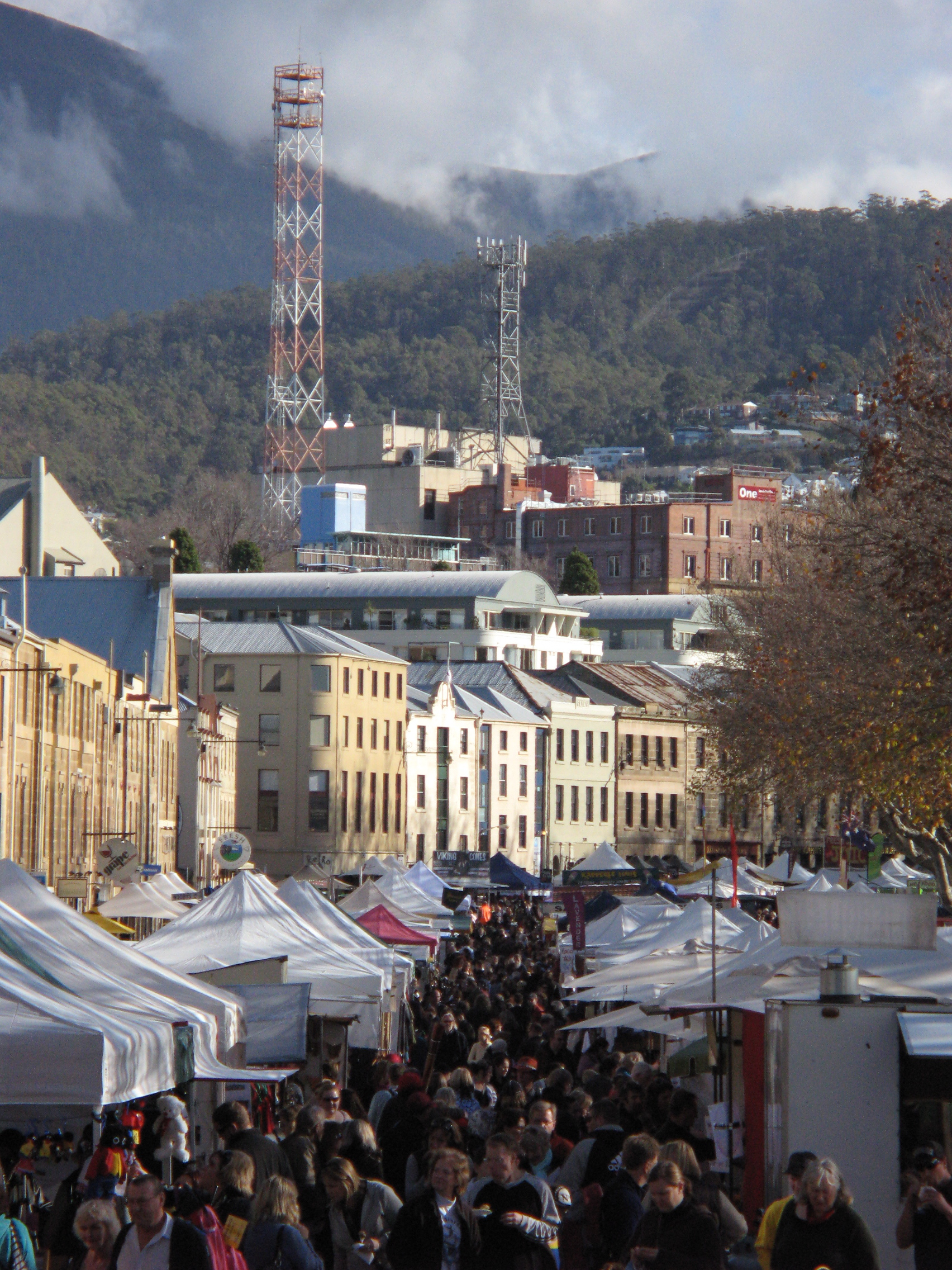
- Salamanca Market in 2008
- Genre: Fresh produce, local art, crafts and live performances
- Date: Every Saturday
- Begins: 8:30 am
- Ends: 3:00 pm
- Frequency: Weekly
- Locations: Salamanca Place, Hobart, Tasmania, Australia
- Years active: 54
- Inaugurated: 22 January 1972
- Participants: 350 stalls
- Website: Official website

Salamanca Market is a street market held every Saturday at Salamanca Place in Hobart, Tasmania, Australia. Since its inception in 1972, the market has grown to become the most visited tourist attraction in Tasmania, attracting over one million visitors per year.

== Overview ==
Located along Hobart's historic waterfront, the market stretches the length of Salamanca Place, flanked by Georgian sandstone warehouses that now house galleries, cafes and boutiques. The market features over 350 stalls offering a diverse range of locally made products, including hand-worked glass, Tasmanian timbers, bespoke jewellery, stylish clothing, organic produce, original artworks, ceramics, leather goods, handcrafted cheeses, breads, wines, spirits and a variety of hot foods.

The market attracts between 25,000 to 40,000 visitors each Saturday, and 800, 000 annually. It contributes up to $75 million to the local economy. It is owned and operated by the City of Hobart.

== Live music ==
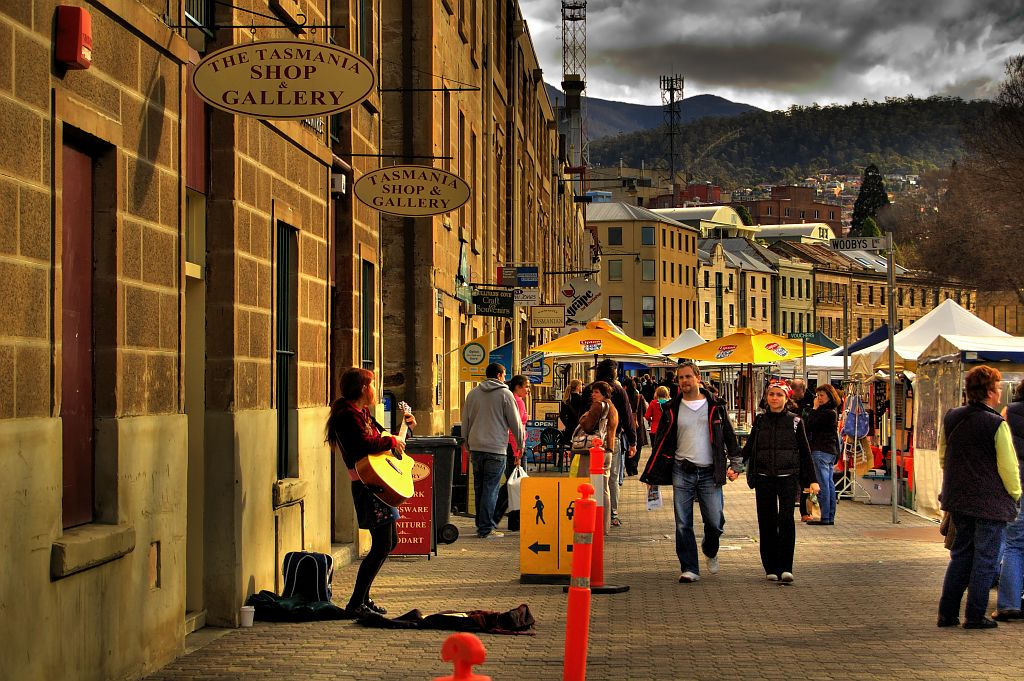
Busker at Salamanca Market, 2007

Between 1987 and 2014, Arauco Libre performed live at Salamanca Market every Saturday, playing traditional music from the Andean region of South America, including northern Chile, Argentina, Perú, Bolivia and Ecuador. Their repertoire included folk, traditional, dance and carnival tunes, performed with instruments such as the siku (pan pipes), quena (bamboo flute), bombo (drum), charango (ten-string mandolin/guitar) and chakj'chas (shakers). The band consisted largely of political refugees who fled the Pinochet regime in Chile and sought exile in Tasmania in the late 1980s. The band's name refers to the indigenous Araucanian people of southern Chile and Argentina, whose culture and language have been historically suppressed. Hence, the name served as a political statement – 'Freedom to the Araucanians'.

== History ==
=== 1970s ===
The concept of a community market in Salamanca Place was first proposed to Alderman John Clemente in 1971 by the National Council of Women Tasmania, led by President Grace Montgomery. The Hobart City Council approved a trial market on 28 June 1971, with the first market held on 6 November 1971, featuring six stalls run by the National Council of Women. Following the trial's success, the market officially launched on 22 January 1972, with 12 stalls beside the silos at the end of Salamanca Place.

Initially a seasonal event operating from four weeks before Christmas until Easter, the market's popularity led to the introduction of a winter market by the Tasmanian Puppet Theatre in 1975. By 1977, the Salamanca Arts Centre joined in organising the winter market. As the market grew, an informal stallholders' association was formed, chaired by Philip Broughton, leading to the introduction of permanent stallholder arrangements and site allocations.

=== 1980s ===
By the 1980s, the market had expanded to 150 stalls, covering much of Salamanca Place from the silos to Montpellier Retreat. The Salamanca Stallholders Association was formally established on 19 February 1987. Later that year, the Hobart City Council took over the winter market from the Arts Centre, and extended the summer market's hours from between 9:00 am and 1:00 pm to between 9:00 am and 2:00 pm.

=== 1990s ===
In 1992, the Southern Star reported weekly attendance figures of 10,000 to 12,000 people. The market expanded to Gladstone Street later that year, increasing opportunities for casual stallholders. By 1993, operating hours were further extended to between 9:00 am and 3:00 pm. In 1995, stalls were created in the car park near Montpellier Retreat for members of the Hmong community. The market was further extended to Davey Street in 1996.

In 1998–99, a feasibility study explored the introduction of a Sunday market at Salamanca Place. Three Sunday markets were trialled but met limited success and were opposed by the Salamanca Stallholders Association and the Sullivans Cove Merchants Association.

=== Since 2000 ===
Honey bees display in 2019

A series of Sunday markets were held in Mawson Place during January and February 2001. In 2009, the Hobart City Council established a subsidiary company to manage the market, with input from stallholders advocating for licensing agreement reforms. By 2010, Salamanca Market had grown to 300 stalls.

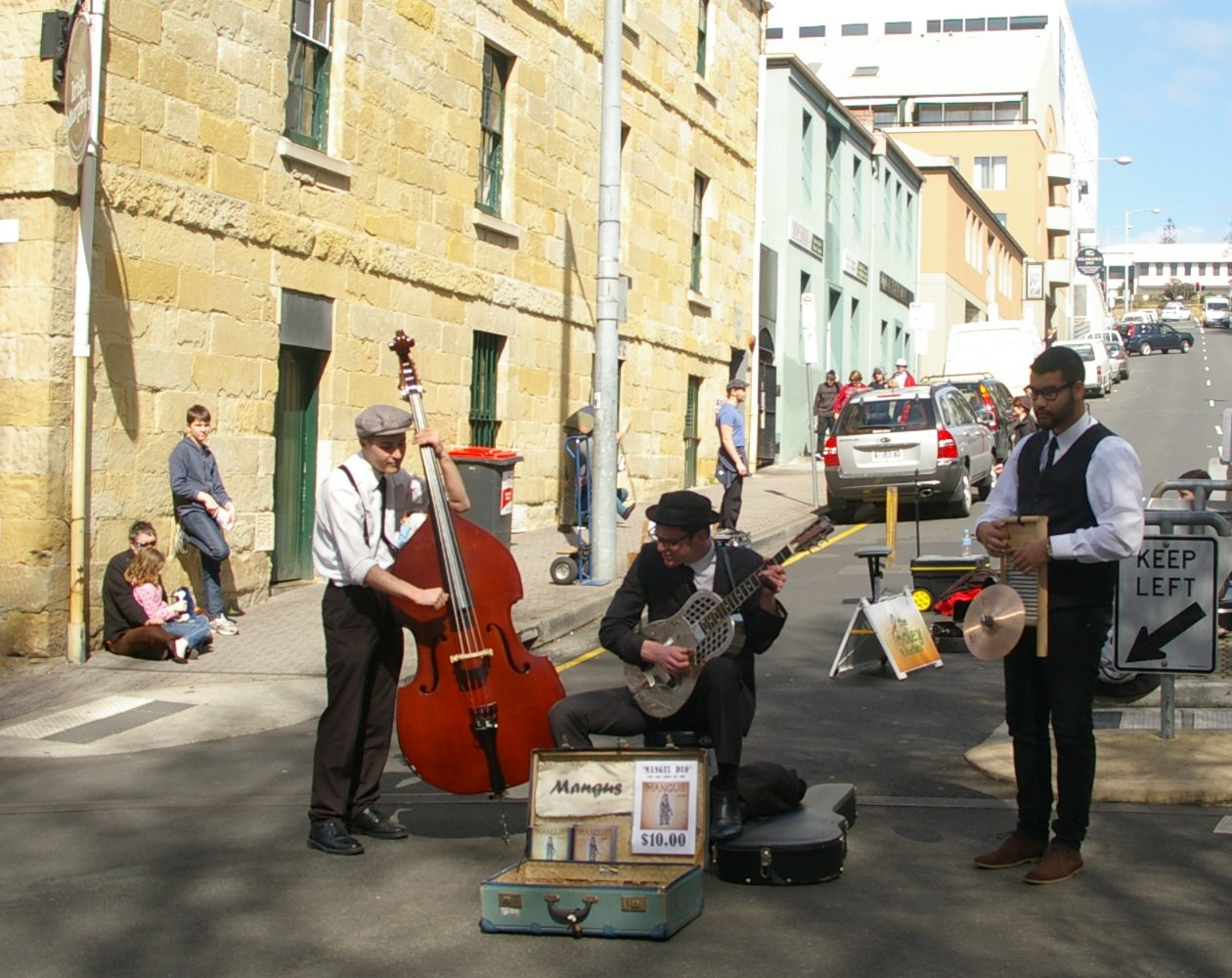
Buskers in 2012

In October 2024, the Hobart City Council faced public opposition over a proposal to remove London plane trees lining Salamanca Place to accommodate market expansion and pedestrian flow. Many residents and environmental groups expressed concerns about the potential loss of the trees' aesthetic and historical value.

== In popular culture ==
Salamanca Market appears in many books and films, including:

- Isham, Stephen E; Isham, Marion (1992), Bo Bandicoot at the market / Steve and Marion Isham, Bandicoot Books, ISBN 0646124080
- Lloyd, Bernard; Shelley, Samuel; Hobart (Tas.). Council (2014), Salamanca Market : a short history of a long market / written by Bernard Lloyd; photographer, Samuel Shelley, City of Hobart, ISBN 9780980710236
- Hansen, Alice, 1980-; Purnomo, Sabdo (2016), Tassie devils & marshmallows : backpack Jack and Bella's epic adventure / Alice Hansen; illustrations by Sabdo Purnomo, Alice Hansen, ISBN 9780980280074
- ""Last Drinks: Tasmania" Salamanca Market, Bonorong Wildlife Sanctuary & Franks Cider (TV Episode 2021)". IMDb. 14 April 2021.
- ""MasterChef Australia" Offsite Challenge: Salamanca Market (TV Episode 2012)". IMDb. 4 June 2012.
