= SS Salamanca =

A number of steamships have been named Salamanca, including:

- SS Salamanca (1906), a cargo ship in service 1906–07
- SS Salamanca (1943), a Hansa A Type cargo ship in service 1967–69
