= Salamanca Arts Centre =

Arts centre in Hobart, Australia

- SAC
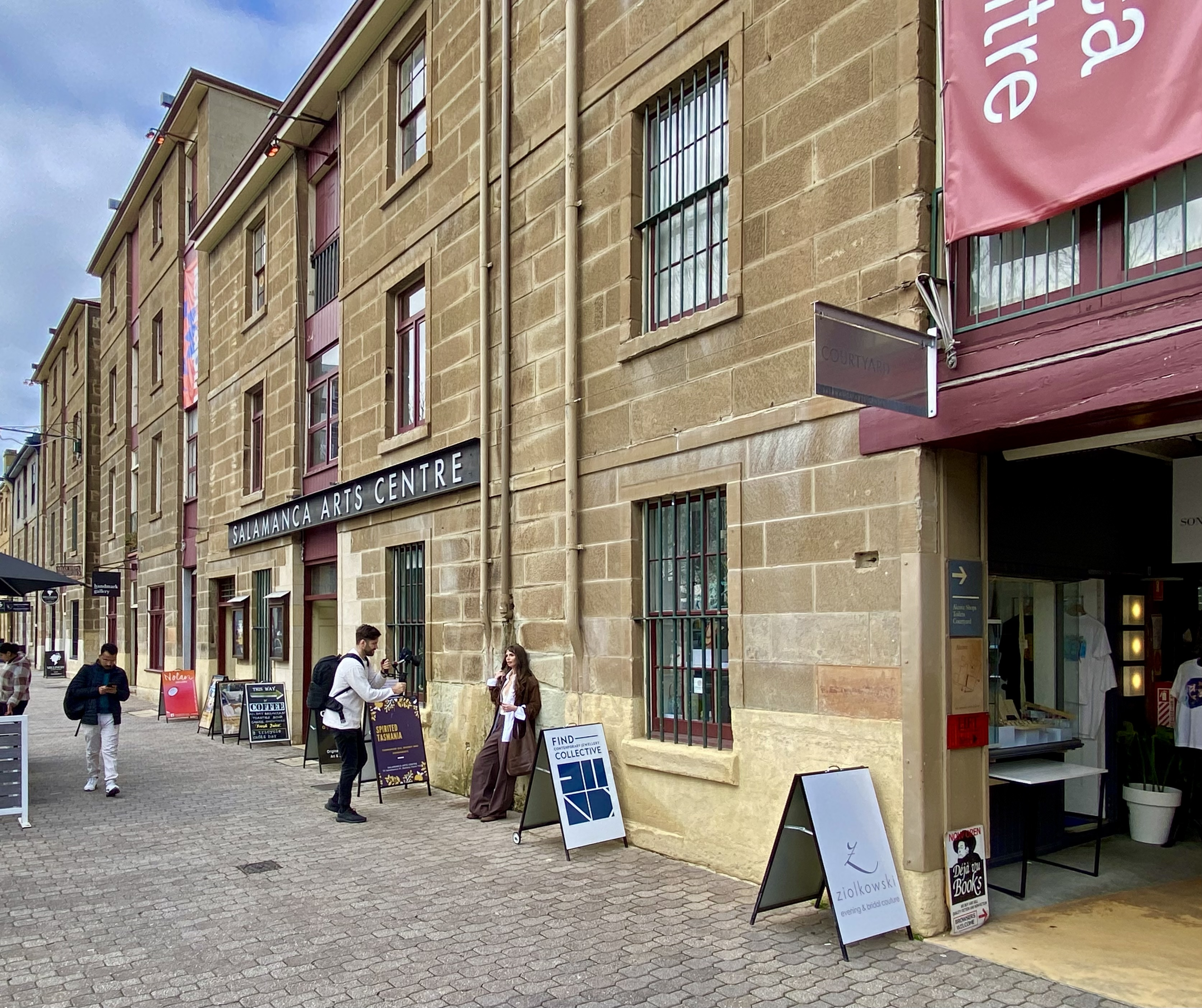
- Salamanca Arts Centre in Salamanca Place
- Interactive map of Salamanca Arts Centre
- Address: 77 Salamanca Place
- Location: Hobart, Tasmania, Australia
- Coordinates: 42°53′13″S 147°20′01″E
- Owner: Government of Tasmania
- Operator: Salamanca Arts Centre (Community and Arts Centre Foundation)
- Capacity: Various (Peacock Theatre, Long Gallery, Sidespace Gallery)
- Type: Multi-disciplinary arts centre, gallery, and venue complex

Construction
- Built: 1830s (original Georgian warehouses)
- Opened: 1976
- Renovated: 1974–1976 (conversion from jam factories to arts center)

Website
- www.salarts.org.au

The Salamanca Arts Centre (SAC), established in 1976, is a major arts hub and multi-disciplinary creative precinct in Hobart, Tasmania, Australia. Located behind the historic facade of 1830s Georgian sandstone warehouses in Salamanca Place, SAC houses various performing and visual arts venues, artist studios, administrative offices, and retail spaces.

== History ==
Following the decline and eventual collapse of the local jam manufacturing and industrial trade in the mid-20th century, the sandstone warehouses at Salamanca Place stood largely empty and derelict. In 1974, a group of local residents led by winemaker and arts advocate Claudio Alcorso (who also served as Chair of the Tasmanian Arts Advisory Board) envisioned converting the buildings into a dedicated community arts facility. The group established themselves as the Community and Arts Centre Foundation and included arts practitioners and advocates, including photographer Greg Hind. The Community and Arts Centre Foundation was then able to convince the Tasmanian Government under the Neilson ministry to purchase the warehouse complex, enabling the foundation's vision to come to fruition. Community volunteers subsequently cleared out decades of grime and industrial debris, repairing and repainting the spaces to make them usable for artists and performers. The Salamanca Arts Centre (SAC) officially opened in 1976 under a symbolic peppercorn lease from the State Government, with Alcorso serving as its first chairperson.

Over its history, SAC has served as a base for prominent individual artists, designers, craftspeople, collectives, and organisations. Notable residents and studio tenants have included cartoonist Jon Kudelka, musician Brian Ritchie (of the Violent Femmes), Czech-born printmaker Tom Samek, textile artist Helen Huxley, and Indigenous shell-necklace makers Lola Greeno and Jeanette James. It has also housed major Tasmanian cultural organisations, including the Terrapin Puppet Theatre (established at SAC in 1981), the Tasmanian Theatre Company, the Festival of Voices, and the Hammer & Hand metal sculpture collective.

== Venues and spaces ==
The complex consists of interconnected Georgian-era warehouses that spill into surrounding laneways, courtyards, and a cliffside cottage used for artist residencies. The physical property is owned by the Tasmanian Government, while the facility is managed by a nine-member governing board and an administrative team. SAC manages ten performing and visual arts venues. Key spaces within the complex include:

- The Peacock Theatre: A contemporary performing arts venue built directly into the foot of the stone quarry wall behind the warehouses.
- Long Gallery and Sidespace Gallery: Major exhibition spaces used for visual arts, media, and design exhibitions.
- Kelly's Garden: An outdoor space curated for site-specific public art and outdoor installations.

== Programs and initiatives ==
SAC hosts multi-disciplinary work across theatre, dance, puppetry, visual arts, film, craft, and music.

The centre was a founding venue partner in the national Mobile States contemporary performance touring consortium, alongside organisations such as Carriageworks (Performance Space), the Perth Institute of Contemporary Arts, Brisbane Powerhouse, and Arts House. SAC has also run dedicated artistic development initiatives, including HyPe (a hybrid performance laboratory) and SITUATE Art in Festivals, which mentors early-career and experimental practitioners to produce large-scale public art projects for national and international arts festivals.

SAC is supported by funding from the Tasmanian Government and the Hobart City Council.

== Gallery ==
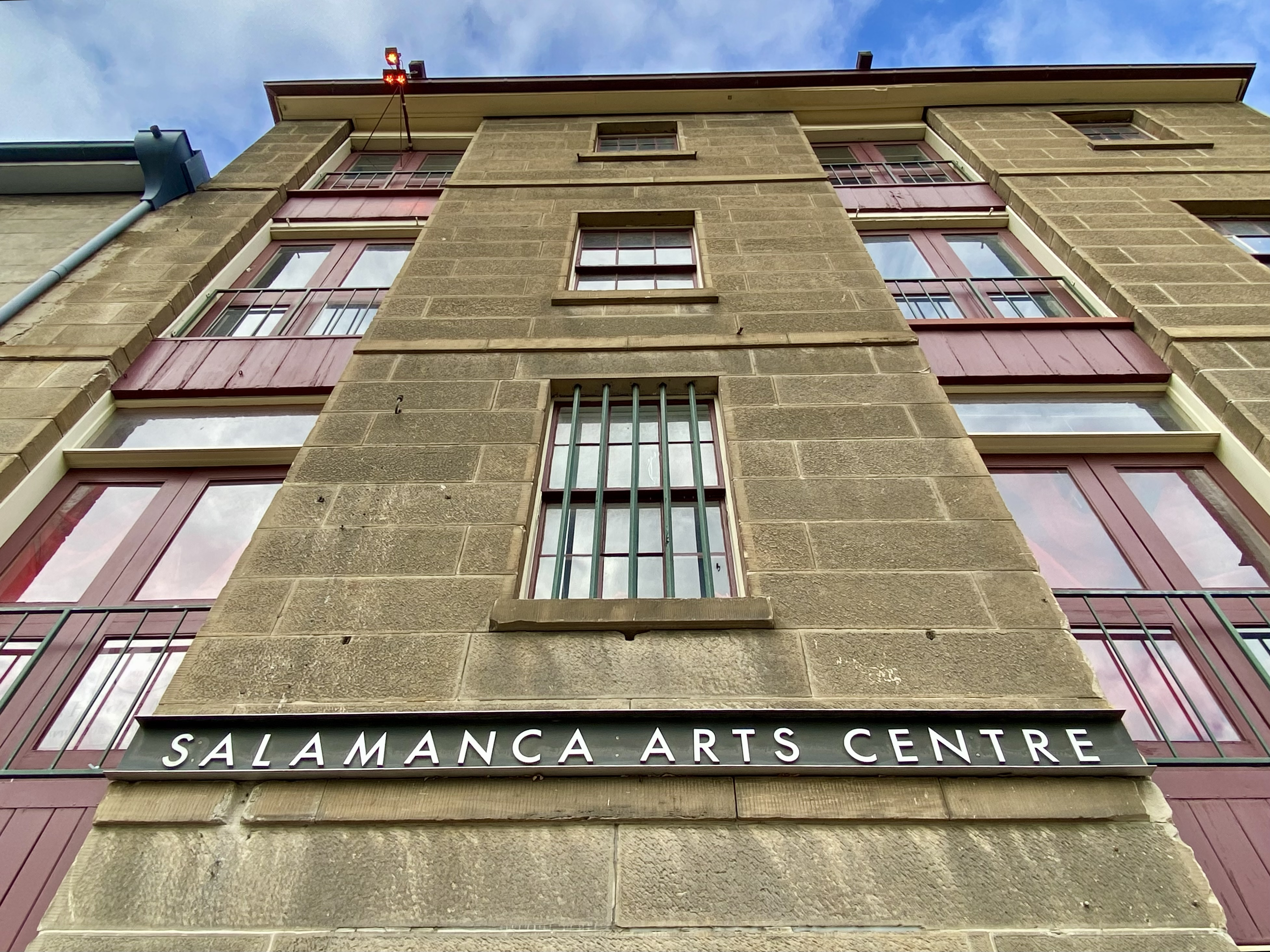
Salamanca Arts Centre signage.

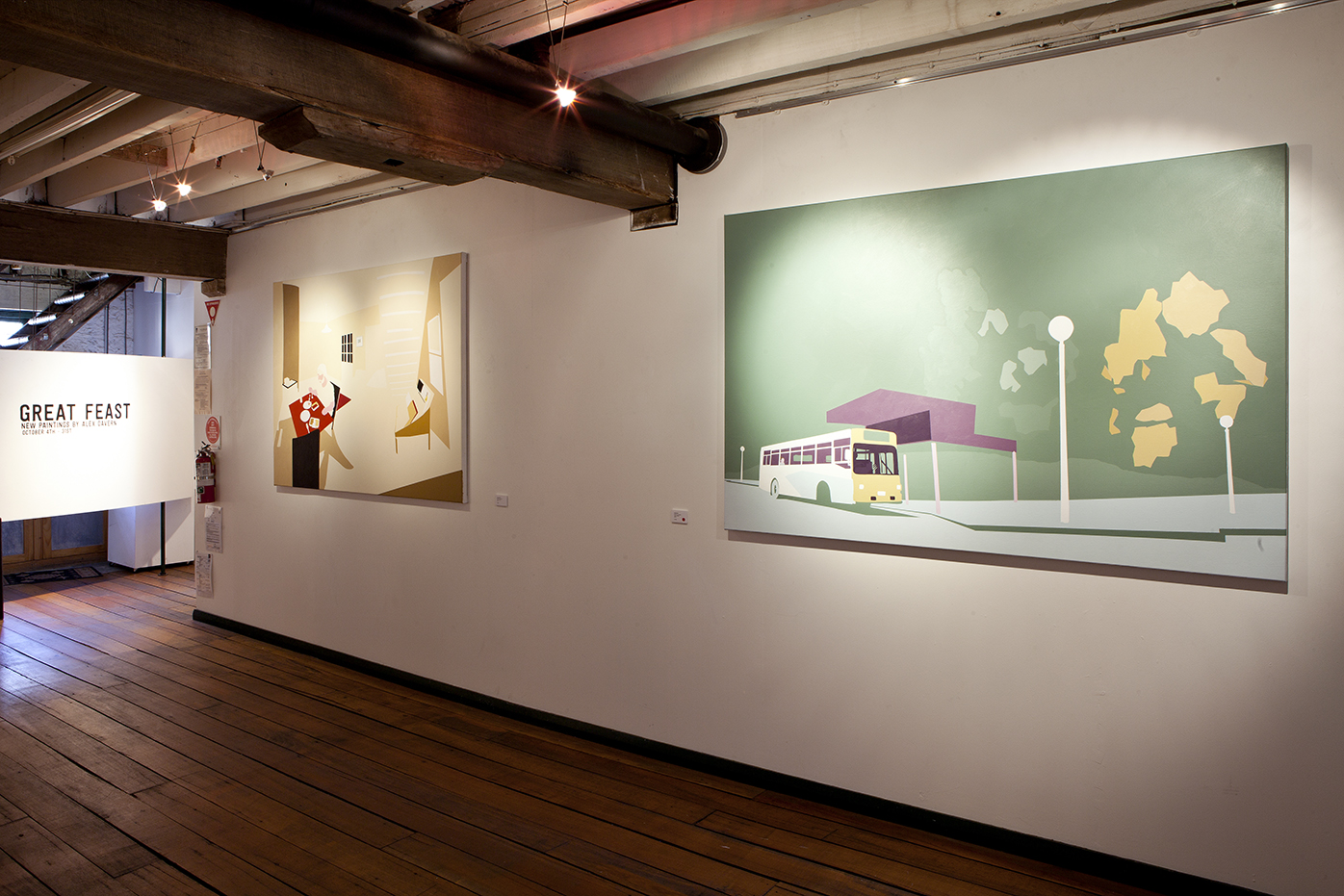
Exhibition space at the Long Gallery.

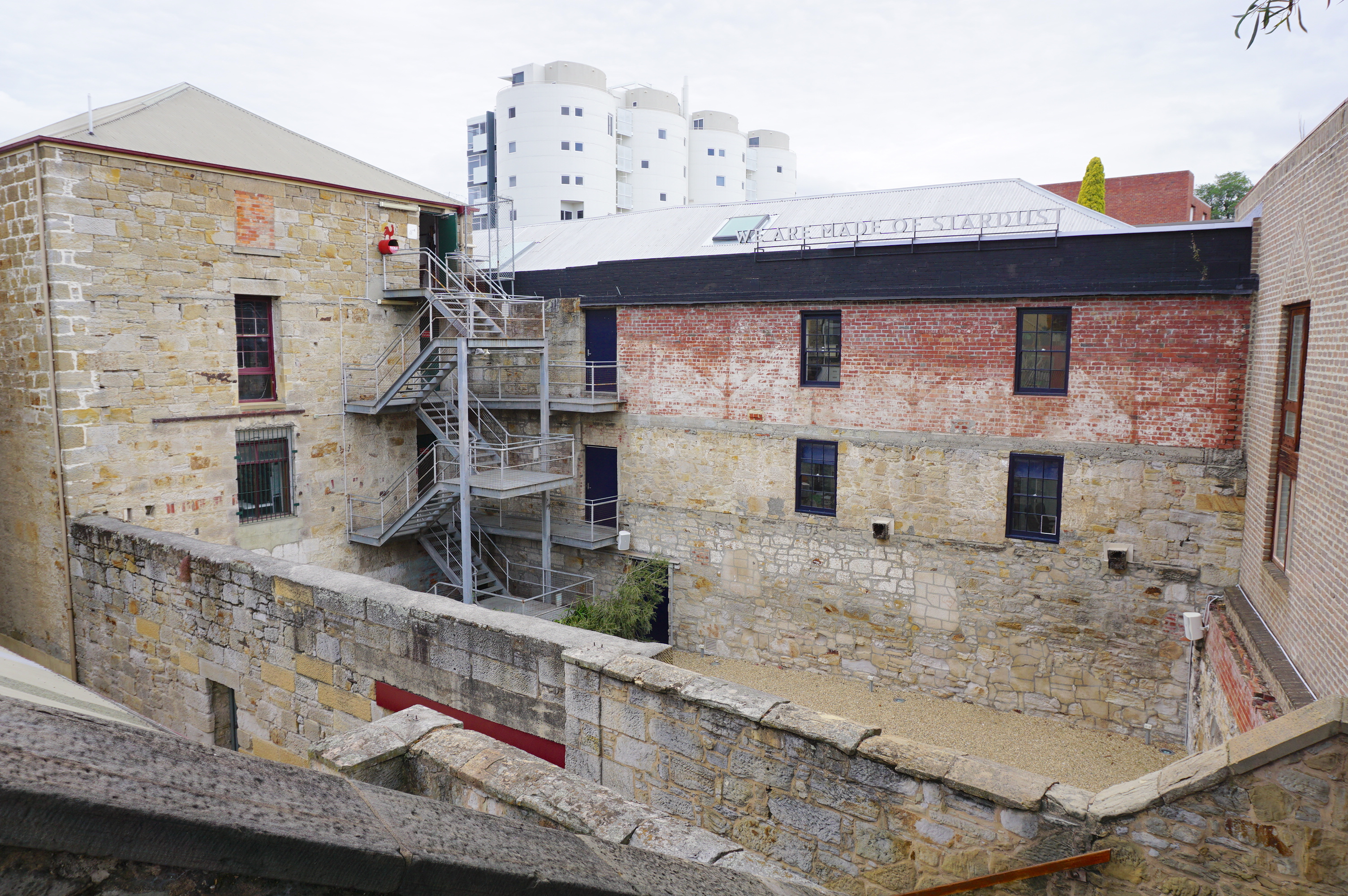
A courtyard space within the SAC.

== See also ==
- Salamanca Market
- Salamanca Place
