= Salamanca Place =

Precinct in Hobart, Tasmania, Australia

Coordinates: 42°53′12″S 147°19′55″E

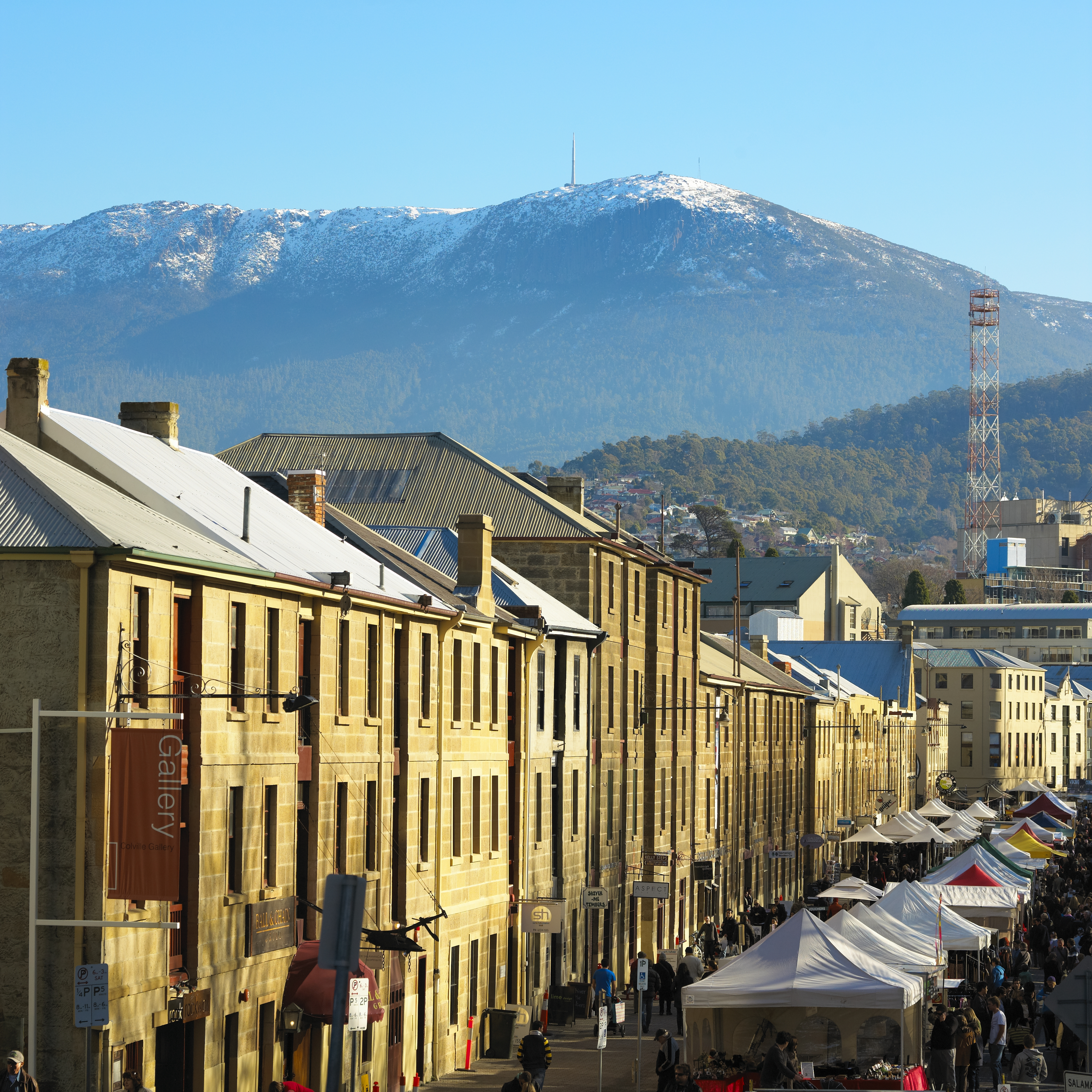
- Salamanca Place and Kunanyi / Mount Wellington
- Country: Australia
- State: Tasmania
- City: Hobart
- LGA: City of Hobart
- Postcode: 7004
Localities around Salamanca Place
Hobart	Hobart	River Derwent
Hobart	Salamanca Place	River Derwent
Sandy Bay	Battery Point	River Derwent

Salamanca Place is a historic waterfront precinct in Hobart, the capital city of the Australian island state of Tasmania. Centred on the street of the same name at the foot of Battery Point, it includes a row of nineteenth-century sandstone warehouses, the weekly Salamanca Market, and restaurants, bars, galleries and public spaces.

The precinct developed as part of Hobart Town’s working port and whaling economy. Following a period of decline in the mid-twentieth century, its warehouses were progressively adapted for cultural, commercial and hospitality uses, while the former quarry behind them was redeveloped as Salamanca Square.

== History ==
The barque Loongana moored at New Wharf, with the Salamanca Place warehouses behind, c. 1880.

The area was formerly known as “The Cottage Green”. It was renamed Salamanca Place after the British victory at the Battle of Salamanca in 1812, fought during the Peninsular War; the name reflected the colony’s strong identification with Britain and its military successes during the Napoleonic Wars.

=== Waterfront and warehouses ===
In the early 1830s, the growth of shipping and whaling prompted the development of "New Wharf" at the foot of Battery Point. Warehouses were constructed to serve Hobart Town’s expanding maritime trade, using sandstone quarried immediately behind the site.

Built with convict labour, the three- and four-storey buildings served as bonded warehouses. They featured loading openings on their upper floors and substantial internal timber structures. Goods stored in the warehouses included whale oil, wool, grain, spirits and imported merchandise.

As whaling declined in the later nineteenth century, the warehouses were adapted for other commercial and industrial uses. Fruit processing became an important activity, with buildings used for the production and storage of jam, cordial and canned fruit. These industries employed many workers, including women, before declining during the twentieth century.

Writing in 1957, author and journalist Michael Sharland described the warehouses at Salamanca Place as "the most attractive group of colonial buildings gracing any Australian waterfront". Similarly, the Register of the National Estate described the warehouses at 47–89 Salamanca Place as "undoubtedly the best group of waterfront Georgian warehouses remaining in Australia". Salamanca Place's historic sandstone warehouses have been compared to Campbell's Stores at The Rocks in Sydney.

=== Decline and adaptive reuse ===
By the mid-twentieth century, parts of the warehouse precinct had deteriorated and were threatened with redevelopment. Conservation and arts advocates campaigned for their retention and reuse. The Tasmanian Government acquired buildings that were subsequently adapted for arts and community activities, and the Salamanca Arts Centre opened in 1976.

The precinct’s redevelopment continued with the adaptation of warehouses for galleries, shops, offices and hospitality businesses, and the creation of Salamanca Square behind the warehouse row in the mid-1990s.

The former wheat silos at the edge of Salamanca Place were also converted to residential use. The eleven-storey building retained its original external concrete structure and was adapted to accommodate thirty apartments, alongside an adjoining building containing commercial premises and serviced apartments.

== Culture ==
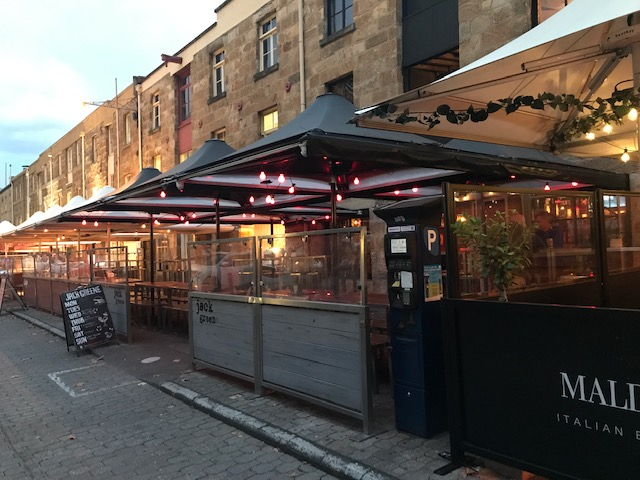
Outdoor seating of restaurants at Salamanca Place

Salamanca Lawns during the Winter Feast as part of Dark Mofo festivities

Salamanca Place accommodates restaurants, bars, galleries, studios, craft shops, hotels and offices. The Salamanca Arts Centre occupies former warehouses within the precinct, while adjoining laneways and public spaces connect Salamanca Place with the waterfront and Battery Point.

The precinct hosts events associated with Dark Mofo, the Museum of Old and New Art's midwinter arts and music festival.

Salamanca Place is also associated with live music and nightlife, and is colloquially known as the "Salamanca strip". Musician Paul Kelly has recalled playing his first gig there in 1974.

=== Salamanca Arts Centre ===
The Salamanca Arts Centre is a major arts hub and multi-disciplinary creative precinct established in 1976. Located within several sandstone warehouses, it houses various performing and visual arts venues, artist studios, administrative offices, and retail spaces.

=== Salamanca Market ===
Salamanca Market is held along Salamanca Place each Saturday. Established in the early 1970s, it has become a major visitor attraction and a regular feature of the precinct.

=== In popular culture ===
Salamanca Place appears as a property in the Australian edition of the board game Monopoly.

== Public spaces ==
Salamanca Square was developed behind the warehouse row in the mid-1990s. The sheltered public square includes lawns and a central fountain, with shops, cafés and restaurants around its perimeter.

Kelly's Steps connect Salamanca Place with Battery Point. Constructed during the nineteenth-century whaling boom, they provided a pedestrian link between the waterfront and the residential area above.

=== Tasman Fountain ===
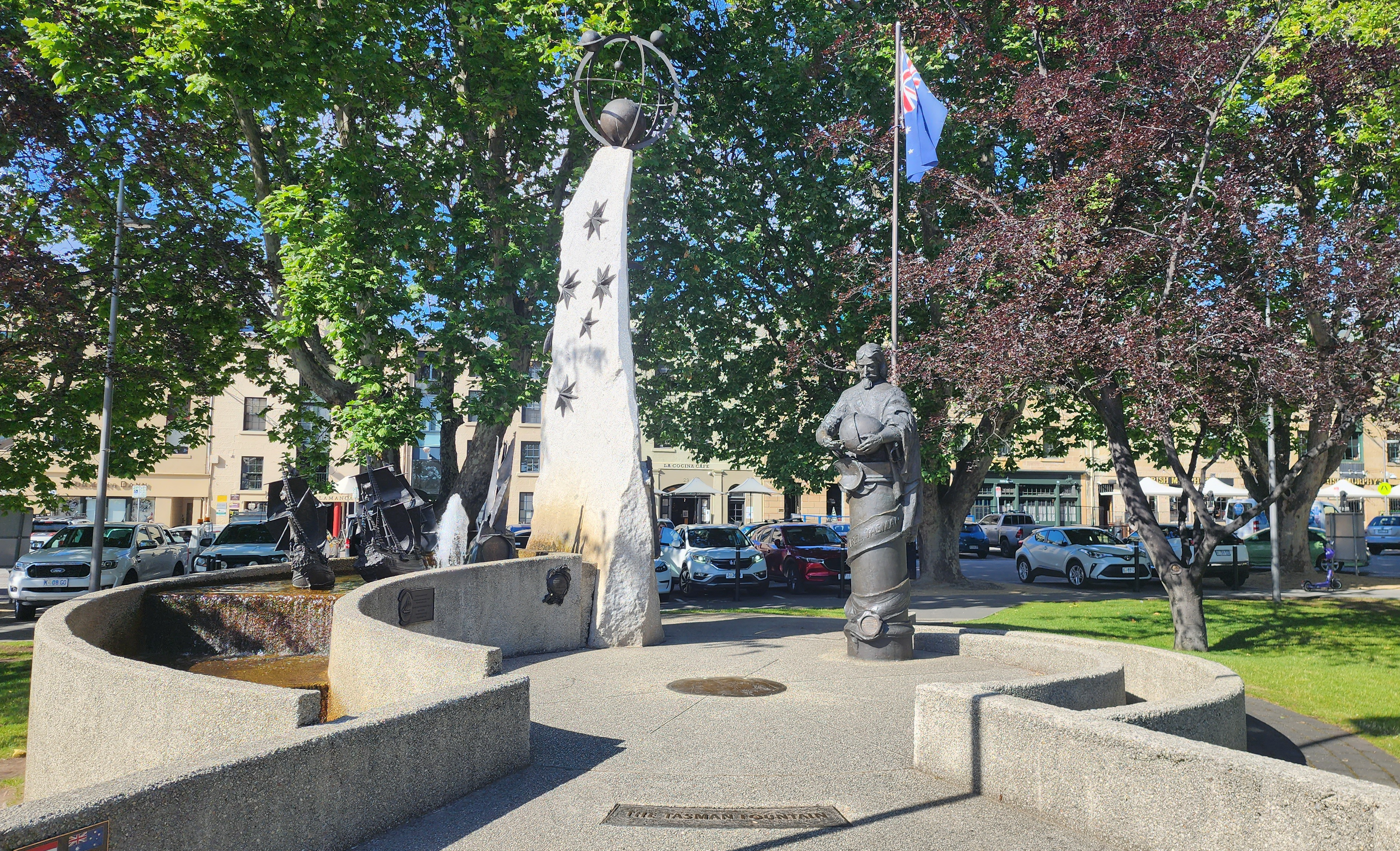
The Tasman Fountain

Located between Gladstone Street and Montpelier Retreat, the Tasman Fountain is a monument and water fountain unveiled by Queen Beatrix of the Netherlands during her visit for the Australian Bicentenary celebrations in 1988. The fountain was constructed with finances provided by the Dutch government, with additional funds raised by the Dutch Australian Society of Tasmania. Sculpted by Stephen Walker, the monument features a bronze statue of Abel Tasman holding a globe and a nautical compass, set near a water feature depicting his ships, Heemskerck and Zeehaen. A commemorative plaque providing historical details of the project and Tasman's 1642 voyage was added in 1999.

== Gallery ==
New Wharf viewed from the tower of St David’s Cathedral, c. 1857

New Wharf warehouses at Salamanca Place, c. 1860

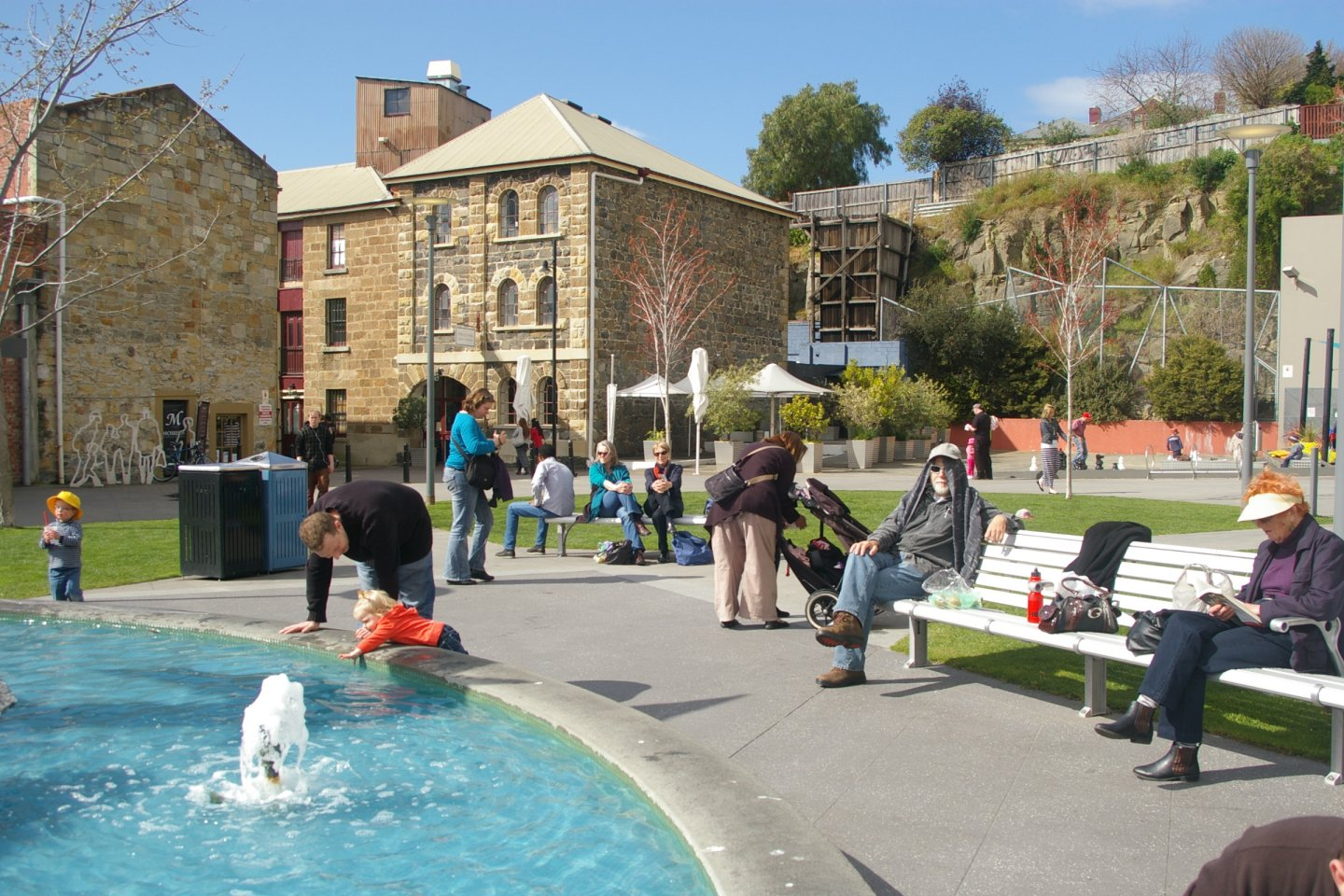
Salamanca Square, looking from the fountain towards the former quarry

== Sources ==
- "A Self Guided Tour of the Salamanca Arts Centre" (PDF). Salamanca Arts Centre. Archived from the original (PDF) on 19 July 2008.
- Williams, Steph (5 June 2020). "The Origins Of Salamanca - Then And Now". The Hobart / Launceston Magazine. Archived from the original on 4 November 2024.
- Corrigan, Peter R; Heffernan, Michael R; Howell, G; McFall, Daryl P (1960), History of warehouses: 65-67 Salamanca Place, Hobart
- GW Foran; SJ Walker; AK Young (1 January 1998), The possible effects of Oceanport upon the Social Value of Salamanca Place and Princes Wharf
- Enterprise Marketing and Research Services; Hobart (Tas.). Council (2007), Salamanca Market sustainability study : summary of conclusions and key recommendations, Hobart City Council
- Lloyd, Bernard; Shelley, Samuel; Hobart (Tas.). Council (2014), Salamanca Market : A short history of a long market / written by Bernard Lloyd ; photographer, Samuel Shelley, City of Hobart, ISBN 9780980710236 – via National Library of Australia
- Hope, Anthony R (2006), A quarry speaks : a pictorial history of Sullivans Cove, Salamanca Place and Battery Point from the perspective of the Salamanca Quarry, Hobart, Tasmania, 1803 to 2005 / Anthony R. Hope, Anthony R. Hope, ISBN 9780646450032 – via National Library of Australia
- "Antarctic And Southern Ocean Centre" (PDF). Parliament of Tasmania.
- Sharland, Michael; Australian National Publicity Association.; Australian Geographical Society. (1934), "v. : ill., maps. ; 34 cm.", Hobart Steps to Maturity, Walkabout (magazine), Melbourne: Australian National Travel Association, ISSN 0043-0064, nla.obj-744611558 – via Trove
- Salamanca Quarry Development (Archival file), Tasmanian Archives, 12 January 1996, AD930/1/1073, Office of the Premier, Premiers' Appointment Files (Ray Groom)
- Australian Heritage Council (2007). Sullivans Cove and Precinct (PDF) (National Heritage List assessment report).
- Darby, Andrew (22 November 1997). "$150 million port development splits Hobart". News and Features. The Sydney Morning Herald. p. 11 – via NewsBank.
