= Cat and Fiddle Arcade =

Shopping centre in Hobart, Tasmania, Australia

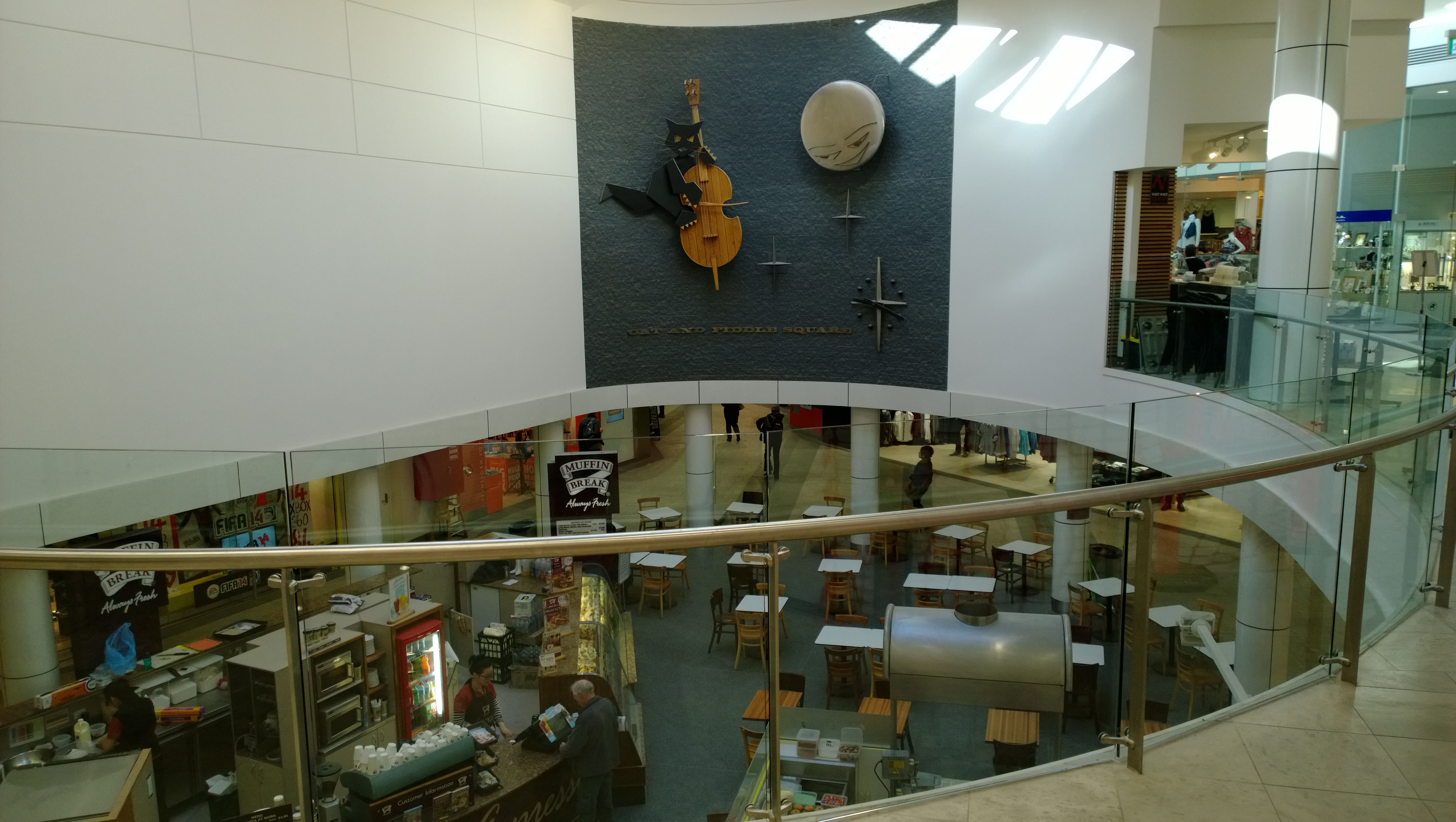
- The Cat and Fiddle clock. A cow jumps over the moon
- Location: Hobart central business district, Australia
- Coordinates: 42°52′55″S 147°19′37″E
- Opened: 31 July 1962
- Developer: Charles Davis (from 1959, designed by Philp Lighton, Floyd and Beattie with planning by Hartley Wilson and Dirk Bolt). Gerard O'Brien (since 2010)
- Manager: Silverleaf Investments Pty Ltd
- Num. of stores: 70
- Num. of anchor tenants: 2
- Floors: 2
- Parking: 1700 (Centrepoint and Hobart Central)
- Website: www.catandfiddlearcade.com

The Cat and Fiddle Arcade is a shopping mall and hub located in Hobart, Tasmania, Australia and covers a city block made up of about 17 buildings at 49-51 Murray Street. It is famous for its musical clock, which plays the Hey Diddle Diddle nursery rhyme hourly with glockenspiel and vibraphone, and is a local tourist attraction. Cat and Fiddle Square (the location of a food court, and formerly a fountain) also holds other music events and occasionally art installations. Along with at least 70 specialty stores, the mall is Hobart's major clothing and fashion retail centre containing a Myer and Target which each cover two levels, as well as an H&M.

It is accessible via the Icon Complex on Liverpool Street and Murray Street, and the Elizabeth Street Mall (close to the Hobart Bus Mall), and bounded by Collins Street where there is a skybridge to Trafalgar Place. It is also located directly between other malls in the shopping precinct, including the Wellington Centre (via Wellington Court or the Bank Arcade, anchored by a Woolworths) and Centrepoint Shopping Centre.

== History ==
The arcade's name is the legacy of the 1817 alley (now called Elizabeth Lane), where at Wellington Bridge over the Hobart Rivulet an inn flagged by a painting of a yellow cat and fiddle (The Cat and Fiddle) was situated until the 1830s (between Charles Davis' ironmongery and John Watt Beattie's photography studio). Into the 1860s the Cat and Fiddle Alley retained a notoriety as a characterfully rough and unsanitary, but central locale. The arrangement of the arcade still follows the path of the underground Rivulet.

The 1962 opening was attended by Alderman Basil Osborne and the ABC Orchestra. The hardware department store Charles Davis operated from 1847 to 1984 (and later acquired nearby FitzGerald's in 1981, both now Harris Scarfe) at the site, and the business pursued its redevelopment inspired by other modern malls such as Chadstone Shopping Centre in Melbourne which opened two years prior. After 1973 the name is used by Cat & Fiddle Press, a reference to WE Fuller's Bookshop and J Walch & Sons which had at various times been based nearby.

Major floods have affected the mall, including in 1929, 1947 and most recently in 2018. It received upgrades during 2010 to 2015, but during reconstruction works for the ICON Centre in 2016 (following the 2007 Myer fire), part of the Rivulet retaining wall collapsed beneath some arcade tenancies.

== See also ==
- List of shopping centres in Australia
