= Elizabeth Street Mall =

Pedestrian street mall in Hobart, Tasmania

Coordinates: 42.882°S 147.328°E

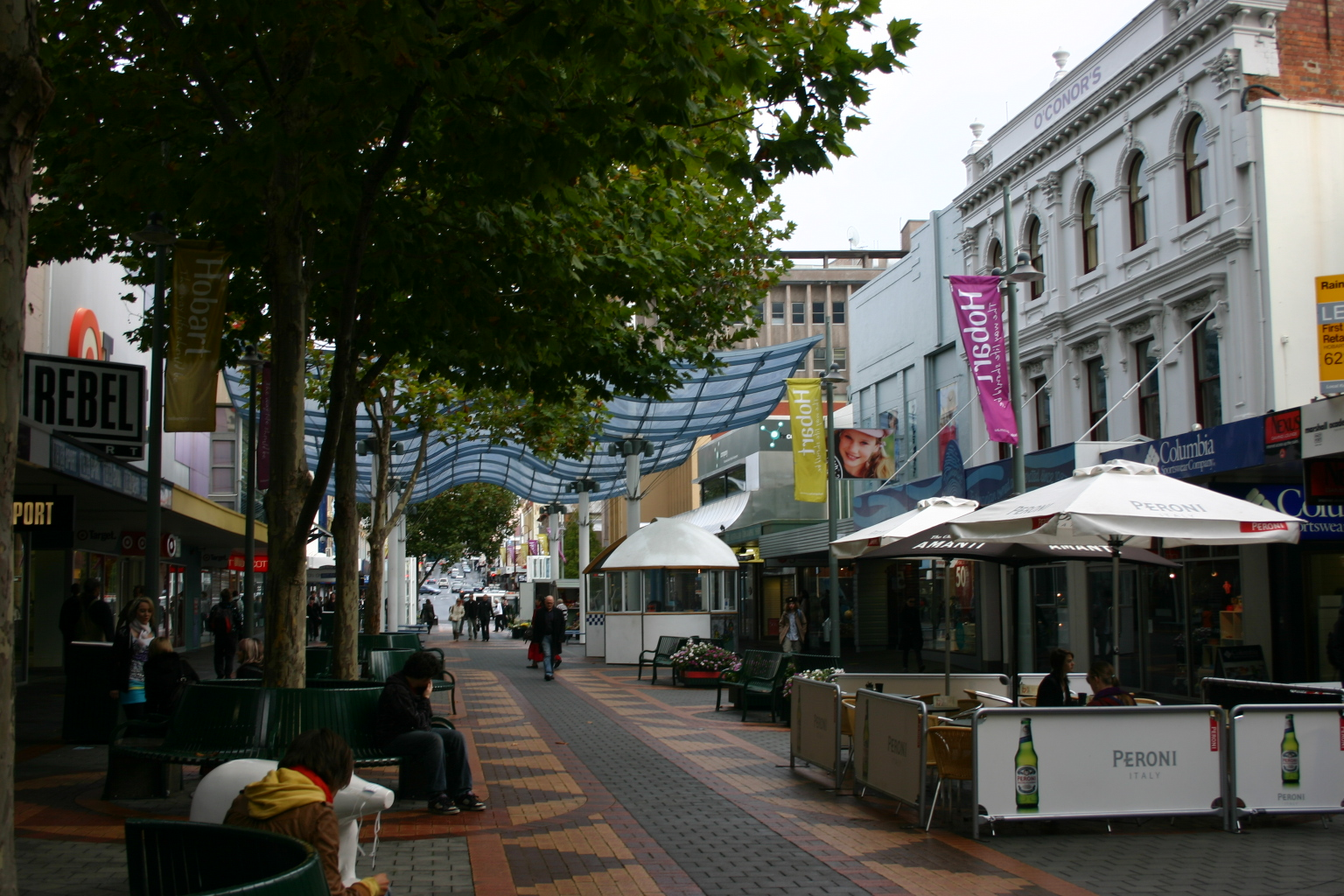
Elizabeth Street Mall

Elizabeth Street Mall is a pedestrian street mall in Hobart, Tasmania. It is located on Elizabeth Street, running for one block between Collins Street and Liverpool Street. It is the largest shopping area in the Hobart city centre. It is also a busy meeting place and busking area.

The mall was created in the 1970s when small-scale pedestrianisations were briefly popular in Australia and other countries. At the time this was opposed by some businesses, but now the street is one of the busiest in the city.

== Features ==
=== Shopping centres ===
Located in Hobart's historical nexus and by the Hobart Bus Mall, it is a central access point for a number of the city's boutique and high-end shopping destinations, including shopping malls such as:

- The Wellington Centre and Arcade (15 shops and a Woolworths), which is connected to Wellington Court through to the Bank Arcade (16 shops) and a TasTAFE at Purdys Mart.
- The Cat and Fiddle Arcade (70 shops) via Elizabeth Lane, which connects to the Myer anchor and through to Centrepoint Shopping Centre (34 shops) across Murray Street.

=== Wellington Bridge ===
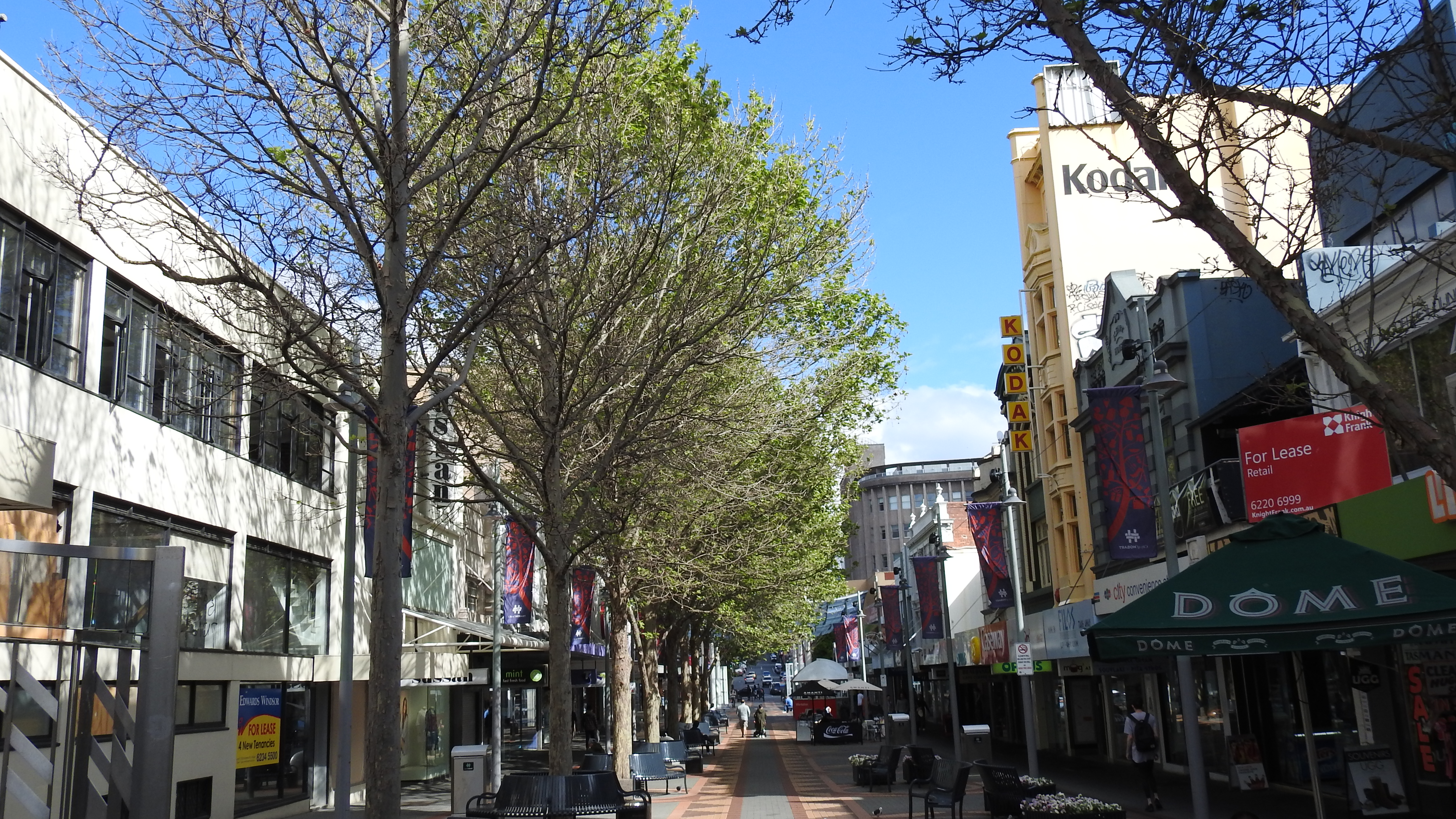
View of the mall with the Kodak building painted yellow on the right

The Elizabeth Street Mall was once a crossing of the Hobart Rivulet valley, and there were many historic bridges before it was canalised and subsequently buried. The Wellington Bridge, which has been a popular gathering space, is still visible within the mall as a landmark. In 1913:

"The distance by road from Hobart to Launceston is calculated as from Wellington Bridge, … On one side palatial buildings were erected a few years ago. … on Saturday nights, [sporting men and youths] play the afternoon's football match all over again. Some of the greatest sporting events of the year are lost and won on Wellington Bridge. … on Walch's Corner, the kerbstone politicians settle the fate of the crowned heads of the world … Mayorships and judgeships are given deep thought in common with other great public questions … The glory of Wellington Bridge will not depart with the new building. On the contrary, the latter will shed new light in the locality, and will tend to throw some light on the arguments of the habitues."

In a similar spirit, the bridge was the location of a modern Speakers' Corner.

=== Kodak building ===
A well-known five-storey Neo-Gothic former Kodak Australasia Pty Ltd building is located on the mall at 45 Elizabeth Street and opened in 1915. There was an attempt to preserve the disused building through adaptation in 2020.
