= Liverpool Street, Hobart =

Street in Hobart, Tasmania

Liverpool Street Tasmania
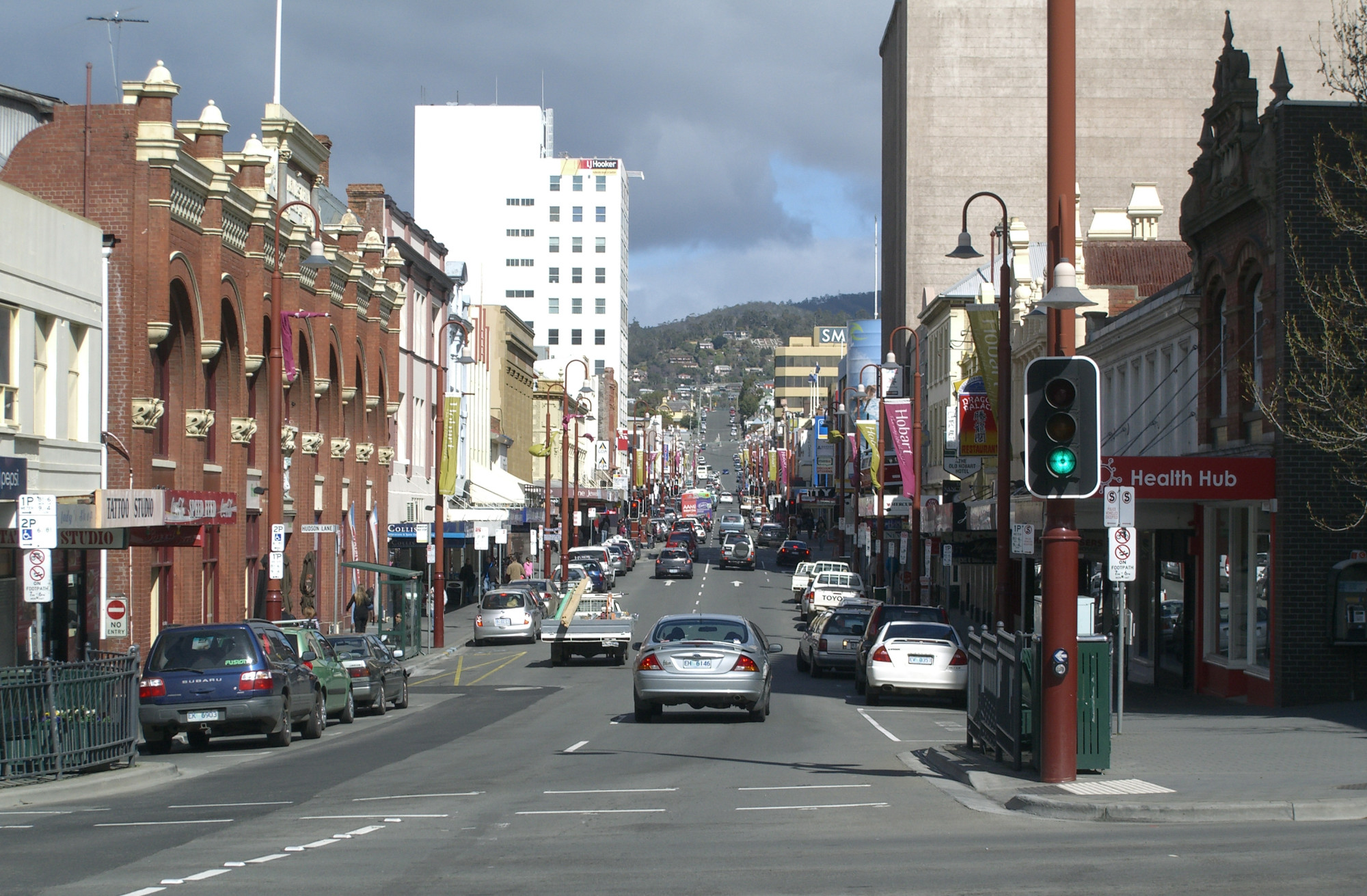
- Liverpool Street from the Argyle Street intersection with the 1831 Webster facade to the left

General information
- Type: Street
- Length: 1 km (0.6 mi)

Major junctions
- East end: Brooker Avenue
- West end: West Hobart

Location(s)
- Suburb(s): Hobart CBD, West Hobart

Liverpool Street is one of the main streets in the Hobart central business district, Tasmania, Australia.

It runs parallel to Macquarie and Davey streets from Brooker Avenue's Railway Roundabout in the north, then southward through the central section of the CBD where it crosses Campbell, Argyle, Elizabeth and Murray streets, and then on to the south end of the city centre across Watchorn, Harrington, Barrack and Molle streets.

Royal Hobart Hospital is located on its eastern side, near Brooker Avenue. It is connected via a skybridge over Argyle Street to the Wellington Centre, which has an entrance on Liverpool with Woolworths Hobart CBD and the Bank Arcade.

Historically locals referred to the west end of Hobart's CBD when frequenting the cinema or theatre along Liverpool Street, which was home to the Odeon Theatre and His Majesty’s Theatre. Village Cinemas capitalised on this in 1976, naming Tasmania's first multiplex on nearby Collins Street the West End Twin.

It has had in the past hotels, like Harringtons, on the corner of Liverpool and Harrington Street. Many large banks still run along its length, such as a National Australia Bank at a corner of Elizabeth Street opposite Goldings Corner.

On 22 September 2007, fire destroyed the historic Myer building. In November 2014, construction started on the site. On 26 November 2015, stage 1 of the new Myer store opened as the Icon Complex, with access to the Cat & Fiddle Arcade. During construction of stage 1 at Myer Liverpool Street between Murray and Elizabeth streets was changed from two lanes to one lane.

== Liverpool Street tram line ==
Between 1893 and 1958, trams operated along the Liverpool Street line. Commencing at the Hobart railway station, the line travelled up Liverpool Street through Hobart CBD, before beginning to climb westwards into the foothills of Mount Wellington. It was a double track to Warwick Street, except for two sections where the curve or narrowness of the road required a single contraflow section of track.

This line was exceptionally heavily used, and during peak hour traffic, it was usual for two cars to run each scheduled service. On certain occasions, even three cars were operated in conjunction for the run as far as Warwick Street.

The Liverpool Street line crossed the Elizabeth Street line on the level at the junction which is now the northern end of the Elizabeth Street Mall, but its only connection to the rest of the network was a single line in Park and lower Macquarie streets in front of the Hobart tram depot.
