= 2018 Hobart floods =

Natural disaster in Tasmania, Australia

The 2018 Hobart floods were severe weather events in the region of Hobart in Tasmania, Australia that caused widespread damage and flooding on 11 May 2018.

They were declared a disaster, as result of the damage.

Subsequent weather a week later also caused problems.

== See also ==
- 1929 Tasmanian floods
- June 1947 Tasmanian floods
