= Barrack Street (disambiguation) =

Barrack Street is one of two major cross-streets in the central business district of Perth, Western Australia.

Barrack Street may also refer to:

== Streets ==
- Barrack Street, Hobart, Tasmania, Australia
- Barrack Street, the location of Elizabeth Fort in Cork, Ireland
- Barrack Street, the location of The McManus: Dundee's Art Gallery and Museum in Dundee, Scotland
- Barrack Street, a section of R328 road in Dunmore, Galway, Ireland

== Other uses ==
- Barrack Street, a greyhound in the 1969 English Greyhound Derby

== See also ==
- Barrack Street Bridge, Perth
- Barrack Street Jetty, Perth
- Barrack Square
- Barrack (disambiguation)
