= FitzGerald's =

Former retail chain in Tasmania, Australia

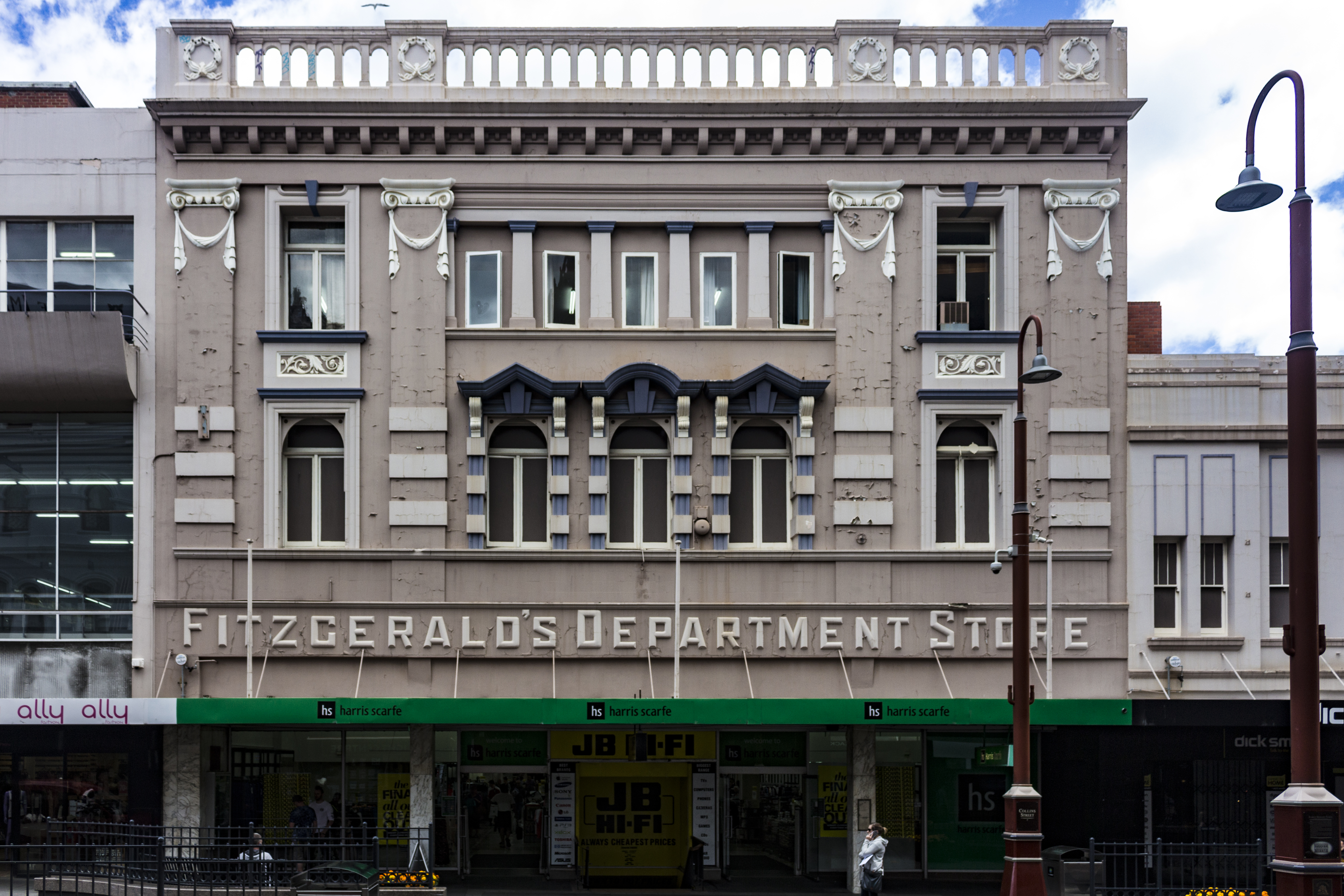
- Former FitzGerald's store in Hobart 2017 with original lettering still visible
- Industry: Retail
- Founded: 1886; 140 years ago Hobart, Tasmania, Australia
- Founder: George Parker FitzGerald
- Defunct: 1995; 31 years ago
- Fate: Merged with Harris Scarfe
- Area served: Tasmania

FitzGerald's was Tasmania's largest chain of department stores. The chain was rebranded and relaunched as Harris Scarfe in 1995, and the renamed stores continue to trade today.

== History ==
FitzGerald's was founded in March 1886, when George Parker FitzGerald—one of the early scholars of Hutchins School—established a wholesale business at 79 Collins Street, Hobart (later occupied by W. Coogan & Sons, now called Coogans). The original store was completely destroyed by fire in July 1911, and was rebuilt within eight months, with the new store opening on 21 March 1912.

FitzGerald's was a Tasmanian majority family owned department store business until it was acquired by Charles Davis in 1981. It was by far the largest Tasmanian department store retailer, with a substantial flagship store in Hobart with frontages to Collins Street, Murray Street and Elizabeth Street.

FitzGerald's also had substantial stores in Launceston and Burnie (occupying the site of a former theatre), as well as stores in suburban Hobart (Eastlands and Moonah) and a small (600 square metre) store in New Norfolk (occupying a general store built in 1914). When the Venture chain of department stores collapsed in 1994, FitzGerald's acquired and rebadged the Venture stores at Devonport and Ulverstone. As at May 1995, it operated eight stores.

Briefly, between 1993–1995, FitzGerald's operated a store at Forest Hill in suburban Melbourne. This was Harris Scarfe. It later became a Harris Scarfe store then Myer and now it is a Harris Scarfe again.

In 1995, after incurring annual trading losses exceeding $2 million, the FitzGerald's chain was merged with Charles Davis' Harris Scarfe department store chain, with all of the stores being brought under Harris Scarfe management and rebadged as "Harris Scarfe". Although the stores continue to operate under the Harris Scarfe banner, several have closed: New Norfolk in 2000, Eastlands in 2001 and Burnie in 2008. The Launceston store has been substantially reduced, with the store almost halving in size due to the sale of the Mikinlay's building, a former neighboring department store. In 2017, the Hobart store closed temporarily for a major redevelopment and reopened in 2018, however, closed soon after in 2020 due to financial problems.
