= Donald Trescowthick =

Australian businessman (1930–2024)

Sir Donald Henry Trescowthick, AC, KBE (4 December 1930 – 13 August 2024) was an Australian businessman.

== Biography ==
Trescowthick was born in Ballarat, Victoria, on 4 December 1930, to Thomas Patrick and Elsie May Trescowthick (née Venner). He married Norma Margaret Callaghan on 25 October 1953 and they had two sons and two daughters. He died on 13 August 2024, at the age of 93. Norma predeceased him in March 2024.

== Business activities ==
Trescowthick was involved in several Australian business enterprises.

=== Swann Insurance ===
In 1962, Trescowthick and Sir Arthur Warner bought Swann Insurance, which grew to be a major general insurer. Prior to being sold to CGU Insurance, Swann Insurance was Australia's largest privately owned general insurer.

=== Charles Davis ===
Trescowthick acquired Charles Davis, a major Tasmanian company which had been established in 1847. Charles Davis grew under Trescowthick's leadership to become at one time Australia's fourth largest retailer, and third largest department store operator. The company was renamed Harris Scarfe in 1995.

=== Private business activities ===
In addition to his involvement in Charles Davis Limited, Trescowthick was involved in several private ventures, including ownership of the Place Arcade in Toorak Village shopping centre in Melbourne Australia.

== Community, sporting and charitable activities ==
Trescowthick was involved in community, sporting and charitable activities during his business career.

In particular:

- He supported the Geelong Football Club, and at one time was their No. 1 ticketholder.
- He chaired Australian Olympic fundraising appeals.
- He supported the establishment of the Melbourne–Hobart yacht race.
- His support led to the establishment of the Sir Donald and Lady Trescowthick Centre for aged care in Prahran Victoria.
- He supported fundraising for construction of the tower for St Francis Xavier's Cathedral in Adelaide South Australia. (Harris Scarfe conducted fundraisers in its Rundle Mall department store).

== Honours ==
Trescowthick was made a Knight Commander of the Order of the British Empire in 1979 and a Companion of the Order of Australia in 1991. He was inducted into the Sport Australia Hall of Fame in 1991 and received an Australian Sports Medal in 2000.

== Sources ==
- Harris Scarfe Holdings Limited 1995 Annual Report
- Harris Scarfe Holdings Limited 2000 Annual Report
