= Charles Davis (department store) =

Australian department store company

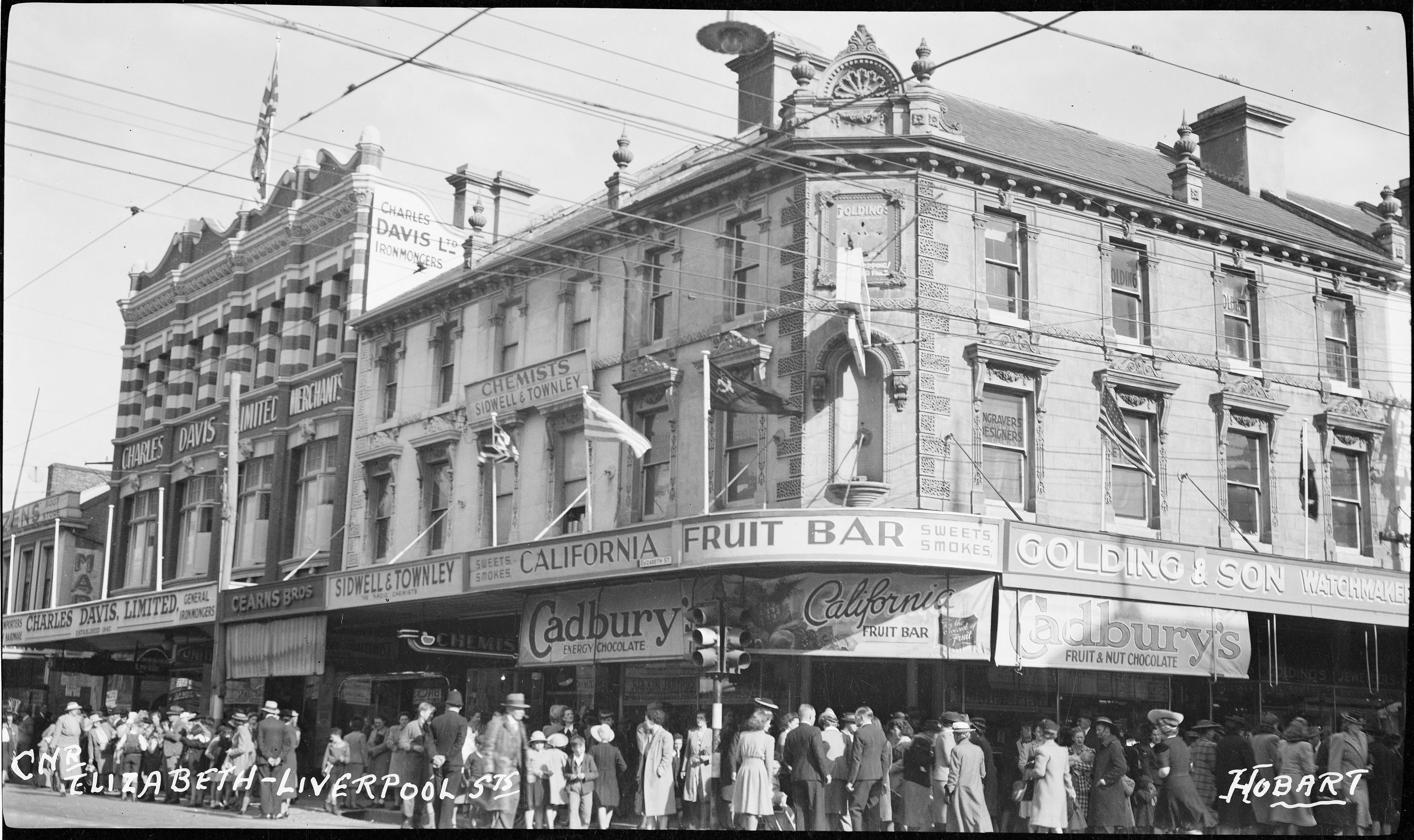
- Charles Davis store on the corner of Elizabeth and Liverpool Street, Hobart
- Type: Private
- Industry: Investment, manufacturing and interests
- Founded: 1847; 179 years ago
- Founder: Charles Davis
- Defunct: 2001
- Headquarters: Hobart, Australia

Charles Davis was a department store company established in Hobart, Tasmania, in 1847 and is one of Australia's oldest companies. It had several businesses across the surrounding states in industries such as manufacturing, boating including yachts and races and hardware and electrical equipment.

The company was founded by Charles Davis, an Englishman who had been transported to the Tasmanian penal colony as a convict. He established a hardware, ironmongery and tinsmithing business which grew to become one of Tasmania's major business enterprises including moving it to the Cat & Fiddle Arcade where it remained into the 1970s. Davis fully owned the company until in 1911, at age 87, when he limited himself to a chairman, and his family continued to operate the company until the 1970s. Donald Trescowthick took over control of the business from the Davis family in the 1970s and the company embarked on significant expansion and diversification under his management.

At various times, the company had investments in wholesaling, retailing, car distribution, property, hotels and motels and mining. In 1971, Sir Donald Trescowthick gained a majority shareholding of 54 percent through his company Signet Insurance Group, which was a company with assets of $27 million an annual turnover of $35 million and eventually renamed as Harris Scarfe Holdings Limited in 1995. The company factory and original shop closed in 1984. After the church change of name, the company focused on its department store activities and divested all other business activities.

At its height, the company was Australia's third-largest retailer (November 1989), after acquiring many significant regional retailers, including Harris Scarfe, Cox Foys, FitzGerald's, Lloyd's hardware stores, Campbell's hardware stores and McEwans.

In 1970, Charles Davis negotiated with American-based Kline Iron & Steel to bring lightweight steel roofing trusses to the United States. Philips Industries of Launceston was acquired in 1974, giving the company presence in each of the state's three main regions, south, Burnie in the northwest. In 1975, Charles Davis Limited was a sponsor of the Melbourne to Hobart Yacht Race. The McEwans hardware stores group was divested in a management buyout in 1988.

At this time, the company merged its Harris Scarfe and FitzGerald's retailing operations, which continued to grow to become Australia's third largest department store group. It also once owned interests in Perpetual Insurance and Securities, owner of Eastlands Shopping Centre which increased from 83% to 91% in 1973–1974 and also in Co-Operative Motors, distributor of Toyota, Triumph, Mercedes-Benz and Rambler.

After suffering financial difficulties, the company was placed in receivership in 2001 and the Charles Davis name was bought by Davis's great-great-granddaughter for $120.
