= June 1947 Tasmanian floods =

Natural disaster in Tasmania, Australia

In June 1947 the southern half of Tasmania was affected by its largest floods on record. Although flooding at its peak between 16 and 18 June affected almost all rivers and streams across the island, in the rest of the state, the flooding did not approach the extent of the better-known 1929 floods. Floods on rivers such as the Derwent and Huon were the largest on record and caused considerable damage.

== Background ==
The year 1946 had been one of the wettest on record throughout Tasmania: Hobart's annual rainfall of 1,004 millimetres (40 in) is the second highest in 130 years of record and featured two record wet months in March and August but the first few months of 1947 were relatively dry. However, an east coast cyclone on 24 and 25 May set in motion a sequence of low pressure systems that produced almost continuous rainfall over southern and western Tasmania that extended occasionally to the rest of the island, especially on the third and fourth of June when falls reached 70 millimetres (2.8 in) for two days in Hobart and 60 millimetres (2.4 in) in Swansea.

These systems produced only localised flooding, but when a strong frontal system that had produced extremely heavy rain in the far south of Western Australia with record daily falls at Manjimup moved rapidly eastwards and intensified, rainfall over Tasmania, which had been consistent ever since the beginning of the month, intensified to the extent of general falls of over 8 inches (200 mm) on the highlands and 3 inches (80 mm) on the southeast coast during the three-day period ending 17 June, a day after the King's Birthday holiday

On ground that was already saturated, rivers in the south of Tasmania reached almost unprecedented levels, for instance it is estimated that the Huon reached flows as large as 4,000m^{3}/s, larger than the flow of the Sepik River in New Guinea, whilst the flood on the Derwent was the highest of the twentieth century and not exceeded since at least the 1870s at around 3,500m^{3}/s. At Butler's Gorge, hydroelectric operations were completely washed out and it was notable that without energy for heating in most homes during wet weather with maxima around 10 °C (50 °F) there were no deaths, in part because Lake St. Clair stored enough water to reduce the level of the Derwent by four feet. However, despite the damage to existing hydroelectric services, the floods did not halt operations to develop the hydroelectric potential of more remote parts of the Central Plateau for the reason noted in the previous paragraph.

Nonetheless, the flooding persisted so severely throughout the south of Tasmania that no reports reached the outside world as major towns like Huonville and Geeveston were completely isolated from the sixteenth to the nineteenth of the month and the populations of towns such as Bushy Park were evacuated. Most of southern Tasmania's hop crop was completely lost (replanting was not possible for some time afterwards due to extreme soil erosion in the valley), and it is estimated that over a thousand prime beef cattle drowned in the Huonville district.

== Elsewhere in Tasmania ==
In the isolated West Coast region, washaways on the main transportation route, the Lyell Highway were severe and most rain gauges in the region recorded record daily rainfalls on the 16th, with the highest being 122.7 millimetres (4.8 in) at Waratah in the northwest, which recorded a whopping 522.7 millimetres (20.6 in) for the whole month. Washaways, along with destruction of the state's hydroelectricity infrastructure, meant that only one of the scheduled buses could reach Queenstown from Hobart and it took over a day and a half beyond the usual time to do so.

On the north and east coasts, the flooding did not reach the levels seen in 1929, 1936 or 1955, but nonetheless dislocations of hydroelectric power and road transport were widespread on rivers such as the Mersey, Forth and North and South Esk.
