= Murray Street, Hobart =

Road in Hobart, Tasmania

Murray Street Tasmania
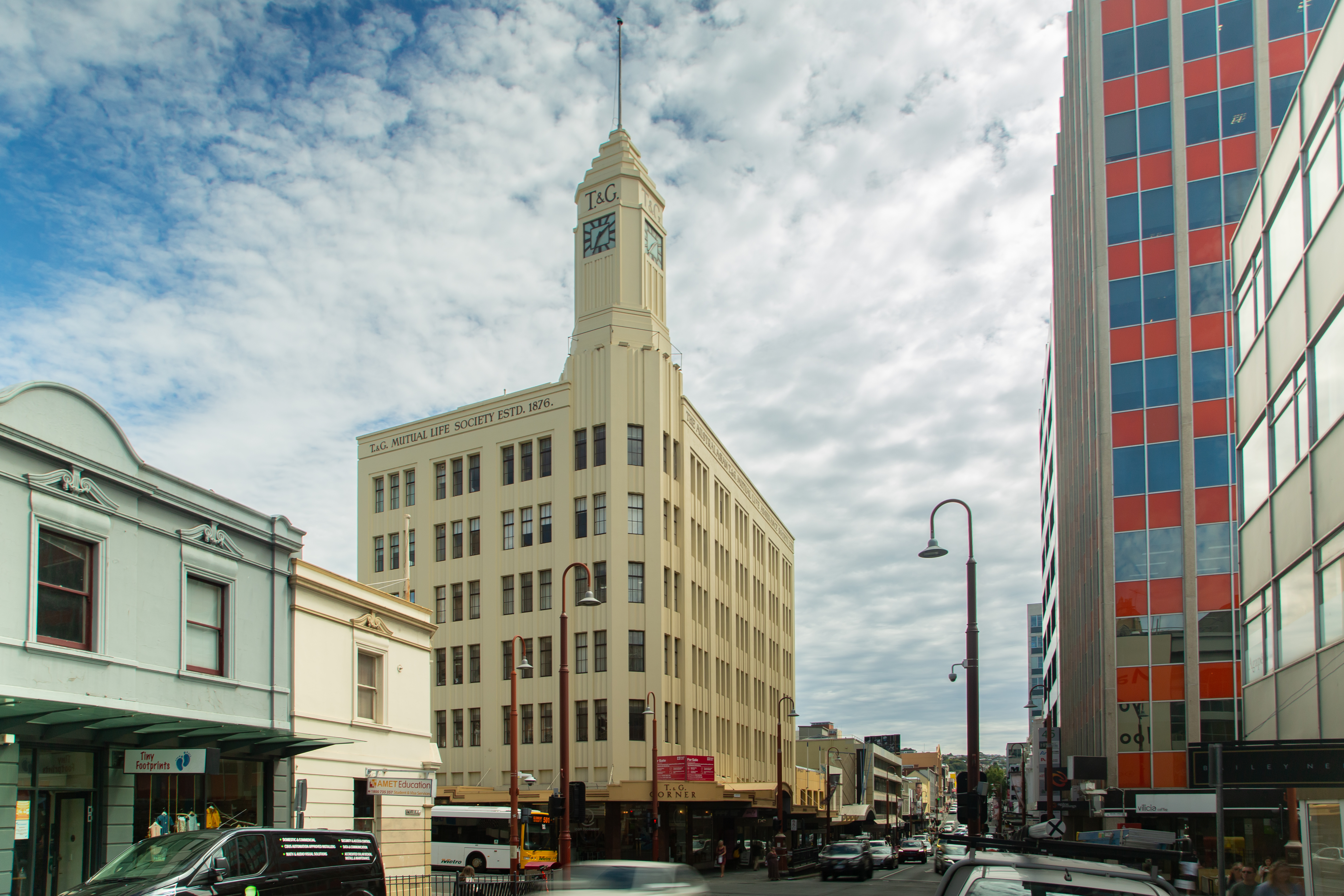
- T & G Mutual Life building on Murray Street as seen from the Collins Street junction
- Coordinates: 42.8809795°S 147.3224545°E

General information
- Type: Street
- Length: 1.7 km (1.1 mi)

Major junctions
- North-West end: Arthur Street, Burnett Street
- Liverpool Street; Macquarie Street; Davey Street
- South-East end: Morrison Street

Location(s)
- LGA(s): City of Hobart
- Suburb(s): North Hobart, Hobart CBD

Murray Street is one of the four key north-west thoroughfares within the Hobart central business district). The street runs approximately 1.7 kilometres (1.1 mi), from the junction of Arthur and Burnett Streets in North Hobart to Morrison Street near Sullivans Cove. It is named after Captain John Murray, who served as commandant of Hobart Town under the administration of Governor Lachlan Macquarie in the early 19th century.

As one of Hobart’s original streets, Murray Street was formalised by James Meehan, a surveyor, on 25 November 1811, during the establishment of the city’s original grid layout.

The street houses several heritage-listed buildings, including St David's Cathedral (1874), the T & G Mutual Life Building (1937), Hadley's Orient Hotel (1862), and the \Customs House Hotel (1846). Murray Street is also home to contemporary commercial spaces, such as Centrepoint and the Cat & Fiddle Arcade.

== History ==
Murray Street was one of the original seven streets planned in Hobart, formalised in 1811 by surveyor James Meehan at the request of Governor Lachlan Macquarie. The layout was designed to intersect the north-west to south-east streets, including Elizabeth Street, with the north-east to south-west roads, such as Collins and Macquarie. The street was named after Captain John Murray, a pivotal figure in the early governance of Hobart Town.

Murray Street is home to a number of significant buildings and institutions, reflecting the evolution of Hobart from a colonial town to a modern city. Many of these buildings have played central roles in Hobart's development and architectural history.

=== Notable Buildings ===
Several heritage and modern buildings line Murray Street:

- St David's Cathedral – Consecrated in 1874, the cathedral is the seat of the Anglican Diocese of Tasmania and a prominent example of Gothic Revival architecture.
- T & G Mutual Life Building – A notable Art Deco building completed in 1937, designed by A & K Henderson. It includes a distinctive stepped clocktower and formerly housed the offices of the T & G Mutual Life Assurance Society.
- Hadley's Orient Hotel – One of the oldest hotels in Tasmania, established in 1862, known for its long-standing association with travellers and visitors to Hobart.
- Customs House Hotel – Dating back to 1846, this historic hotel near the Hobart waterfront has been a key part of the city's hospitality industry for over a century.

=== 10 Murray Street ===
10 Murray Street was a brutalist office building designed by Dirk Bolt and located adjacent to Parliament House. The building was a focal point of controversy and protest before its demolition in 2018, which was part of the Parliament Square redevelopment.

=== 2007 Myer Fire ===
On 22 September 2007, a major fire destroyed Myer’s Liverpool Street, with flames also affecting adjacent buildings on Murray Street. The Myer store was rebuilt as part of the Icon Complex and reopened in November 2015.

=== Friends Meeting House ===
In 1837, a weatherboard cottage at 39 Murray Street was purchased by botanist and minister James Backhouse for use as a Friends Meeting House. A sandstone structure replaced it in 1880. The site now hosts a modern office building.

== Heritage and Preservation ==
Many of the historic buildings along Murray Street have been heritage-listed, recognising their cultural and architectural significance. The demolition of 10 Murray Street sparked widespread debate about heritage preservation in Hobart, leading to a renewed interest in protecting other iconic buildings on the street.
