= Icon Complex =

ICON Complex
- Interactive map of the ICON Complex area
- Alternative names: Myer Centre
- Hotel chain: InterContinental Hotels Group

General information
- Status: Completed
- Type: Low-rise
- Architectural style: Modernism
- Location: Hobart, Tasmania, 96-108 Liverpool Street; 55-59 Murray Street
- Current tenants: Myer (Liverpool); ICON Complex (Murray)
- Groundbreaking: October 2014
- Construction started: Late October 2014
- Completed: 2020
- Opened: 3 May 2018
- Cost: $100 million
- Owner: Kalis Group

Height
- Architectural: 48.82 m (160.2 ft)
- Roof: 45.32 m (148.7 ft)

Technical details
- Floor count: 11 (above ground); 1 (below ground)
- Floor area: 27,000 m^{2} (290,000 sq ft)
- Lifts/elevators: 7
- Grounds: 3,841 m^{2} (41,340 sq ft) (including over the Hobart Rivulet)

Design and construction
- Architecture firm: Architects Designhaus; Peddle Thorp Melbourne Pty. Ltd.
- Structural engineer: Gandy & Roberts
- Services engineer: JMG

Other information
- Number of stores: 40
- Number of anchors: 1 (Myer)
- Number of rooms: 235
- Number of bars: 1 rooftop bar
- Facilities: conference facilities
- Parking: Street

The ICON Complex is a low rise building in Hobart, Tasmania, situated in the city's centre. ICON Complex has access on two main street fronts, Murray and Liverpool. The Myer department store is situated on Liverpool Street, replacing the Myer lost on the same site in 2007. The Liverpool Street site consists of the ICON Complex shopping centre, boasting many national and international brands including Mecca Maxima and Scotch & Soda.

ICON Complex will mark InterContinental Hotels Group's entry into the Tasmanian market with the 235-room Crowne Plaza Hobart.

Stage 1 opened in November 2015 and Stage 2 opened in May 2018. It has internal links on two floors into the Cat and Fiddle Arcade.

== History ==
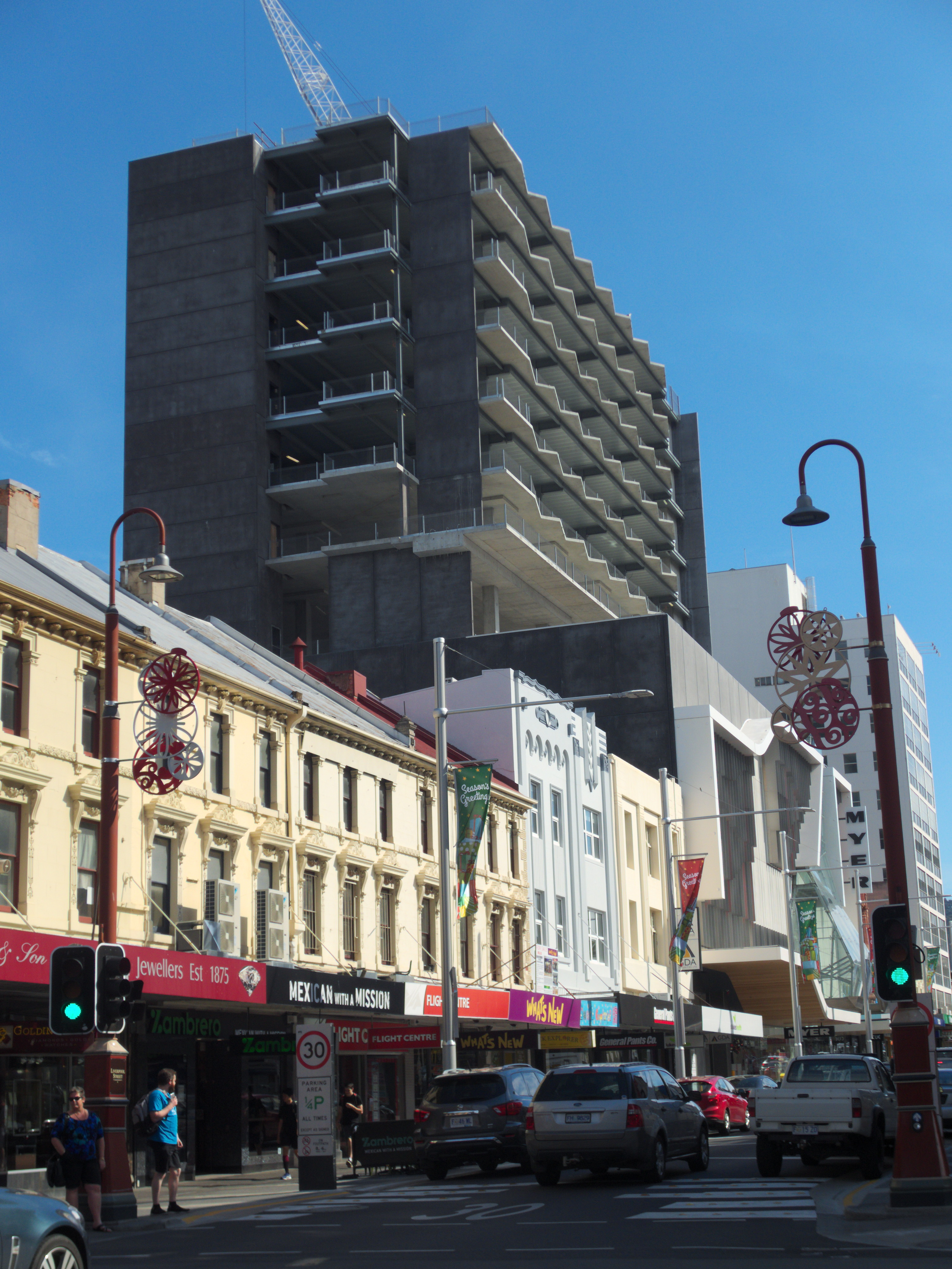
Construction in 2017

Being relatively small compared to interstate capital cities, the city of Hobart long drew a sense of its identity from the Myer department store. Occupying 8,000 m^{2} (86,000 sq ft), with frontages on both Liverpool and Murray streets, it was known as Hobart's Anchor store. In 2007, a fire destroyed the larger, Liverpool street section of Myer.

== See also ==
- List of tallest buildings in Hobart
