= Hobart Rivulet =

River in Tasmania, Australia

Hobart
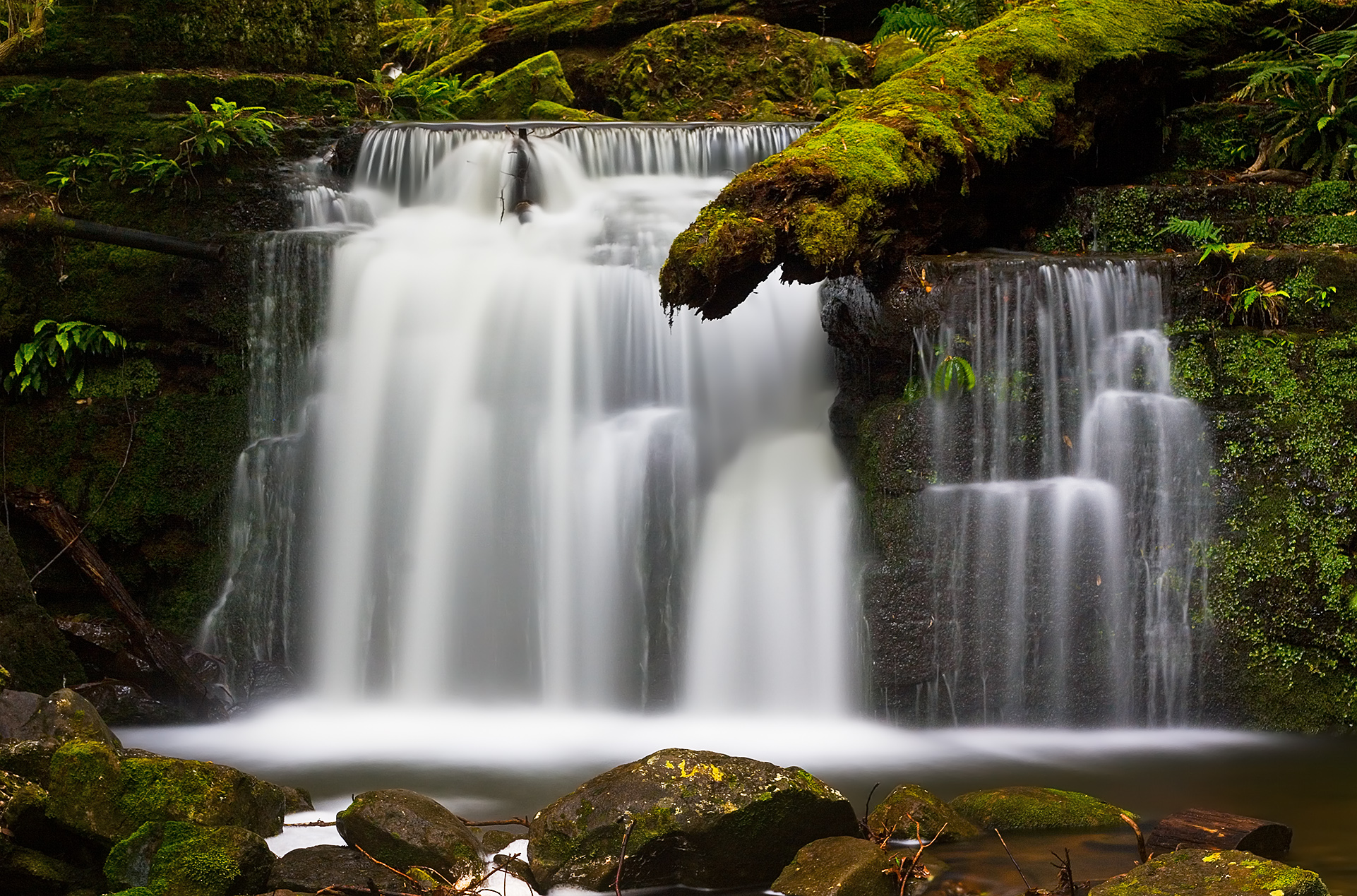
- Strickland Falls on the upper Hobart Rivulet

- Location of the river mouth in Tasmania

Location
- Country: Australia
- State: Tasmania
- Region: South East

Physical characteristics
- Source: kunanyi / Mount Wellington
  - coordinates: 42°54′26″S 147°14′49″E
  - elevation: 566 m (1,857 ft)
- Mouth: Urban stream flowing into the River Derwent
  - location: Hobart
  - coordinates: 42°52′38″S 147°20′22″E
  - elevation: 22 m (72 ft)
- Length: 7 km (4.3 mi)

Basin features
- River system: Derwent catchment

The Hobart Rivulet, part of the River Derwent catchment, is an urban stream located in the Hobart hinterland and flows through and underneath the city, in Tasmania, Australia.

== Course and features ==
The rivulet rises on the slopes of Mount Wellington and flows generally northeast over O'Grady's Falls, Strickland Falls, through South Hobart and past what was known as the World Heritage-listed Cascades Female Factory towards the Hobart central business district. As a result of urban development, the natural course has been altered significantly. While the mouth of the rivulet originally emptied into Sullivans Cove, the lower portion of the rivulet has been piped through the city and runs below the central city area. The rivulet emerges again near the Royal Hobart Hospital on Collins Street before flowing underneath the Cenotaph and emptying into the Derwent. The rivulet descends 544 metres (1,785 ft) over its 7.3-kilometre (4.5 mi) course.

Regular tours of the rivulet once took place under the CBD.

The sandstone Wellington Bridge (1841) over the rivulet lies under the Elizabeth Street Mall, and is visible through a viewing portal there. Other bridges across the rivulet include the Harrington Street Bridge built in 1844, and the Molle Street Bridge built in 1866.

== History ==
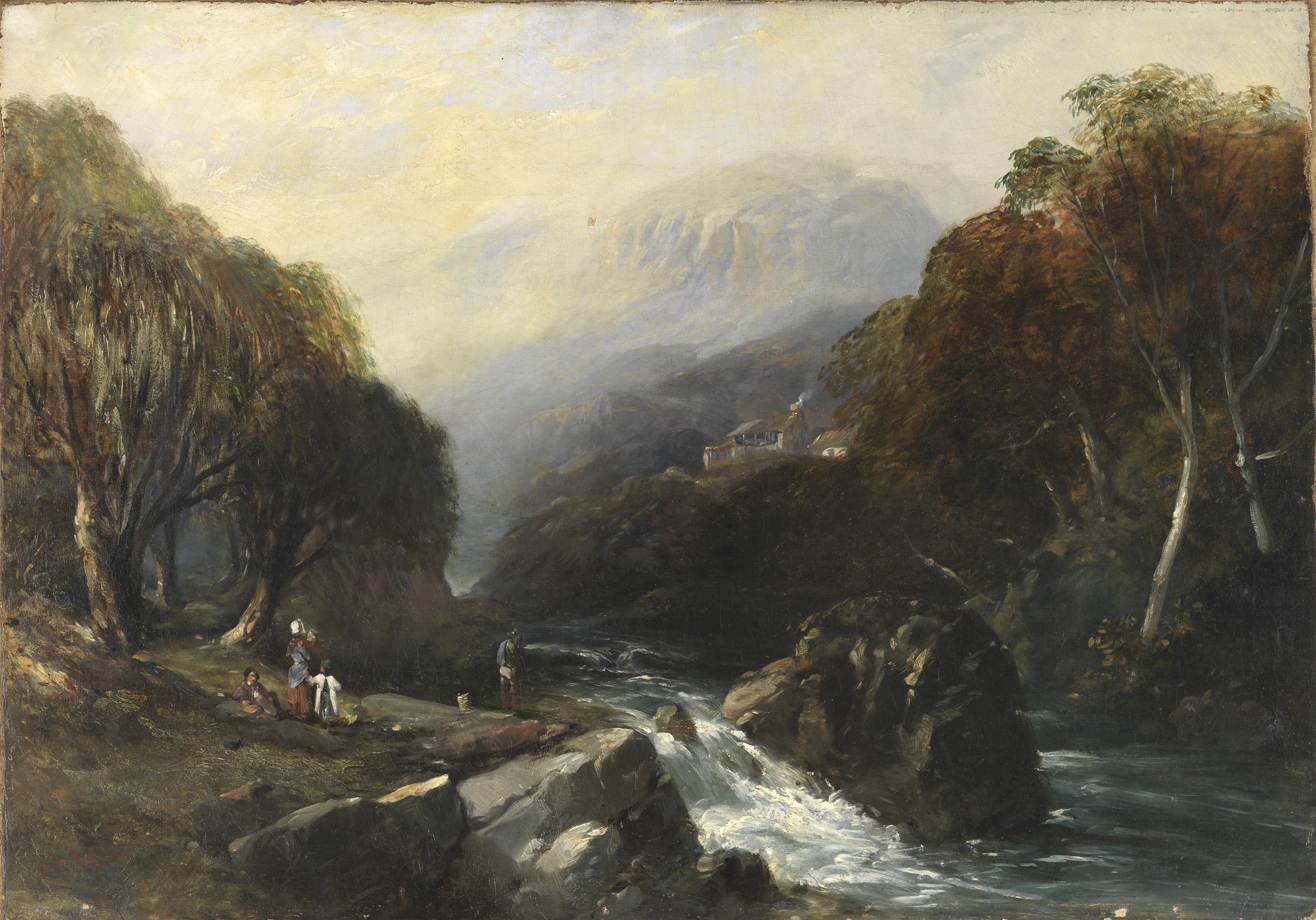
Hobart Town Rivulet and Mount Wellington by John Skinner Prout (1847)

The rivulet was an important source of drinking water for the Mouheneener Aboriginals, and later for the first European settlers. The site for Hobart was originally chosen in part due to the availability of fresh water from the rivulet, with the water at Risdon Cove, the original settlement, proving unsuitable. Because of the pure water of the upper portion of the rivulet, the Cascade Brewery was built beside it. In the early 1820s there were multiple flower mills on its lower reaches, and later steam powered factories, making it an important source of energy for early industry in Hobart.

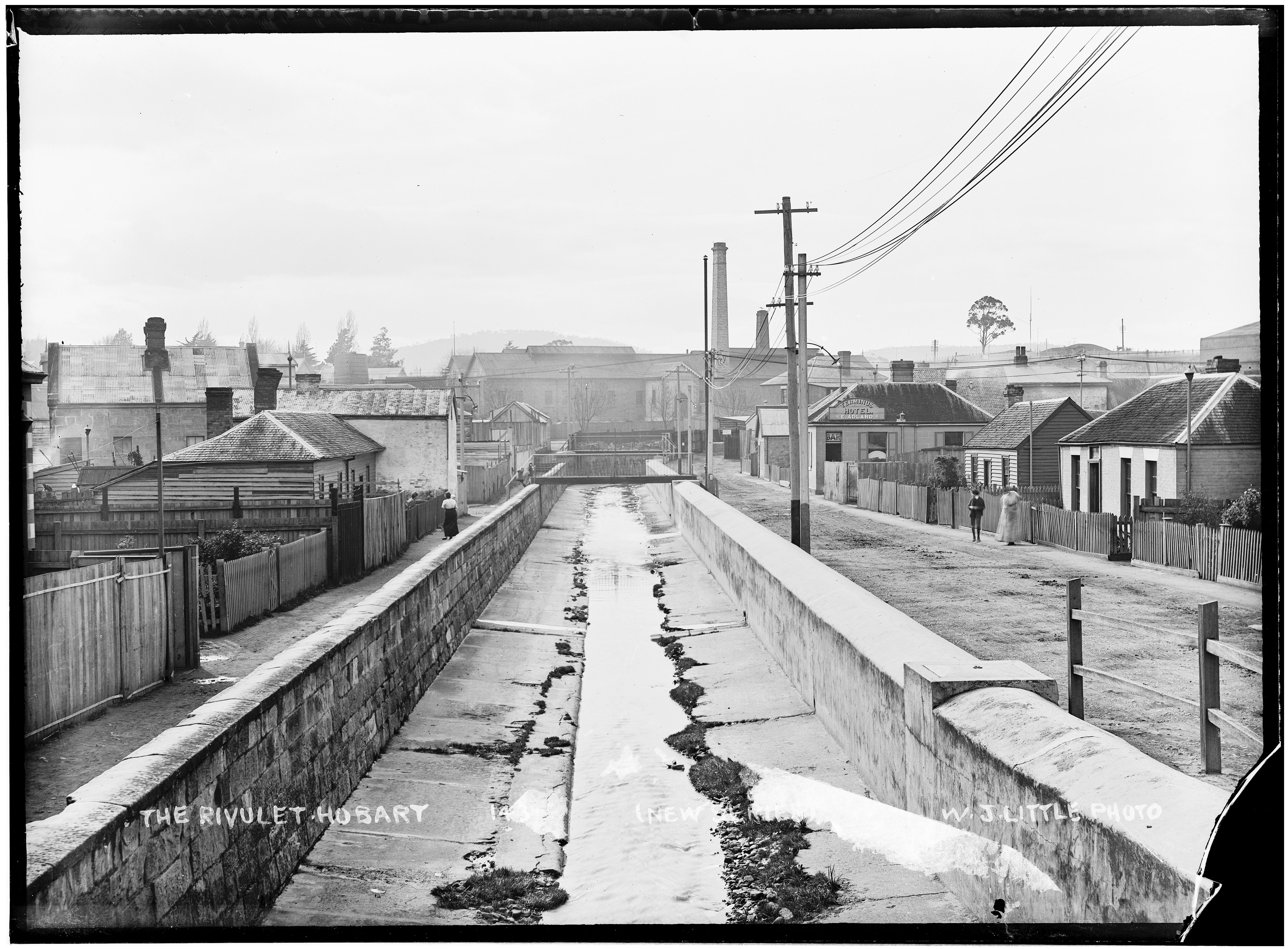
The Hobart Rivlet near Little Collins Street in 1914

During the early days of the settlement, efforts were made to keep the rivulet clean, but by the 1820s the Hobart Town Gazette reported that "disgusting pollutions" were being thrown into the stream, and by the 1840s it was being used as a sewer.

As the town grew, bridges were built over the rivulet and parts of it gradually moved underground.

There were several typhoid epidemics during the late 19th century due to poor water quality further downstream.

In recent years the underground sections have become somewhat popular for urban explorers.

== Ecology ==
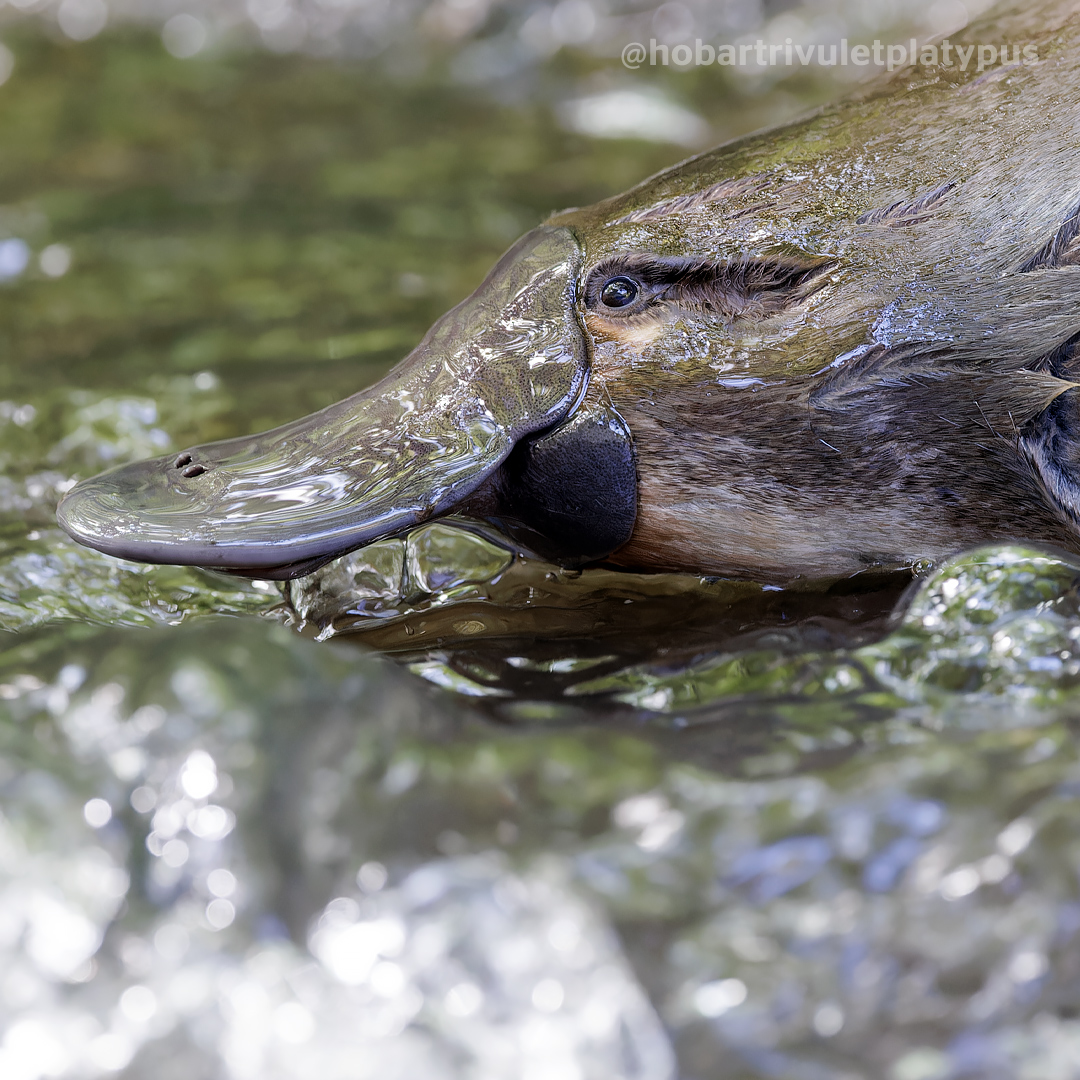
The Hobart Rivulet's celebrity resident.

In June 2023, the City of Hobart published its first ever 'State of our Rivulets' report. Hobart Rivulet was found to be healthier upstream than downstream, degrading gradually from its naturally forested headwaters to its urbanised mouth, where the rivulet enters the River Derwent.

In 2024 a project was launched to remove invasive crack willow from the rivulet and revegetate the banks with natives.

=== Platypus population ===
The Hobart Rivulet is home to small population of urban platypus. A community organisation, Hobart Rivulet Platypus, was founded to raise awareness of the ecology of the rivulet, which was managed primarily as a storm drain. Pollution restricts the platypus population to upstream areas. Growing public awareness of the platypus population has led to better care of waste entering the rivulet.

== Gallery ==
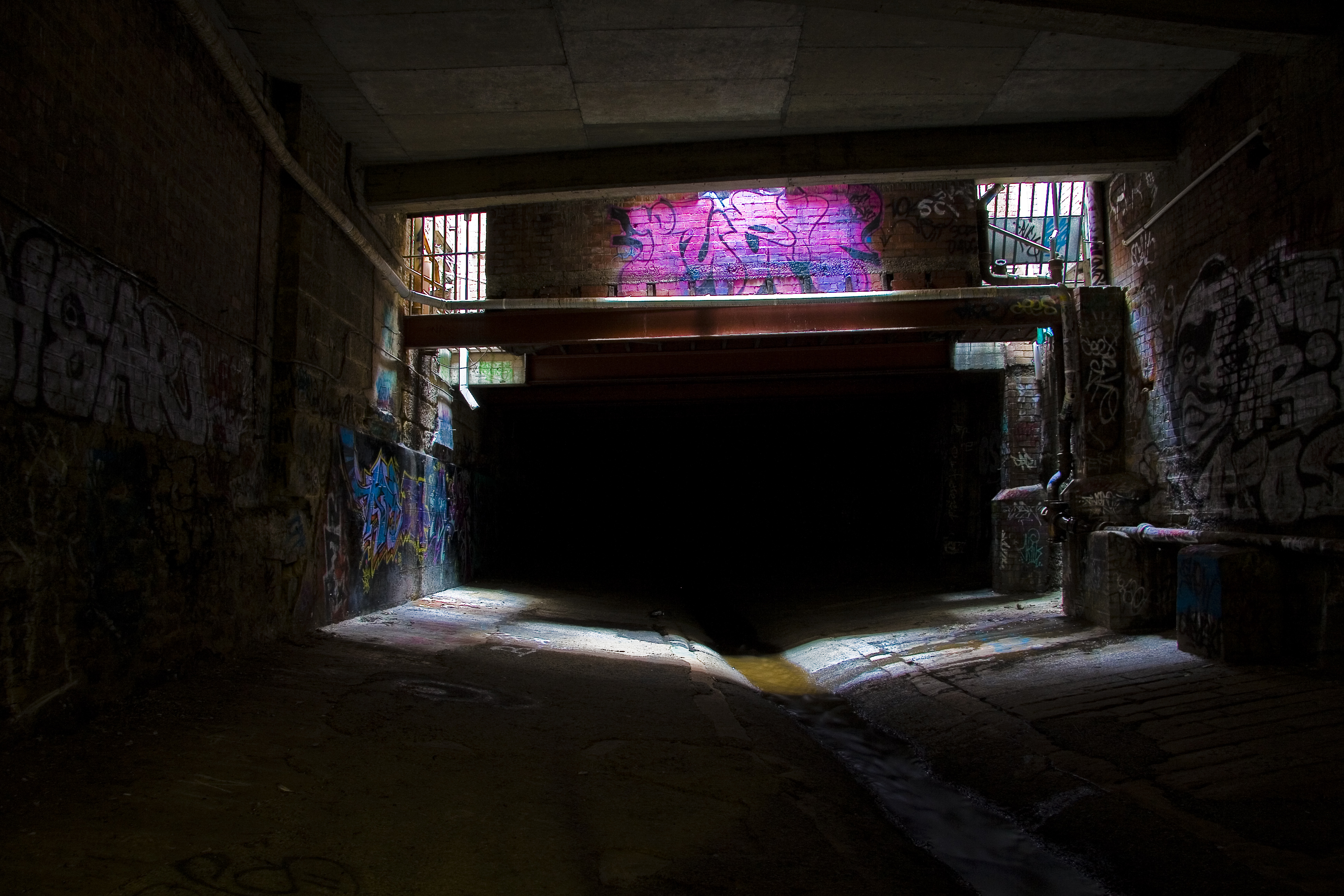
Underneath Hobart

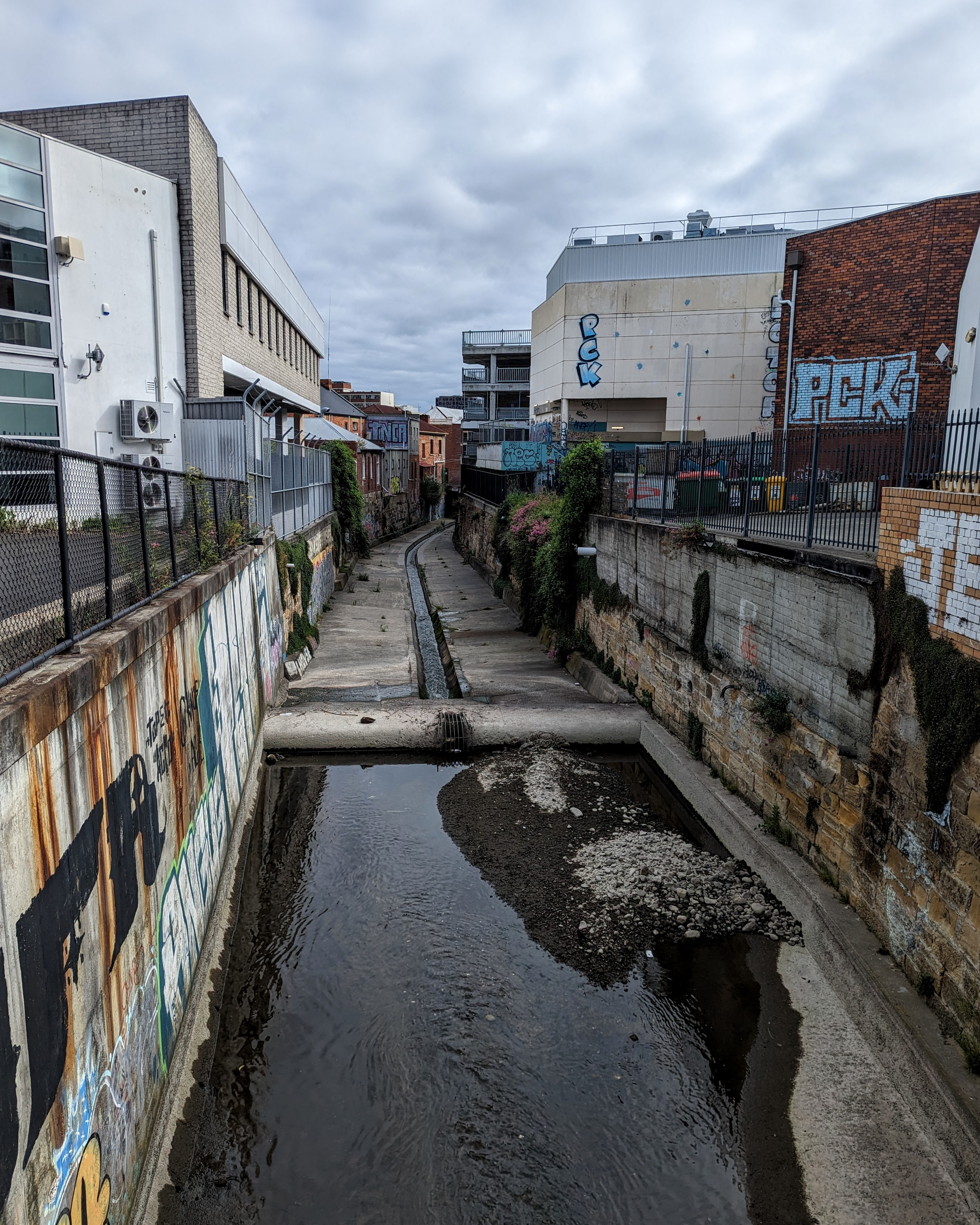
At Barrack Street

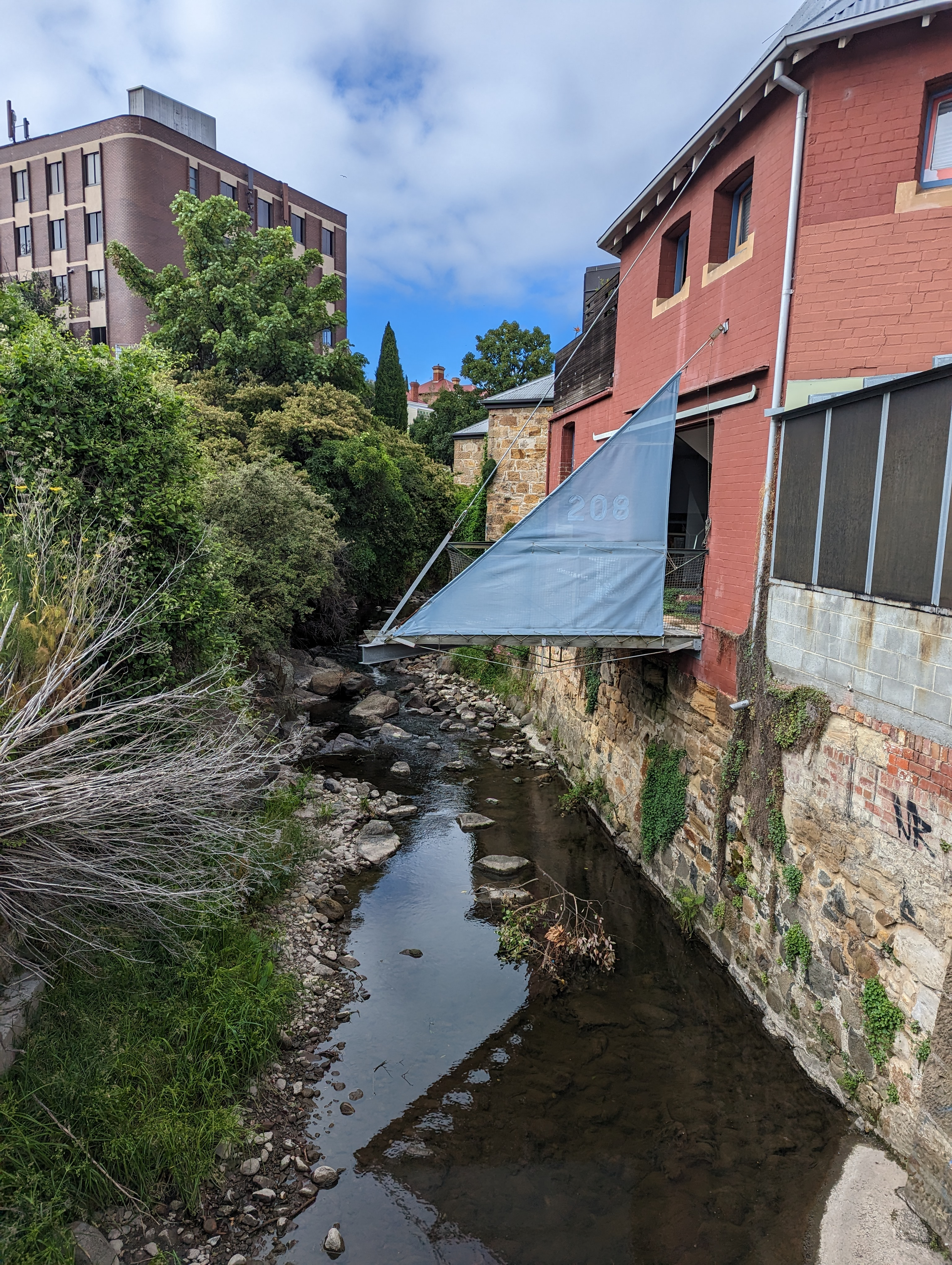
At Collins Street

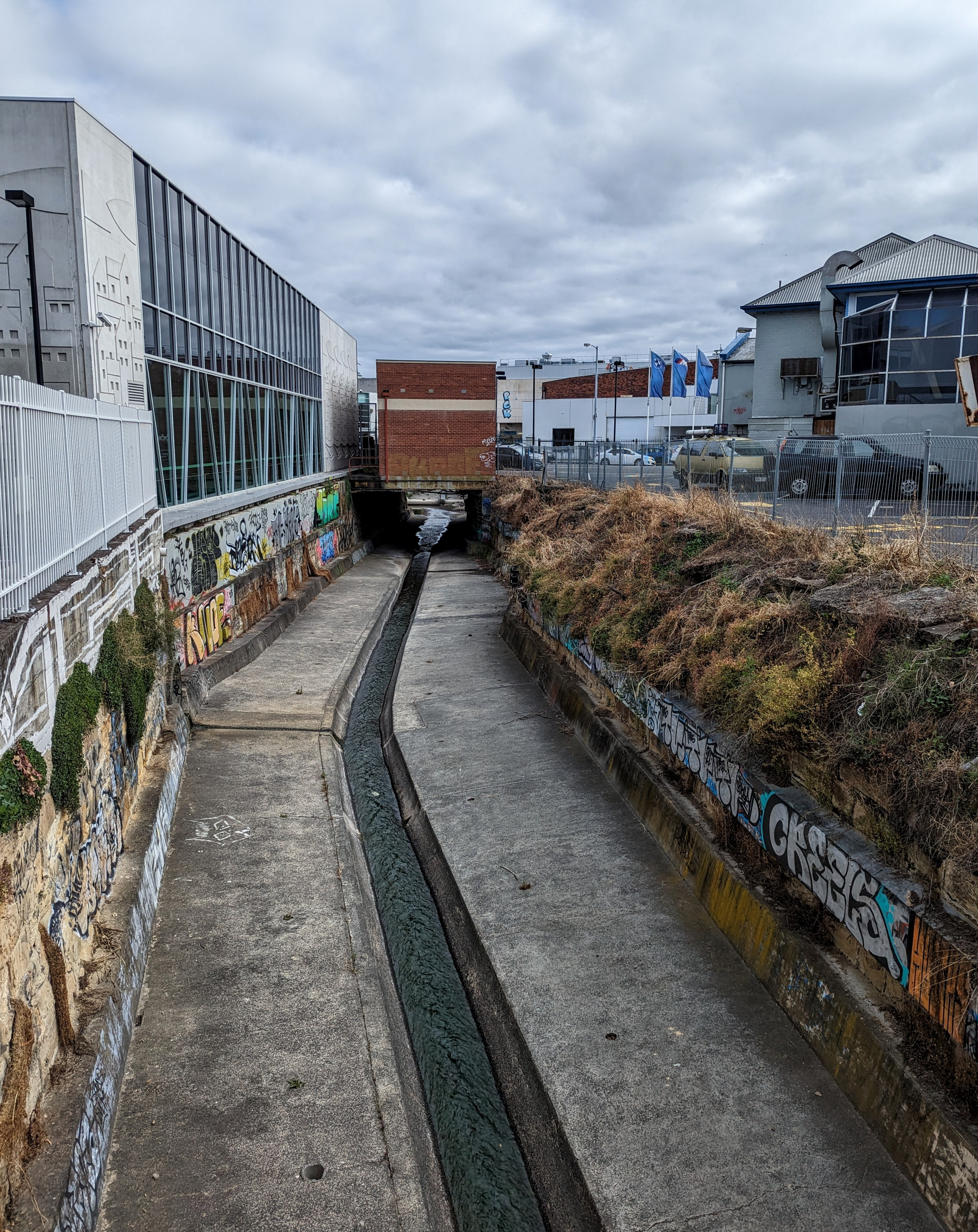
At Collins Street

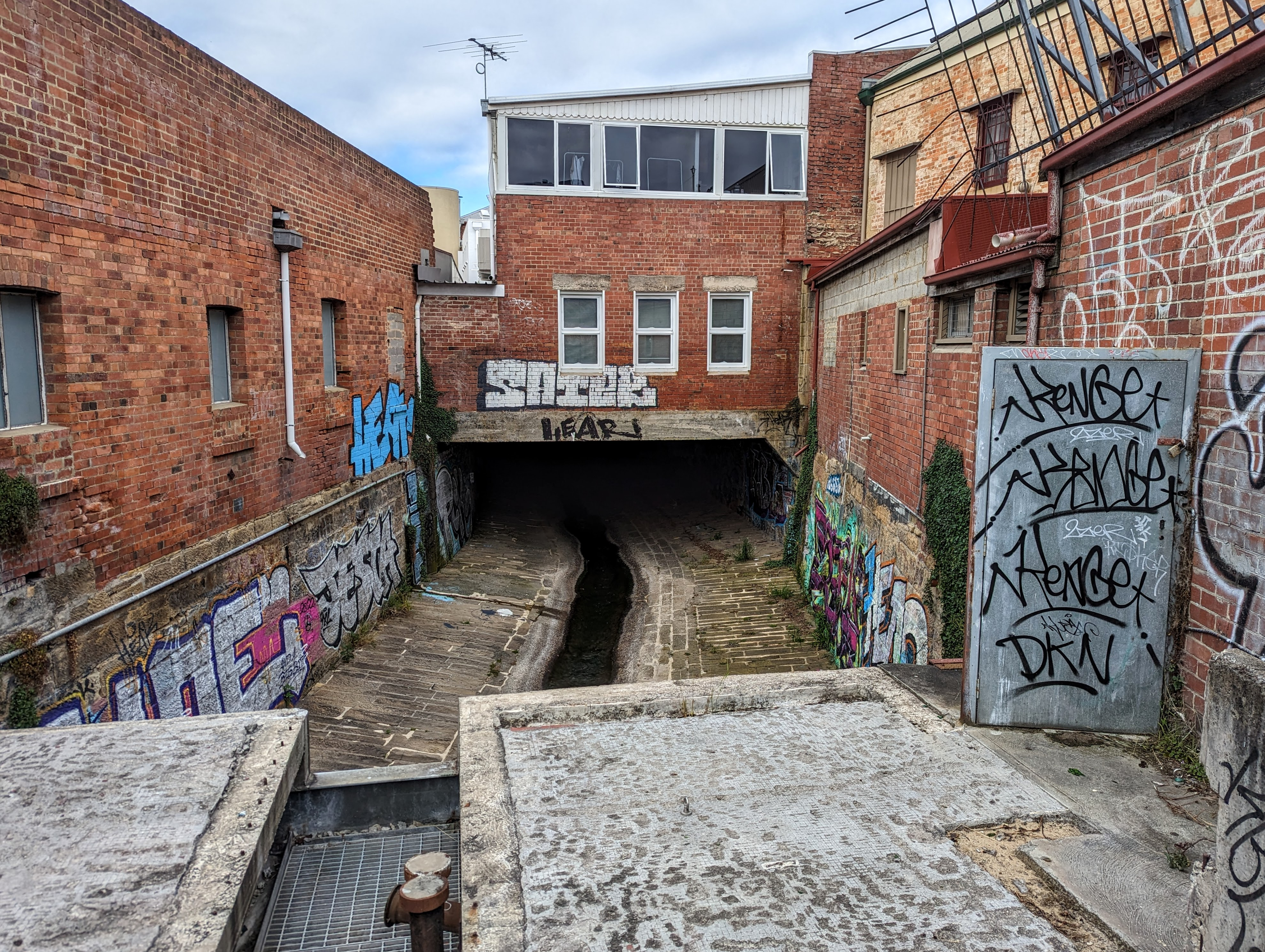
At Harrington Street

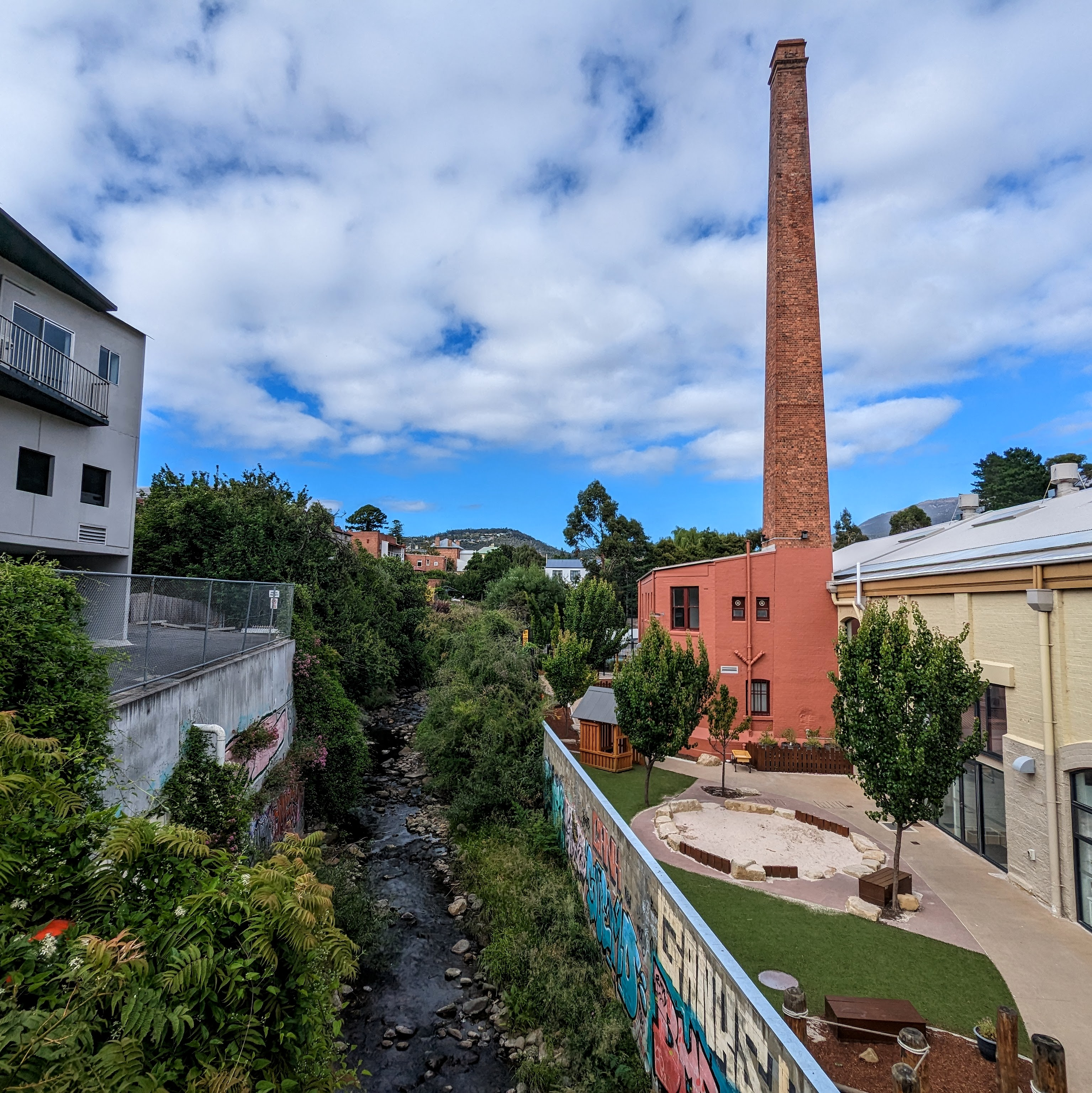
At Molle Street

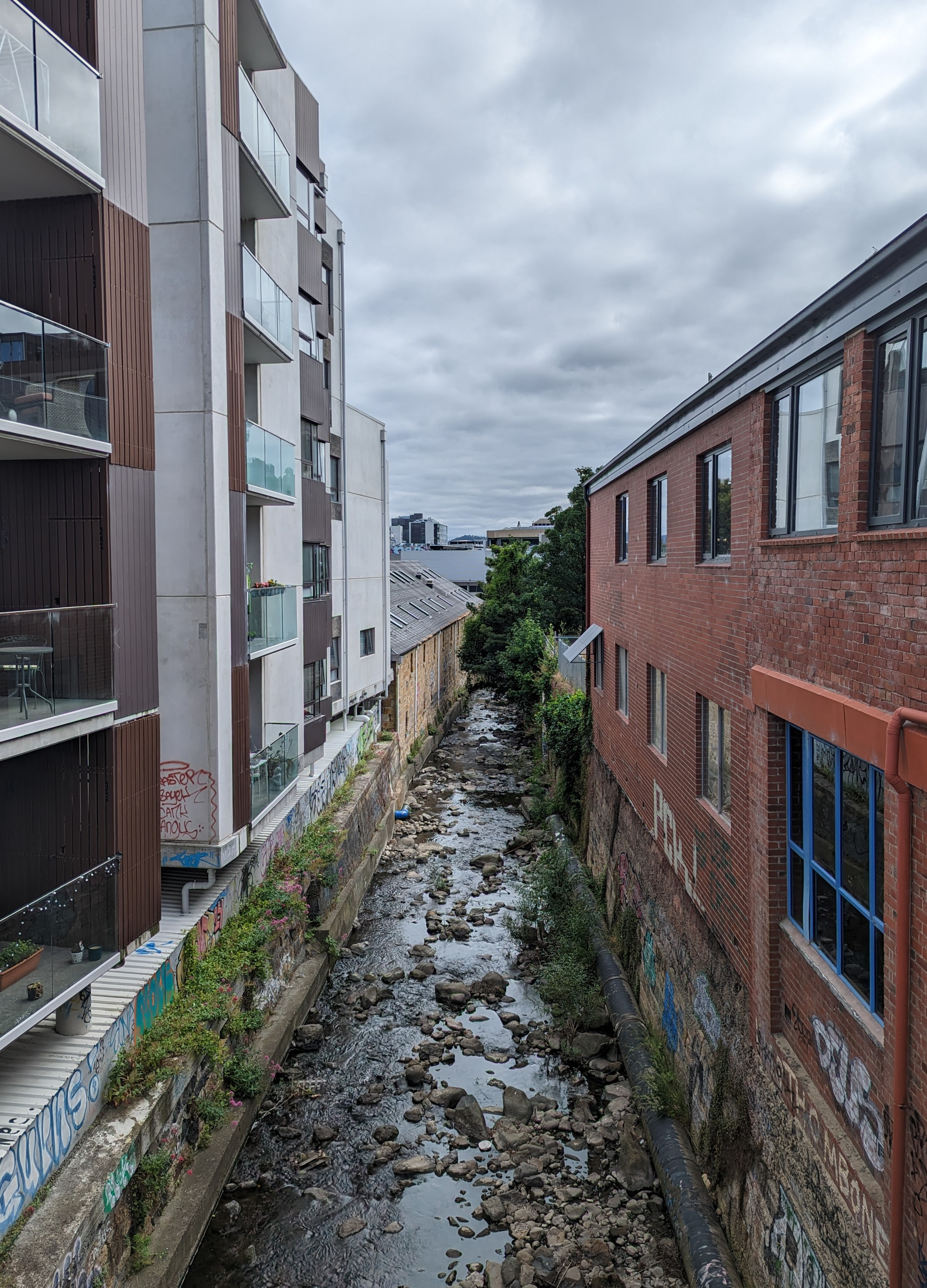
At Molle Street

== See also ==
- List of rivers of Australia § Tasmania
