= Barrack Street, Hobart =

Street in Hobart, Tasmania

Barrack Street Tasmania

General information
- Type: Street
- Length: 900 m (0.6 mi)

Major junctions
- North-West end: Patrick Street
- South-East end: Davey Street, Linden Avenue

Location(s)
- Suburb(s): Hobart CBD

Barrack Street is a street in Hobart, Tasmania, Australia. The Hobart Town military barracks were once located on this street.
