= 1929 Tasmanian floods =

Natural disaster in Tasmania, Australia

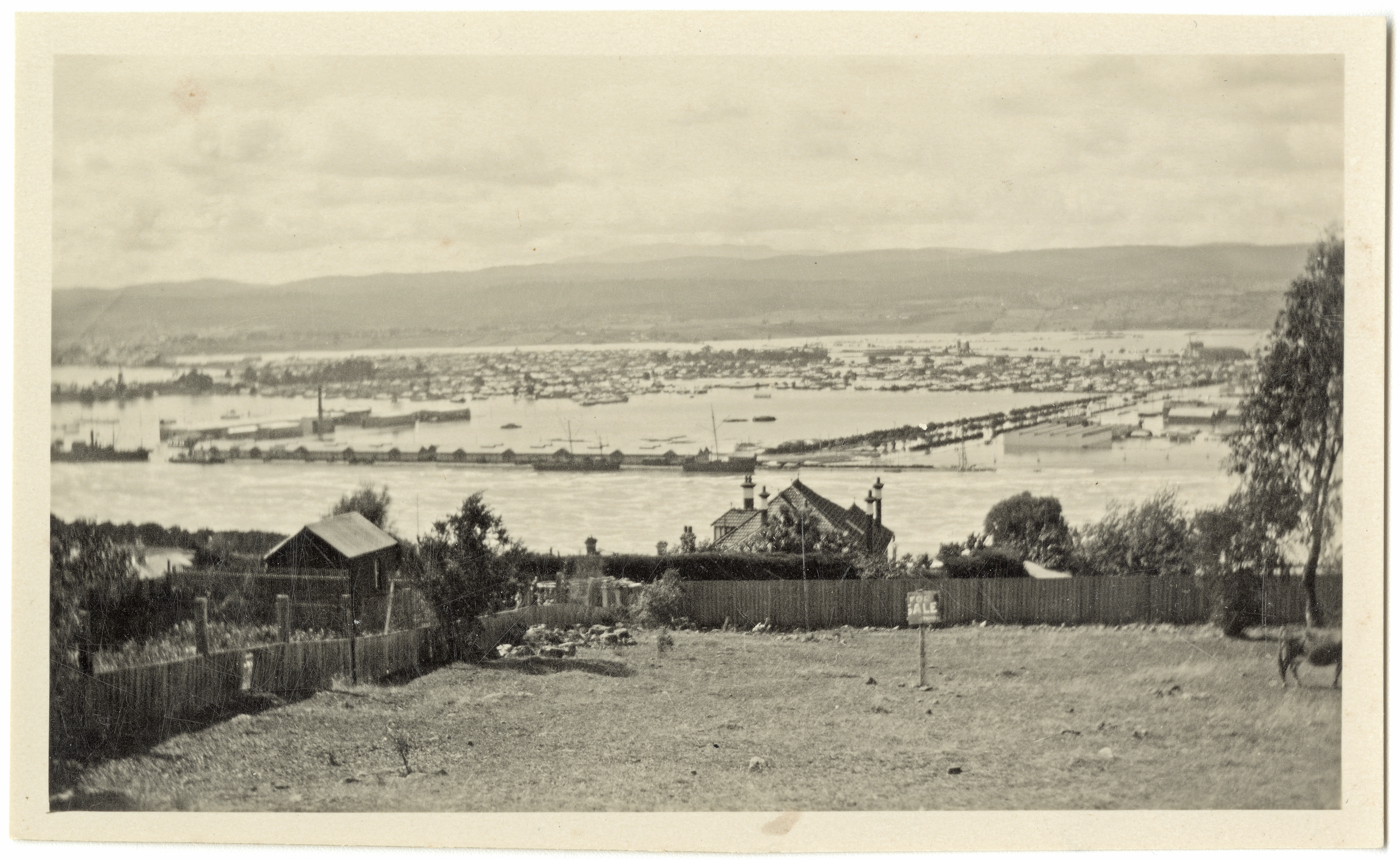
The flooding of the suburb of Invermay as seen from across the river.

The 1929 Tasmanian floods were the most deadly floods on record in Tasmania's history. They occurred in April 1929, with 22 people were killed and 40 injured.

They became known as the "great" floods and the generosity from other states in relief funds and work was invoked for some time after.

The floods helped to prompt the construction of flood levees in Launceston, Tasmania's second-largest city and an important economic centre in the north of Tasmania.

Flooding was predicted by barometers: "Barometers are now falling, due apparently to the southward movement of the depression, and further rain is to be expected, with the probable flood falls in the north-east." A deep low-pressure cell over Victoria at 9 am, Thursday 4 April 1929 produced north-easterly winds across Tasmania. Rain intensified throughout the day, with the highest rainfall totals coming in the north-eastern corner of the state, but the effects were also felt across the north of the state directly affecting Burnie.

Hobart paper, The Mercury reporting about the flood in Derby (a north-eastern mining town) below a failed dam:

...thousands of tons of water rushed at terrific speed down the narrow gorge to the township, uprooting trees and moving boulders of many tons weight as it passed. The first warning was given, apparently by the Assistant Manager of the mine (Mr. W. A. Beamtish) as the waters came in sight, traveling at terrible speed, and so far as is known, Mr. Beamish, who is numbered among the seven men who were reported last night to be missing, was able to warn only those people who were in the mines office before it was overwhelmed, and he himself was carried away.

The floods and their impact were widely reported.
