= Collins Street, Hobart =

Road in Hobart, Tasmania

Collins Street Tasmania
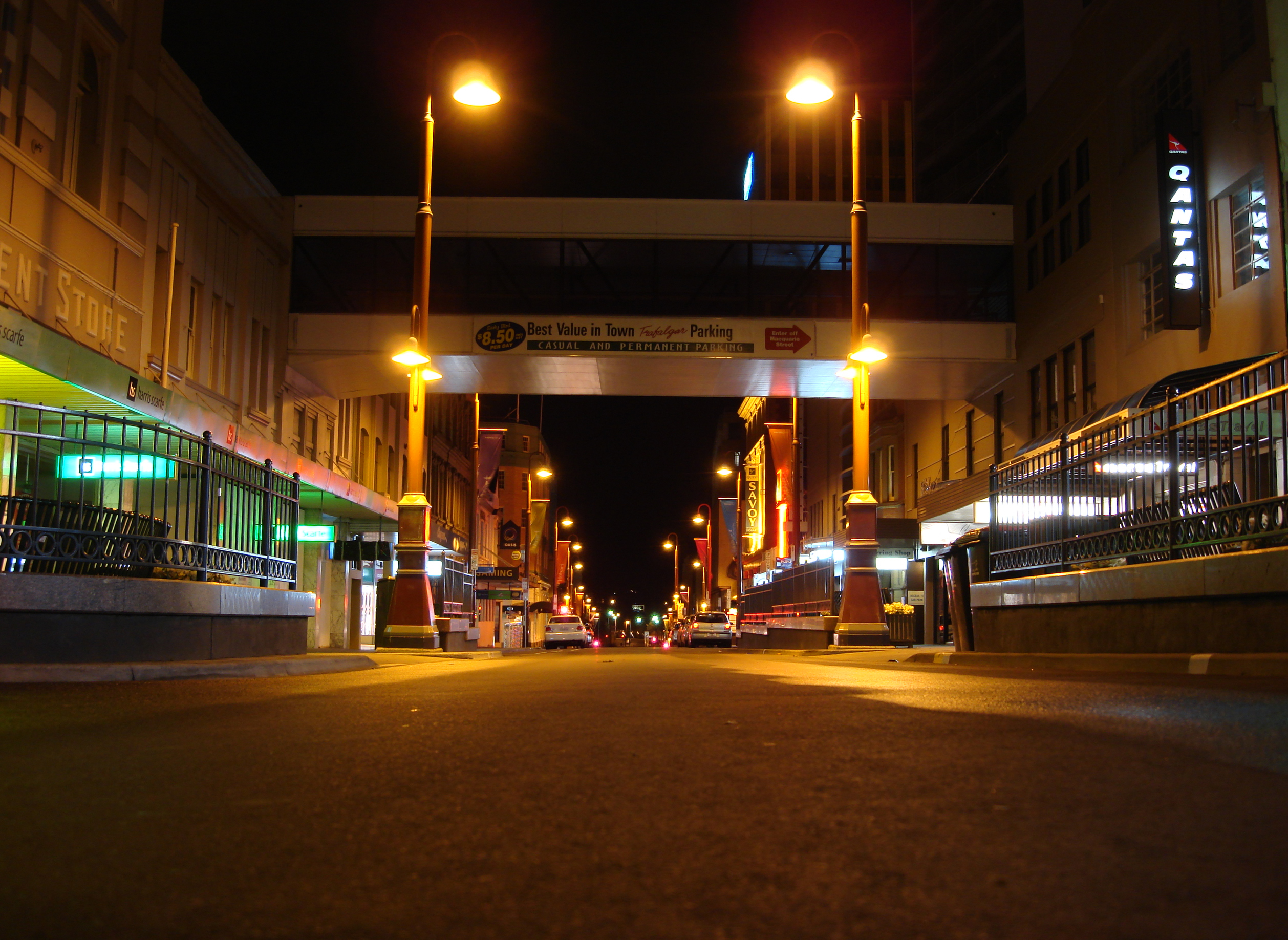
- Collins Street at night
- Coordinates: 42.8833334°S 147.3272911°E

General information
- Type: Street
- Location: Hobart
- Length: 1.35 km (0.8 mi)

Major junctions
- North-East end: Brooker Avenue
- South-West end: Molle street

Collins Street is a one-way street in Hobart, Tasmania. The street was named after the founding Lieutenant Governor of the Colony of Van Diemen's Land, David Collins.

== Gallery ==
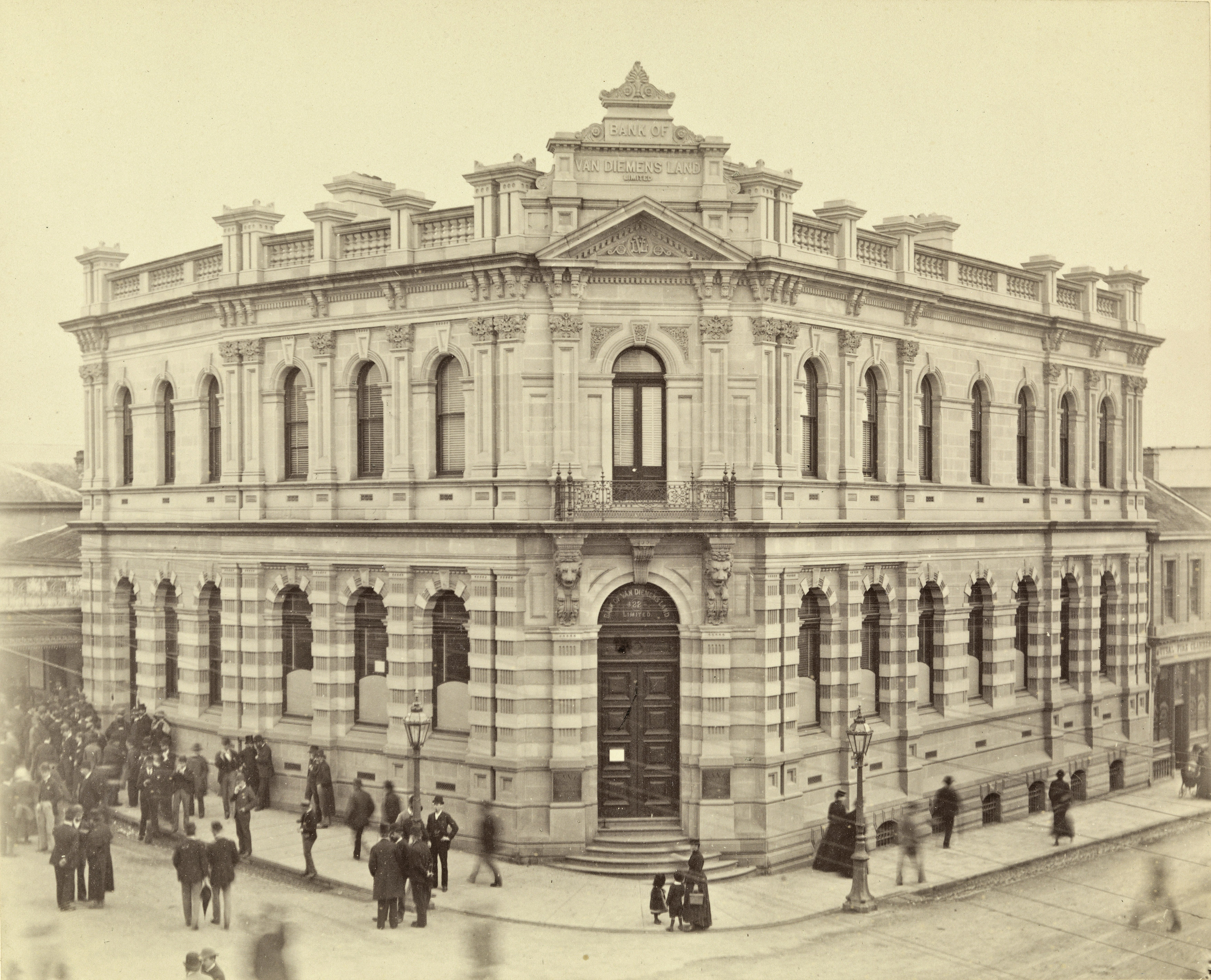
Bank of Van Diemen's Land building once they closed their doors on 3 August 1891.

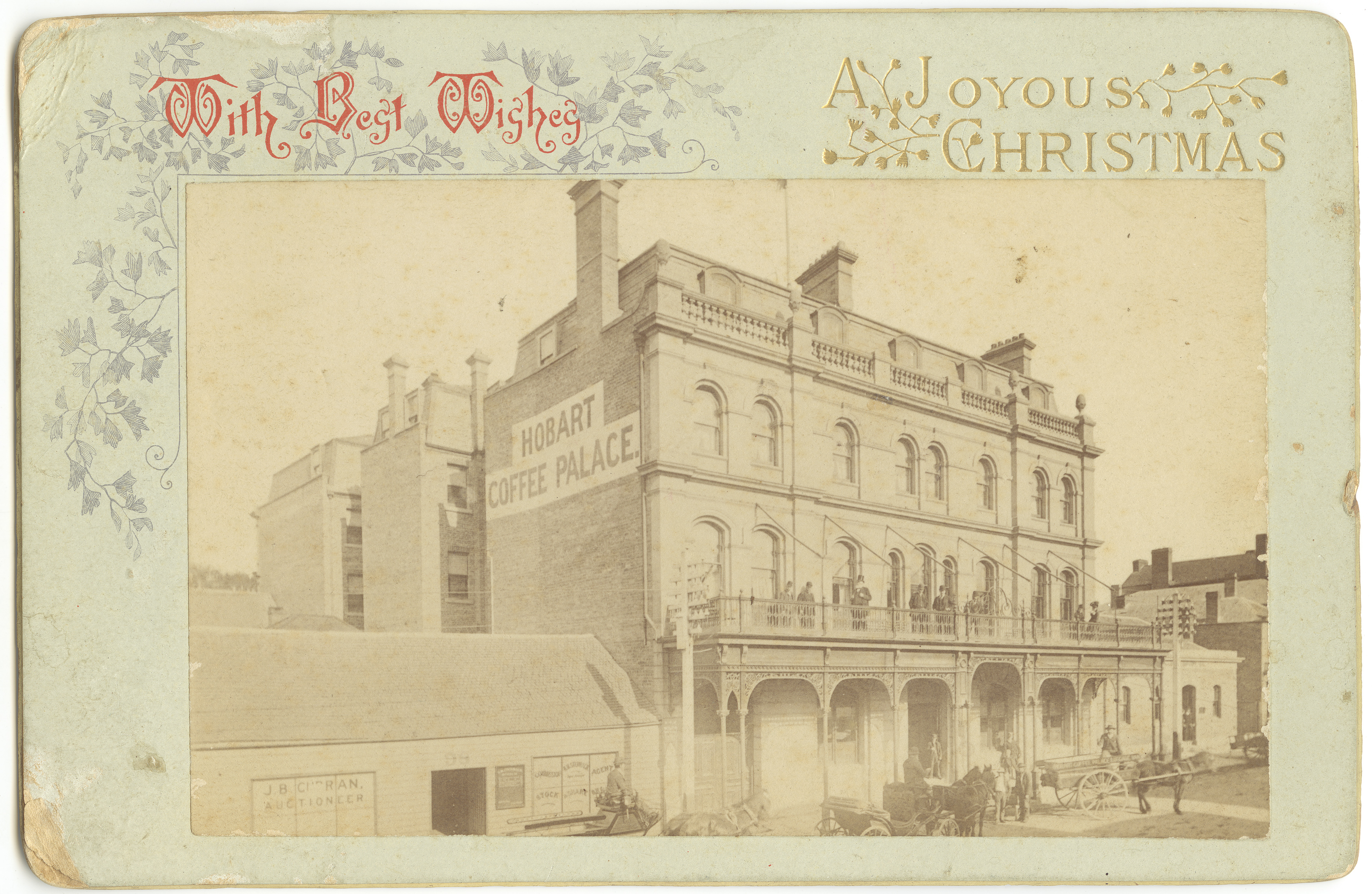
Imperial Hotel

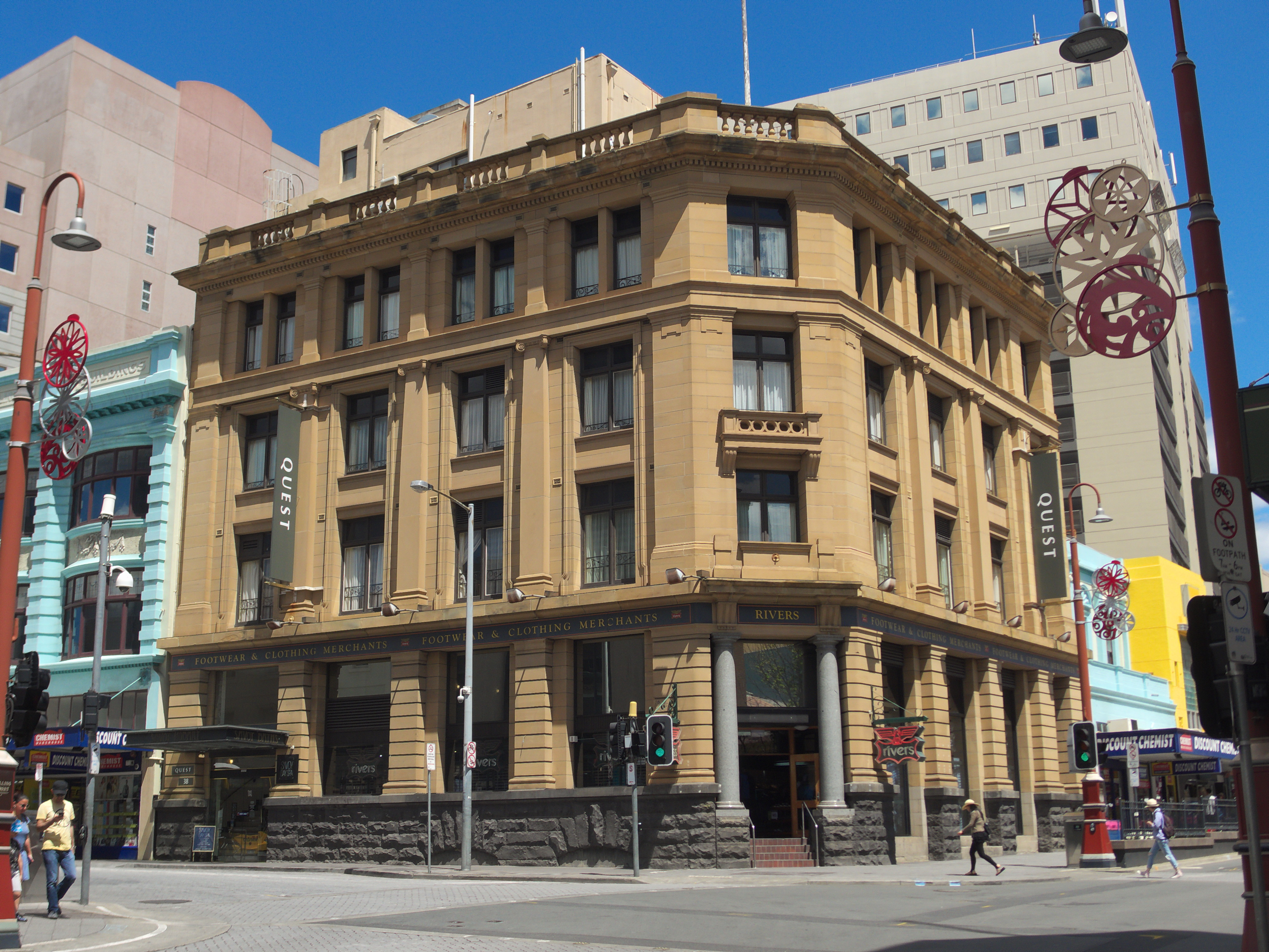
38 Elizabeth Street at the intersection of Collins Street completed in 1918

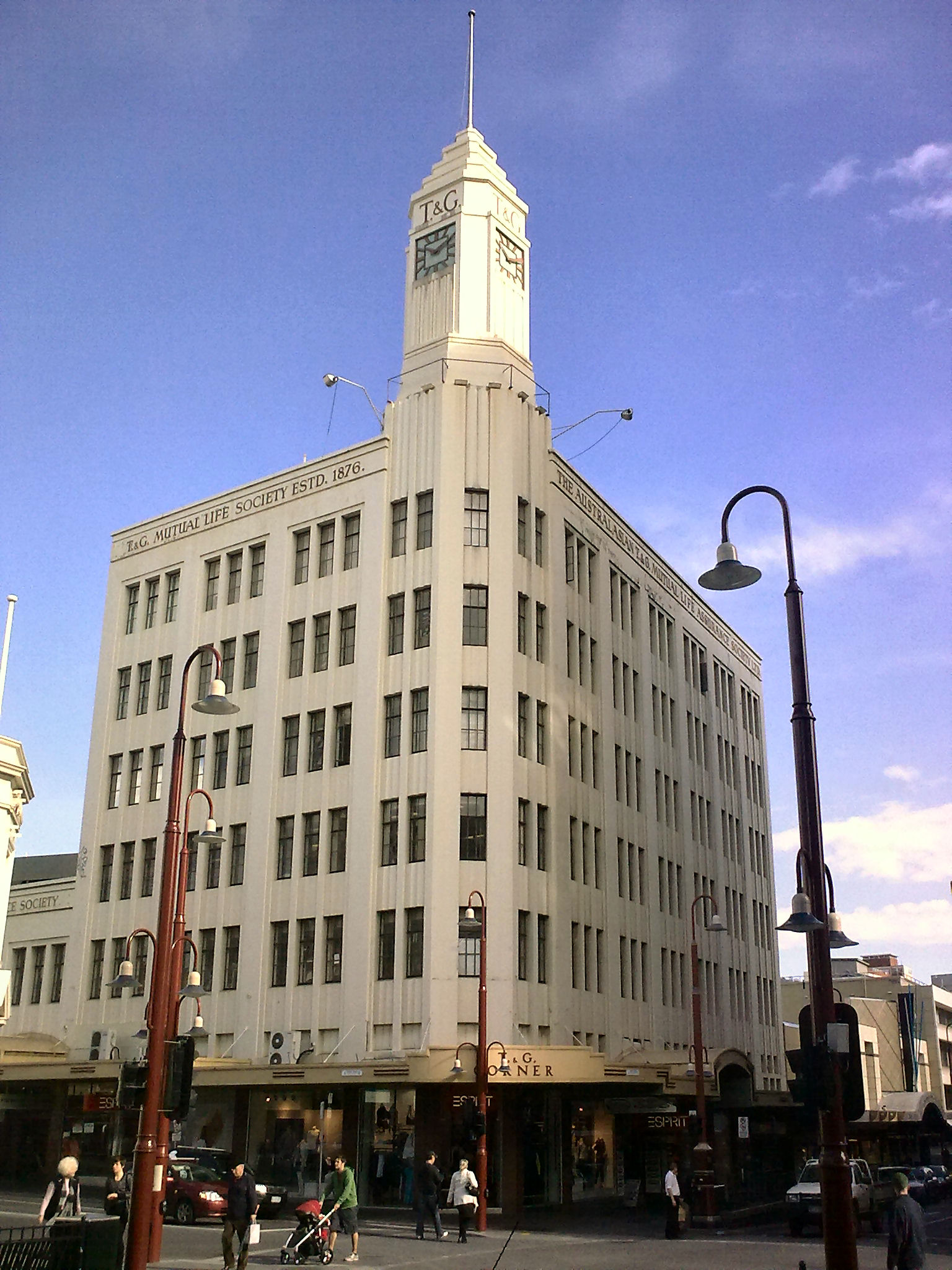
T&G Building at the intersection of Murray Street and Collins Street

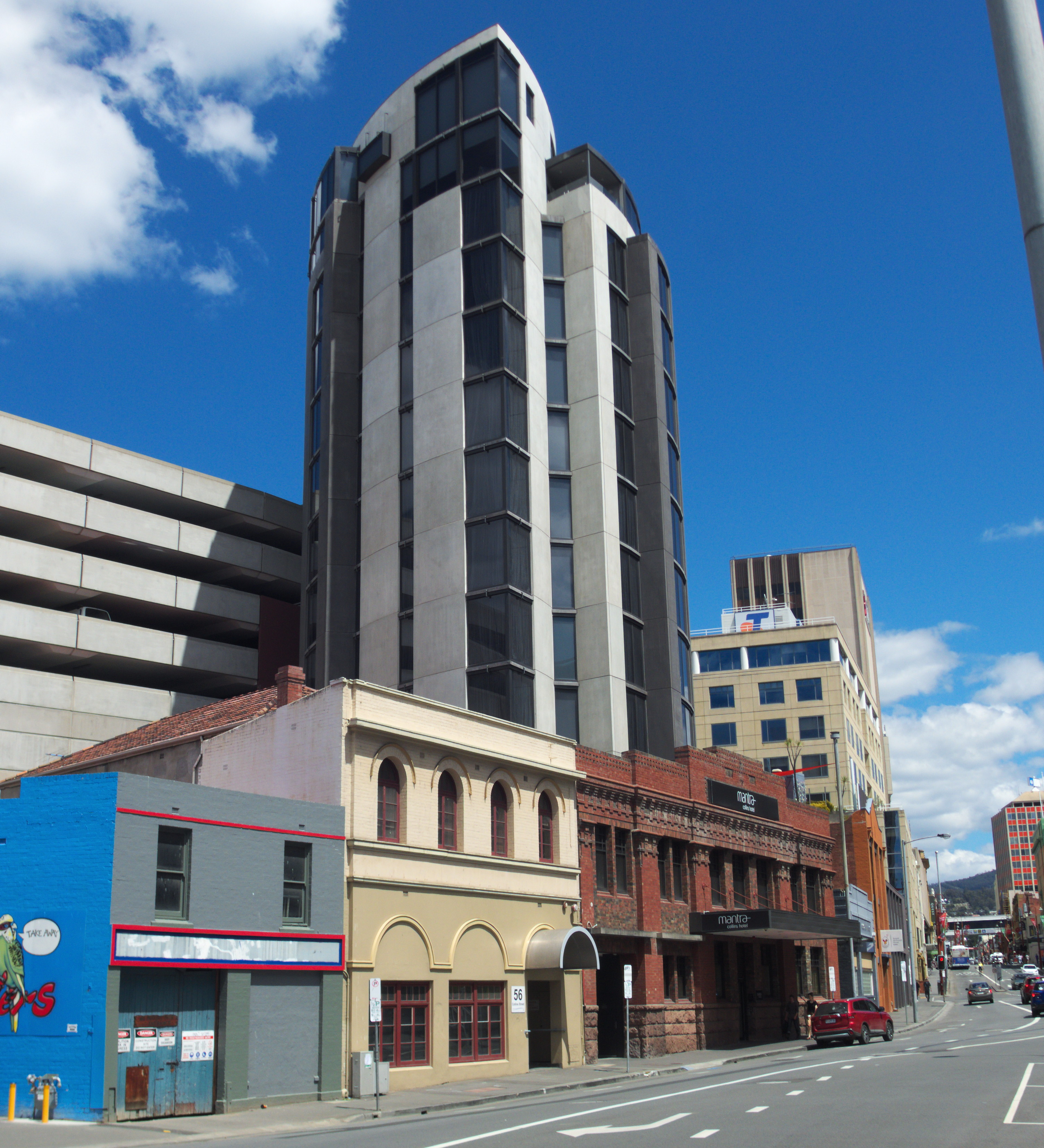
Mantra Collins Hotel

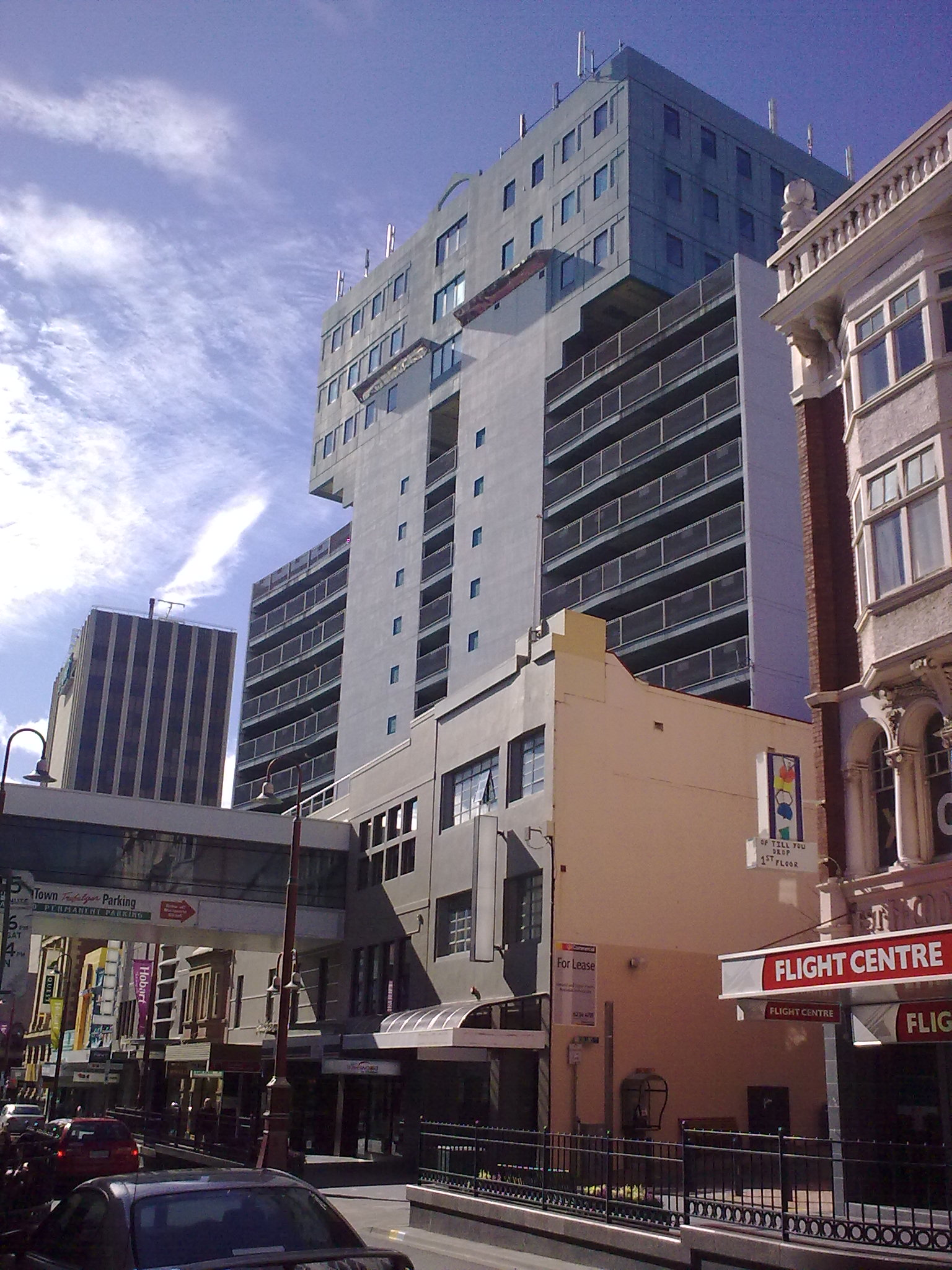
Trafalgar Building, Collins Street view

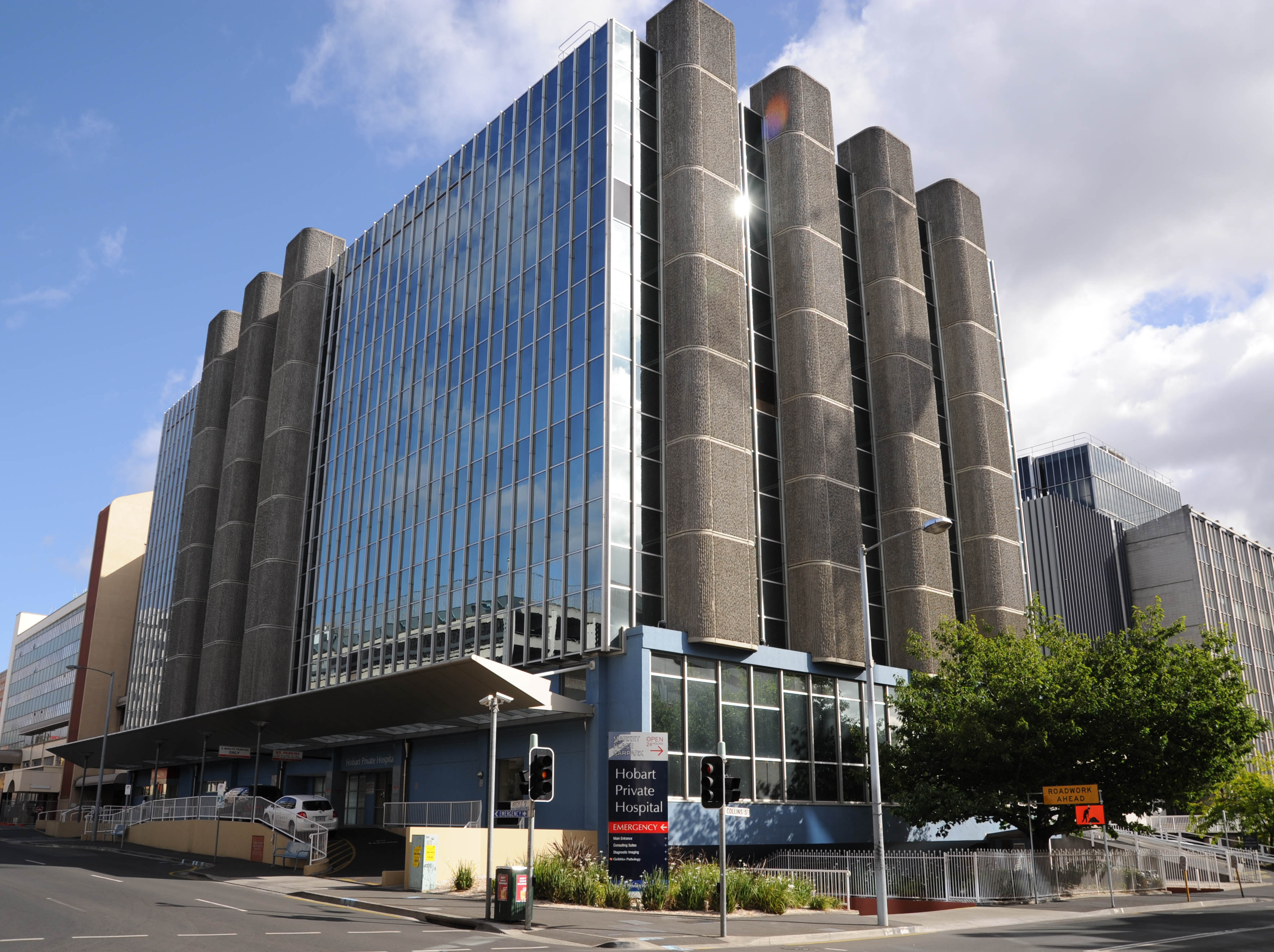
Hobart Private Hospital

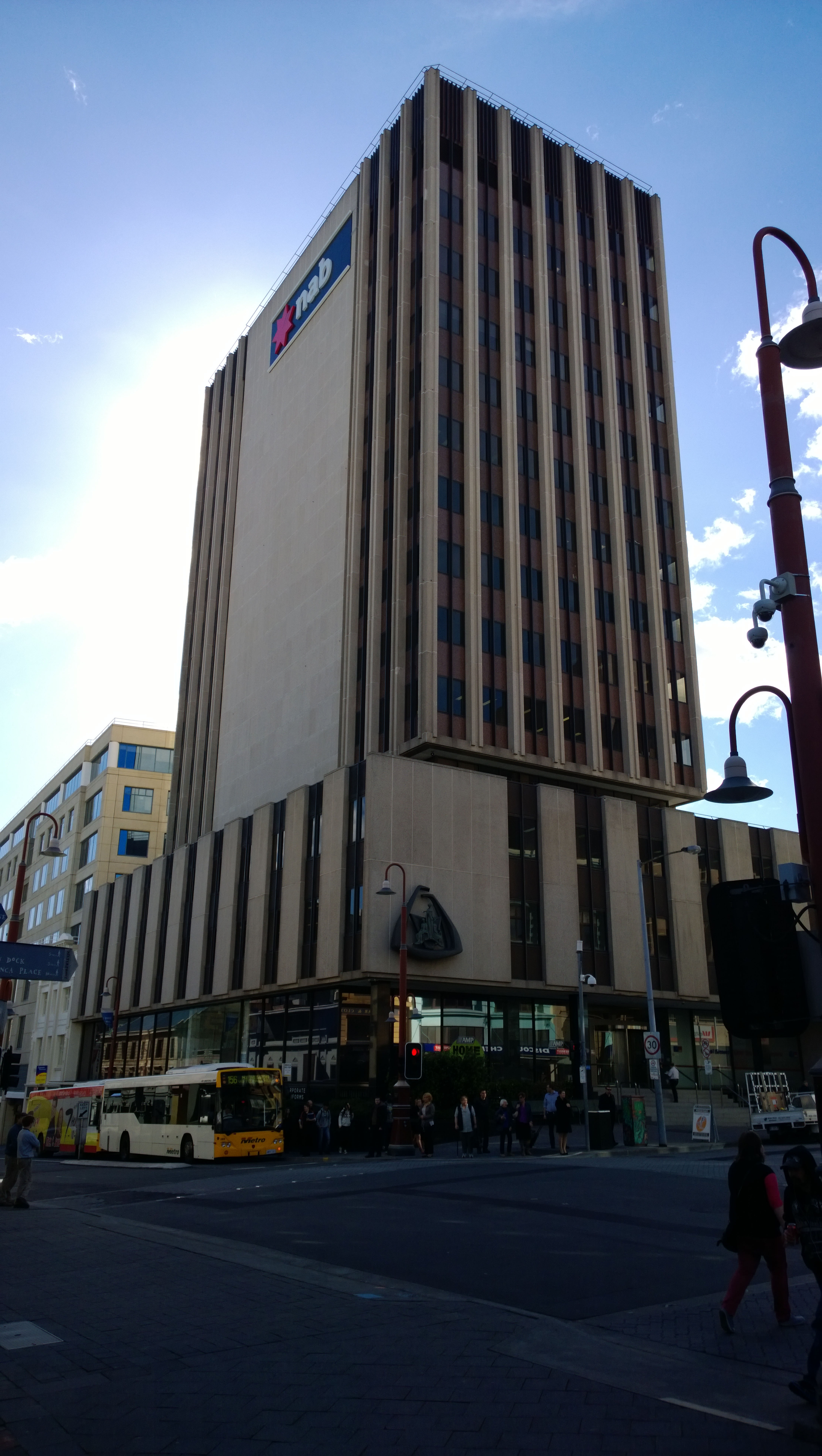
NAB Hobart

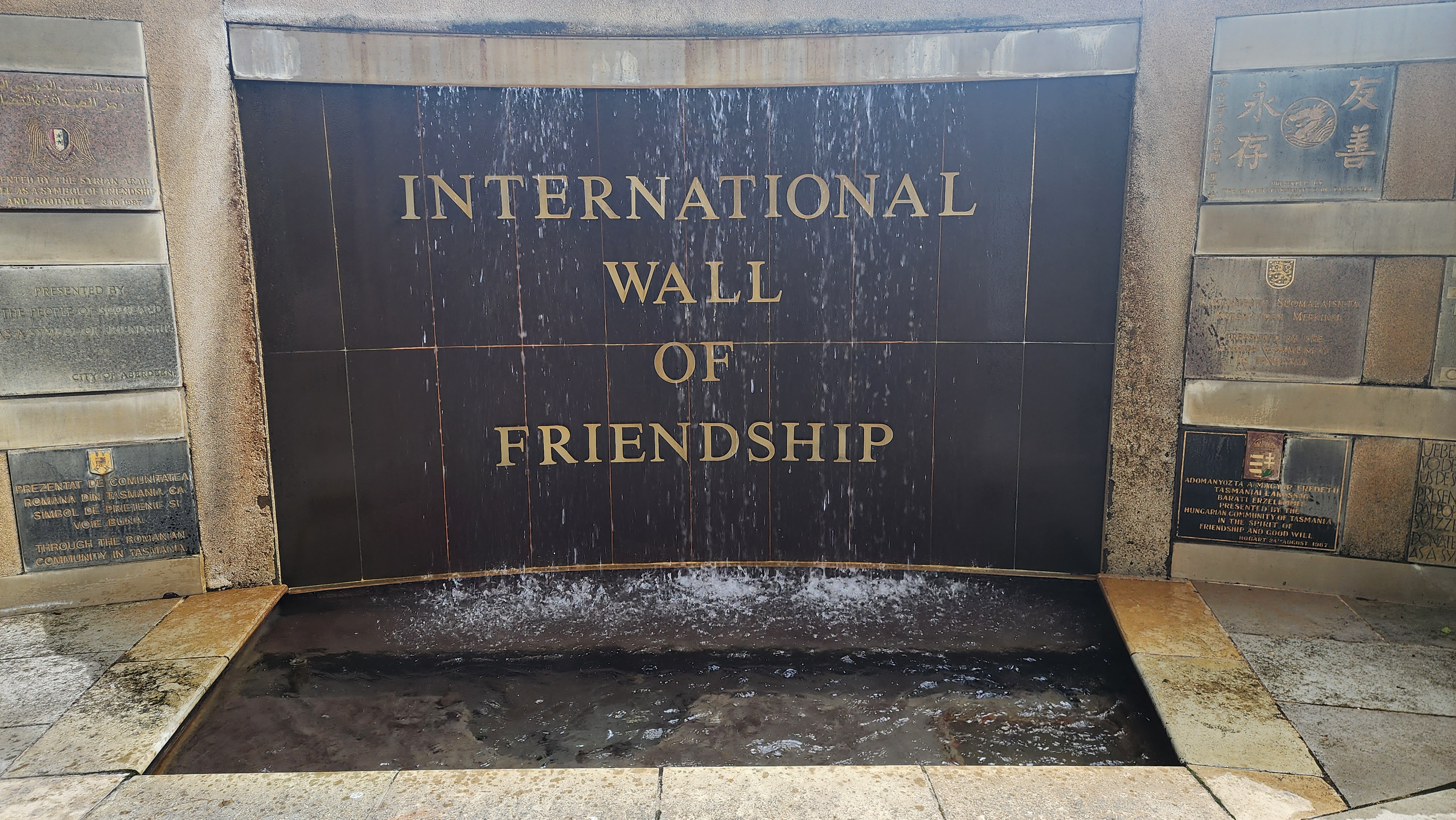
International Wall of Friendship at 188 Collins Street

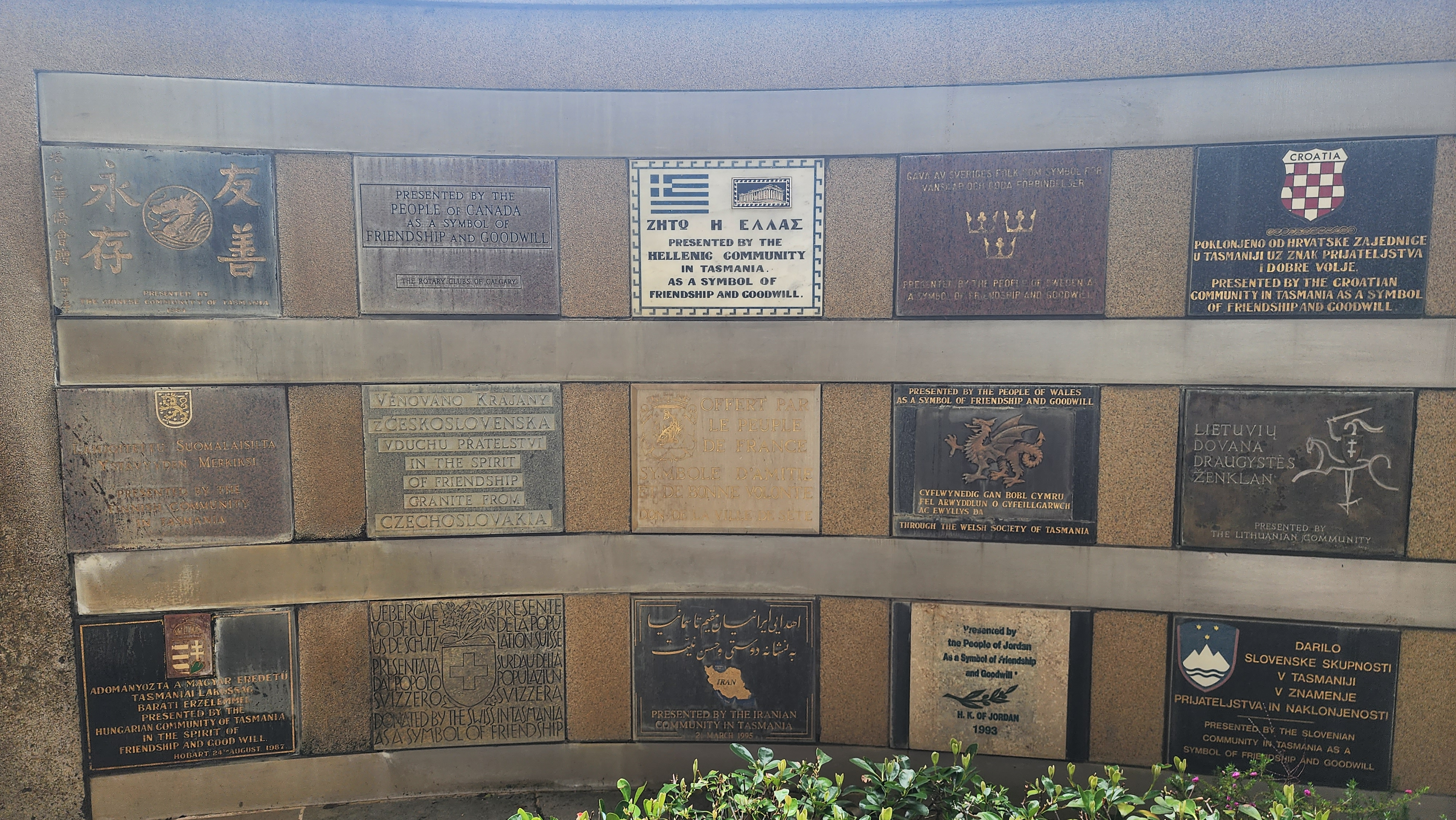
Tiles on International Wall of Friendship
