= Hobart Bus Mall =

Bus interchange in Hobart, Tasmania

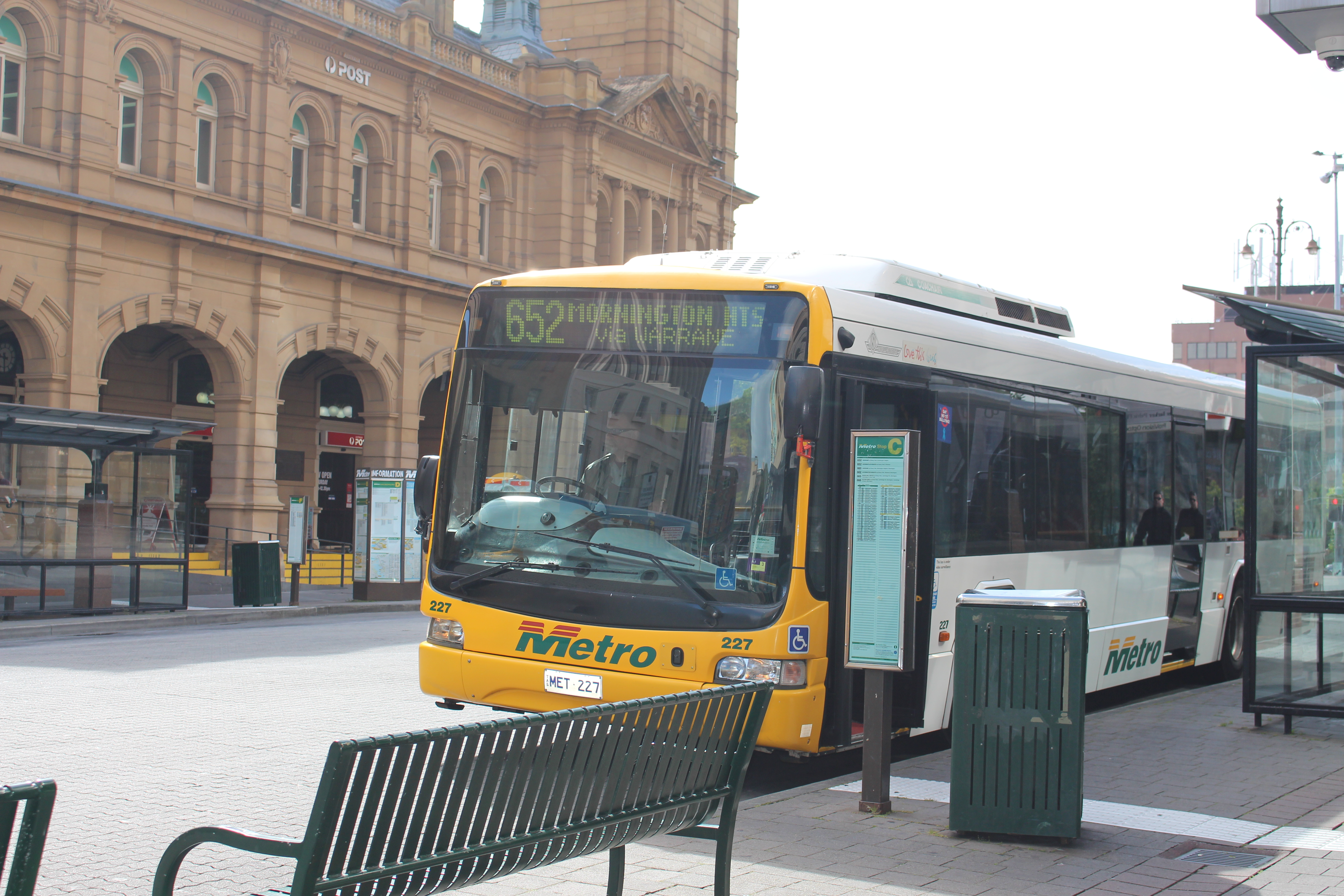
- Metro bus in the bus mall, Elizabeth Street, 2014

General information
- Location: Elizabeth Street; Macquarie Street; Liverpool Street
- Coordinates: 42°52′56.9″S 147°19′46.4″E
- System: Bus interchange
- Owner: City of Hobart
- Operator: Metro Tasmania
- Platforms: 12
- Connections: Coach (Murray Street); Ferry (Brooke Street Pier); SkyBus (Brooke Street Pier)

Construction
- Parking: No
- Cycle facilities: Yes
- Accessible: yes

History
- Former names: GPO Terminus
Location

The Hobart Bus Mall (also called the Hobart City Interchange) is the main urban bus interchange for Metro Tasmania in the Hobart central business district. Situated on Elizabeth Street, it serves daily commuters from suburbs, nearby cities, and towns including Clarence, Glenorchy, Richmond, Cambridge and Kingborough. The interchange spans Elizabeth Street between Macquarie and Collins streets, with additional bus stops at Franklin Square and one on Liverpool Street near the Elizabeth Street Mall's north end. The interchange is within 500 metres (1,600 ft) of connecting coach services (operated by Tassielink) on Murray Street, ferry services and airport bus services (operated by SkyBus) at Brooke Street Pier.

== History ==
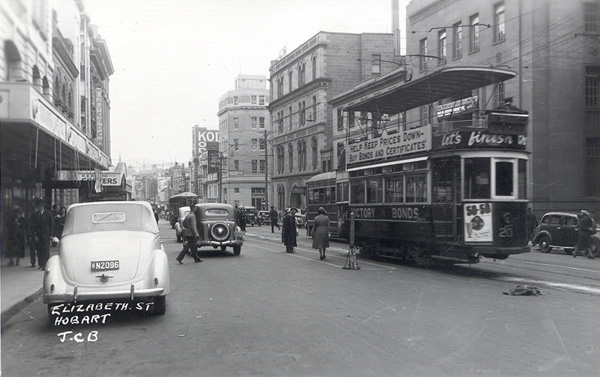
Double-decker tram terminating at the Hobart GPO, circa 1940s

The Hobart Bus Mall has historically been a hub for various transportation routes connecting different parts of Hobart and its surrounding areas. Serving as a central transfer point where passengers can switch between lines, the interchange has a long history of public transportation, previously offering horse-drawn carriages, trams, trolley-buses and taxis. Commencing operations on 23 September 1893, the Hobart Electric Tram Company's city interchange was established outside the Hobart General Post Office on Elizabeth Street. A small tramway shelter, named the "pagoda" was erected on Elizabeth Street to provide protection for tramway officers in 1935. Trams ceased operations in Hobart on 21 October 1960. Trolley-buses ran from 29 October 1935 until 22 November 1968. Following the closure of Hobart railway station on 18 July 1978, the Hobart Bus Mall became the city's primary public transportation hub.

On 19 November 1991, an eight bay bus station opened with Elizabeth Street closed between Collins and Macquarie streets to normal traffic.

=== Upgrades ===
In 2015, the Hobart City Council announced a $2 million upgrade to the mall. The upgrades include double the sheltered space, 3-meter-wide pedestrian footpaths, additional seating, improved lighting and bike racks. Commencing in 2017, work on the upgrades was divided into multiple stages as a means to minimise disrupting services and the bus mall reopened in October 2020.

==== 2018 vision ====
The Tasmanian Liberals released a public transport policy document showcasing a new underground bus mall for the 2018 Tasmanian state election. The plan included concept designs of a new revitalised Elizabeth Street interchange featuring a sunken courtyard with a stepped profile, Macquarie Street as an overpass bridge, with rapid transport electric buses, premium bus stops featuring digital signage and amenities. Infrastructure Minister Rene Hidding announced that if the Liberal government was re-elected, they would take over management of Davey and Macquarie streets from the Hobart City Council. With a cost exceeding $100m, Hidding noted the project would take two years to construct. In spite of the reelection of the Liberal Government, the project has seen no advancement.

==== Smoke-free Hobart ====
After the adoption of the ten-year strategic plan by the Hobart City Council, titled Hobart: A community vision for our island capital, specific areas within Hobart's CBD, including the Hobart Bus Mall, were designated as smoke-free zones starting from 15 April 2020.

==== Pedestrian scramble ====
Commencing in July 2023, the City of Hobart, in collaboration with the Department of State Growth, activated two pedestrian scrambles, granting pedestrians the ability to traverse in any direction when the traffic signal is green. The initial phase has been initiated at the intersections of Liverpool and Collins Streets, situated at either end of the Elizabeth Street Mall.

== Services ==
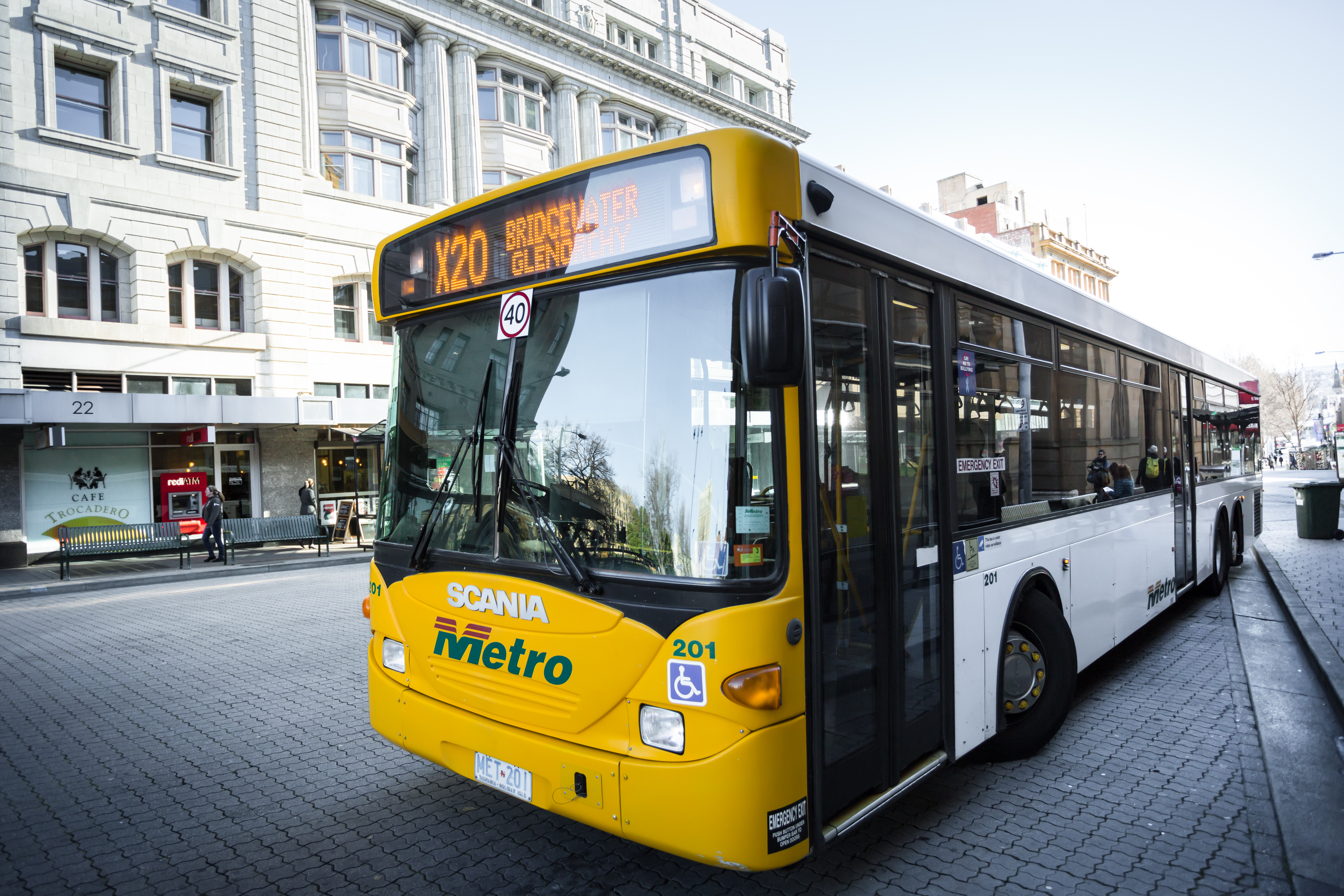
Metro Volgren bodied Scania L94UB departing the Hobart GPO

Along Elizabeth Street, the Hobart Bus Mall has bus stops outside the Hobart GPO (A1, A2), NAB House (A3), Franklin Square (D3) and the Hobart Town Hall (D4). On Macquarie Street, there are stops situated outside the Colonial Mutual Life Building (C1) and Franklin Square (D1, D2). Situated at the northern end of the Elizabeth Street Mall is a single stop (L1) located on Liverpool Street, facilitating services to the suburbs of Mount Stuart and West Hobart.

=== Ticketing ===
A Metro shop located at 40 Elizabeth Street is open from 8 am to 6 pm, Monday to Friday. During daylight savings time in Tasmania, it also operates from 9:30 am to 2 pm on Saturdays. The shop offers free bus schedules and assistance for bus routes, timings, fares, and discounts.

=== Routes ===
Hobart's bus routes are numbered with three digits, according to their geographical area:

- Routes for destinations numbers south of Hobart City Centre are prefixed with 4.
- Routes for destinations numbers north of Hobart City Centre are prefixed with 5.
- Routes for destinations numbers east of Hobart City Centre are prefixed with 6.
- Express route variants are prefixed with X.
- School bus routes on the western side of the River Derwent are prefixed with 2 series, and on the eastern shore they are prefixed with 3. For morning services the third digit is odd, in the afternoon it is even.

Bus Route	Destination	Departing	Stop
500, 501, 502	Glenorchy	Elizabeth St	A1 (Hobart GPO)
503	Tolosa Park	Elizabeth St	A1 (Hobart GPO)
504	Jackson Street	Elizabeth St	A1 (Hobart GPO)
510	Austins Ferry	Elizabeth St	A1 (Hobart GPO)
511	Claremont	Elizabeth St	A1 (Hobart GPO)
512	Cadbury's Estate	Elizabeth St	A1 (Hobart GPO)
513	Chigwell	Elizabeth St	A1 (Hobart GPO)
520	Bridgewater	Elizabeth St	A1 (Hobart GPO)
522	Gagebrook	Elizabeth St	A1 (Hobart GPO)
722	New Norfolk	Elizabeth St	A1 (Hobart GPO)
X10	Granton	Elizabeth St	A2 (Hobart GPO)
X11	Claremont	Elizabeth St	A2 (Hobart GPO)
X20, X30	Bridgewater	Elizabeth St	A2 (Hobart GPO)
X21	Brighton	Elizabeth St	A3 (NAB House)
X22, X23	New Norfolk	Elizabeth St	A3 (NAB House)
601	Shoreline Shopping Centre	Elizabeth St	A3 (NAB House)
615, X15, 616, X16	Tranmere	Elizabeth St	A3 (NAB House)
624, 625	Clarendon Vale	Elizabeth St	A3 (NAB House)
634, X34	Roches Beach	Elizabeth St	A3 (NAB House)
635	Seven Mile Beach	Elizabeth St	A3 (NAB House)
646, X44	Opossum Bay	Elizabeth St	A3 (NAB House)
685	Geilston Bay	Elizabeth St	A3 (NAB House)
695	Risdon Vale	Elizabeth St	A3 (NAB House)
X01, X08	Huntingfield	Macquarie St	D1 (Franklin Square)
X07, 407, 408, 409, 427, 428, 500	Blackmans Bay	Macquarie St	D1 (Franklin Square)
410	Kingston	Macquarie St	D1 (Franklin Square)
411	Howden	Macquarie St	D1 (Franklin Square)
412	Margate	Macquarie St	D1 (Franklin Square)
X13, 413	Snug	Macquarie St	D1 (Franklin Square)
415	Woodbridge	Macquarie St	D1 (Franklin Square)
416	Middleton	Macquarie St	D1 (Franklin Square)
417	Gordon	Macquarie St	D1 (Franklin Square)
426	Taroona	Macquarie St	D1 (Franklin Square)
429	Summerleas Road	Macquarie St	D1 (Franklin Square)
X710, 710	Huonville	Macquarie St	D1 (Franklin Square)
712	Ranelagh	Macquarie St	D1 (Franklin Square)
714	Cygnet	Macquarie St	D1 (Franklin Square)
714	Geeveston	Macquarie St	D1 (Franklin Square)
718, 719	Dover	Macquarie St	D1 (Franklin Square)
446	Marlyn Road	Macquarie St	D2 (Franklin Square)
447	Strickland Avenue	Macquarie St	D2 (Franklin Square)
448, 449	Fern Tree	Macquarie St	D2 (Franklin Square)
401, 402	Lower Sandy Bay	Elizabeth St	D3 (Franklin Square)
X58, 457, 458	Mount Nelson	Elizabeth St	D3 (Franklin Square)
501, 601	University	Elizabeth St	D3 (Franklin Square)
541	Springfield	Elizabeth St	B1 (Mövenpick Hotel)
X42, 552, X50	Glenorchy	Elizabeth St	B1 (Mövenpick Hotel)
551, 552, 553	Lenah Valley	Elizabeth St	B1 (Mövenpick Hotel)
560, 561	Glenorchy	Macquarie St	C1 (Colonial Mutual Life Building)
562	Springfield	Macquarie St	C1 (Colonial Mutual Life Building)
606	Shoreline Shopping Centre	Macquarie St	C1 (Colonial Mutual Life Building)
654, 655	Mornington	Macquarie St	C1 (Colonial Mutual Life Building)
664, X64	Seven Mile Beach	Macquarie St	C1 (Colonial Mutual Life Building)
676	Rosny Park	Macquarie St	C1 (Colonial Mutual Life Building)
725	Richmond	Elizabeth St	D4 (Hobart Town Hall)
726	Campania	Elizabeth St	D4 (Hobart Town Hall)
731, X31, X33	Sorell	Elizabeth St	D4 (Hobart Town Hall)
732, X32	Dodges Ferry	Elizabeth St	D4 (Hobart Town Hall)
734	Nubeena	Elizabeth St	D4 (Hobart Town Hall)
736	Swansea	Elizabeth St	D4 (Hobart Town Hall)
737	Bicheno	Elizabeth St	D4 (Hobart Town Hall)
540	Mount Stuart & West Hobart	Liverpool St	L1 (Elizabeth St Mall)
