= Bathurst Street =

Bathurst Street may refer to:

- Bathurst Street, Hobart
- Bathurst Street, Sydney
- Bathurst Street (Toronto)
