= Franklin Square (Hobart) =

Public square in Hobart, Tasmania

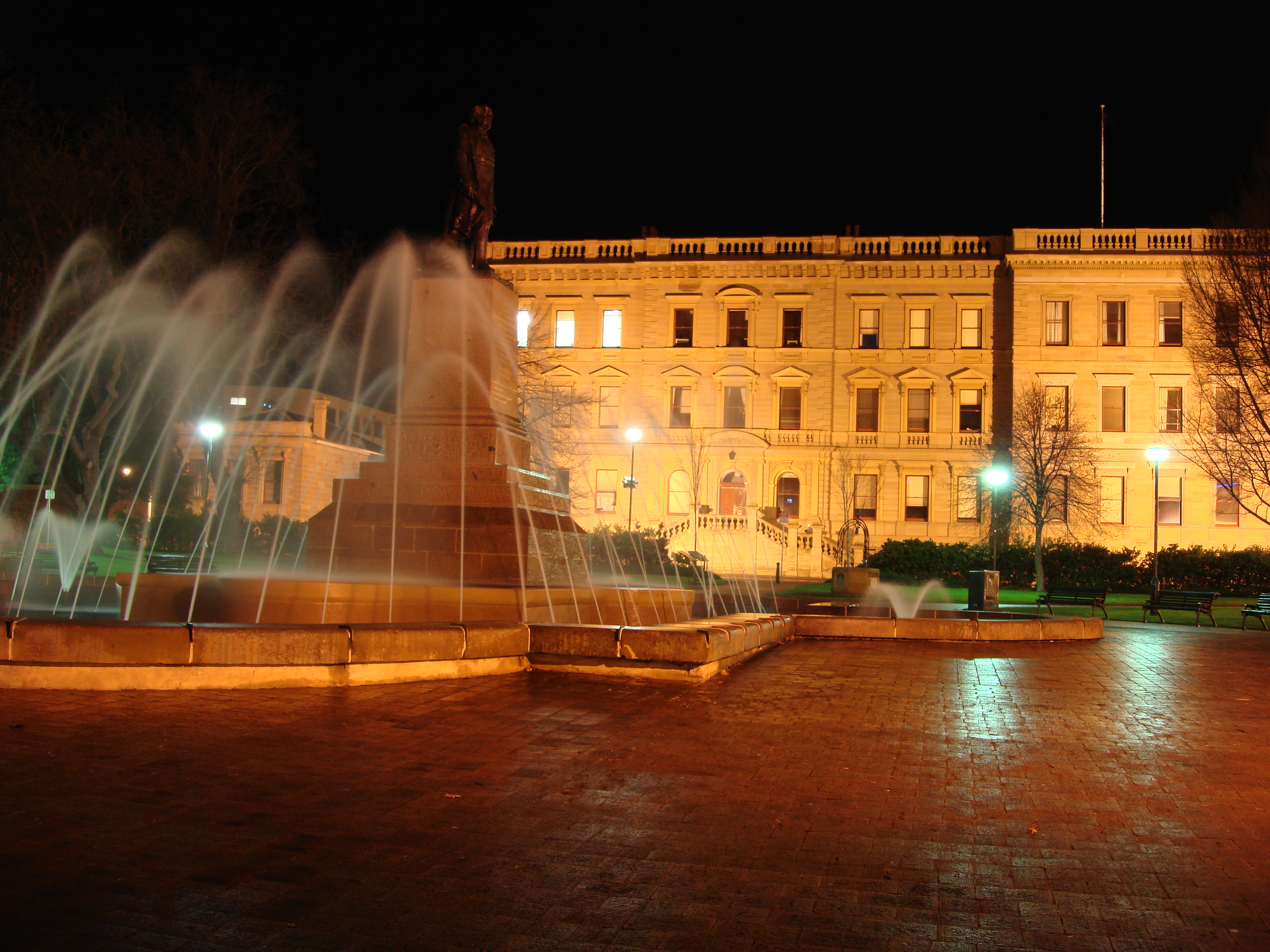
- Franklin Square monument fountain with Franklin Square Offices at night
- Interactive map of Franklin Square
- Type: Public space
- Location: 70 Macquarie Street, Hobart, Tasmania, Australia
- Coordinates: 42.883340°S 147.330248°E
- Area: 1.6 acres (0.63 hectares)
- Created: 1863-1866
- Operator: Hobart City Council
- Open: All year
- Public transit: Hobart Bus Mall

Tasmanian Heritage Register
- Place ID: 2,333
- Status: Permanently Registered

Franklin Square is a 1.6-acre (0.63-hectare) oak-lined public square located in the Hobart central business district in Tasmania, Australia. It is named for the British Royal Navy officer and Arctic explorer Sir John Franklin, who served as the 4th Lieutenant-Governor of Van Diemen's Land. The centrepiece of the park is a statue of Franklin, with an epitaph written by Alfred, Lord Tennyson. As the city's most central urban parkland and transportation hub, Franklin Square is frequently utilised for festive markets, public gatherings and as a place for public protest.

== History ==
Franklin Square and the Treasury buildings were built on the site of the Old Government House, which was demolished in 1858. Originally named George's Square in honour of King George IV, Governor Lachlan Macquarie envisioned the site being utilised for a church, courthouse, town hall, public market, as well as a main guard for stationed troops and a public garrison parade area, as regular musters had previously been held on the grounds of the Old Government House since at least 1817. Eventually it was decided that a public space was required to establish a centre point for the growing colony as a community meeting place. In 1860, a parliamentary resolution was passed dedicating funds for the creation of a statue and fountain as the centrepiece for the new gated central park in honour of Sir John Franklin.

On May 20, 1863, two oak trees were planted in Franklin Square by the second Governor of Tasmania, Thomas Gore Browne, and Harriet Louisa Browne, commemorating the marriage of Edward VII to Alexandra of Denmark. A public procession led by citizens gathered at the square, where the Mayor Alfred Kennerley addressed His Royal Highness in the British tradition. The Governor and Mrs. Browne each planted an oak, with His Excellency noting, "As loyalty is deeply rooted in Tasmania's people, may these trees flourish as a symbol of our enduring allegiance to the Sovereign". To honour the 50th year of the occasion, Tasmanian Premier William Propsting installed a memorial plaque at the trees on November 9, 1903, His Majesty King Edward VII's birthday.

=== Bomb shelter transformation ===
The threat of an Axis power invasion was heightened during the Second World War, first following the German auxiliary cruiser Pinguin laying two minefields in Storm Bay between 31 October and 1 November 1939, and a Japanese reconnaissance flight recorded over Hobart during the same period as the Bombing of Darwin in 1942. Due to its centralised location within the Hobart CBD, Franklin Square was transformed into a bomb shelter until the remainder of the war, offering shelter for 900 people.

=== 2016 upgrades ===
In 2015, Franklin Square was closed for significant upgrades including the hydraulic and electrical systems for the centrepiece fountain, renovations on the Elizabeth Street restrooms, newly established garden beds, retaining walls, improved pathway access and the relocation of the giant chess board. Celery-top pine wood was recovered from Lake Pieman as part of the new Hydrowood project to make the park's new furnishings. Franklin Square officially reopened on 27 May 2016.

== Protests ==
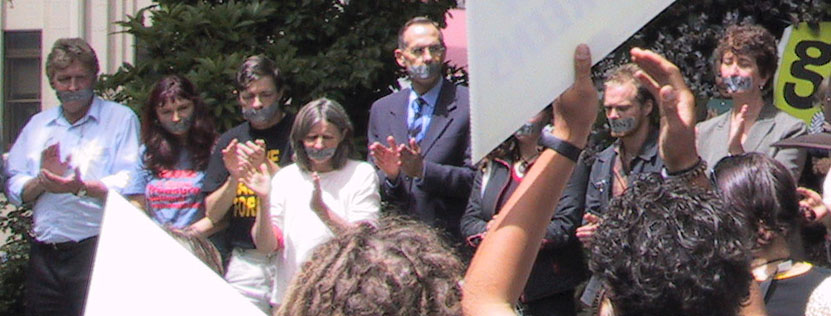
Bob Brown and members of the Gunns 20 group protesting in 2004

Franklin Square has long been utilised as a place for peaceful public protest for causes such as worker's rights, pro-Tibet demonstrations and government regulations surrounding genetically modified crops. Notable historic events include:

- Malcolm Fraser, leader of the Liberal opposition at the time, was the target of a large-scale protest demonstration at Franklin Square in October 1975.
- Repeated large-scale protests occurred at the square following the Franklin Dam controversy between 1981 and 1983.
- Bob Brown and The Greens protested mass logging forestry enterprise Gunns' lawsuit of the Gunns 20 group on 15 December 2004.
- Thousands of people gathered in Franklin Square to protest against Gunns' proposed $1.7b Tamar Valley pulp mill on 17 November 2007.

== Location and layout ==
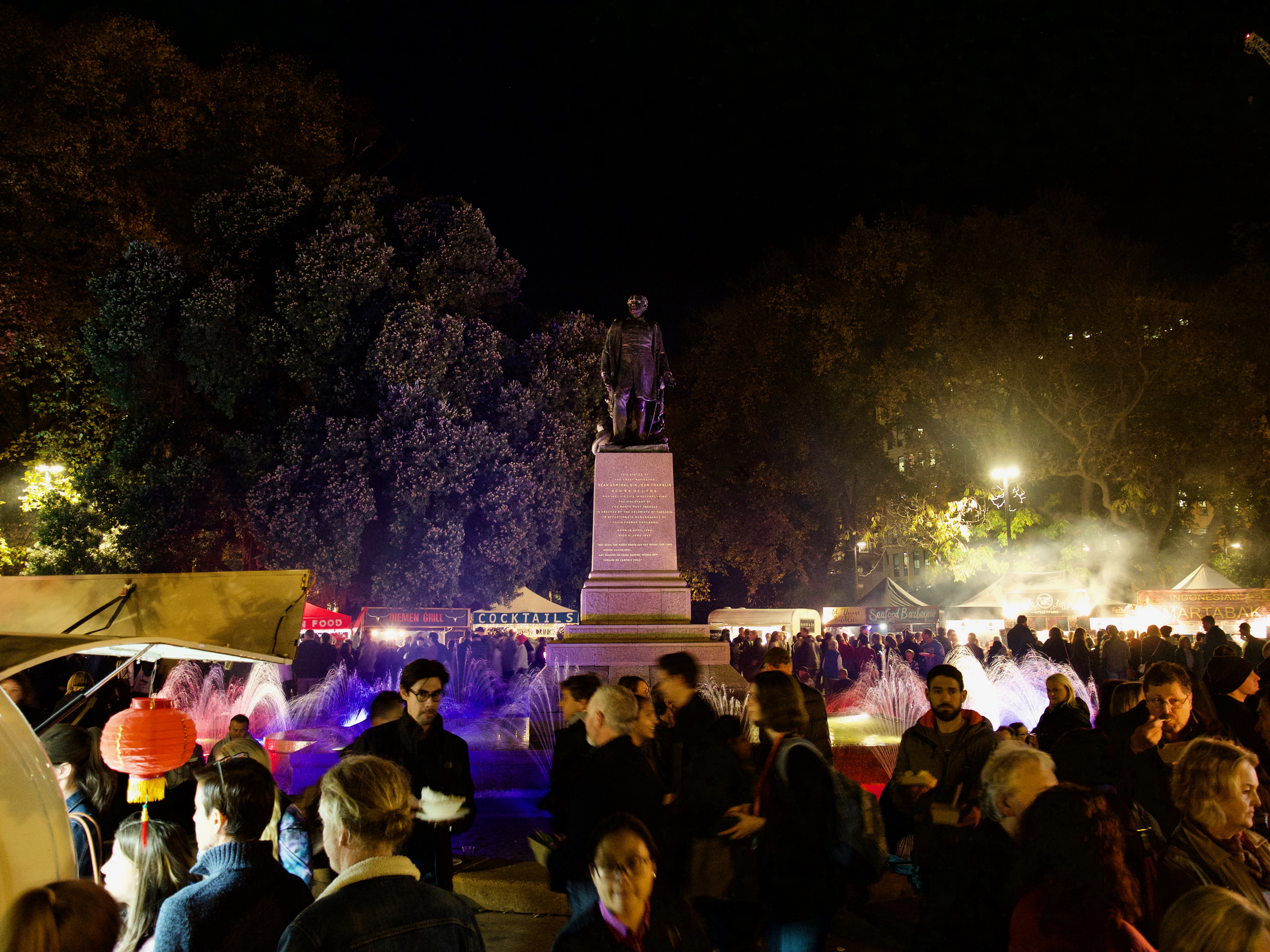
Night market at Franklin Square (April 2018)

Franklin Square measures roughly 75 by 85 metres (246 ft × 279 ft) of open space in a skewed rectangle, occupying roughly a whole urban block bounded by Macquarie, Elizabeth and Davey streets and the Treasury buildings, which face Murray Street. From the eastern Davey-Elizabeth corner, the parkland climbs sharply 8 metres (26 ft) to a relatively flat area next to Macquarie Street with a high bank to lower Elizabeth Street and to Davey Street. The Franklin Square Offices (formerly known as the Public Buildings), a private road or parking space next to them, as well as sidewalks and perimeter bus shelters along Macquarie and Elizabeth Streets, all encircle the square. The parkland is also bordered by a terraced retaining wall along Davey Street. The open public square is directly opposite the Hobart Bus Mall and Hobart GPO building.

=== Ecology ===
Franklin Square's leafy character is greatly distinguished by English elms (Ulmus minor) and Tilias that are over 150 years old. To the east of the centre pavement, there is a single Tree of Heaven (Ailanthus altissima) and a scattering of medium-sized New Zealand evergreen trees.

== Hobart Interchange ==
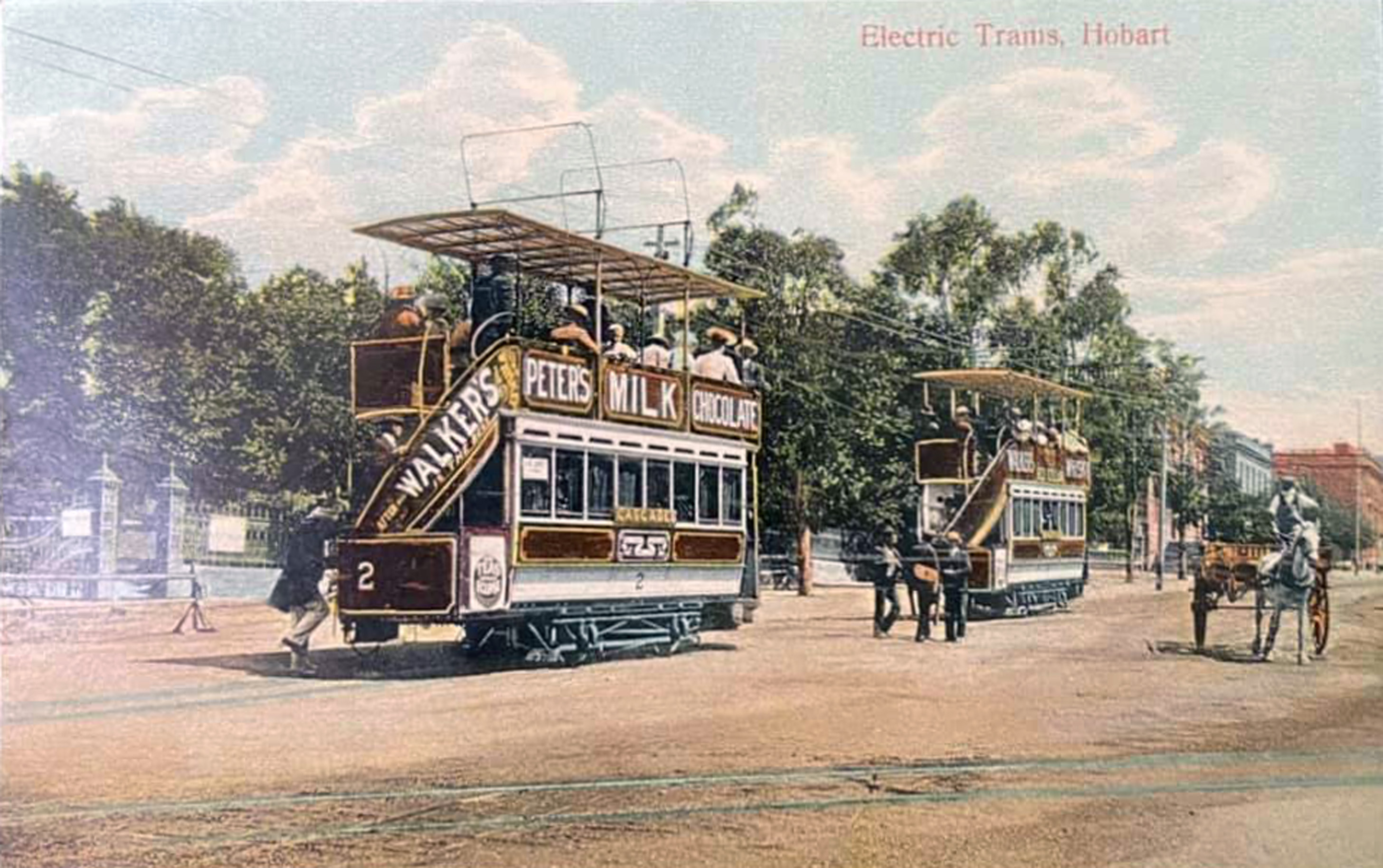
The Hobart tramway network was centred around Franklin Square from 1893 until the system closed in 1960

Metro Tasmania operate southern bus services departing and terminating at Franklin Square via Macquarie Street (Stops D1 and D2), and Elizabeth Street (Stop D3):

Bus Route	Destination	Departing	Stop
X01, X08	Huntingfield	Macquarie Street	D1
X07, 407, 408, 409, 427, 428, 500	Blackmans Bay	Macquarie Street	D1
410	Kingston	Macquarie Street	D1
411	Howden	Macquarie Street	D1
412	Margate	Macquarie Street	D1
X13, 413	Snug	Macquarie Street	D1
415	Woodbridge	Macquarie Street	D1
416	Middleton	Macquarie Street	D1
417	Gordon	Macquarie Street	D1
426	Taroona	Macquarie Street	D1
429	Summerleas Road	Macquarie Street	D1
X710, 710	Huonville	Macquarie Street	D1
712	Ranelagh	Macquarie Street	D1
714	Cygnet	Macquarie Street	D1
714	Geeveston	Macquarie Street	D1
718, 719	Dover	Macquarie Street	D1
446	Marlyn Road	Macquarie Street	D2
447	Strickland Avenue	Macquarie Street	D2
448, 449	Fern Tree	Macquarie Street	D2
401, 402	Lower Sandy Bay	Elizabeth Street	D3
X58, 457, 458	Mount Nelson	Elizabeth Street	D3
501, 601	University	Elizabeth Street	D3

== Features ==
=== King Edward VII monument ===
A bronze statue of King Edward VII stands on a sandstone plinth on the Macquarie Street footpath. Due to the widening of Macquarie Street for the creation of two Hobart Interchange bus stops, the statue is now situated very close to the road.

=== John Franklin monument ===
The centrepiece of Franklin Square is a large monument to John Franklin, encompassing a large bronze statue which stands on a plinth surrounded by a two-tier fountain constructed with sandstone. Erected at a cost of £1,000, the statue is one of the park's original fixtures from 1860. Originally the statue was surrounded by a mound of stone, with water lilies and flowering creepers procured in the fountain waters. A commemoration celebration was held in 1947 for the centenary since Franklin's governance. Governor Sir Hugh Binney gave a speech and placed a laurel wreath onto the statue. Others to speak at the service included Reverend Geoffrey Cranswick, the Lord Mayor Basil Osborne, alderman of the Hobart City Council, naval services and other community representatives. Floodlights were installed in the fountain in 1947.

=== Oversized chess-set ===
Along the Davey Street side of the park, a chequered section of concrete measuring 4 by 4 metres (13 ft × 13 ft) serves as an oversized outdoor chess board. Constructed by the Sandy Bay Lions Club in 1960, the large chess pieces and original park benches that encased the chess pieces were crafted with funds donated by IXL Jam. The chess set is available for play between 8am to 6pm daily. The park benches were replaced following the 2016 upgrades to the square.

=== Two Islands sculpture ===
In 2015, the City of Hobart invested $100,000 into the development, construction and installation of a new interactive artwork entitled Two Islands by sculptor and sound artist Nigel Helyer. Completed in 2017, Helyer was assisted and consulted by Tasmanian Aboriginal canoe-maker Tony Brown to create the sculpture utilising timber, steel, lighting and sound technology.

=== Wishing well ===
Constructed from sandstone with ornate ironwork, the wishing well was opened by Lord Mayor Archibald Park on 30 November 1955 to commemorate 21 years of community service provided by the APEX Club of Hobart. All donations are directed to the Tascare Society for Children.

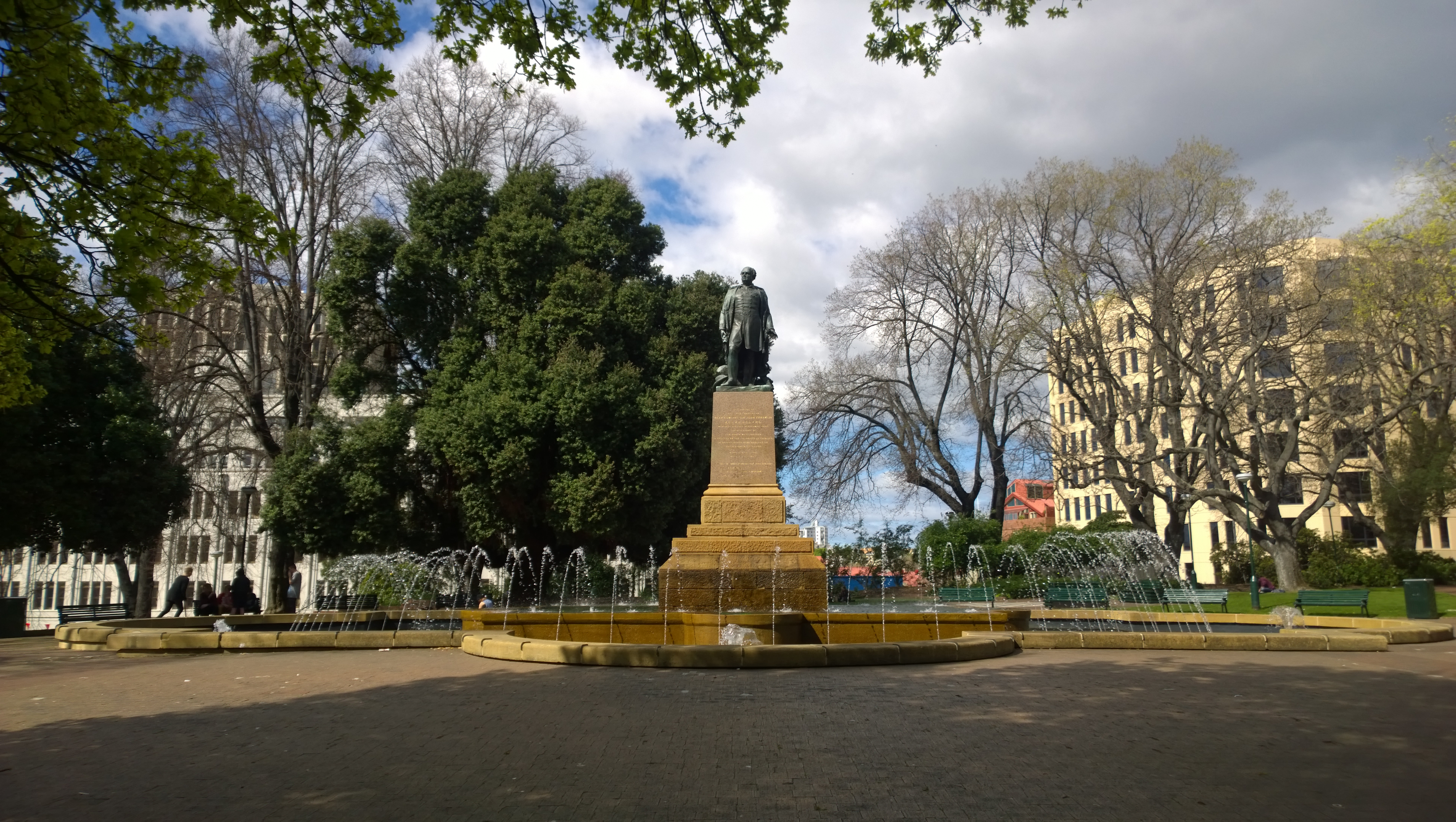
Franklin Square central fountain with tree foliage in 2014

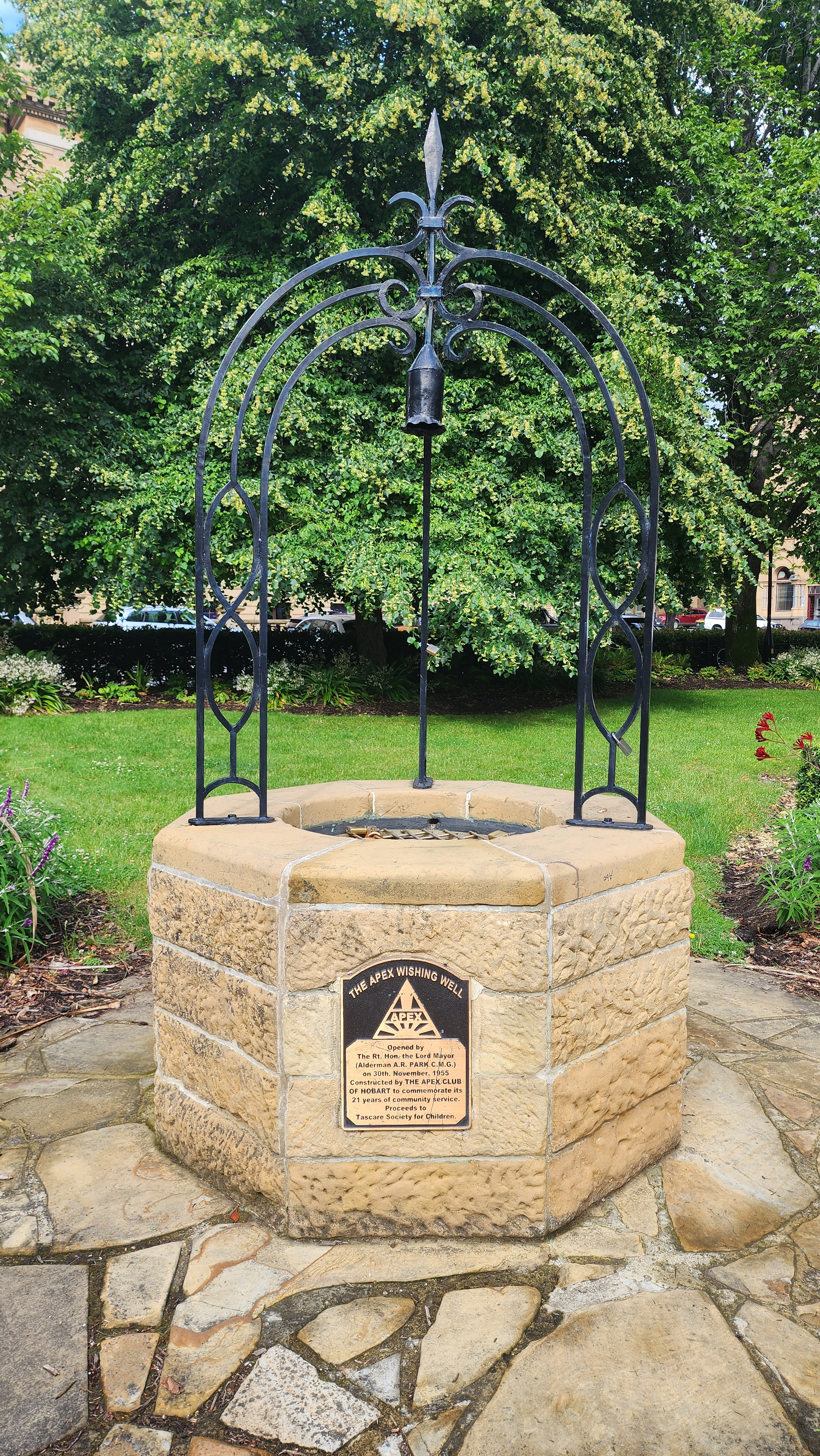
The Apex Wishing Well

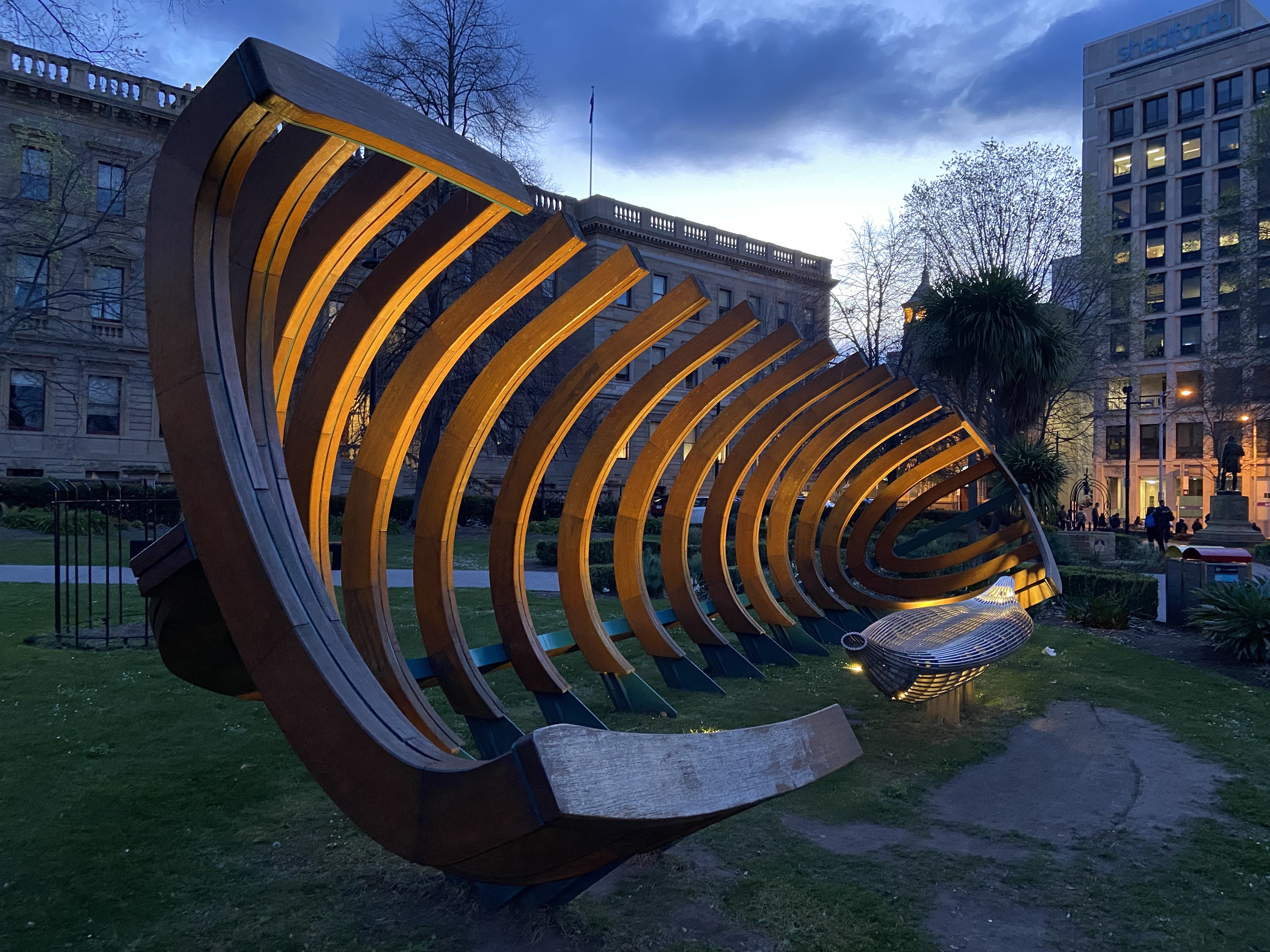
Two Islands sculptor by Nigel Helyer, completed in 2017

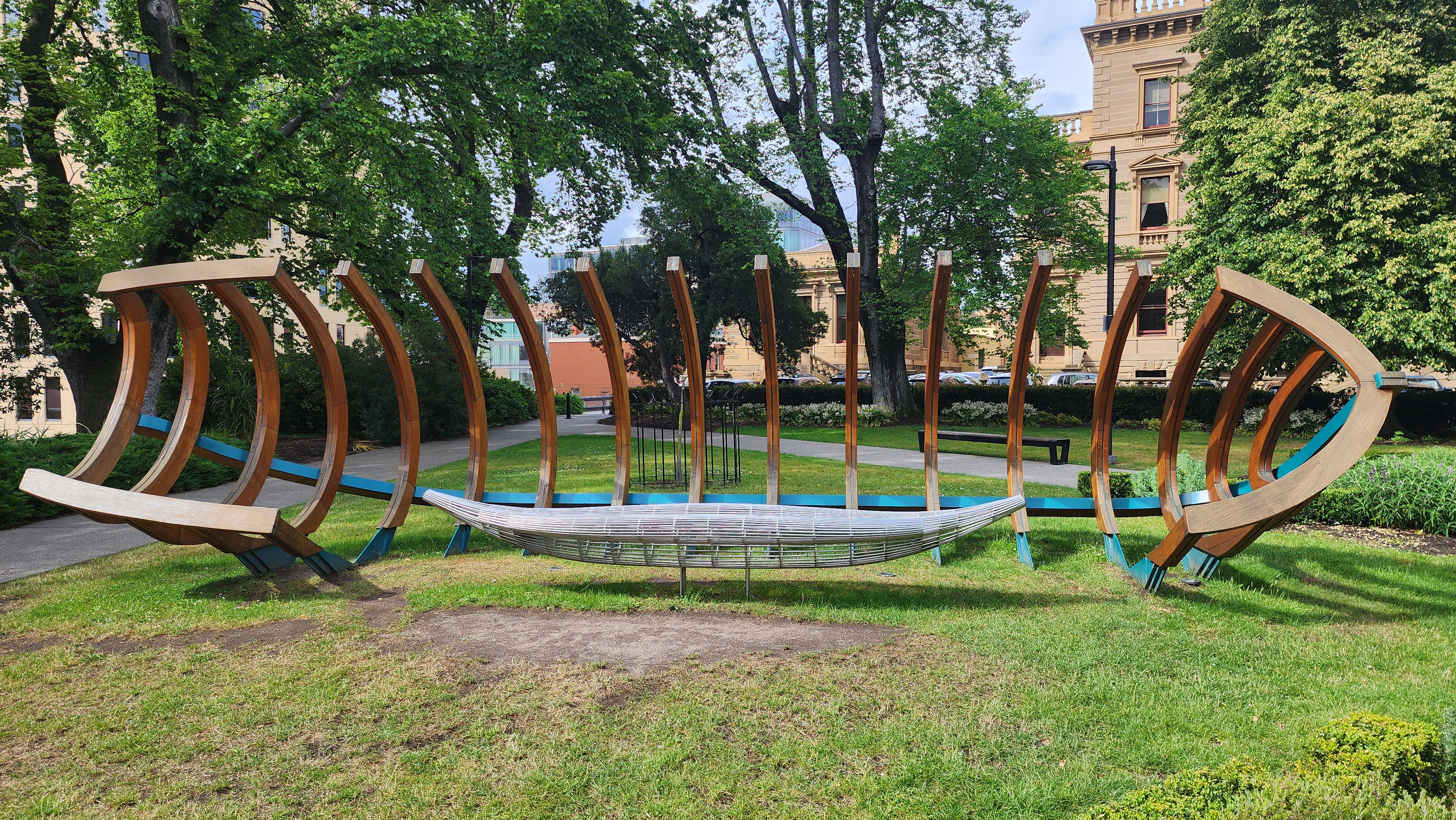
Two Islands sculptor by Nigel Helyer

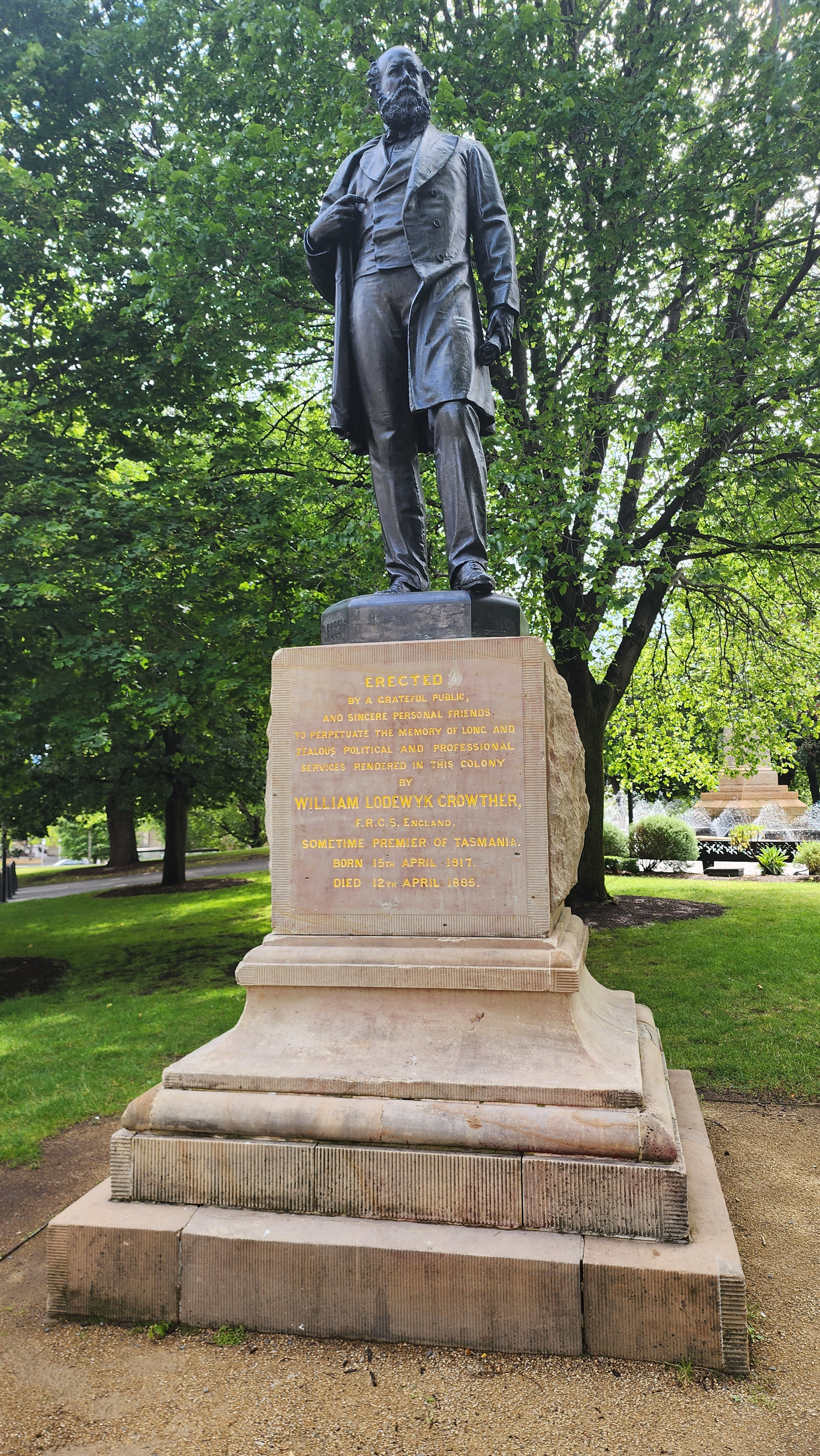
William Lodewyk Crowther statue

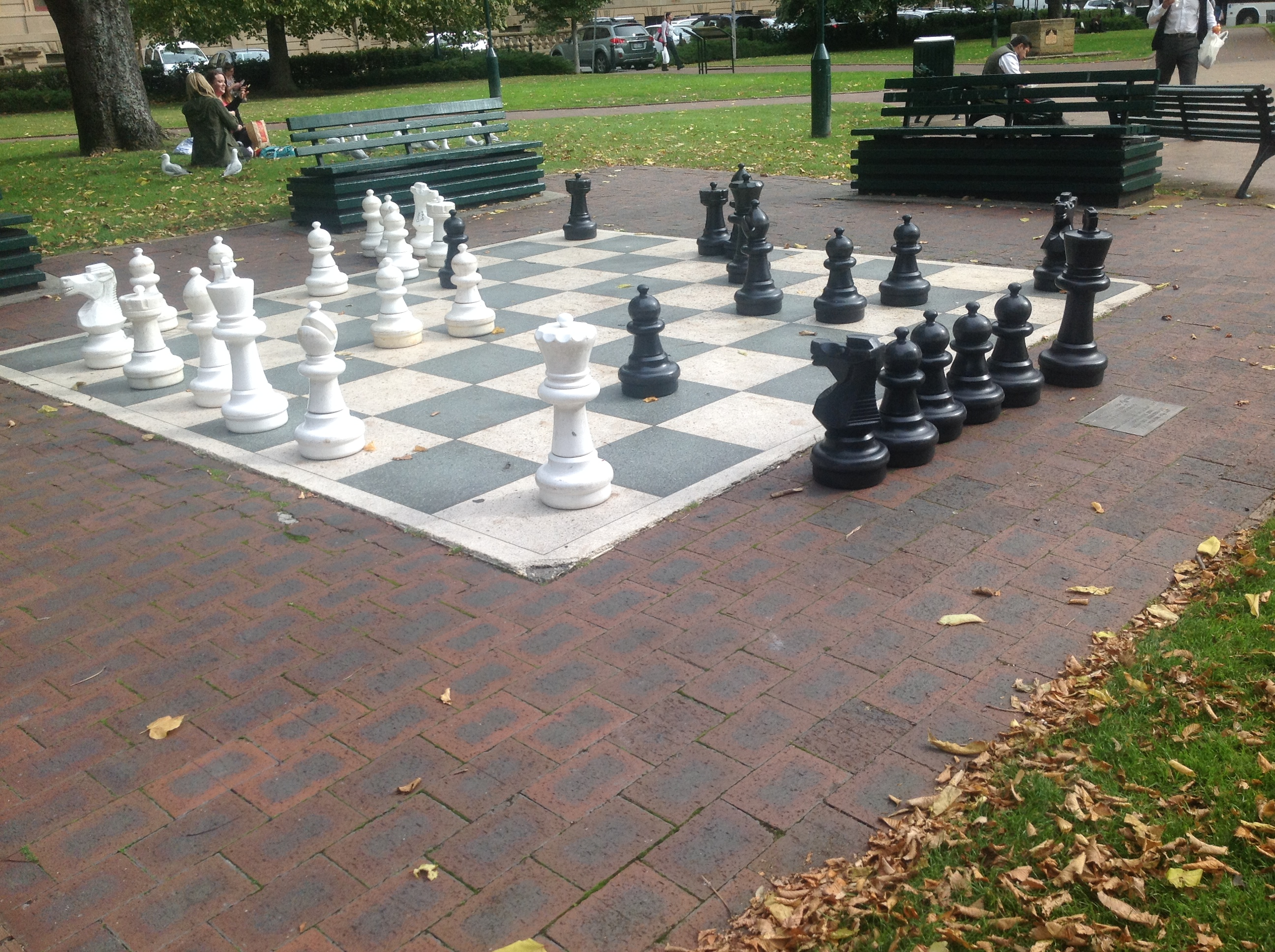
Large chess set

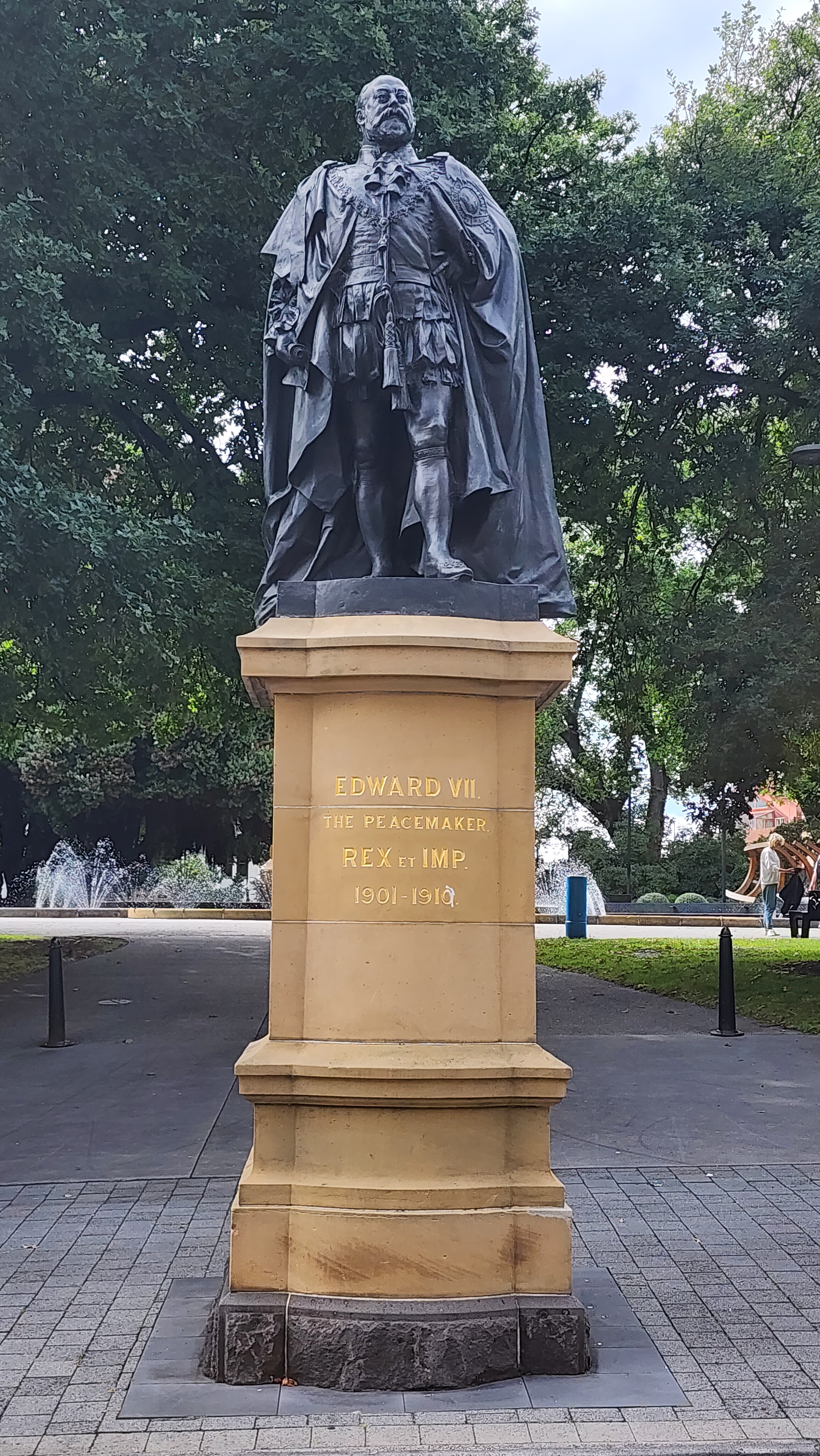
Edward VII statue

== Removed features ==
As the civic square has evolved over the years, many elements, such as statues, seating, pathways, garden beds and other features have been removed.

=== Cannon ===
Originally an 1860s cannon faced Macquarie Street to commemorate the grounds former use for garrison parades. It was removed during the square's transformation into a bomb shelter during the Second World War.

=== William Crowther monument ===
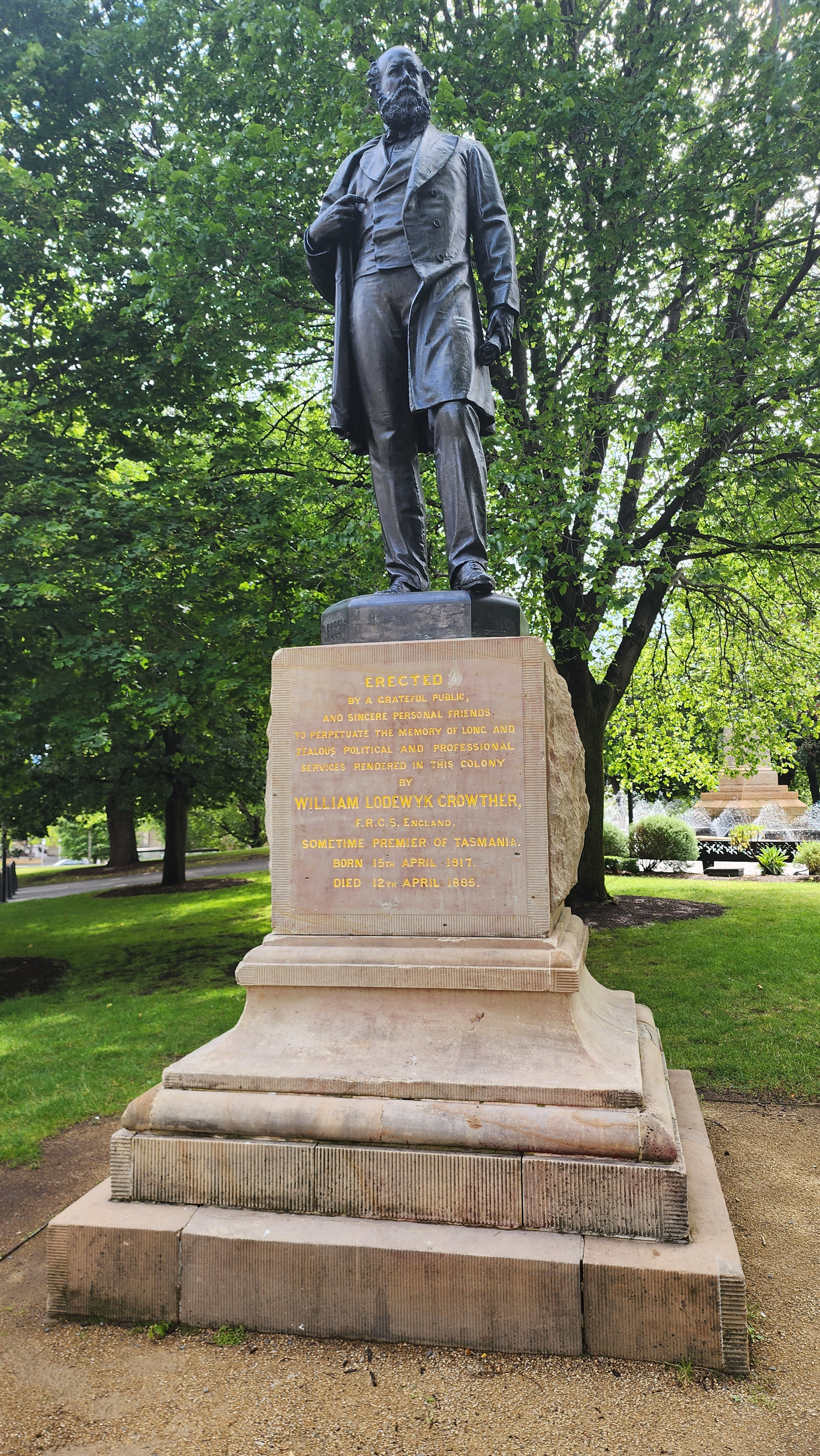
The controversial William Crowther statue in 2024

A large bronze statue standing 2.4 metres (8 ft) depicting Dr William Lodewyk Crowther was erected at the square in 1889, four years after Crowther's passing. In 2020, the Crowther statue became a focal point for conversation surrounding reconciliation in Australia following the removal of statues depicting controversial figures in the wake of the murder of George Floyd. Crowther, a surgeon and former Premier of Tasmania is primarily known for his actions surrounding the theft, decapitation and mutilation of the body of the last full-blooded Tasmanian Aboriginal man, William Lanne in 1869.

==== Crowther Reinterpreted ====
In 2021, the City of Hobart selected four temporary artworks that interacted with the statue to be installed over two month periods called Crowther Reinterpreted. The aim was to evoke conversation surrounding the fate of the statue. The first installation, titled Truth Telling by Tasmanian Aboriginal artist Allan Mansell was unveiled in April 2021. Mansell's piece explored transforming Crowther into Lanne through the painting of statue's face and hands red, placing an Aboriginal flag in his hand, and rewriting the plinth's text, offering an alternative historical narrative. Another artwork, entitled Breathing Space by Northern Tasmanian Aboriginal artist Julie Gough saw the statue covered with a large black crate. Some of Crowther's descendants who learnt of their ancestor's pursuits surrounding biological racism due to the Crowther Reinterpreted project called for the removal of the statue.

==== 2022 council vote ====
On 15 August 2022, the Hobart City Council voted 7 to 4 in favour of removing Crowther's statue from public display. ABC News reported that the council's motion for the statue's removal was believed to be the first of its kind to occur in Australia. The fate of the statue itself remained undecided, with public opinion varying from the statue being destroyed or relocated to the Tasmanian Museum and Art Gallery, where it could be observed within an exhibit offering greater historical context.

==== Statue toppling and removal ====
Legal challenges followed the 2022 council vote, including an appeal to the Tasmanian Civil and Administrative Tribunal (TCAT) by former Hobart councillor Jeff Briscoe and two others. The appeal argued against the statue's removal on various grounds, including its historical and cultural significance to the square. Despite these efforts, TCAT upheld the decision to remove the statue, citing its positive impact on truth-telling and reconciliation. However, just before the ruling on 15 May 2024, the statue was toppled, with its legs cut at the ankles and graffiti advocating for decolonisation sprayed on its plinth.

=== Palisade fence ===
Originally the square was contained by an ornate palisade iron fence. Although discussion surrounding the fate of the fence had begun following the removal of its gates in the 1930s, the topic caused a political stir when the Tasmanian Government offered to take over the square entirely during its transformation into an air raid shelter during the Second World War. Following the removal of the gates, the fence no longer protected the square at night from "undesirable" behaviours. The right of jurisdiction between the state government and city council escalated, with the fence eventually removed to improve park access in 1944. The council suggested the fence could be relocated to the Royal Tasmanian Botanical Gardens, however this never eventuated.

== In popular culture ==
- Franklin Square and the Hobart GPO can be seen in the 1951 feature film Wherever She Goes directed by Michael Gordon about the early life story of Zeehan-born pianist Eileen Joyce.
- Franklin Square's fountain and oversized chess set make a cameo in the 1981 feature film Save the Lady based on the book by Yoram Gross and directed by Leon Thau.
- Historical footage of large-scale public protests held at Franklin Square in 1983 surrounding the Franklin Dam controversy feature in the 2022 feature documentary film, Franklin.

== See also ==
Old Government House, Hobart

== Sources ==
- Gulson, Lesley (2013), Franklin Square conservation plan, Hobart City Council
