= Sustainable Living Tasmania =

Environmental non-profit

Sustainable Living Tasmania is a non-profit community group based in Hobart, Tasmania focused on environmental sustainability, especially regarding climate crisis. It was originally established as the Tasmanian Environment Centre in December 1972 at 281 Elizabeth Street North Hobart, in response to the flooding of Lake Pedder, and moved to 102 Bathurst Street in January 1975. The centre hosted bushwalking and other environmental group events and resources and produced publications about the local environment of Hobart, including educational curricula material. The centre was the venue for foundation of the Tasmanian Wilderness Society in August 1976.

In the late 1990s there was a shift in focus to urban sustainability issues and a name change to "Sustainable Living Tasmania". Since then, it has run community programs such at their Sustainable Living Festivals, helped reduce energy costs for over 5,000 local residents, provided sustainability advice, and supplemented their income with commercial consulting. In 2019, the organisation gave up their physical office space for financial reasons.

In 2024, it won the EPA Sustainability Award (Community) for their Energised Learning project, which provided hands-on teaching about renewable energy to secondary school STEM classes.
