= Hobart Town Hall =

Seat of the City of Hobart government

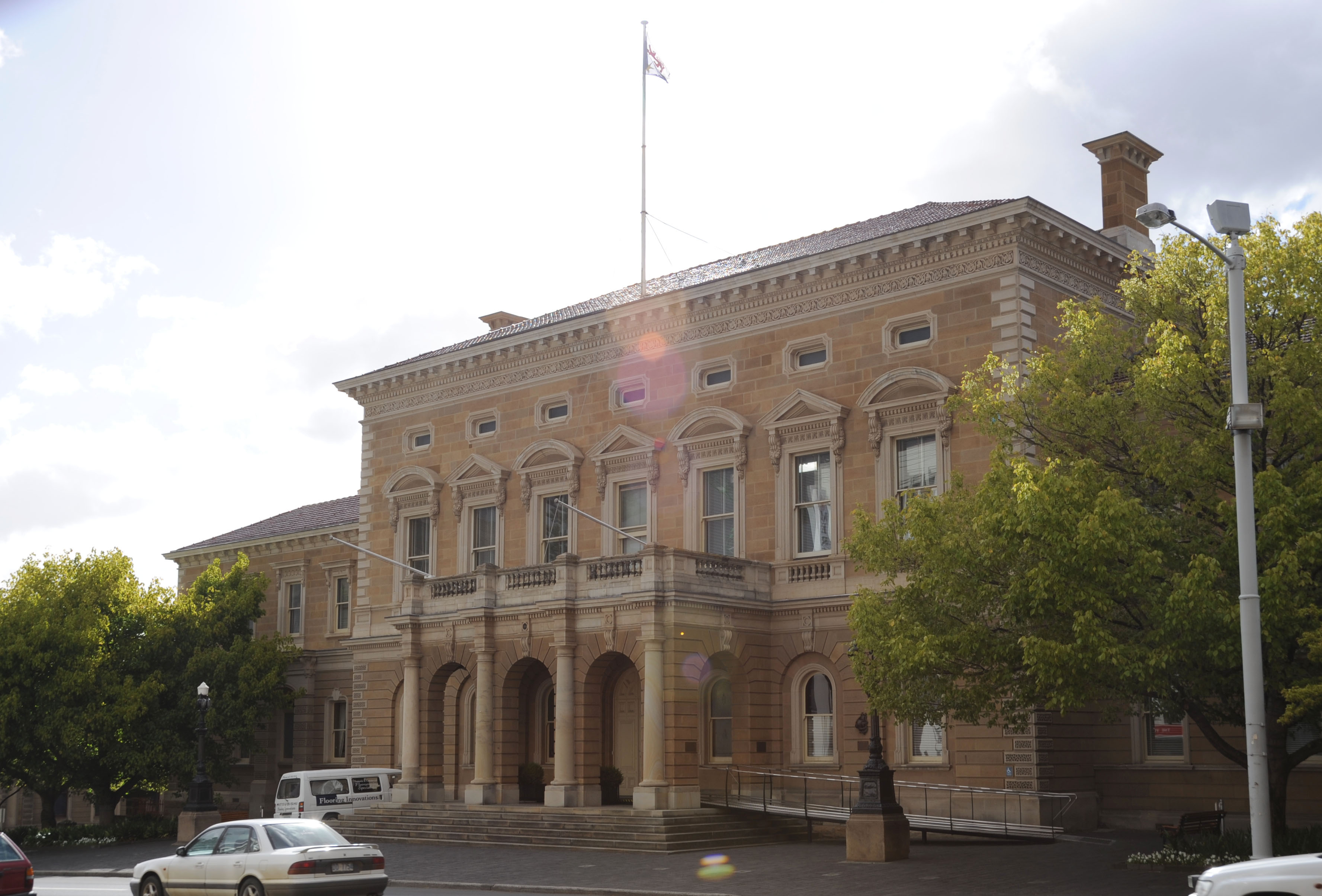
- Front facade.
- Interactive map of the Hobart Town Hall area

General information
- Architectural style: Neo-Renaissance
- Location: Hobart, Tasmania, Australia
- Coordinates: 42.8825°S 147.3309°E
- Construction started: 1864
- Completed: 1866
- Owner: Hobart City Council

Design and construction
- Architect: Henry Hunter

Hobart Town Hall is a landmark sandstone building which serves as seat of the City of Hobart local government area, hosting council meetings as well as acting as public auditorium that can be hired from the council. It is also open to periodic public tours, featuring its ornate Victorian auditorium and the Town Hall organ which has been in use since 1870.

== History ==
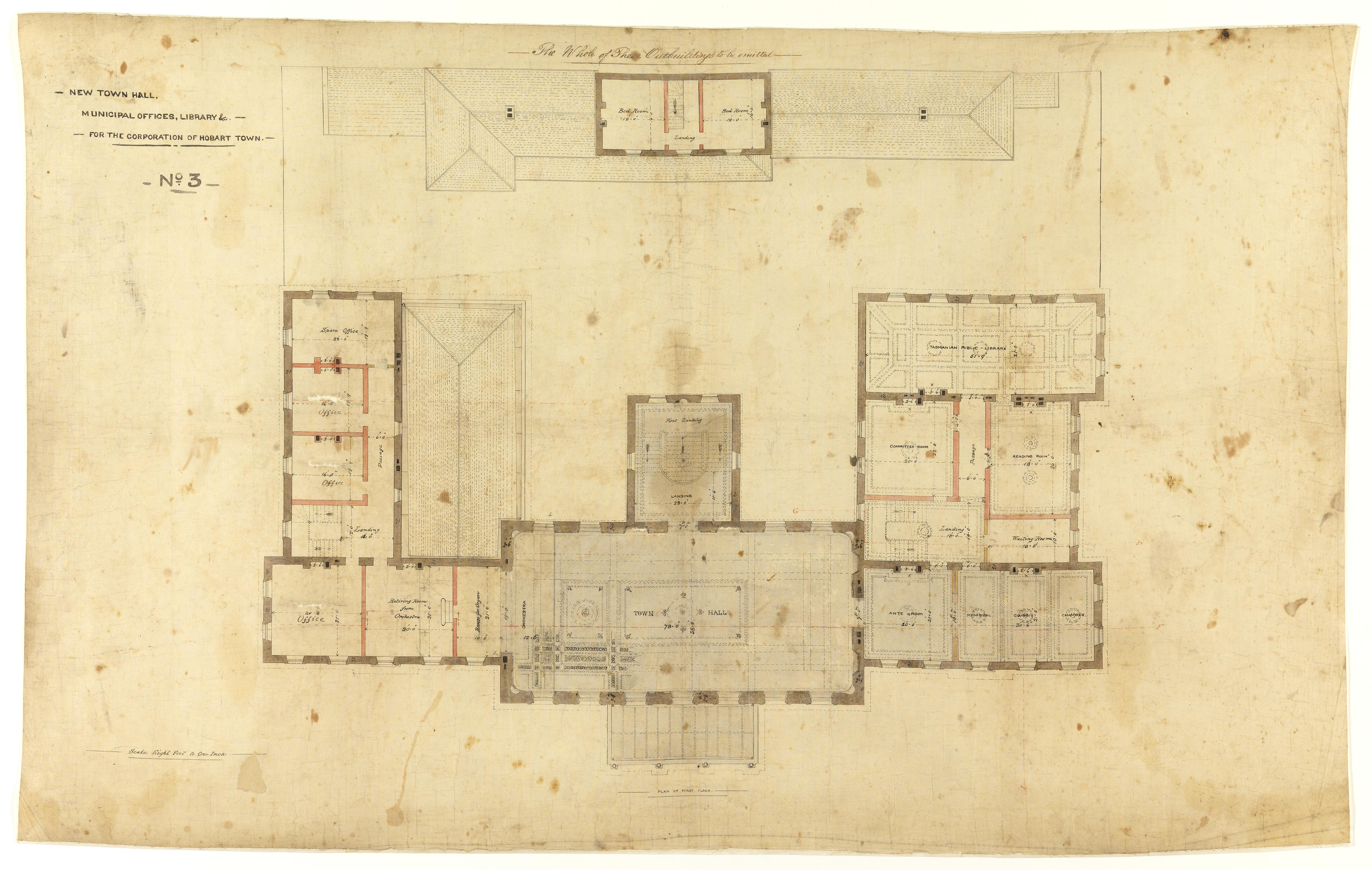
Henry Hunter's plans for Hobart Town Hall

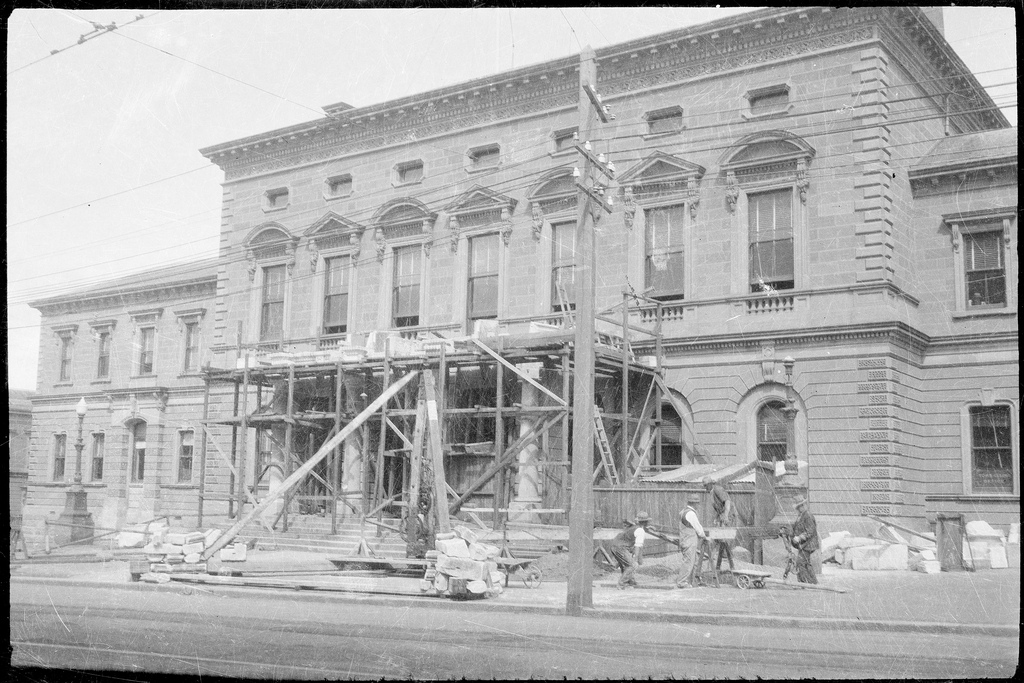
Hobart Town Hall undergoing repairs to its portico in 1925

Construction of the town hall was begun in 1864, with the foundation stone laid on April 14, which was declared a public holiday and celebrated by a parade. It was completed two years later in September 1866, which was celebrated by another public holiday and a gala ball. The design by Henry Hunter was somewhat inspired by the Palazzo Farnese in Rome. At the time of construction, it was designed to house the City of Hobart's council chambers, as well as police offices, the municipal court and the State Library of Tasmania. These remained in use for nearly fifty years after the town hall was opened. It, along with Franklin Square, were built on the site of the former government house which had been demolished upon completion of the present government house.

The City of Hobart organ, built by J. W. Walker of London, and reckoned to be the second finest in Australia, was opened on 17 March 1870 in a concert by F. A. Packer, Albert Alexander RAM, and John Packer.

By 1925 the state of the hall's prominent portico had degenerated to the point where it was declared unsafe and major restoration work had to be undertaken.

The building's well-known chandeliers were installed in the Town Hall's ballroom by former Lord Mayor Doone Kennedy.
