= Old Government House, Hobart =

Historic house in Tasmania, Australia

Coordinates: 42.883°S 147.331°E

Old Government House
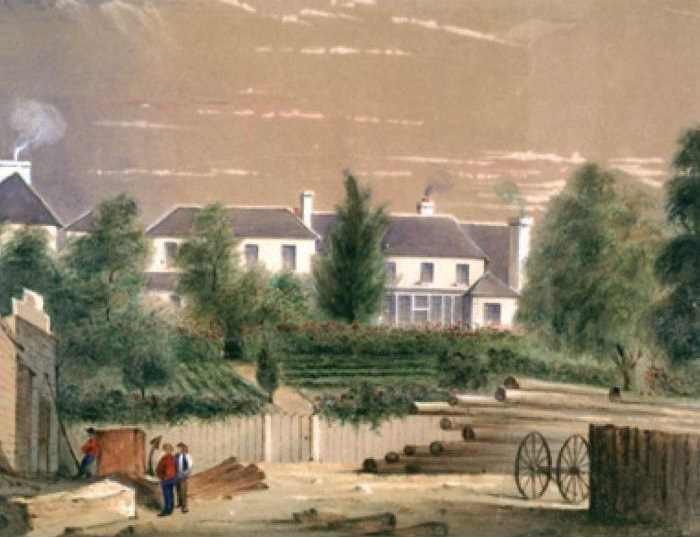
- Watercolour by Samuel Prout Hill, c. 1850
- Interactive map of the Old Government House area

General information
- Status: Demolished
- Type: Public
- Architectural style: Mixed
- Location: Hobart, Australia
- Construction started: 1805–1810
- Demolished: 1858
- Owner: Colony of Van Diemenn's Land

Technical details
- Material: Mixed

Old Government House was the former official residence and home of the Governor of Tasmania from 1807 to 1858, when it was demolished following completion of the modern Government House, Hobart on the Queens Domain. It was located approximately where Hobart Town Hall and Franklin Square stand now. It was built sometime between 1805 and 1810 with dates varying according to sources and at least during 1831 housed the Tasmanian Parliament as well as being the residence of the Governor and meeting place of the Tasmanian Society, a precursor to the Royal Society of Tasmania. The Tasmanian Parliament moved to the modern Parliament House, Hobart in 1841, and following the construction of the modern Government House the old house was demolished. It had earlier been reserved for the location of the new Town hall and a Franklin monument, which were both later built there and continue to stand to this day.
