= Elizabeth Street, Hobart =

Street in Hobart, Tasmania, Australia

Coordinates: 42°52′55.22″S 147°19′43.97″E

Elizabeth Street Tasmania
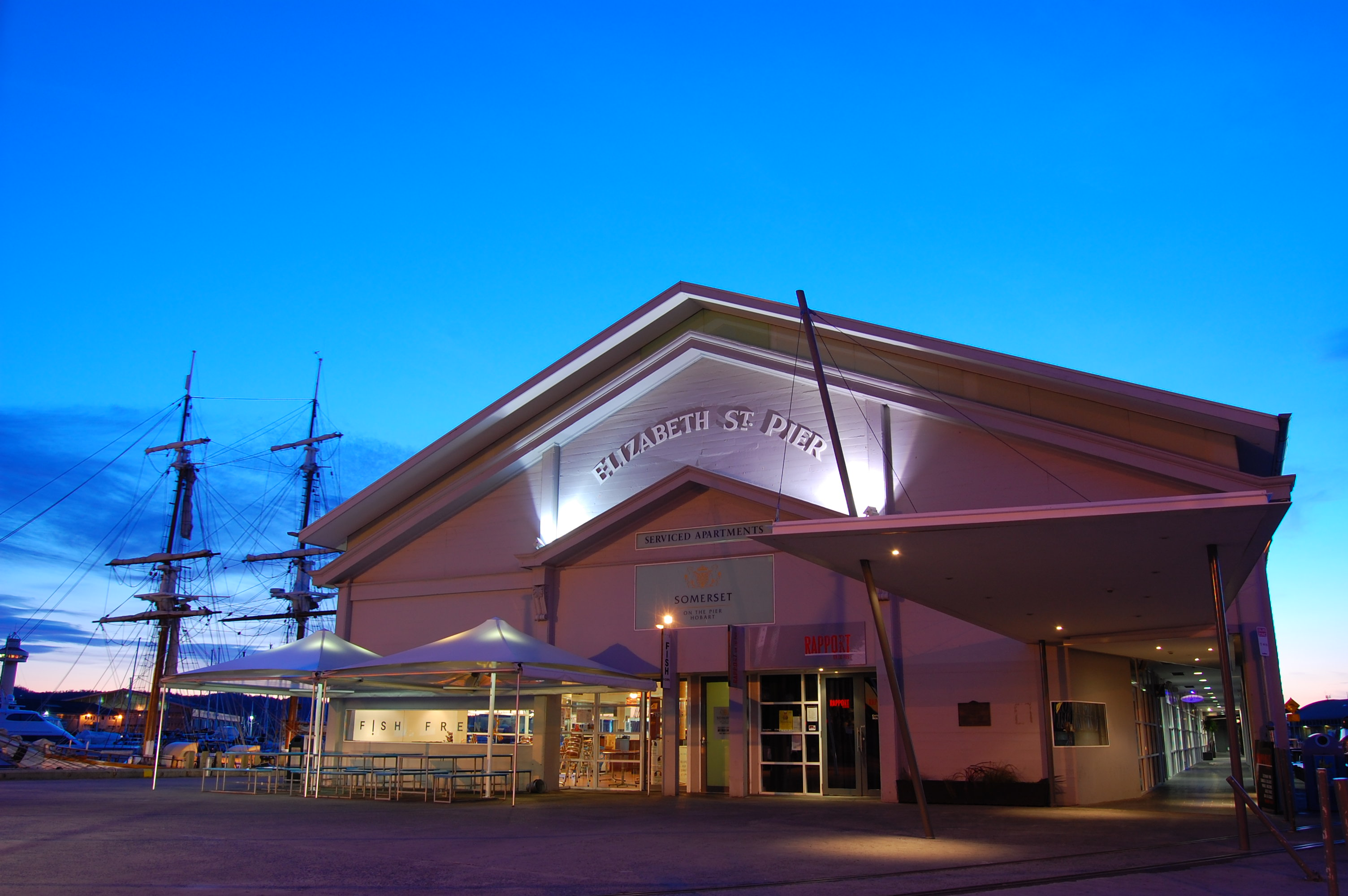
- Elizabeth Street Pier

General information
- Type: Road
- Length: 3 km (1.9 mi)

Major junctions
- Southeast end: Hobart, Tasmania
- Northwest end: New Town, Tasmania

Location(s)
- Major suburbs: North Hobart, New Town

Elizabeth Street is the major street which runs southeast to northwest through the city and suburbs of Hobart, Tasmania, Australia.

It was named by the Governor of New South Wales, Lachlan Macquarie, after his wife Elizabeth Macquarie. It starts at Sullivans Cove and runs northwesterly through the Hobart central business district and the North Hobart shopping district including the State Cinema, and changes to become New Town Road at the intersection with Augusta Road in New Town.

The Elizabeth Street Pier extends into Sullivans Cove from Franklin Wharf near the intersection with Elizabeth Street.

Along the street are significant historical buildings:

General Post Office

Commonwealth Bank

More recent developments include:

Hobart Bus Mall

Elizabeth Street Mall

Elizabeth College.

Many major banks, insurance companies and retail outlets are situated on or close to Elizabeth Street.

== Intersections ==
Elizabeth Street intersects with the following major streets (from south-east to north-west):

- Davey Street
- Macquarie Street
- Collins Street
- Liverpool Street
- Bathurst Street
- Melville Street
- Brisbane Street
- Warwick Street
- Burnett Street
- Elphinstone Road / Federal Street
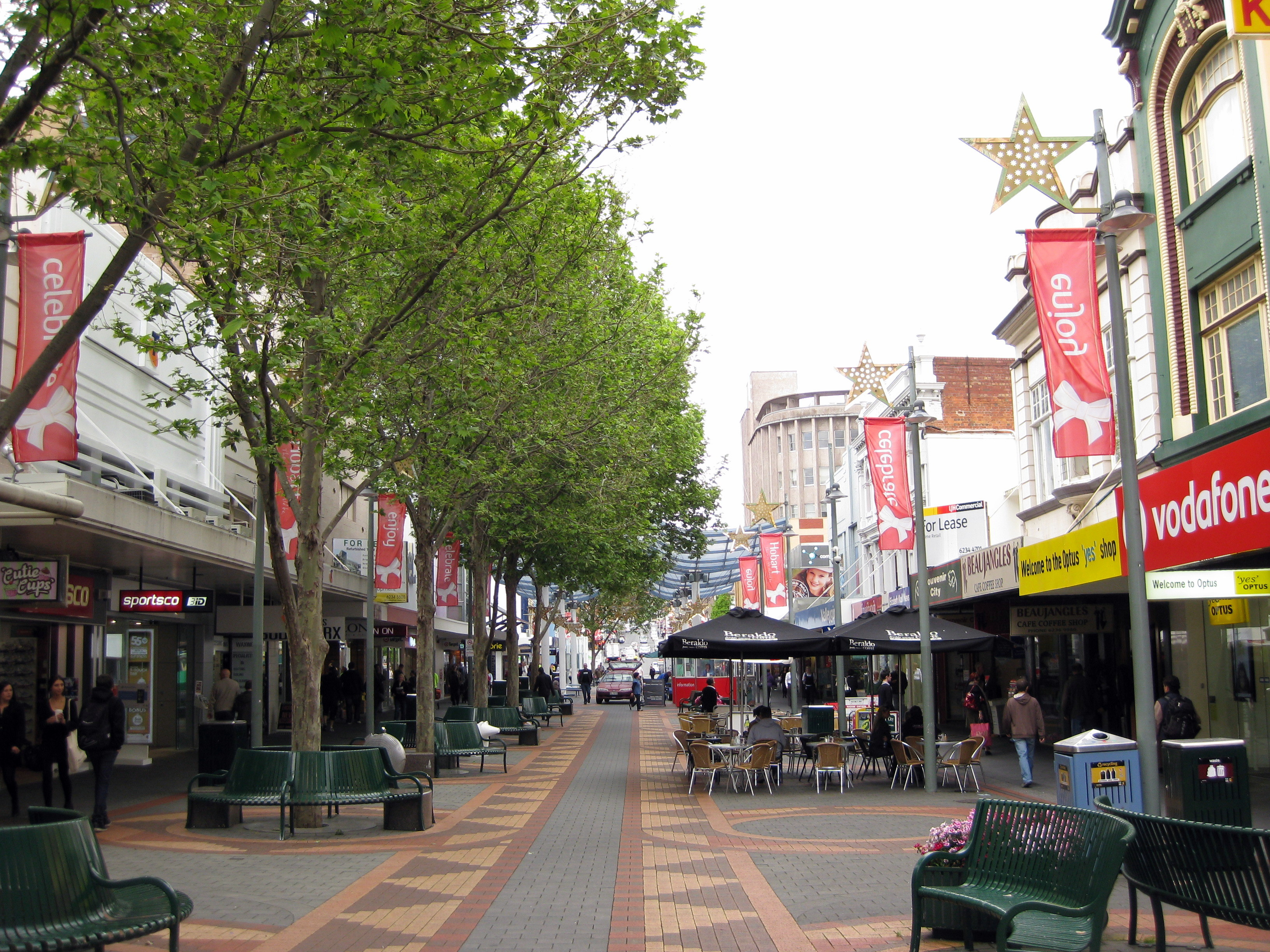
Elizabeth Street Mall

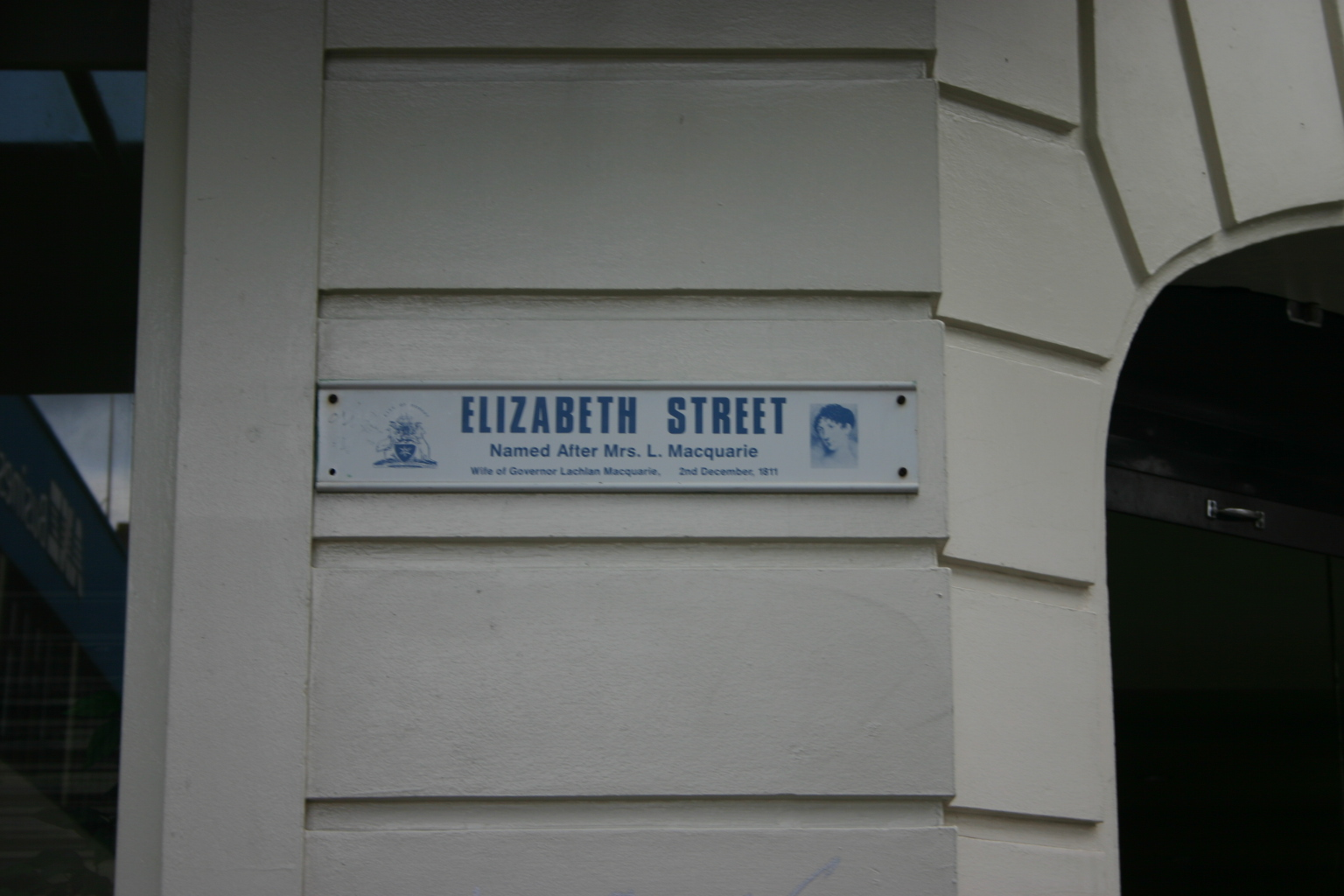
Street sign in Mall
