= Tasmanian Civil and Administrative Tribunal =

- Established: 4 November 2021
- Jurisdiction: Tasmania
- Website: tascat.tas.gov.au

The Tasmanian Civil and Administrative Tribunal (TASCAT) is a quasi-judicial statutory agency tribunal established in 2021.
