= Government House, Hobart =

Official residence of the governor of Tasmania

Government House
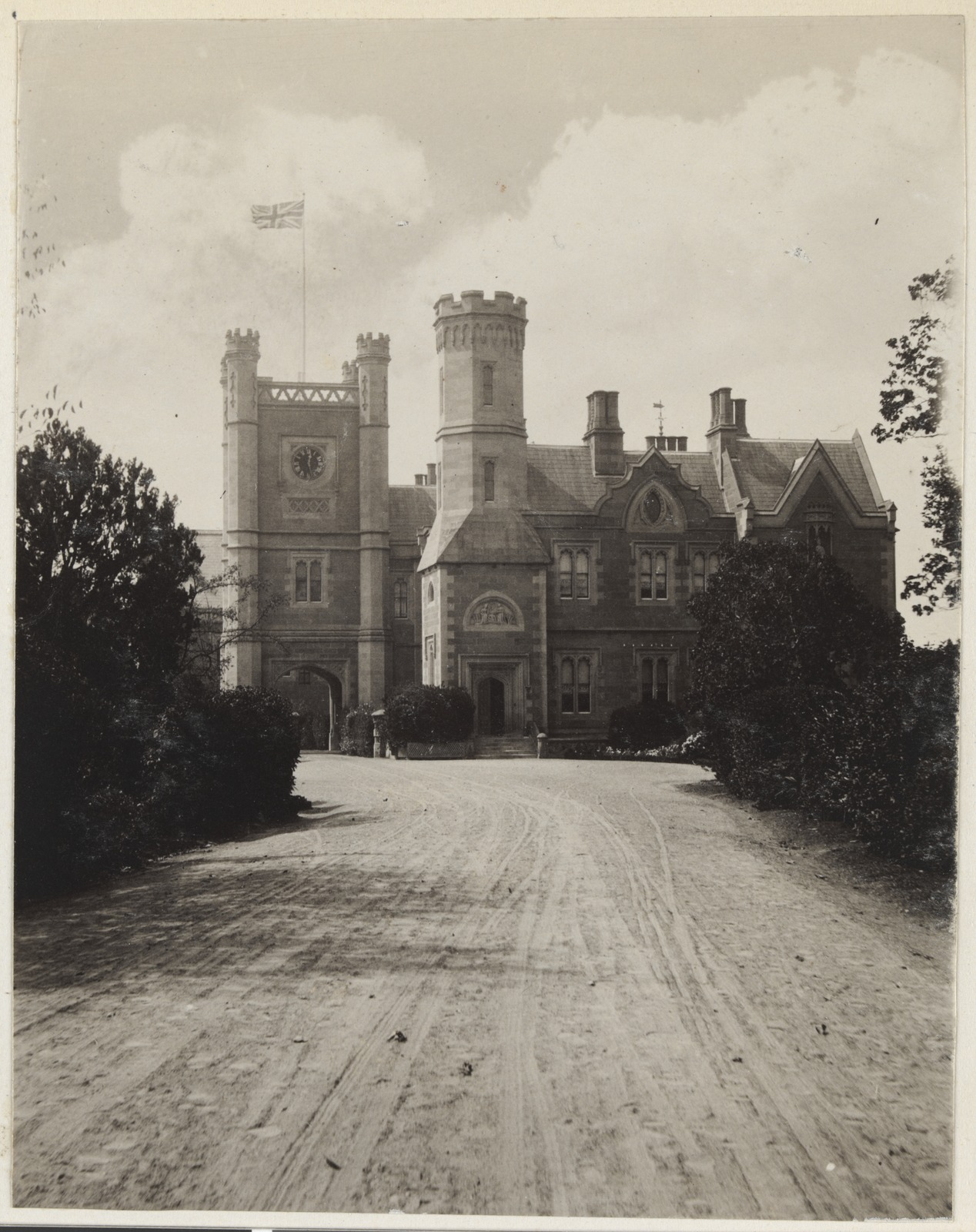
- Drive leading up to Government House (c. 1910)
- Interactive map of the Government House area

General information
- Architectural style: Gothic Revival
- Location: Hobart, Tasmania, Australia
- Coordinates: 42.867567°S 147.333415°E
- Construction started: 1855
- Client: Governor of Tasmania

Technical details
- Size: 73 rooms on 15 hectares

Design and construction
- Architect: William Pordon Kay

Tasmanian Heritage Register
- Place ID: 2,927
- Status: Permanently Registered

Government House, Hobart, is the official residence of the governor of Tasmania. The palatial house is located on Lower Domain Road in the Queens Domain, near the Royal Tasmanian Botanical Gardens. To date, there have been three Government Houses, all in Hobart.

== Earlier residences ==
In 1805, after two years in a tent at Sullivans Cove, Governor Collins moved into the first Government House – a new wooden hut in Barrack Square. As local bricks gradually became available the hut was extended, but it was a primitive three-room home that let in the wind and rain.

The second Government House was built in 1817 at the junction of Macquarie Street and what is now Elizabeth Street. It had 14 rooms on two storeys and had servants' quarters, a coach house and stables, but it was badly built – of brick, wood and stucco, with later extension of sandstone – and was demolished in 1858.

== Architecture ==
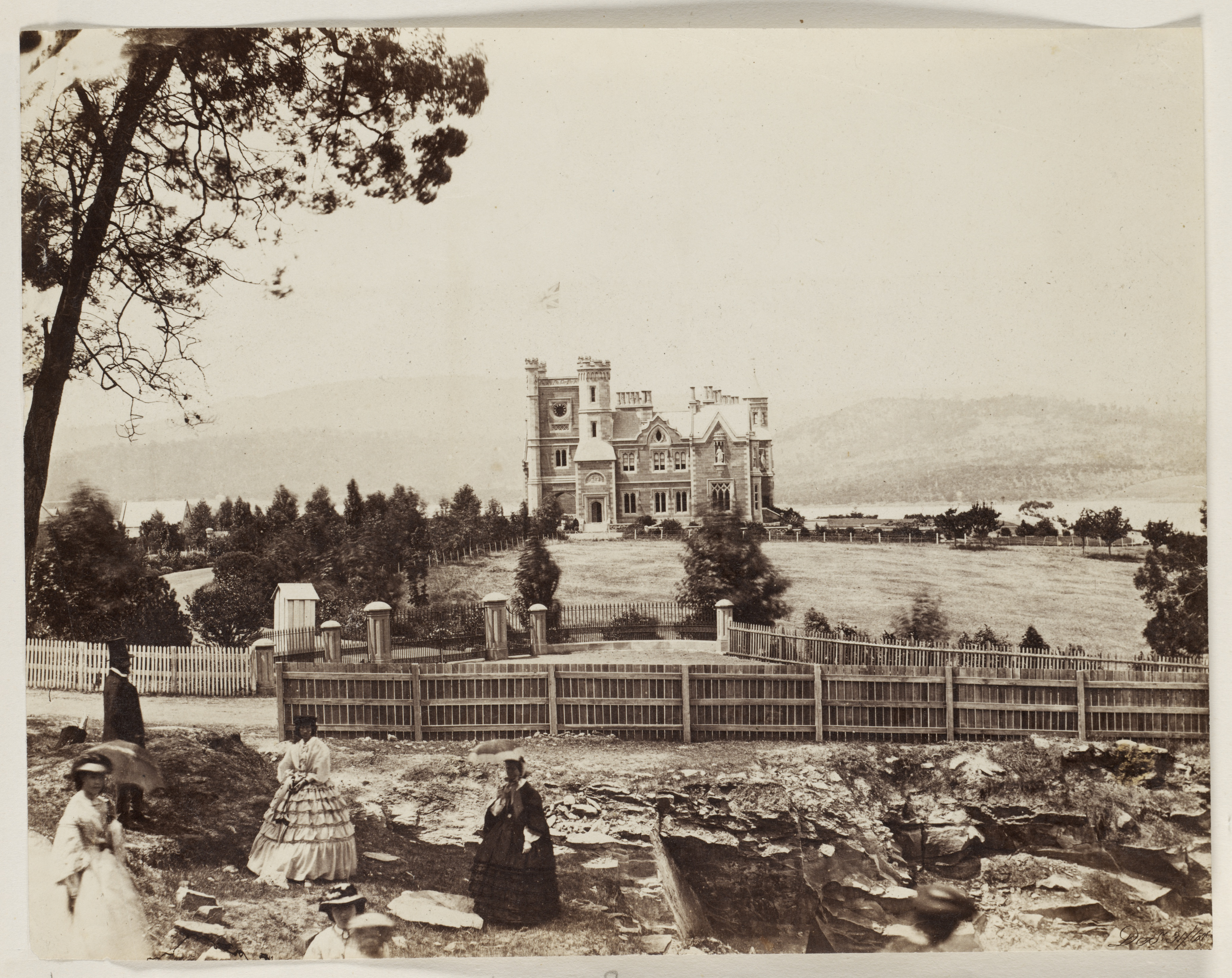
Government House, Hobart, Tasmania, 1861

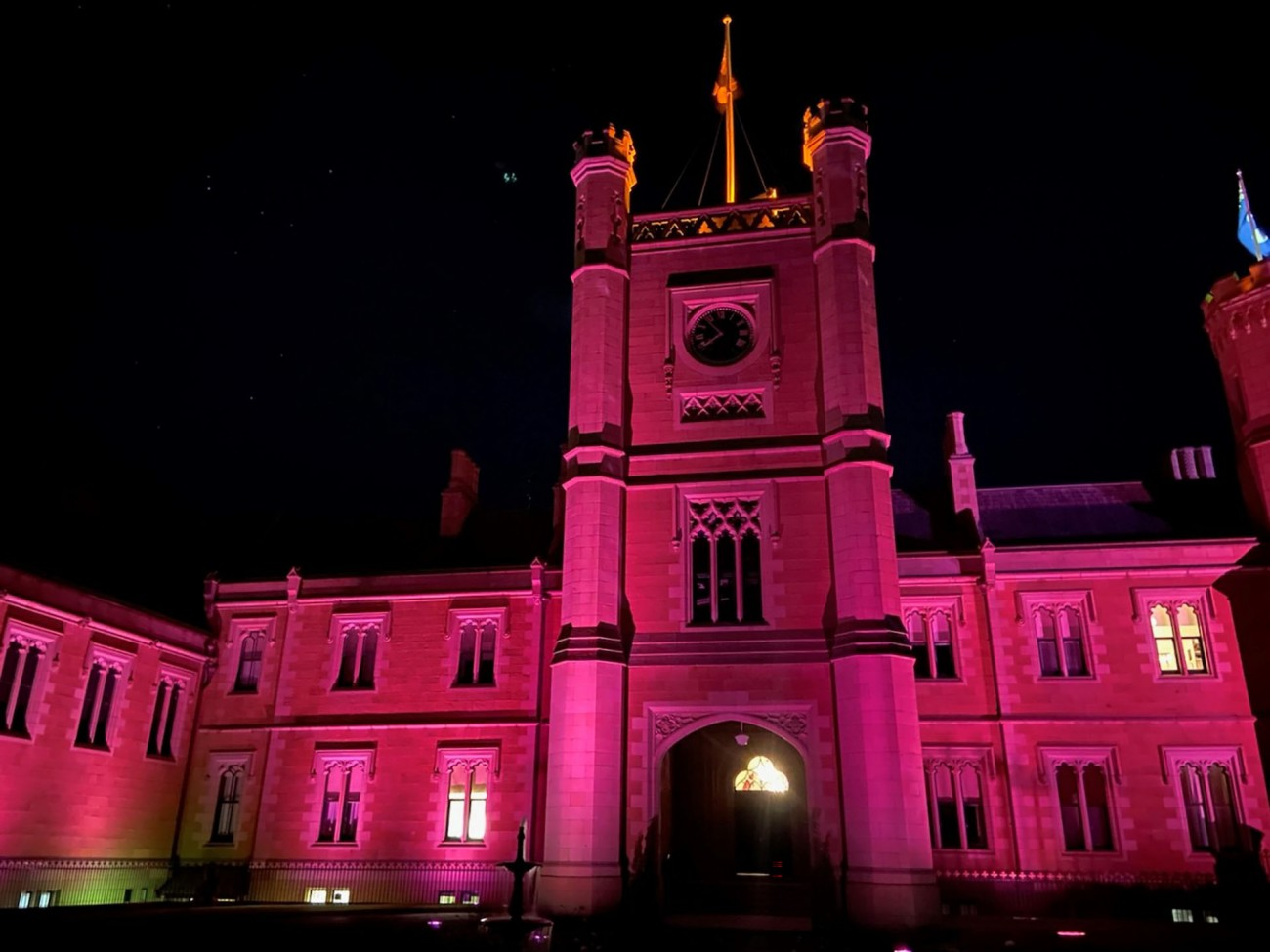
Government House illuminated for the Queen's Platinum Jubilee in 2022

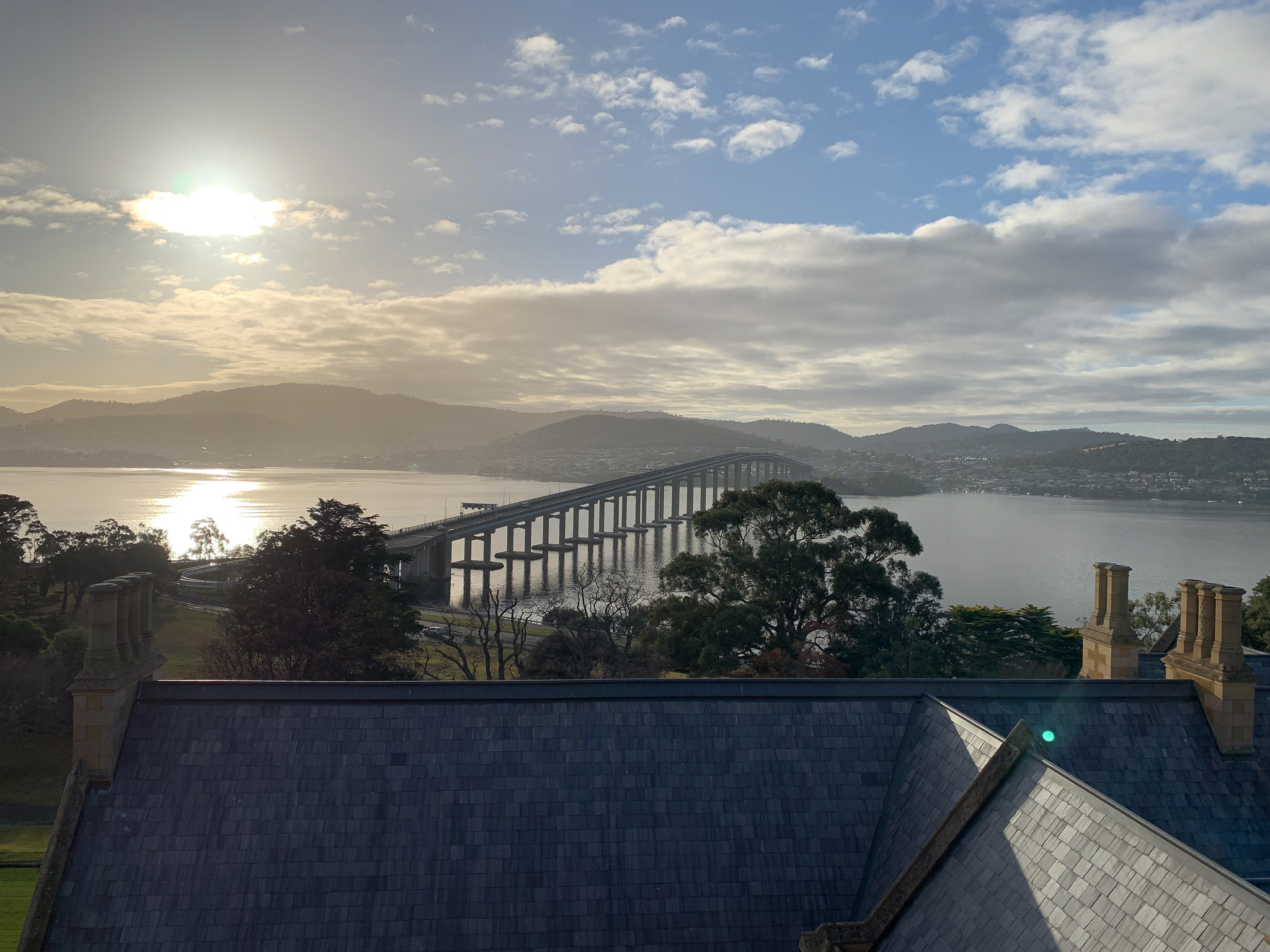
View from the tower to the Tasman Bridge

Tasmania's Government House is today regarded as one of the best vice regal residences in the Commonwealth. Designed by the Director of Public Works and colonial architect William Porden Kay, it is a fine example of an early Victorian country house in Gothic Revival style and is one of the largest of its type in Australia.

Work eventually started in 1855 on a hill of the 37-acre (150,000 m^{2}) grounds that overlooks the Royal Tasmanian Botanical Gardens and the Derwent estuary. Sandstone was quarried on site (the excavated holes were made into ornamental pools), cedar and teak were recycled from an old ship, and slate for the roof was imported from Wales. Furniture was imported from London. Construction was completed in 1857

The House consists of 73 rooms, some of which are Elizabethan and Jacobean Revival styles. The finest rooms are the Main Hall, the Dining Room, the Ante-Drawing Room, the Drawing Room, the French Room, the Ballroom, and the Conservatory. Apart from the Conservatory, which was rebuilt to original designs in 1991, Government House remains as it was when it was first occupied.

The scale, detail and finish of the entrance hall, grand corridor and state rooms together with their furniture are unequalled in Australia. Much of the furniture ordered especially for the house and shipped out from England is still in daily use.

Outstanding exterior features of the house include bas-relief architectural sculptures, exceptional stonework, and individually carved sandstone chimney pots. The House also features ornately designed English gardens.

== Functions ==
On 2 January 1858 Sir Henry Fox Young became the first governor to take up residence, moving to the capital from Government Cottage, Port Arthur, Tasmania.

Apart from being the venue of a busy round of annual receptions, dinners and other events, Government House has since 1990 had an annual open day, an initiative of the then governor of Tasmania, General Sir Phillip Bennett.

== See also ==
- Government Houses of Australia
- Government Houses in the Commonwealth
- Governors of Tasmania
