= Bathurst Street, Hobart =

Street in Hobart, Tasmania

Bathurst Street Tasmania
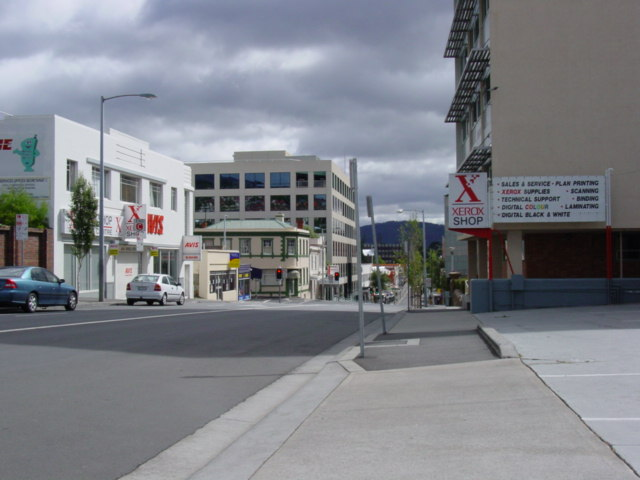
- Bathurst Street, Hobart

General information
- Type: Street
- Length: 1.7 km (1.1 mi)

Major junctions
- North-East end: Brooker Highway
- West end: Cavell Street

Location(s)
- Suburb(s): Hobart CBD, West Hobart

Bathurst Street is a street in Hobart, Tasmania. The street was named by Lachlan Macquarie in honour of Henry Bathurst, 3rd Earl Bathurst.

Along the street at the Playhouse Theatre (Mathers Place) and State Library of Tasmania is the site of the Farm Gate Market ('Farmy'), which begins at the bell of 8:30am every Sunday morning, trading breakfast at 8am and from vendors of Tasmanian-grown produce until 1pm. It began in 2009.

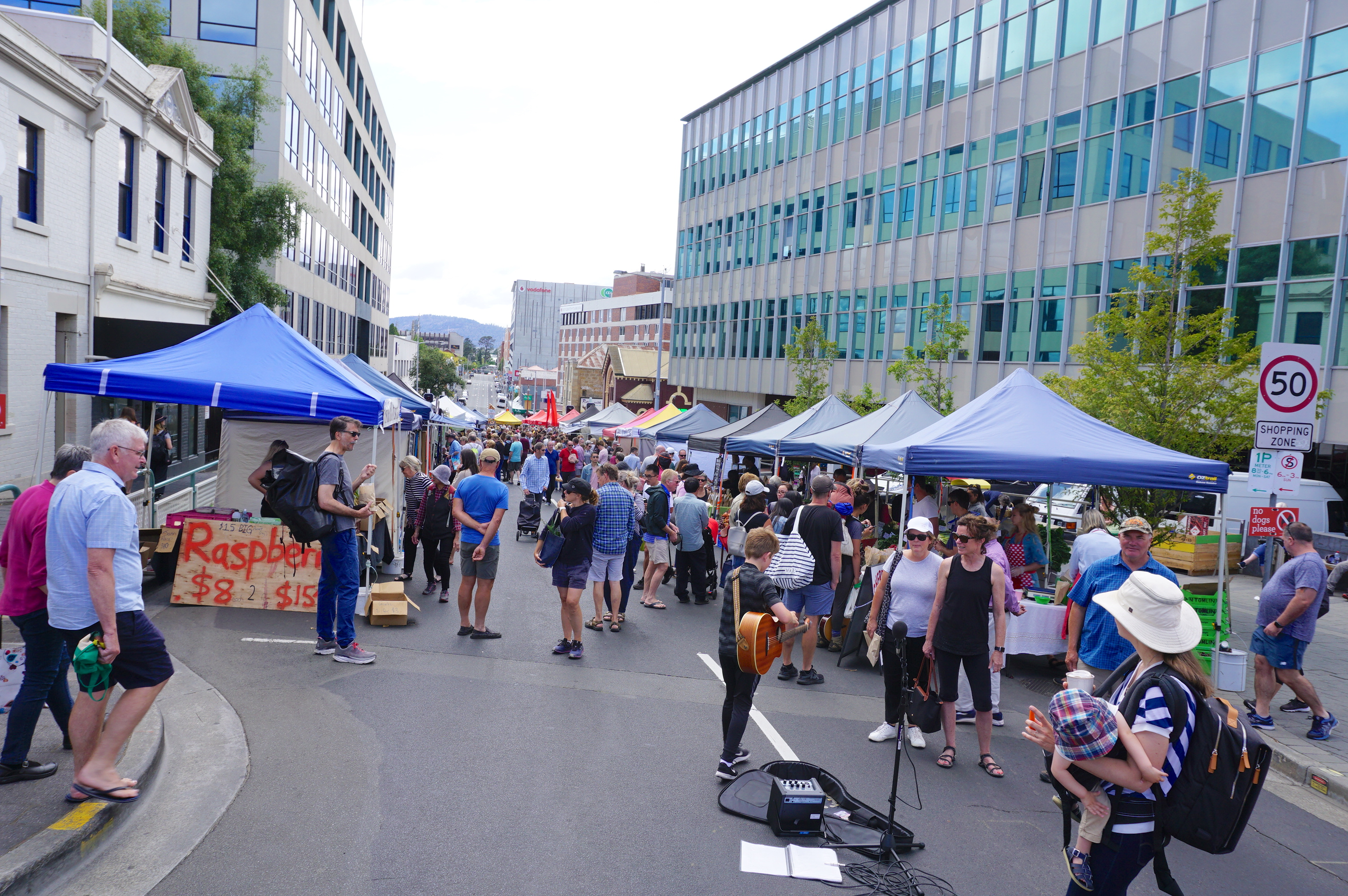
Farm Gate Market from Murray Street
