= Hobart City Centre =

Coordinates: 42°52′50″S 147°19′30″E

- Suburb
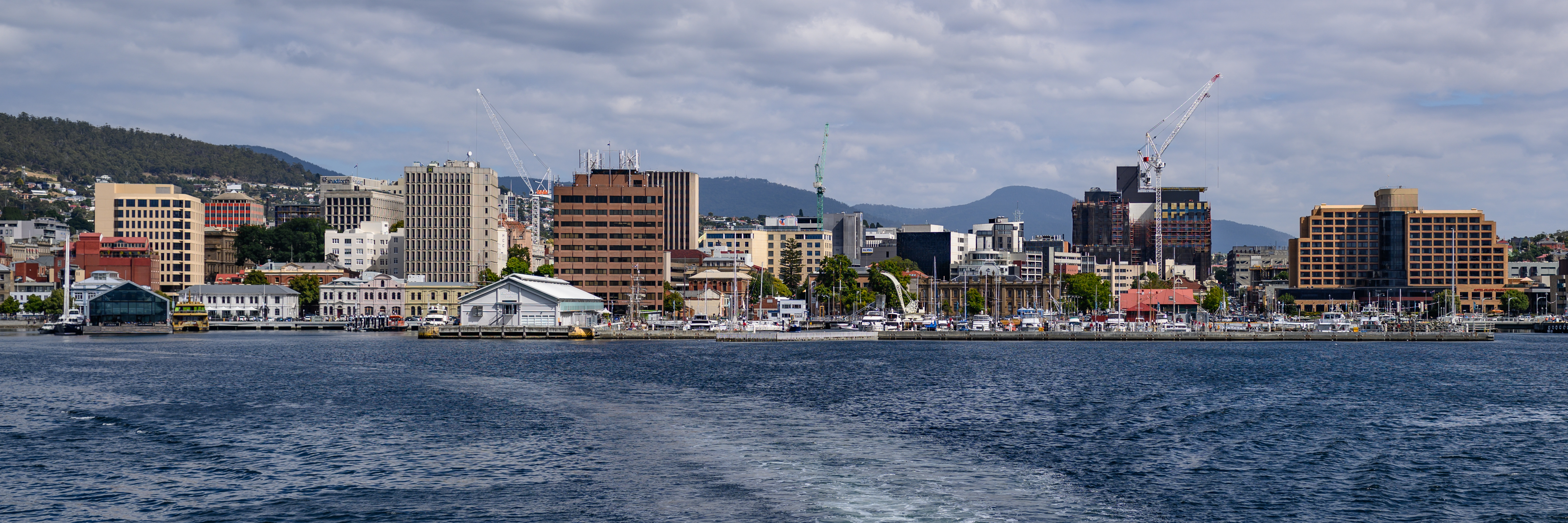
- The Hobart City Centre in 2019
- Interactive map of Hobart City Centre
- Country: Australia
- State: Tasmania
- City: Hobart
- LGA: City of Hobart
- Established: 1803

Government
  - State electorate: Clark
  - Federal division: Clark

Area
  - Total: 1.9 km^{2} (0.73 sq mi)

Population
  - Total: 3,390 (2021)
  - Density: 1,780/km^{2} (4,620/sq mi)
- Postcode: 7000, 7001
Suburbs around Hobart City Centre
West Hobart	North Hobart	Glebe
West Hobart	Hobart City Centre	Glebe
South Hobart	Sullivans Cove	Sullivans Cove

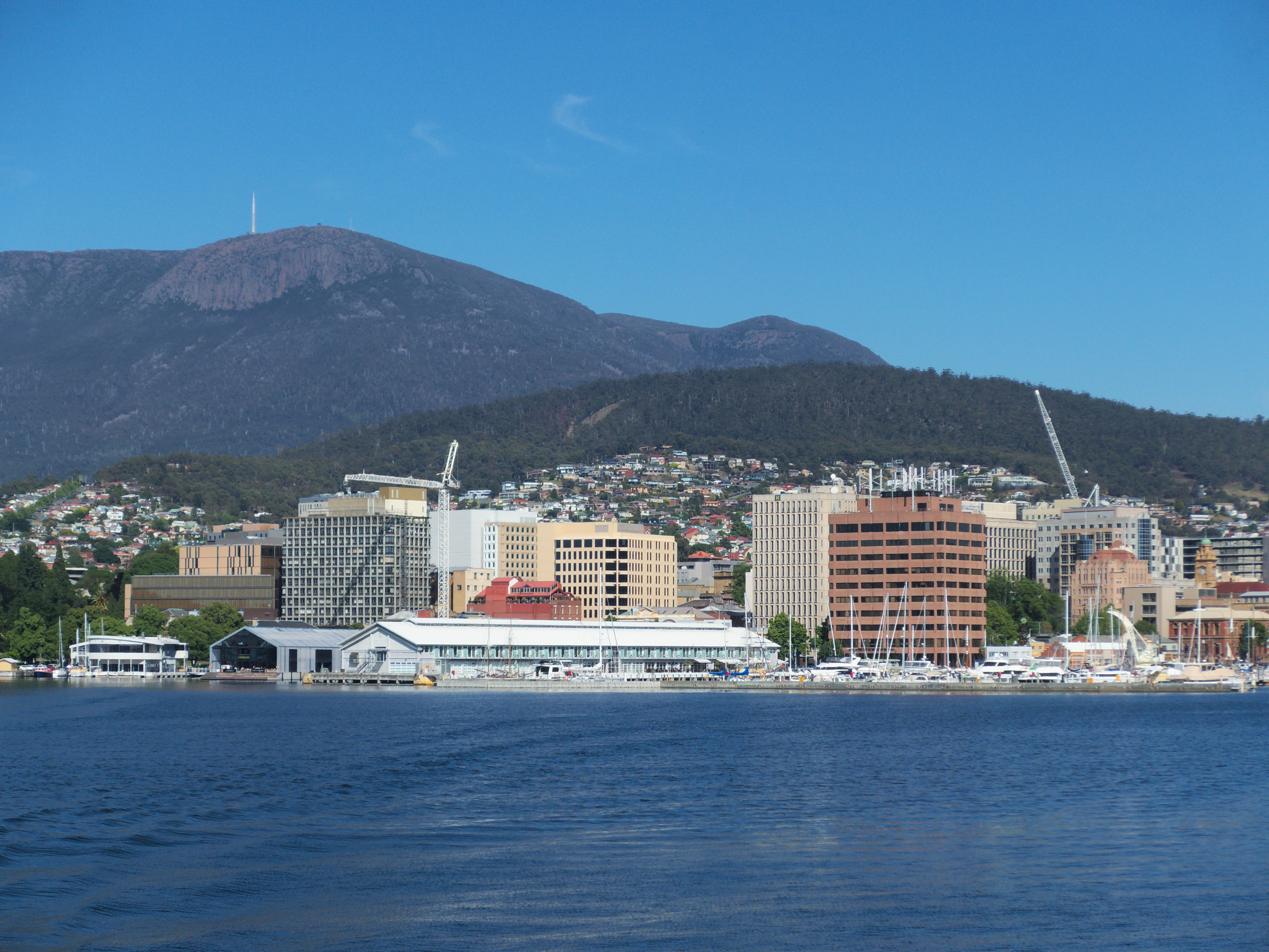
Hobart with kunanyi / Mt Wellington

The Hobart City Centre (referred to as the Hobart CBD) is a suburb surrounded by metropolitan Hobart, Tasmania, Australia, which comprises the original settlement, the central business district, and other built-up areas. It is the oldest part of Hobart and includes many of the city's important institutions and landmarks, such as Parliament House, the Supreme Court of Tasmania, Franklin Square, Elizabeth Street Mall, the Royal Hobart Hospital, the Theatre Royal, the Odeon Theatre, the State Library of Tasmania, the NAB Building, and the Tasmanian Museum and Art Gallery. The city centre is located within the local government area of the City of Hobart.

Although the city centre is one of the oldest and most developed areas of Hobart, demographically it is one of the less densely populated areas in the greater area of Hobart, due to its core being commercial. In an attempt to create a more vibrant city at night, the state government has been encouraging inner city residential development in recent years. The population of the city centre was 3,390 in 2021.

== History ==
Settlement of Greater Hobart spawned from the settlement of Sullivans Cove on 21 February 1804, by order of David Collins who was most unimpressed with the initial landing site at Risdon Cove.

On 11 March 2020, the Hobart City Council released a baseline report on the Central Hobart Precincts Plan which had a purpose "to guide future growth in a way that will strengthen what’s great about Hobart". The study area covered 1364 lots of land in 64 blocks. The website outlines four general goals to:

- establish a shared vision and framework for the future growth of Central Hobart and identify a set of actions to deliver it;
- identify a suite of precincts across the study area and outline a vision for each of them ensuring the ongoing viability of Central Hobart as Tasmania's key administrative and commercial activity centre;
- identify opportunities for increased residential densities and infrastructure as well as commercial and community services to support it; and
- identify the preferred urban form and scale of development for precincts based on a range of urban design, heritage, economic and social considerations.

Despite its location between mountains and water, Hobart has the lowest population density of a state capital in Australia which is further reflected by the city centre containing little housing. The city's housing and renting costs are also the highest per capita. The significance of this to the broader region means the City aims to encourage infill development (dubbed missing middle housing) "to increase the supply of housing and reduce pressure for urban sprawl". With a focus on sustainability, it also wants to add diversity to its transportation infrastructure and the friendliness of streets to people (following "Movement and Place" principles, including planting street trees).

== Geography ==
The Hobart central business district draws a sense of its identity from its location between the River Derwent and the foothills of Mount Wellington. The city is concentrated with low-rise buildings, interspersed by parks such as Franklin Square and St Davids Park and historic precincts such as Sullivans Cove and Salamanca Place. The majority of Hobart CBD's streets are one-way with a few exceptions including Elizabeth Street, the main north–south thoroughfare of the city centre. Davey and Macquarie streets form a one-way couplet carrying traffic between Hobart's major highways along the CBD's southern fringe. Proposed as far back as the 1940s, the six main streets were converted to one-way on 25 October 1959. The streets run on a slightly warped grid pattern in the CBD, due to early planning by Lachlan Macquarie.

== Governance ==
Administratively, the Hobart City Centre falls under the authority of the local government area of the City of Hobart. The Tasmanian Government also has authority over some aspects of the CBD, in particular the major state controlled roads passing through and around the city.

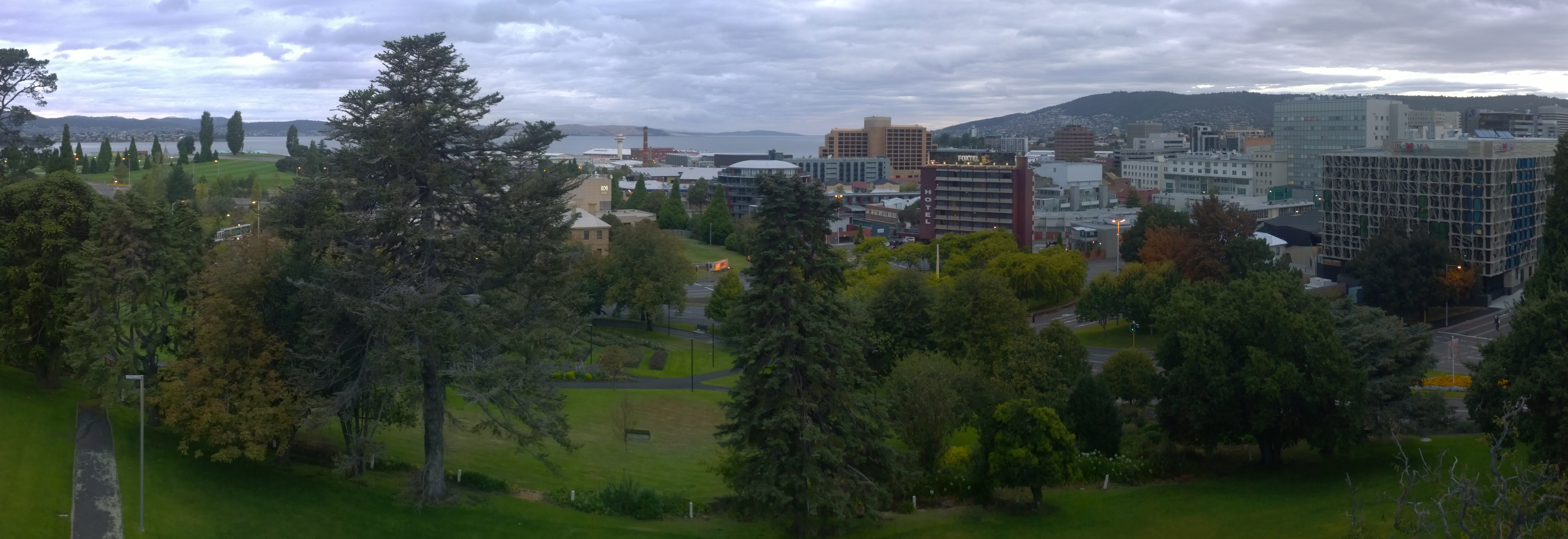
The Hobart City Centre at Dawn

== Commercial area ==
With the exception of Wrest Point Casino in Sandy Bay, the Hobart CBD contains all of Tasmania’s tallest buildings, including 39 Murray Street, 188 Collins Street and the Trafalgar Building. The tallest building in the city centre is NAB House at 58 m (190 ft), however planning restrictions limit future developments to a height of 42 m (138 ft). There have been some exceptions to this rule such as Wellington Centre standing at 48 m (157 ft) and the new Royal Hobart Hospital K1/K2 Twin Towers which stand at 48 m (157 ft) high. The City centre has several shopping areas including the Wellington Centre, Centrepoint and the historically significant Cat & Fiddle Arcade. Stores in this area include Myer, Target, Woolworths, H&M, JB Hi-Fi, Kathmandu and Country Road. In September 2007, a spectacular inner city fire was responsible for the loss of one of Hobart's Myer buildings and as a result saw the construction of the 40 m (130 ft) Icon Complex, boasting a 5 level Myer with specialty shops as well as a Hotel with roof top bar.

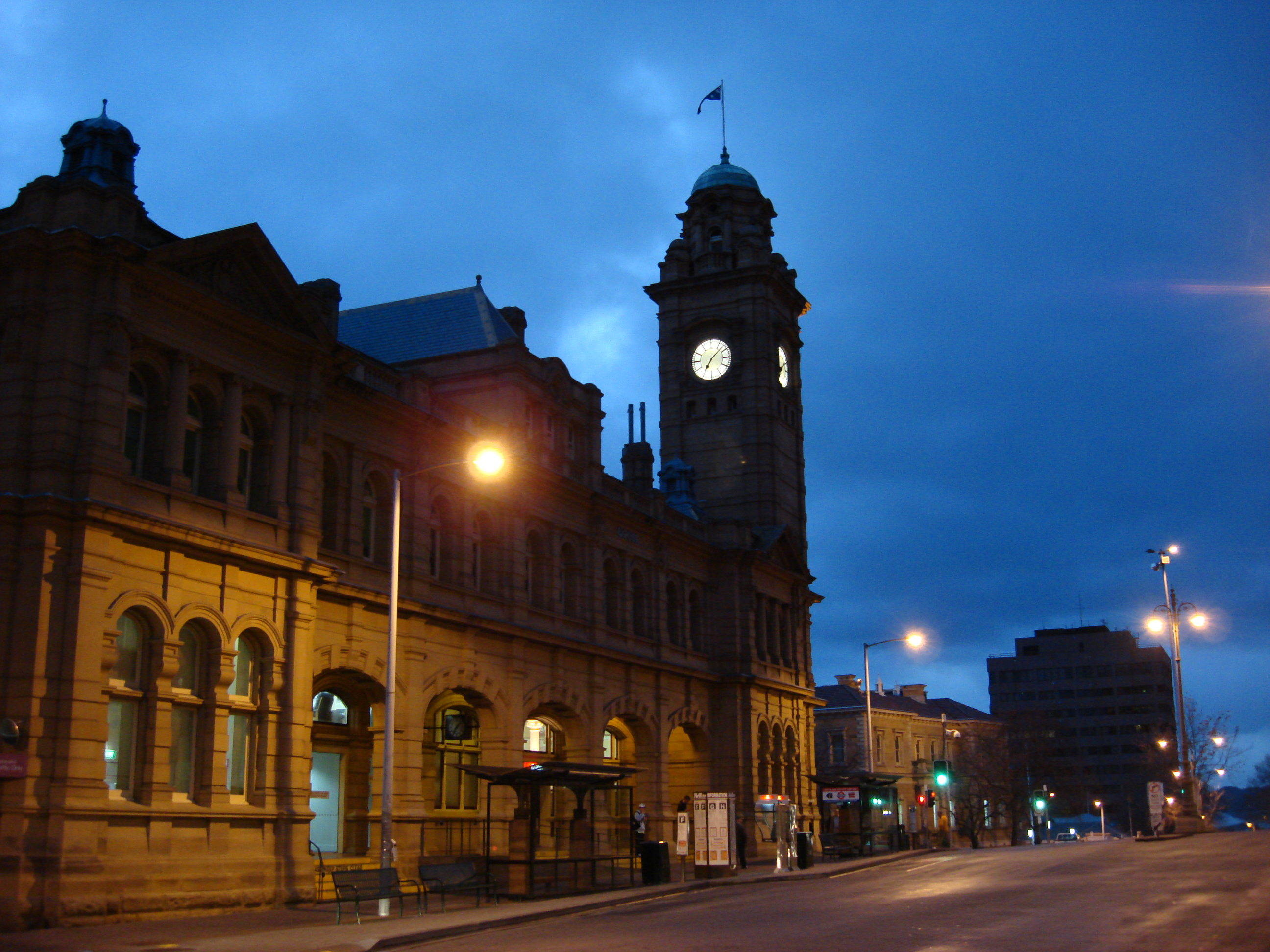
Hobart GPO within the Hobart Bus Mall on Elizabeth Street.

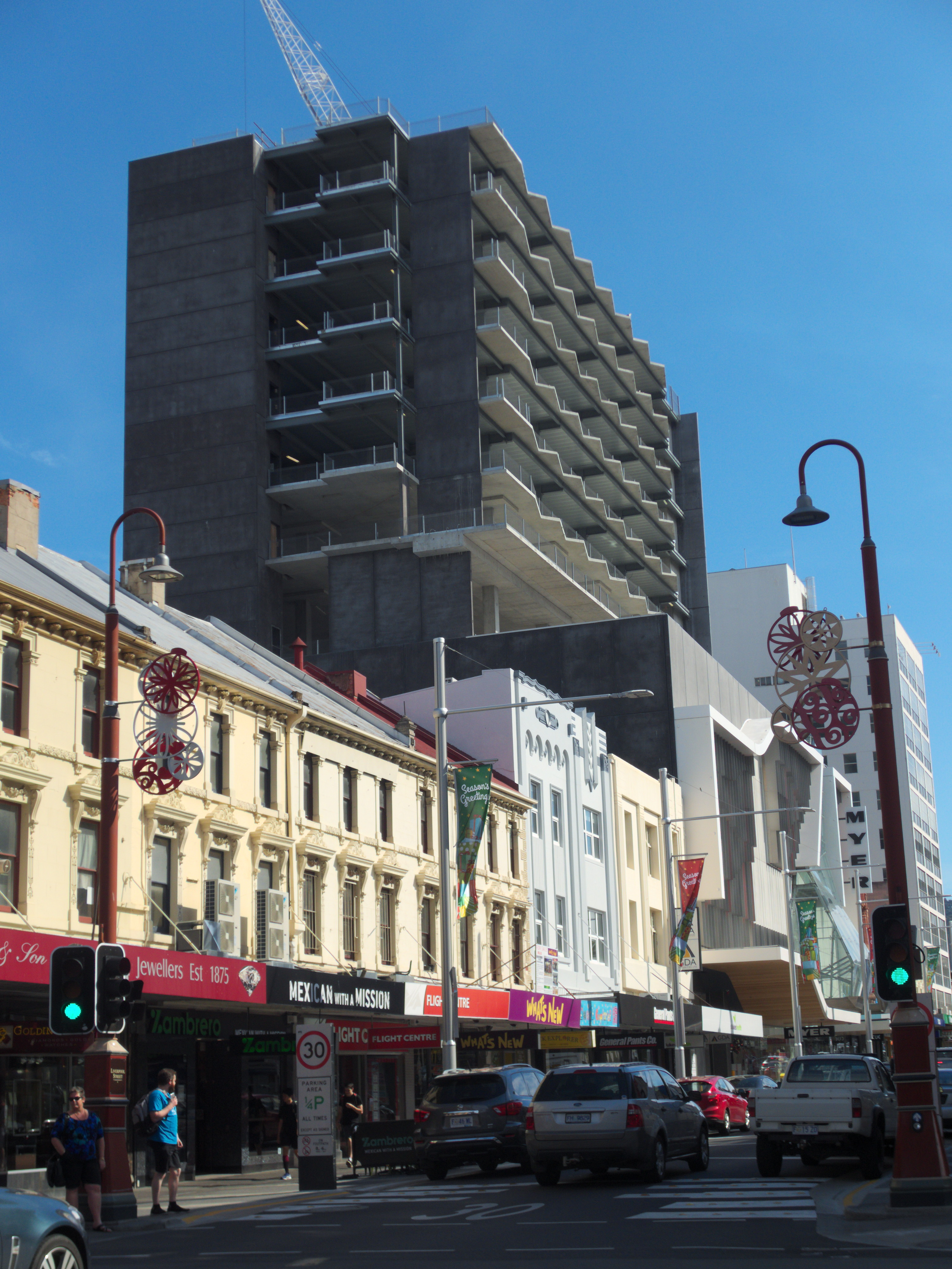
Myer ICON Complex on Liverpool Street

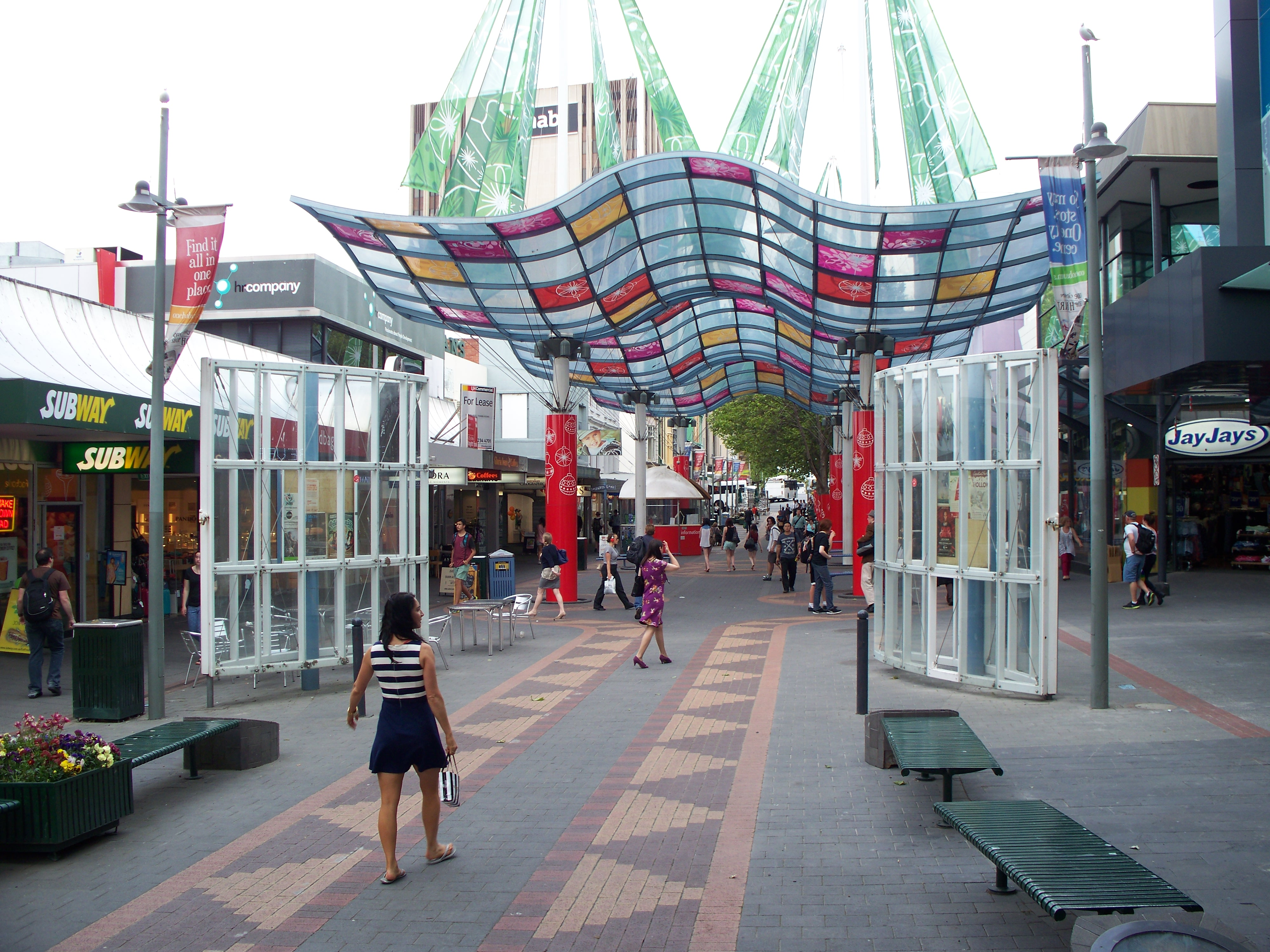
The Elizabeth Street Mall in the Hobart CBD, looking south from the Liverpool Street intersection.

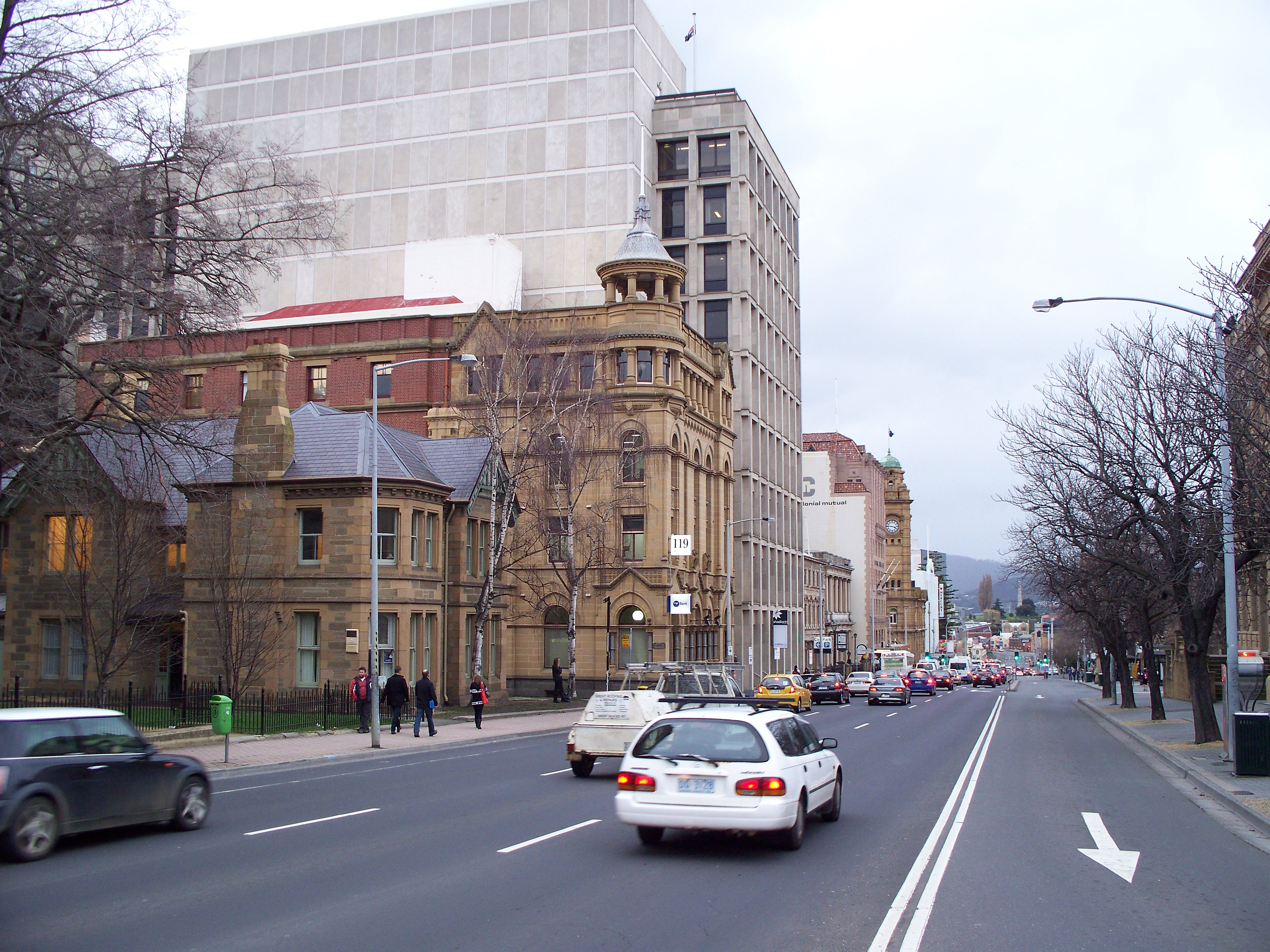
Macquarie Street in the Hobart CBD, looking east from the Murray Street intersection.

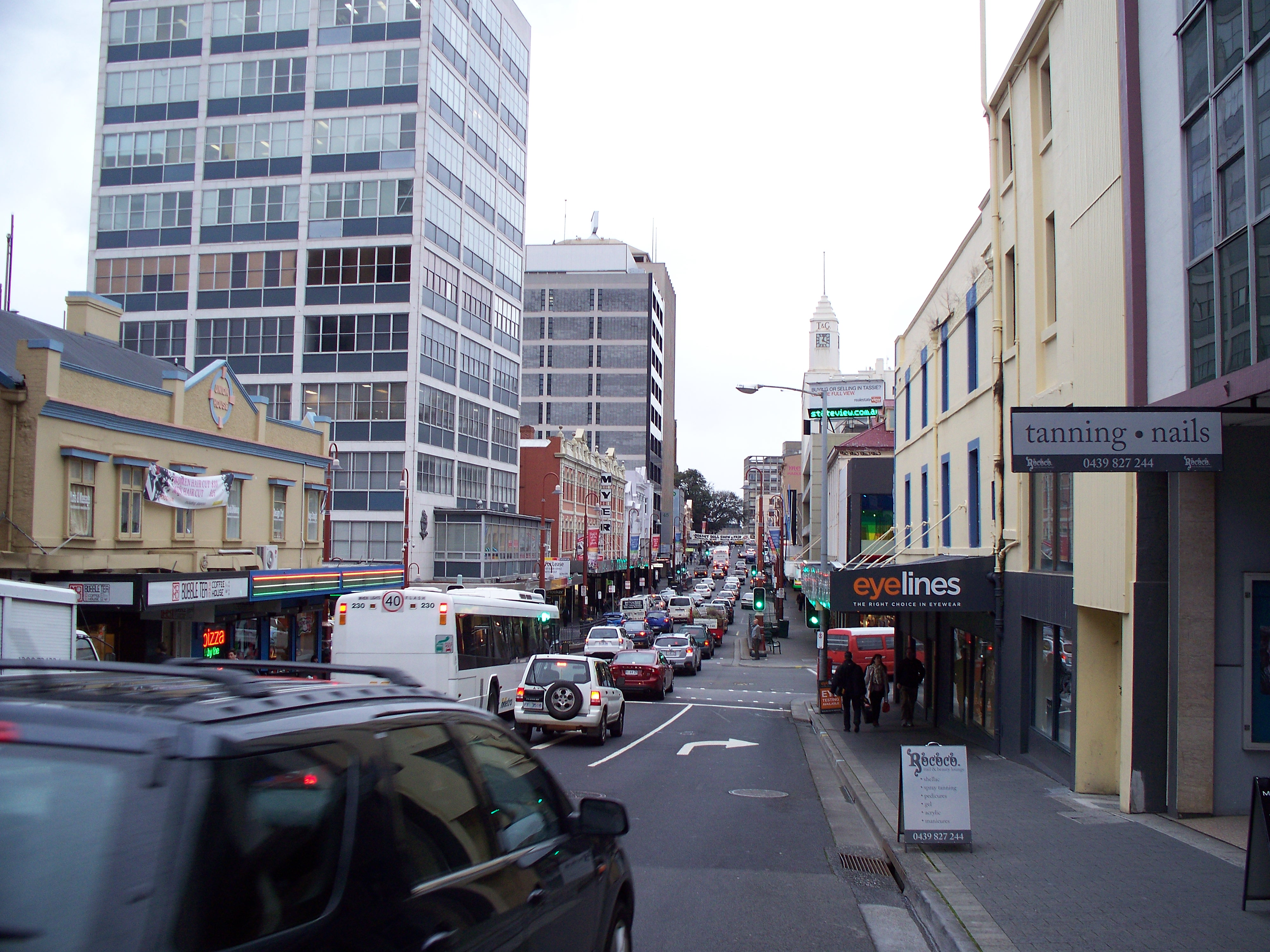
Murray Street in the Hobart CBD, looking south at the Liverpool Street intersection.

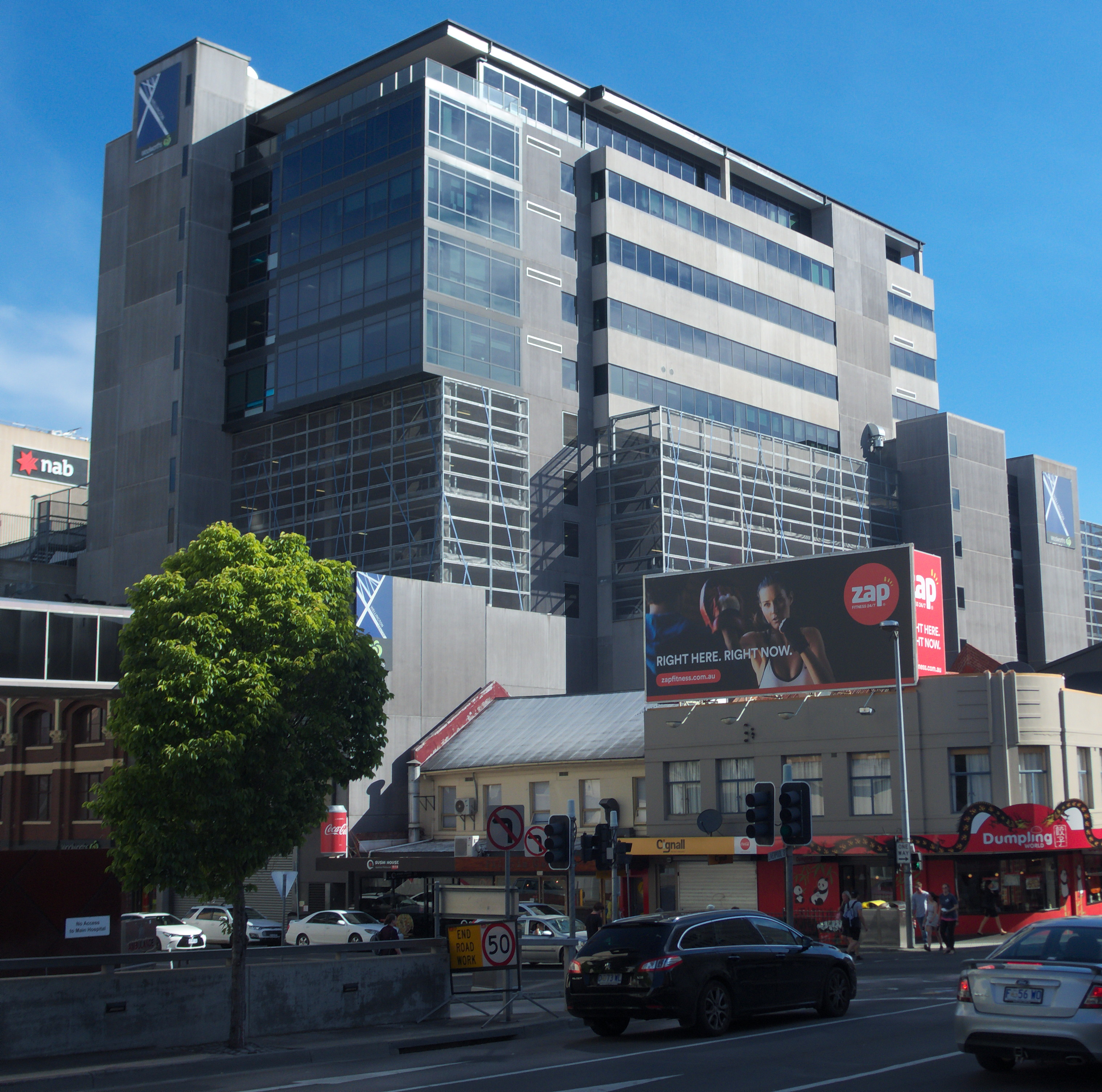
Wellington Centre from Liverpool Street

== Culture ==
There is a large concentration of cultural institutions within the CBD including: the Tasmanian Museum and Art Gallery, the State Library of Tasmania, the Odeon Theatre, the Playhouse Theatre, and the Theatre Royal.

Every December, the city hosts the conclusion of the Sydney to Hobart Yacht Race while concurrently holding the Taste Festival. Every January the city hosts the Australian Wooden Boat Festival and the annual Royal Hobart Regatta is held during February.

Additional, the Salamanca Market is held at Salamanca Place every Saturday.

== See also ==
- City of Hobart
- List of tallest buildings in Hobart
- List of theatres in Hobart
