= List of tallest buildings in Hobart =

A list of Hobart's tallest buildings

Tall buildings in Hobart
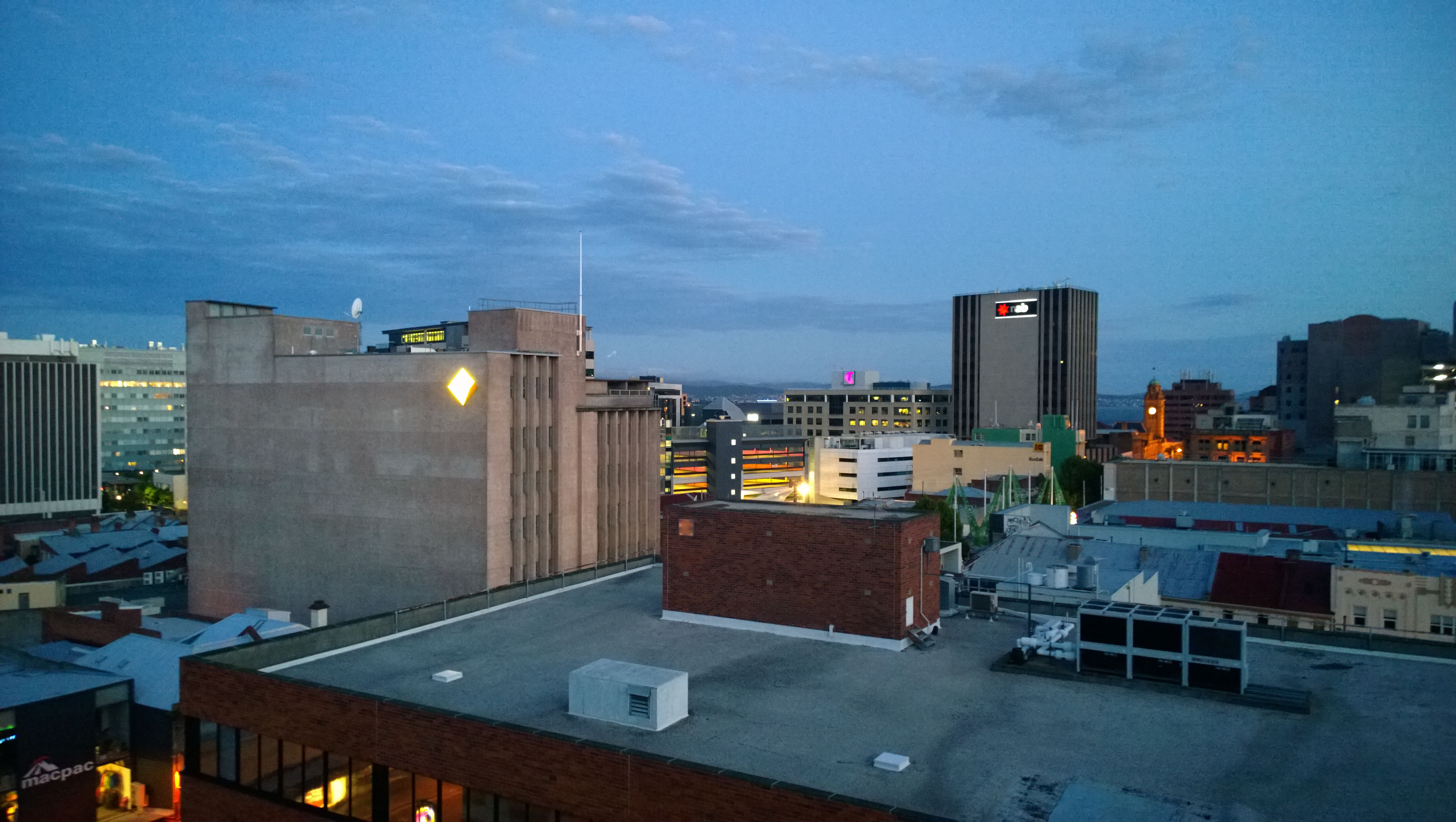
- Hobart City Centre in 2013, pictured at dusk
- Tallest building: Wrest Point Hotel Casino (1973)
- Tallest building height: 73 m (240 ft)

Number of tall buildings
- Taller than 50 m (164 ft): 9 (2025)

This list of tallest buildings in Hobart ranks the tallest in the city of Hobart, Tasmania, Australia, by height. This ranking system, created by the United States–based Council on Vertical Urbanism (formerly Council on Tall Buildings and Urban Habitat) includes the height to a spire but not to an antenna. Most of the buildings in this table are within the Hobart central business district; however, the 19-storey Wrest Point Hotel Casino, which is the tallest building in Tasmania at 73 metres (240 ft), is located several kilometres away.

Hobart currently has a range of height limits in the city to preserve an established low-rise character, with 42 metres (138 ft) being the maximum allowable height overall. There are several buildings above this height that were constructed prior to the current height restrictions and the Hobart City Council has made exceptions to certain developments if it is found that the development in question would benefit the city. There are also rules in the Tasmanian Planning Scheme limiting residential heights outside of the CBD.

The tallest structure in Tasmania is a transmission tower on Mount Wellington standing at 130 m (427 ft). The tallest buildings in Tasmania outside Hobart include the Shot Tower, Taroona, at 58 metres and the Silos Hotel in Launceston at 46 metres.

== Tallest buildings ==
Rank	Name	Image	Height (m)	Floors	Year	Purpose	Address	Notes
1	Wrest Point Casino		73 m (240 ft)	19	1973	Hotel	410 Sandy Bay Road	Designed by Roy Grounds and the tallest building in the state of Tasmania.
2	Royal Hobart Hospital K Block		68.5 m (225 ft)	10	2020	Hospital	Campbell Street	The tallest building within the Hobart CBD, designed by Lyons Architecture
3	Mövenpick Hotel		62.2 m (204 ft)	18	2021	Hotel	28 Elizabeth Street	Designed by Jaws Architects
4	NAB House (formerly the AMP Building)		58 m (190 ft)	14	1968	Commercial	86 Collins Street	Designed by Crawford Shurman Wegman Architects
5	Vibe Hotel		57 m (187 ft)	15	2021	Hotel	36 Argyle Street	Designed by Xsquared Architects
6	Icon Complex		53 m (174 ft)	13	2018	Mixed	96-108 Liverpool Street	Incorporating Myer Hobart and Crowne Plaza Hotel
7	Commonwealth Government Centre		52 m (171 ft)	16	1976	Government	188 Collins Street	
8	144 Macquarie Street (formerly TGIO Building)		51.4 m (169 ft)	12	1974	Commercial	144 Macquarie Street	Refurbishment and height extension designed by Xsquared Architects and completed 2014/15
9	Trafalgar Building		50 m (160 ft)	15	1987	Mixed	108-100 Collins Street	
= 10	Jaffa Building		48 m (157 ft)	14	1978	Commercial	39 Murray Street	Designed by JS Moon of BPSM Architects
= 10	Wellington Centre		48 m (157 ft)	14	2012	Mixed	42 Argyle Street	Designed by Jaws Architects
= 12	Hydro Tasmania Building		46 m (151 ft)	12	1972	Commercial	4 Elizabeth Street	
= 12	Shadforth Building		46 m (151 ft)	10	1978	Commercial	111 Macquarie Street	
14	65 Murray Street		45 m (148 ft)	12	1961	Commercial	65 Murray Street	Designed by Philip Lighton Floyd and Beattie
15	Deloitte Building (formerly ANZ Centre)		44 m (144 ft)	11	1992	Commercial	22 Elizabeth Street	
= 16	University of Tasmania student accommodation		43 m (141 ft)	15	2017	Residential	49 Melville Street	
= 16	Mantra on Collins		43 m (141 ft)	11	2009	Hotel	58 Collins Street	
= 18	Empress Towers		42 m (138 ft)	12	1967	Residential	1-3 Battery Square	
= 18	Hotel Grand Chancellor		42 m (138 ft)	12	1987	Hotel	1 Davey Street	
= 18	Royal Hobart Hospital A Block		42 m (138 ft)	11	1967	Hospital	48 Liverpool Street	
= 18	DoubleTree by Hilton	—N/a	42 m (138 ft)	12	2024	Hotel	179 Macquarie Street	Designed by Scanlan Architects
= 22	Tasmanian Banking Services Building	—N/a	40 m (130 ft)	11	1979	Commercial	45 Murray Street	
= 22	Executive Building		40 m (130 ft)	10	1988	Government	15 Murray Street	
= 22	Lands Building		40 m (130 ft)	10	1976	Government	134 Macquarie Street	
= 25	Marine Board Building		39 m (128 ft)	11	1972	Commercial	1 Franklin Wharf	
= 25	Hobart Corporate Centre	—N/a	39 m (128 ft)	11	1994	Commercial	85 Macquarie Street	

10 Murray Street was demolished in 2018 in the Parliament Square redevelopment, but formerly stood at a height of 47 m (154 ft).

== Under construction or approved ==
This is a list of the tallest buildings under construction or approved in Hobart.

Under construction
Approved

Name	Height		Storeys	Purpose	Completion	Location	Status
Name	m	ft	Storeys	Purpose	Completion	Location	Status
174–192 Liverpool Street	51	167	12	Commercial	TBA	City centre	Approved
25 Watchorn Street (Hanging Garden)	40.5	133	9	Commercial	TBA	City centre	Approved

== See also ==
- List of tallest buildings in Australia
- List of tallest buildings in Oceania
