= Trafalgar Building =

The Trafalgar Building can refer to:

- Part of the Îlot-Trafalgar-Gleneagles complex in Montreal, Quebec, Canada
- The Trafalgar Building, Hobart, in Hobart, Tasmania, Australia
