= 1968 Tasmanian casino referendum =

Referendum in Tasmania, Australia

- 14 December 1968
- Are you in favour of the provisions of "Wrest Point Casino Licence and Development Act, 1968", the full text of which has been published in the newspapers?
- Outcome: Carried.

Results
Choice	Votes	%
Yes	96,839	53.00%
No	85,862	47.00%
Valid votes	182,701	88.63%
Invalid or blank votes	23,443	11.37%
Total votes	206,144	100.00%
Registered voters/turnout	206,144	100%
- Results by electoral division

The Tasmanian casino referendum was a one-question referendum held on 14 December 1968, which concerned the granting of Australia's first casino licence to the Federal Group to operate the Wrest Point Hotel Casino in Sandy Bay.

== Background ==
The Wrest Point Riviera hotel was purchased by the Federal Group in the 1960s, and the new owners approached Premier Eric Reece about the prospect of the Tasmanian government granting a licence to create an entertainment complex and convention centre that would contain a small casino on the premises, citing that it would attract tourists during Tasmania's traditional winter "tourist slump". Reece agreed that a casino would be a tourism attraction in Tasmania and together with health minister Merv Everett began to promote the development. Despite a vigorous campaign there was considerable opposition to the casino bill when it was introduced to parliament on 4 October 1968 as no casino licence had been granted in Australia before. Two weeks later The Mercury newspaper reported the bill was likely to be lost by one or two votes. Reece and Everett then withdrew the bill and on 31 October 1968 announced a referendum would take place to decide the issue.

The legislation to permit the referendum was itself highly contentious and did not pass parliament until 21 November 1968, after which the date of the referendum was set to be three weeks later on 14 December. With the vote on a knife's edge, it is alleged that the government deliberately proposed a question that was opaque. The question put to the people was:

Are you in favour of the provisions of "Wrest Point Casino Licence and Development Act, 1968", the full text of which has been published in the newspapers?"

== Vote on the bill ==
Despite having a vote on the bill scheduled in December, and with the campaigning already underway, the state Labor government, realising they had the numbers on the floor of the parliament, brought the bill to a vote on 6 November 1968. After a non-stop thirty-hour debate and with the vocal opponent Mac Le Fevre overseas and not paired, the bill passed at 5am on 8 November 1968.

In effect, the electorate was being asked to vote on a bill that had already been passed.

== Results ==
Result
State	Electoral roll	Valid votes	For		Against	
State	Electoral roll	Valid votes	Vote	%	Vote	%
Bass	40,472	34,989	16,622	47.51	18,367	52.49
Braddon	42,420	37,189	18,453	49.62	18,736	50.38
Denison	43,529	38,814	22,407	57.73	16,407	42.27
Franklin	38,248	34,838	20,856	59.85	13,982	40.13
Wilmot	41,475	36,871	18,501	50.18	18,370	49.82
Total	206,144	182,701	96,839	53.00	85,862	47.00

=== Summary ===
- Yes: 96,839 (53%); No: 85,862 (47%)
- Turnout: 92.67%
- Informal votes: 8,339

== Aftermath ==
The referendum passed by a margin of 6%, although the bill had already passed in October that year, granting the licence to the Federal Group. There was considerable opposition to the casino, and concern over the fact that a monopoly licence was awarded to Federal Hotels without any call for a tender.

The Wrest Point Hotel Casino was completed and opened in 1973.

In 1985, the casino introduced poker machines, to much opposition. The pokies have since spread around the state.

== See also ==
- Kevin Lyons
