= NAB House =

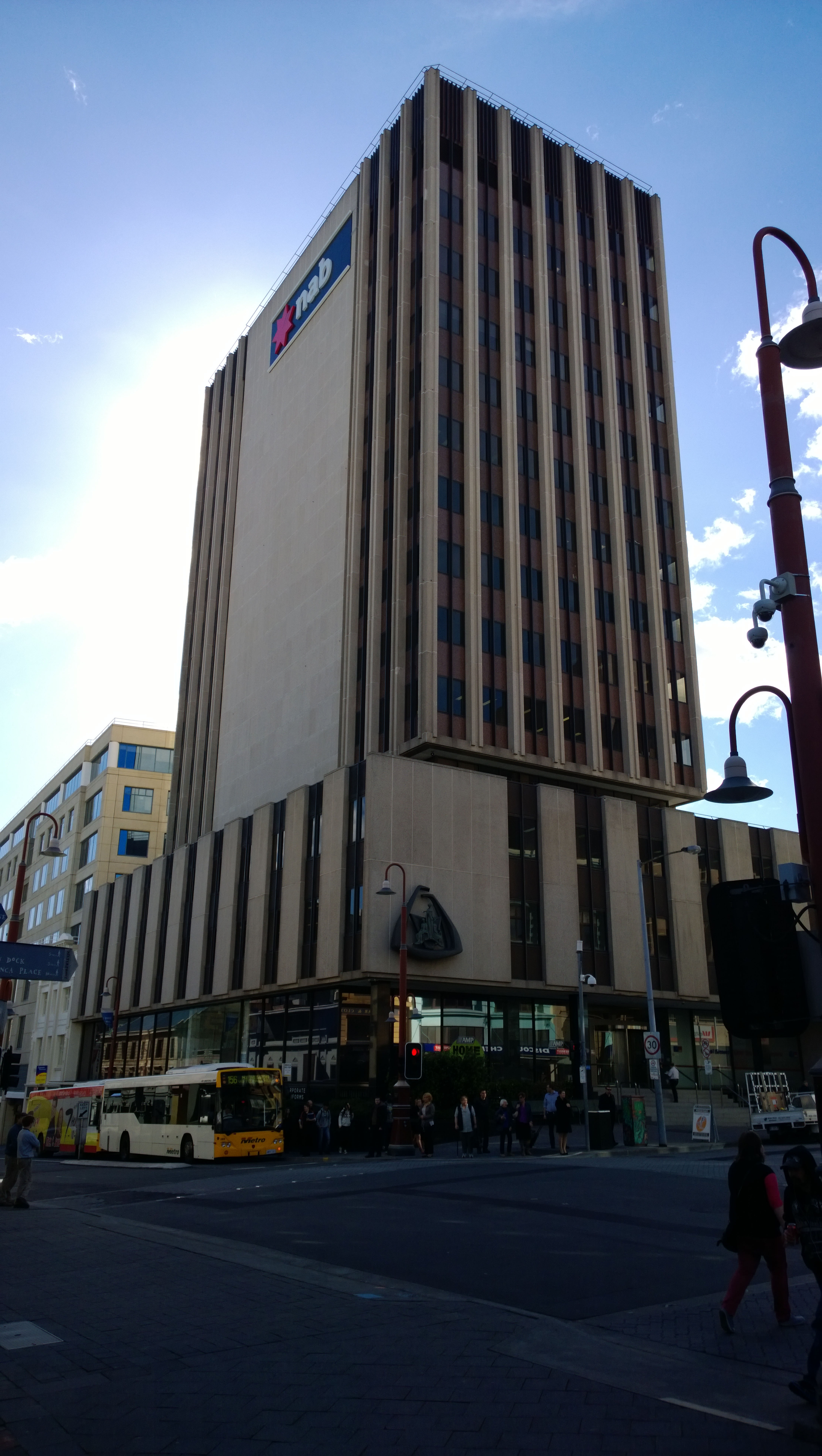
- NAB House

General information
- Type: Office tower
- Location: 86 Collins Street, Hobart
- Coordinates: 42.881988°S 147.32946°E
- Completed: 1968
- Opening: 1968

Height
- Roof: 58 m (190 ft)

Technical details
- Floor count: 14

Design and construction
- Architects: Charles Crawford of Crawford deBavay and Cripps references =

Website
- www.kalisproperty.com.au/tolease

NAB House (formerly known as the AMP Building) is an A-grade office building situated in Hobart, Tasmania. It is the 4th tallest building in Hobart.

== History and Construction ==
In 1884, the Australian Mutual Provident Society (AMP) constructed their first Hobart offices on the corner of Collins and Elizabeth Streets, Hobart. The A.M.P Society building, which was designed by Henry Hunter, was a large three-storey building with a sandstone façade and figurehead typical of Victorian-era architectural works. These offices were reconstructed and redeveloped in 1913, and subsequently featured a large sandstone archway entrance. In 1968, the building was demolished for the construction of a newer and more modern office tower which stands to this present day.

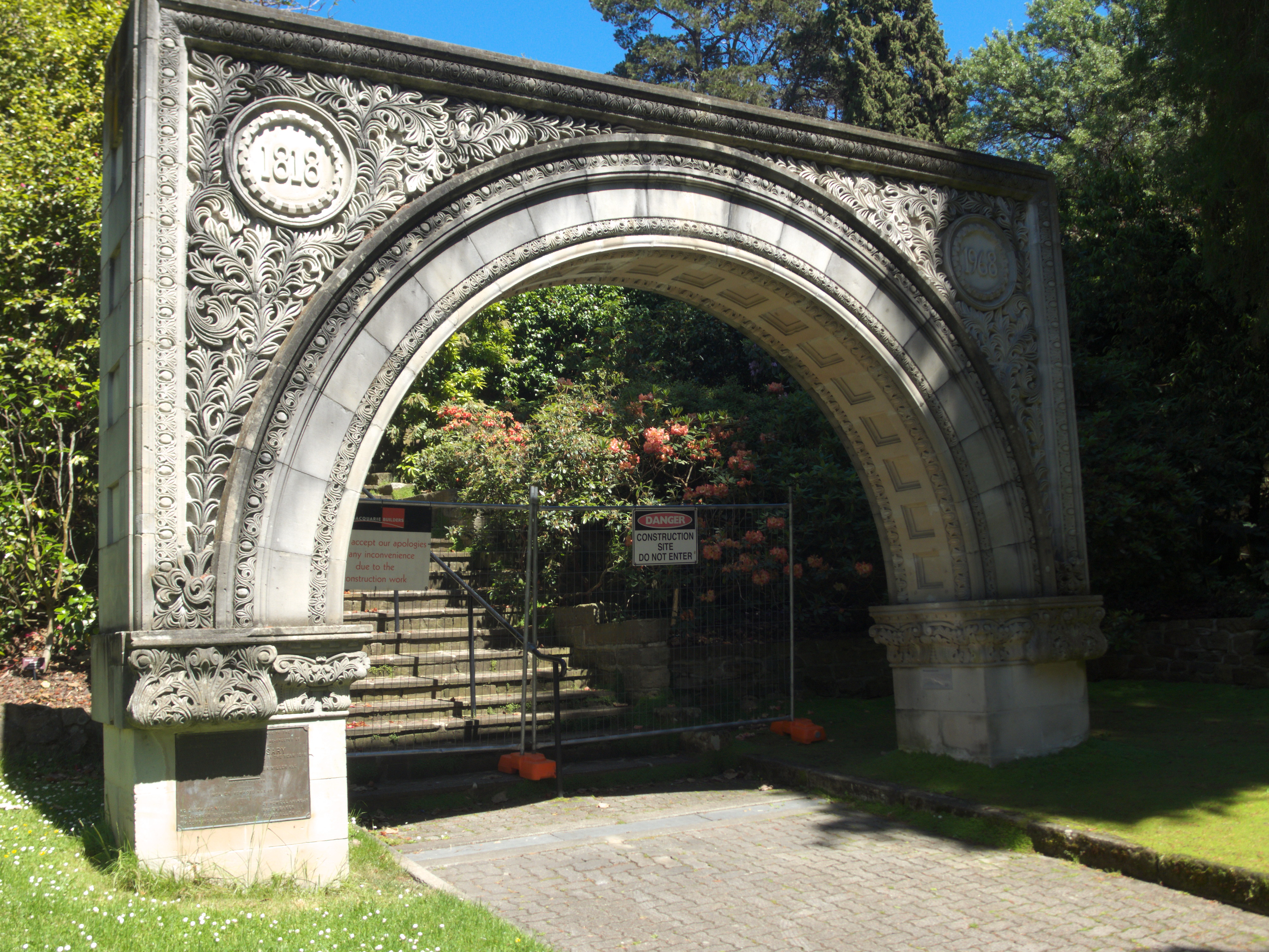
Anniversary Arch in the botanical gardens

The tall sandstone archway which stood over the entrance to the original 1913 building was donated by AMP in 1968 to the Royal Tasmanian Botanical Gardens, where it received a decorative carving commemorating the foundation of the Gardens and the re-erection of the archway. The arch has since been a large feature of the gardens, and a plaque is fitted to it discussing the Gardens and the AMP donation.

The AMP Building, which the new tower was named, became Hobart's tallest building in 1968 until the construction of the Wrest Point Hotel Casino in 1973. In 2011, the primary tenant of the building changed to the National Australia Bank (NAB), and subsequently the building was renamed NAB House. Signage was also added, with the removal of the AMP sign and the installation of an LED-lighted sign.

NAB House remains one of the tallest buildings in Tasmania, and a prominent landmark in Hobart City.

== See also ==
- List of tallest buildings in Hobart
