= Bruce Maitland Carruthers =

Australian physician and surgeon

Bruce Maitland Carruthers O.B.E., M.B., F.R.San.I.
- Born: 23 April 1892; Maitland, New South Wales
- Died: 29 November 1951 (aged 59); Hobart, Tasmania
- Education: Newington College; University of Sydney
- Occupation: Doctor
- Parent: Rev James Edward Curruthers DD

Bruce Maitland Carruthers (23 April 1892 – 29 November 1951) was an Australian physician and surgeon who became Director-General of Health in Tasmania. He served with distinction in two World Wars and was made an Officer of the Order of the British Empire.

== Birth and education ==
Carruthers was born at Maitland, New South Wales, the son of Rev James Edward Carruthers and nephew of Sir Joseph Carruthers, 16th Premier of New South Wales. He attended his father's alma mater, Newington College (1906–1908) and went up to the University of Sydney in 1909 and graduated MB in 1915.

== War service ==
=== World War I ===
Carruthers served with the Royal Army Medical Corps in England, France, Salonika and India from 1914 until 1919 and held the rank of major. After active service he undertook a post-graduate course in medicine in London, becoming a Member and later a Fellow of the Royal Sanitary Institute.

=== World War II ===
In 1940, he rejoined the Australian Army Medical Corps. He served until 1945 and attained the rank of lieutenant colonel and was assistant director of hygiene in the First Australian Army. Carruthers was made an Officer of the Order of the British Empire in the military division for distinguished service in the Middle East.

== Medical career ==
=== New South Wales ===
Following World War I, Carruthers became a resident medical officer at the Coast Hospital. Until 1927 he worked mainly in mental diseases and undertook post-graduate studies in psychiatry at the University of Sydney. He worked at Callan Park and was in charge of five Red Cross nerve hospitals in Sydney tending ex-servicemen. He was also associated with Randwick Repatriation Hospital and worked in private practice.

=== Tasmania ===
From 1927 until 1935 Carruthers was the senior house surgeon at the Royal Hobart Hospital and then for a year he was administrator of the Lachlan Park Hospital. He was appointed the Tasmanian Director of Public Health in 1936 and served in that capacity until rejoining the army in World War II. At war's end Carruthers was appointed Director of Hospitals and Medical Services in Tasmania. In 1951, upon the retirement of the Director of Public Health both that office and his own were combined in the position of Director General of Health and he held that position at the time of his death.

== Death ==
Carruthers died at the Royal Hobart Hospital after a long illness and following a funeral service at the Memorial Congregational Church was cremated. The chief mourners were his three sisters, as his parents and brother had predeceased him.
