= Royal Derwent Hospital =

Former hospital in Tasmania, Australia

Coordinates: 42.784°S 147.075°E

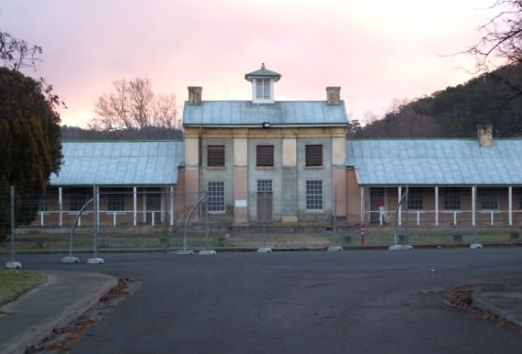

Geography
- Location: New Norfolk, Derwent Valley Council, Tasmania, Australia

Services

History
- Opened: 1827
- Closed: 2000

Links
- Lists: Hospitals in Australia

The Royal Derwent Hospital, (originally New Norfolk Insane Asylum and later Lachlan Park) was built to house mentally ill and mentally handicapped persons in 1827, soon after the separation of Van Diemens Land from New South Wales. Its name was changed on 27 March 1968 to the Royal Derwent Hospital., also absorbing the nearby Millbrook Rise facility on 1 July 1968 to house patients. It was open for more than 170 years, finally closing in November 2000.

Willow Court is a rich and complex heritage site with a diverse range of stories, reactions and opinions. These stem from the local community, the individuals hospitalised at Willow Court, their families and friends, the workers and professionals employed throughout its history

== History ==
The Royal Derwent Hospital was originally an Invalid Barracks, for invalid convicts and those considered mentally ill who had been transported to Van Diemens Land. It was expanded in 1830 by Lt-Governor Arthur, and held more than 130 invalids and mentally ill. During the 1850s it was taken over by the Colonial Government, from then on numbers of the inmates expanded rapidly, as penal institutions started to close down across the colony and their invalids were sent up to the Hospital.

The hospital was closed in late 2000, as smaller community-sited care institutes proceeded rapidly, and the hospital could no longer be funded by the Tasmanian State Government.

Today parts of the hospital site are currently sitting derelict and has been the subject of a great deal of vandalism and was badly damaged by separate arson attacks in January 2008 and December 2010 Further pieces of the site, which have been sold to private ownership, have been reopened as a tourist drawcard with a motel, two cafes, various boutique stores and two antique stores.

On the 6th of September 2018, further arson attacks caused extensive damage to Ward G. The building is expected to be demolished.

== Haunting ==
Willow Court has become notorious for supposed hauntings and ghost sightings since it shut down according to paranormal enthusiasts, so much so that in February 2011 the Derwent Valley Council agreed to a paranormal investigation. The action was criticised by the former mayor, several councilors, advocacy groups supporting previous residents, ex staff and inhabitants of New Norfolk because there were still people living who had been incarcerated in the hospital or had relatives there and it was considered to demonize previous residents and staff. There is no evidence of such haunting claims that have been verified by science, but this is keenly spoken about by believers of the paranormal.

== Personnel ==
- Dr Bruce Maitland Carruthers OBE (1892–1951), a former Director-General of Health in Tasmania was the administrator of the Lachlan Park Hospital 1935—1936.
