= Royal Hobart Hospital =

Hospital in Tasmania, Australia

- Tasmanian Health Service
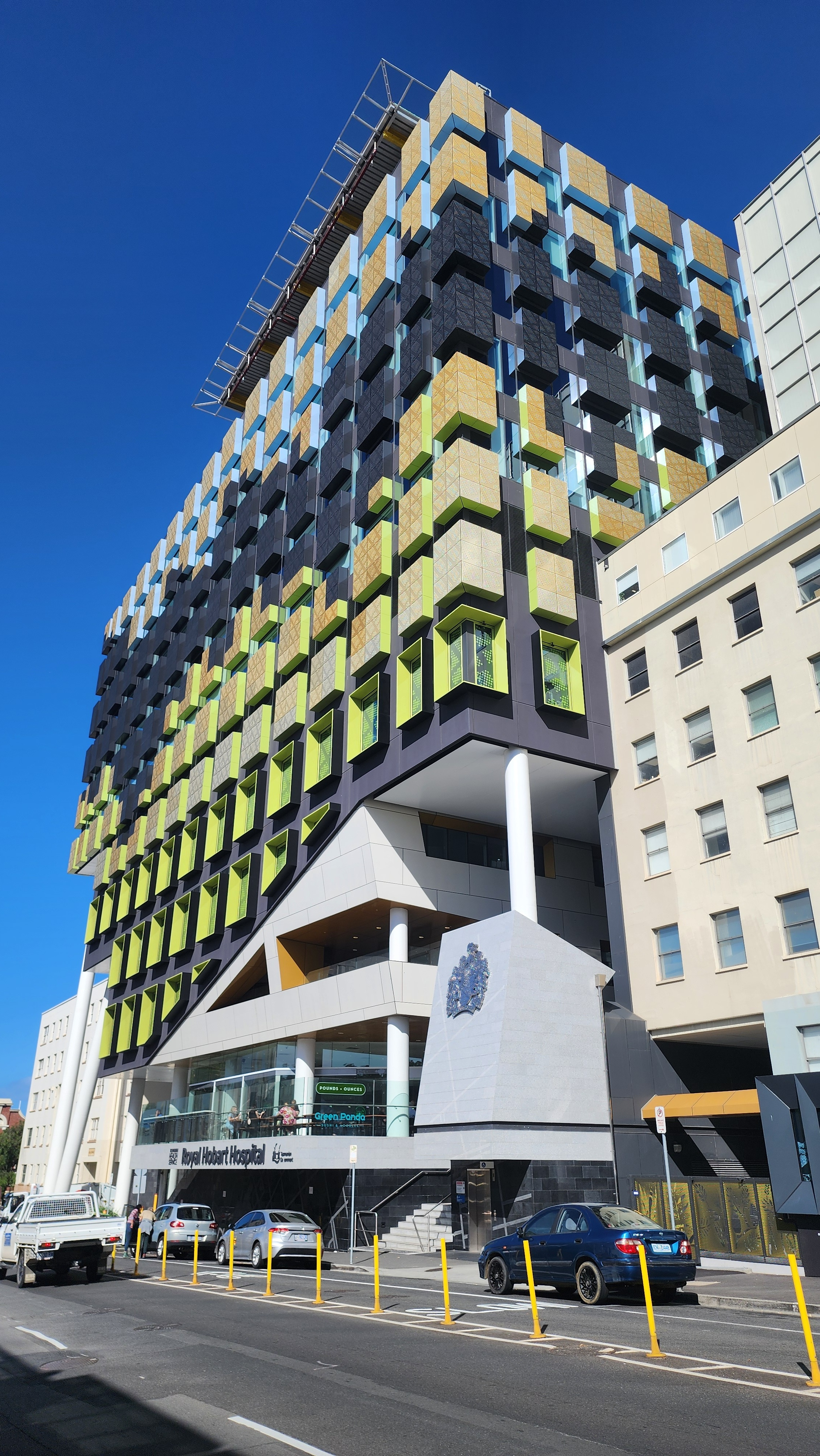

Geography
- Location: Hobart, Tasmania, Australia
- Coordinates: 42.8799°S 147.3299°E

Organisation
- Care system: Public Medicare (AU)
- Type: General
- Affiliated university: University of Tasmania

Services
- Emergency department: Yes
- Beds: 501

Helipads
- Helipad: ICAO: YXHH
| Number | Length | | Surface |
| Number | ft | m | Surface |
|---|---|---|---|
| 1 | | | aluminium |

History
- Founded: 1804

Links
- Website: Official Website
- Lists: Hospitals in Australia

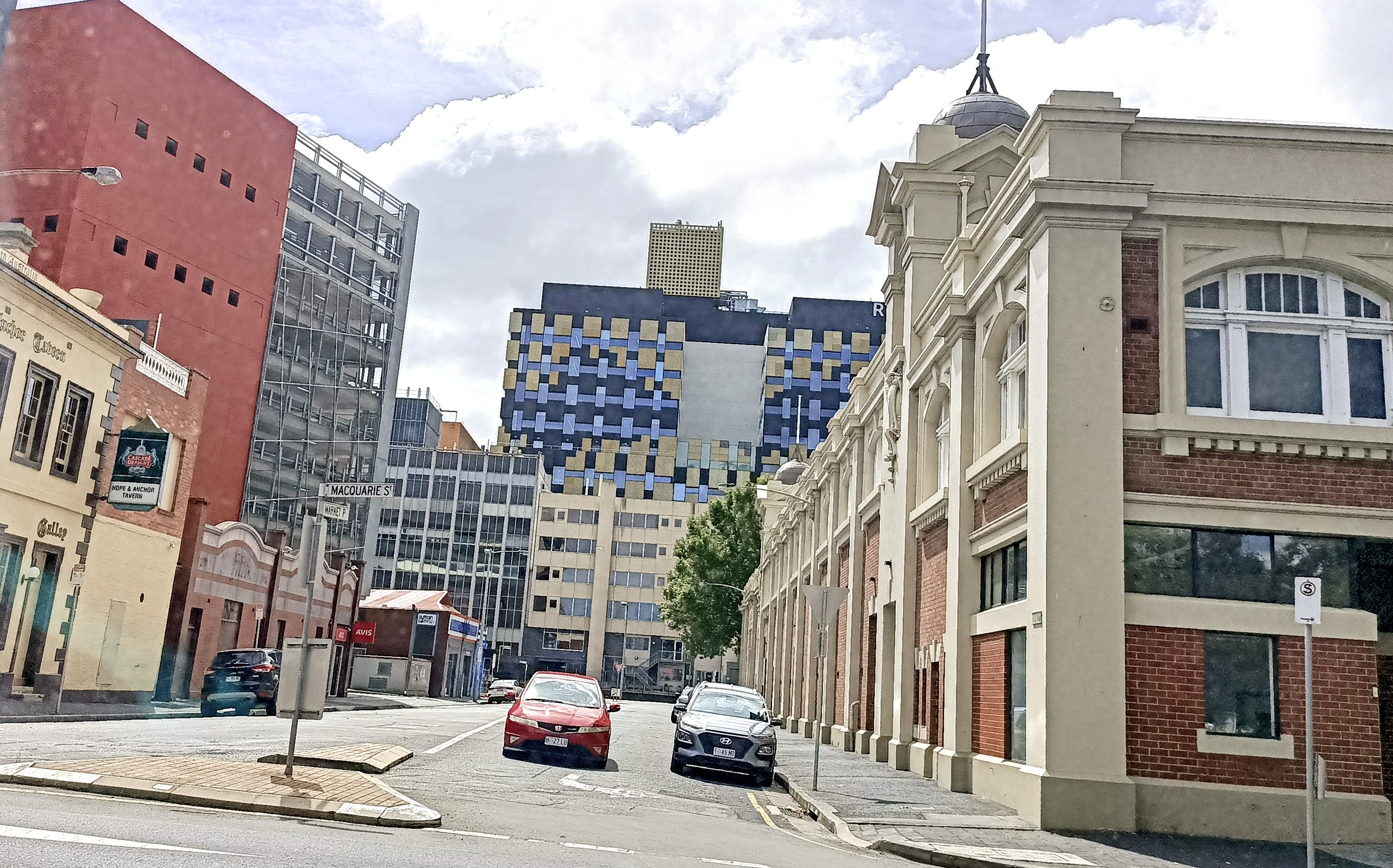
K-Block viewed from Market Place

The Royal Hobart Hospital is a public hospital in the Hobart CBD, Tasmania, Australia. The hospital also functions as a teaching hospital in co-operation with the University of Tasmania. The hospital's research facilities are known as the Royal Hobart Hospital Research Foundation.

The hospital is run by the Tasmanian Government as part of the Department of Health and is the largest hospital, and the largest employer, in Tasmania. The hospital provides services for all of southern Tasmania and has capacity for 400 patients. Many statewide services such as cardiothoracic surgery, neurosurgery, major trauma, high-risk obstetrics, hyperbaric medicine, and neonatal intensive care are based at the hospital, with referrals coming in from the north and northwest.

The main entrance underwent construction for a new underground emergency department. This began operation in early 2007 with surrounding construction ongoing. A more recent hospital redevelopment project was initiated with A$565 million in funding, including a new women's and children's precinct, cancer service, intensive care unit, and day surgery facility.

== History ==
Royal Hobart Hospital is Australia's second-oldest hospital (after Sydney Hospital) as well as the longest-running civil institution of Tasmania, and first began serving the community in 1804. It moved to its current site on Liverpool Street in 1820. In 1938 it was renamed from Hobart General Hospital to Royal Hobart Hospital and gained its own coat of arms.

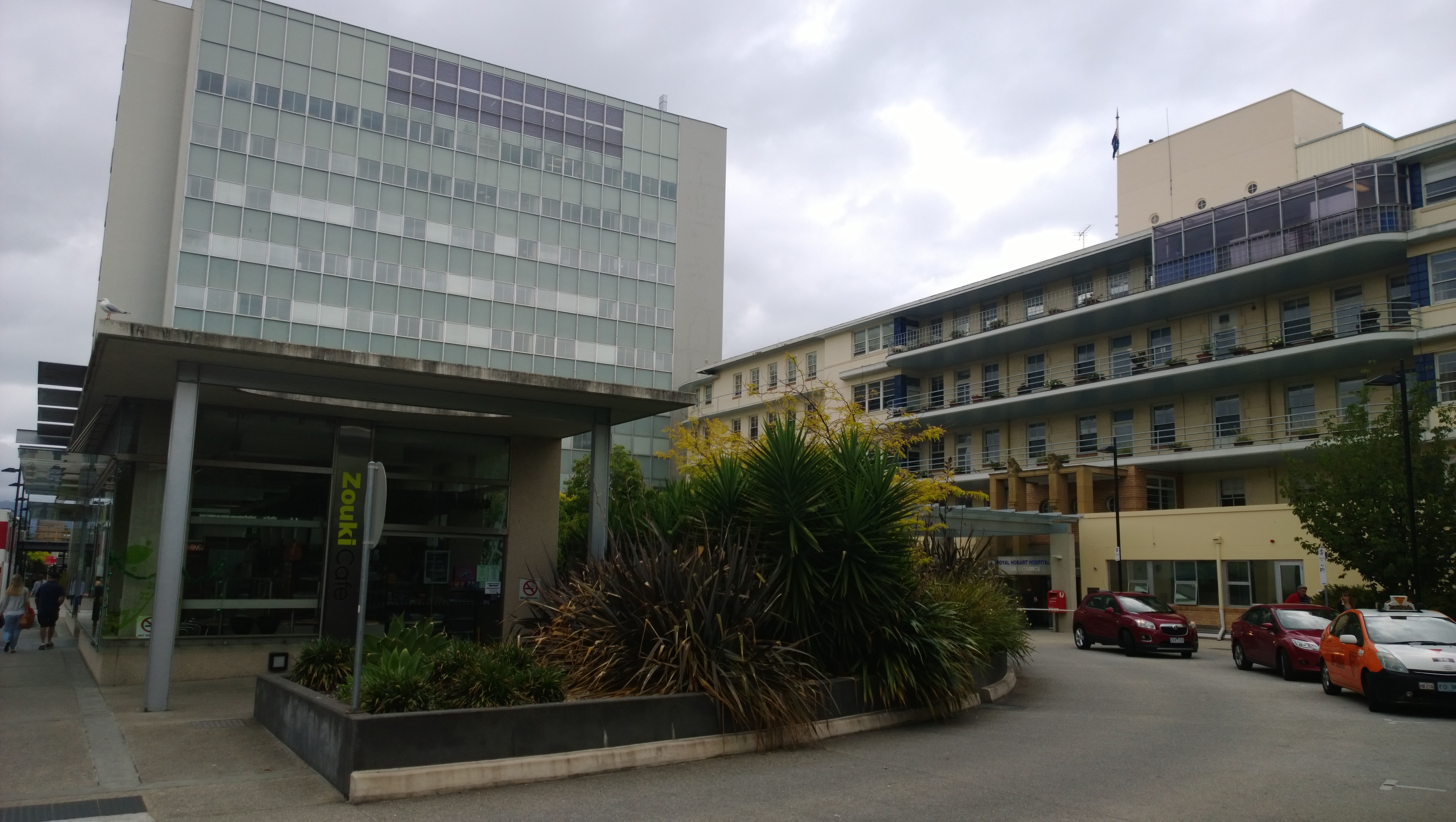
Front view

=== Repatriation General Hospital, Hobart ===
Hobart's Repatriation General Hospital was transferred to the Tasmanian public hospital system on 1 July 1992 and linked to the hospital through the Acute Care Program following the formation of the new agency. It serves as a community rehabilitation site, as well as offering allied health and inpatient geriatric services.

=== Hobart Private Hospital ===
In November 1999 the Queen Alexandra wing was leased to become the Hobart Private Hospital.

== Noteworthy personnel ==
- Dr Sir James Willson Agnew KCMG (1815-1901), appointed Colonial Surgeon at the Royal Hobart Hospital, then the Hobart general Hospital, in 1845. He went on to be the 16th Premier of Tasmania from 8 March 1886 – 29 March 1887.
- Dr Bruce Maitland Carruthers OBE (1892-1951), a former Director-General of Health in Tasmania was the senior house surgeon at Royal Hobart Hospital 1927–1935.
- Dr William Lodewyk Crowther (1817-1885), appointed as a medical officer at the hospital in 1860. He was suspended in March 1869 over charges of mutilating the body of William Lanney, the last male Tasmanian Aboriginal. He went on to be the 14th Premier of Tasmania from 20 December 1878 to 29 October 1879.

== See also ==
- List of tallest buildings in Hobart
- Repatriation General Hospital, Hobart
