= Tasmanian Government Insurance Office =

Defunct government-owned insurer in Tasmania

- Company type: State owned enterprise
- Industry: Insurance
- Founded: 16 June 1920
- Defunct: 1993
- Headquarters: Tasmania
- Area served: Australia
- Parent: Government of Tasmania

The Tasmanian Government Insurance Office was a publicly owned insurance company operated by the Government of Tasmania. It was established in 1920 to provide general insurance services within the state of Tasmania. It was sold to Fortis in 1993.

== History ==
The Tasmanian Government Insurance Office (TGIO) was established in June 2020 pursuant to the Tasmanian Government Insurance Office Act 1919.

TGIO was part of a trend in Australian states during the mid-20th century to establish government-owned insurers to offer competition to private providers and ensure access to insurance in regional areas.

== Sale and dissolution ==
In the early 1990s, as part of state government reforms and moves to reduce public debt, the Tasmanian government began reviewing the role of government business enterprises. In September 1993, the TGIO was sold to Fortis.

This move aligned Tasmania with other Australian states that were similarly privatising their state-run insurers during the 1990s.

During the 2025 state election campaign, comparisons were drawn between the TGIO and a Liberal Party policy proposal to establish a new government-owned insurer named TasInsure.
