= Federal Group =

Private family company in Tasmania, Australia

Federal Group is a family-owned Tasmanian business, and is the state's largest private employer, operating across tourism, hospitality, freight, golf, conference, retail, entertainment, hotel, technology, and gaming industries.

== History ==
=== Australia's oldest hotel group ===
Federal Group is the oldest continually operating hotel group in Australia, originating in Melbourne as Federal Coffee Palace Company Limited in June 1885 to build the city’s tallest hotel with 560 rooms and the countries largest dining room.

By the 1930s, the group, at this point now 'Federal Hotels', operated several hotels, including The Menzies, Savoy Plaza, The Windsor, Hotel Australia, Lennons Hotel in Brisbane and Hampton Court in Sydney. The postwar period marked a shift in the company’s direction, as changes in ownership and leadership coincided with a strategic move away from mainland hotel operations toward Tasmania.

=== Greg Farrell Senior ===
In January 1943, the 18-year-old Greg Farrell Snr enlisted in the Royal Australian Airforce. He was assigned to a Halifax Bomber Crew as a wireless air gunner. Greg Farrell Snr completed his service and returned to Australia following the end of hostilities. After the war, Farrell turned to the transport industry. He took over the Interstate Parcel Express Company (IPEC) transport group with his university friend Gordon Barton, building it into a household name in Australia’s freight sector. Greg Farrell Snr’s long career in transport culminated with IPEC becoming one of the nation’s leading courier and logistics companies prior to its eventual acquisition by the Toll Group. During the 1940’s, before he entered the hotel industry, he and his wife Delores honeymooned at the Wrest Point Riviera Hotel, to which he Farrell declared it “the greatest hotel site in the world”.

=== Australia’s first casino - Wrest Point ===
In the late 1960s, Federal Hotels, under the leadership of Greg Farrell Snr, pursued the development of a casino at the Wrest Point Riviera Hotel as a means of stimulating Tasmania’s tourism industry and reducing its seasonal dependence. The proposal was advanced in consultation with the Tasmanian Government and became the subject of significant public and parliamentary debate.

On 14 December 1968, a statewide referendum was held asking voters whether they supported the granting of a casino licence to Wrest Point, conditional on the proposed redevelopment of the hotel. The proposal was approved by with 56% support, and the Wrest Point Casino Licence and Development Act 1968 was subsequently passed by the Tasmanian Parliament.

Construction of the new casino complex commenced in October 1970. On 10 February 1973, the Wrest Point Hotel Casino officially opened, becoming Australia’s first legal casino. The opening was marked by a nationally televised gala event, featuring fireworks and entertainment headlined by American entertainer Jerry Lewis.

In 1984, Federal Group constructed Australia’s first purpose-built convention and entertainment complex on site at a cost of over $20 million, called Wrest Point Convention Centre. By 1989 the Farrell family had also gained majority ownership of Federal Hotels’ holding company and proceeded to privatise the Federal Group in 1990, allowing them to concentrate completely on investing in Tasmania’s tourism industry and adopt a longer term investment strategy not linked to shareholder and performance cycles.

Wrest Point hotel remains the tallest building in Tasmania, and is now legally a heritage building as decided by the Heritage Council of Tasmania.

==== Heritage listing ====
In August 2017, Wrest Point was added to the Tasmanian Heritage Register on the basis of its historical, social, and architectural significance, rather than age alone. The Tasmanian Heritage Council assessed Wrest Point as significant because it was Australia’s first legal casino, opened in February 1973, and because of its role in the development of Tasmania’s post-war tourism and hospitality industry. while the Heritage Council’s decision was based on formal heritage criteria, the listing generated mixed public responses, highlighting broader debate about how “heritage” is defined, particularly in relation to modernist architecture and twentieth-century commercial buildings.

==== 50th anniversary redevelopment ====
Between 2018 and 2023, Federal Group undertook a staged redevelopment program at Wrest Point Hotel Casino, completing a renovation project reported to total approximately AUD $65 million to coincide with the property’s 50th anniversary. The redevelopment was implemented progressively across multiple years. In 2018, works included refurbishment of the Point Revolving Restaurant, followed in 2019 by upgrades to tower accommodation and the Boardwalk area. In 2021, renovations extended to the casino facilities, including reconfiguration of the gaming floor and upgrades to associated amenities. Further works undertaken in 2022 included the introduction of new food and beverage venues such as the Longhorn Smokehouse, expansion of the Birdcage Bar, redevelopment of the main reception area, and the establishment of a dedicated lounge for Forte members. The redevelopment program concluded in 2023 with refurbishment of Water Edge and Motor Inn accommodation, upgrades to tower floors one to five, and renewal of mezzanine and corridor areas, completing the multi-stage renewal of Tasmania’s tallest hotel building.

=== Country Club Casino ===
In 1982, Federal Group opened the Country Club Casino and Resort. Architects modelled the style and interior design of Country Club on the stately homes of America’s south. Greg Farrell senior had always admired the simple lines of the US Embassy building in Canberra and believed that the Georgian style would work well in the rural landscape of Launceston.

==== Redevelopment ====
In mid-2023, Federal Group commenced a redevelopment program at Country Club Tasmania, including a project reported to involve approximately AUD $14 million to redesign and upgrade the existing golf course to championship standard. The new 18-hole course was designed by golf course architect Beau Welling, with construction involving a full reconfiguration of the course layout and playing surfaces.

In parallel with the championship course redevelopment, Federal Group also commenced construction of additional golf and leisure infrastructure at the site, including a state-of-the-art mini-golf facility and a multi-storey driving range intended to expand the precinct’s recreational offerings.

Associated with the broader redevelopment, Federal Group initiated the staged release of up to 372 residential lots as part of the planned Country Club Estate, intended to be delivered progressively over several years adjacent to the resort and golf facilities. In late 2025, Federal Group completed the multi-storey driving range, known as The Range.

=== COPE Sensitive Freight ===
In April 1989, Federal Group founded COPE Sensitive Freight; a carrier for fragile, high-value equipment/items. COPE started with purpose-built vehicles and grew into what is now Australia’s largest independent sensitive-freight company with depots in every capital city, reflecting the Farrel family’s continued involvement in transport and logistics.

=== Pure Tasmania ===
In the mid-1990s, Pure Tasmania was established by Federal Group as a privately initiated branding and advocacy concept that articulated Tasmania’s identity around environmental purity, authenticity, and premium place-based experience. Through its application in hospitality development, tourism promotion, and business/marketing communications, the concept is attributed to reframing of Tasmania as a distinctive, high-value destination within domestic and international tourism markets. Elements of this framing were later reflected in, though not formally adopted as, government-led destination branding that underpins Tasmania’s contemporary tourism identity.

=== Network Gaming ===
In 1996, Network Gaming was set up to manage the distribution of gaming machines and Keno in hotels and clubs throughout Tasmania, operating under the OASIS Gaming and TASkeno banners.

=== Vantage Group ===
In 1999, Federal Group established Vantage Hotel Group to operate freehold hotels purchased by Federal Group. Initially starting with 3 hotels in 1999, this number grew to 12 by 2015.

=== Regional tourism investment ===
In the early 2000s, Federal Group operated a number of tourism assets across Tasmania as part of an expansion of its tourism portfolio. These included Strahan Village, Gordon River Cruises, and the West Coast Wilderness Railway in 2002, followed by Freycinet Lodge and Cradle Mountain Chateau in 2004. In 2014, Federal Group sold several regional tourism businesses to RACT, including Strahan Village, Gordon River Cruises, Freycinet Lodge, and Cradle Mountain Chateau.

=== 9/11 Bottleshop ===
In 2006, Federal Group purchased the 9/11 retail liquor business, establishing a foothold in the retail liquor market. The 9/11 brand was incorporated into Vantage Hotel Group’s operations, increasing their scope of operation to eventually 20 9/11 stores and 12 hotels. In 2024, Coles Liquor reached an agreement to acquire all 20 of Federal Group's 9/11 stores.

=== Henry Jones Art Hotel ===
In 2007, Federal Group established the now internationally acclaimed Henry Jones Art Hotel in Hobart. This boutique hotel is regarded for its integration of contemporary art within a historical setting, enhancing Federal Group's luxury accommodation offerings. Within the Henry Jones Precinct, Federal Group also provides high-end experiences through Landscape (restaurant), Peacock and Jones (restaurant), The IXL Long Bar, and Jam Packed Café.

=== Saffire Freycinet Resort ===
In 2010, Federal Group expanded its accommodation portfolio with the opening of Saffire Freycinet, a purpose-built resort at Coles Bay on Tasmania’s east coast. The development occurred during a period in which Tasmanian tourism policy and industry strategy increasingly emphasised diversification toward higher-value, experience-based travel, particularly in regional and nature-focused destinations. Reporting described the project as a significant private investment in Tasmania’s visitor economy, with development costs reported at approximately $30–32 million.

Industry and travel media coverage at the time characterised Saffire Freycinet as part of a broader national trend toward small-scale, high-end lodge accommodation, noting its limited number of suites, emphasis on personalised service, and integration with the surrounding natural environment. Reporting surrounding the opening also highlighted the resort’s contribution to regional employment and its role in positioning Tasmania within Australia’s emerging premium lodge market during the late 2000s and early 2010s.

Since opening Saffire has consistently won state, national, and international award. Some in include: Gold for Luxury Accommodation at the Tasmanian Tourism Awards and Best New Tourism Development at the Qantas Australian Tourism Awards. Saffire Freycinet has subsequently appeared in the Condé Nast Traveler Readers’ Choice Awards, ranking among leading resorts in Australasia and the South Pacific. The property has also received multiple TripAdvisor Travellers’ Choice and Best of the Best awards, including recognition as Best Luxury Hotel in Australia, Best Luxury Hotel in the South Pacific, and placement among top luxury hotels globally in selected years. More recently, Saffire Freycinet has been recognised within the MICHELIN Guide hotel assessment framework through the award of MICHELIN Keys.

=== MACq 01 ===
In June 2017, Federal Group opened MACq 01 on Hobart’s Hunter Street waterfront following a redevelopment reported to have cost approximately AUD $77 million. The hotel was constructed on the site of former Hunter Street wharf sheds, with the architectural design retaining and adapting elements of the original working wharf structures, including recycled timbers and industrial forms, as part of a broader waterfront regeneration project. MACq 01 was developed as a themed accommodation property organised around narratives drawn from Tasmanian history, with each guest room associated with a specific historical figure or story, and was described at the time of opening as Australia’s first storytelling hotel. The precinct incorporates hotel-operated food and beverage venues located within the former wharf buildings.

=== Changes to gaming licenses ===
In August 2017, it was decided that there would no longer be a single gaming license holder in Tasmania; pubs and clubs were authorised to hold their own license, and Federal Group no longer has a monopoly of poker machines.

=== Odyssey ===
In December 2017, Federal Group acquired Odyssey Gaming Services, a Licensed Monitoring Operator (LMO) that has provided electronic gaming machine monitoring and related services to the Queensland club and hotel industry since 1998.

== Tasmanian License Model ==
Federal Group’s gaming operations until 2017 operated under a Tasmanian regulatory framework that granted the company an exclusive licence to operate electronic gaming machines (poker machines) outside casinos. The licensing regime was established under the Gaming Control Act 1993, the object of which is to provide for the “licensing, supervision and control of … gaming machines” and to ensure that gambling is conducted “in a fair, honest and transparent way and is free from criminal influence.” Parliamentary reporting on the licence arrangements described them as operating within a “stable and regulated framework,” subject to agreed “probity, regulatory performance and compliance requirements.”

In 2017, local author James Boyce argued that the exclusive license structure delivered disproportionate financial returns to the operator and raised concerns about alignment with broader public interest outcomes.

In August 2017, Tasmanian Government confirmed that poker machine licences would no longer be held exclusively by a single operator from 2018 following Federal Group's decision to relinquish.

In 2019, the Tasmanian Government released the Gambling Support Program Strategic Framework. Upon releasing the Framework, the Government stated that while many Tasmanians participate in gambling as a form of entertainment, it “recognise[s] that gambling causes harm for some people,” and adopts a “public health approach to reducing gambling harm” that addresses impacts on individuals, families and communities. The framework describes gambling regulation in Tasmania as operating through a combination of statutory controls under the Gaming Control Act 1993 and broader harm-minimisation measures, including mandatory responsible gambling requirements, independent regulation by the Tasmanian Liquor and Gaming Commission. The framework also confirmed the ongoing use of periodic independent reviews, including the Social and Economic Impact Study of Gambling in Tasmania (SEIS).

In 2021, The Social and Economic Impact Study of Gambling in Tasmania (Fifth Edition), conducted independently by the South Australian Centre for Economic Studies at the University of Adelaide and funded by the Tasmanian Government, reported that “gambling in Tasmania delivers benefits of between $123.3 million and $207.8 million,” with “offsetting impacts or social costs … estimated to be in the range of $48.9 million to $159.6 million.” The study concluded that “as the most plausible range is positive, it is highly likely that gambling delivers a net benefit for the Tasmanian community,” while noting significant uncertainty in the estimates.

Further, The Social and Economic Impact Study of Gambling in Tasmania (Fifth Edition) reported that the Tasmanian Government “collects less by way of revenue from taxes on gambling activities – both per head of population and as a proportion of gross state product – than any other jurisdiction,” and noted this was “consistent with Tasmanians spending less per head, and as a proportion of their incomes, on gambling activities.”
