= Trafalgar Building, Hobart =

Building in Collins Street, Hobart, Tasmania

Trafalgar Building
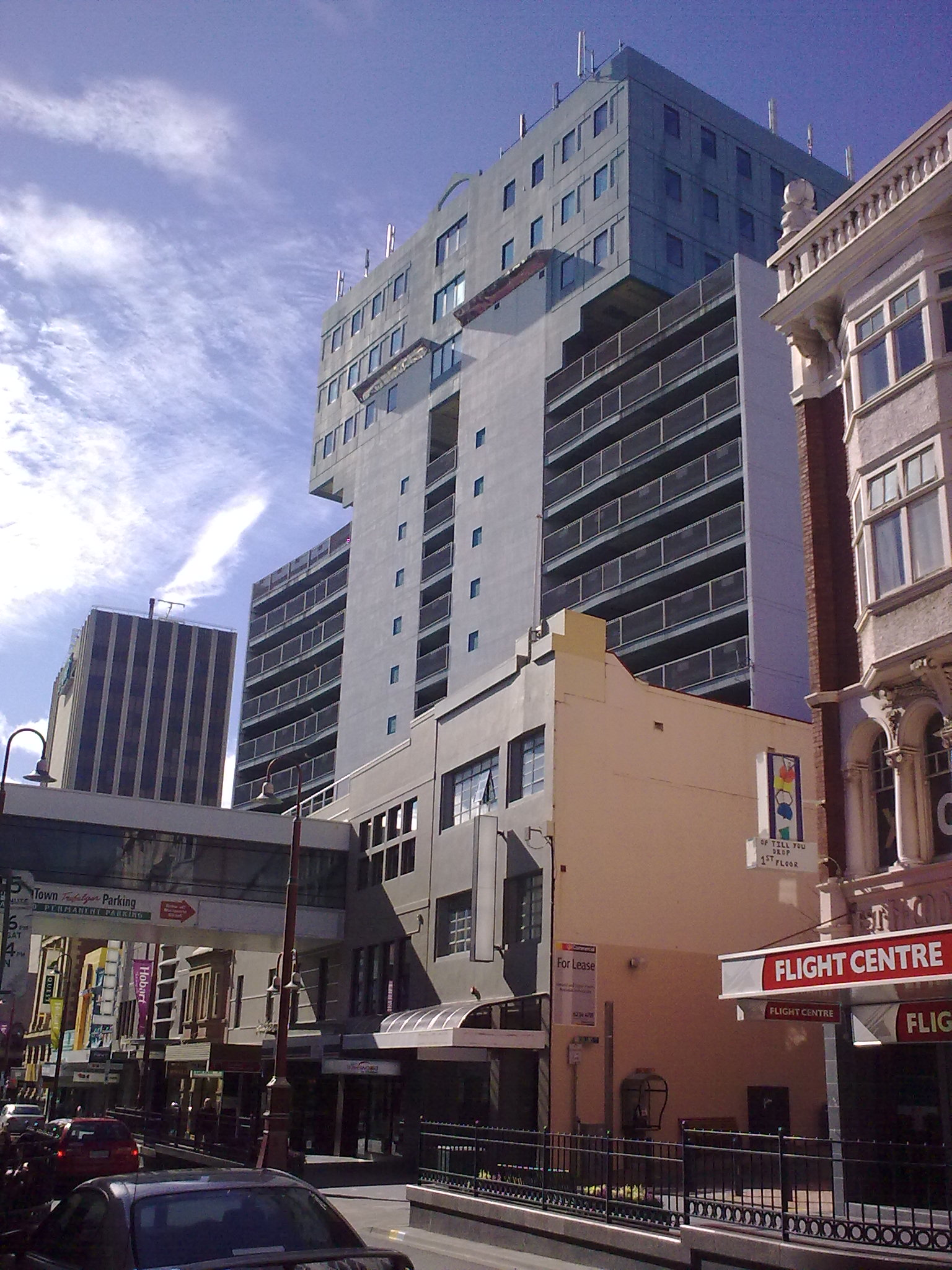
- Trafalgar Building from Collins Street
- Interactive map of the Trafalgar Building area

General information
- Type: Multi-use
- Location: 108-110 Collins Street, Hobart
- Coordinates: 42.88276°S 147.32860°E
- Completed: 1987
- Opening: 1987

Height
- Roof: 50 m (160 ft)

Technical details
- Floor count: 15

The Trafalgar Building is a multi-use building at 108-110 Collins Street in the CBD of Hobart, Tasmania, Australia. It has fifteen stories and is 50 metres tall.

Usage of the building includes general commercial for the first two floors, car parking for levels three to twelve, and corporate offices on floors thirteen through to fifteen.

Current corporate tenants are Tasmanian Ports Corporation Pty Ltd (level 13), The Department of Justice (level 14), and RXP (level 15).

== See also ==
- List of tallest buildings in Hobart
