= Wrest Point Hotel Casino =

Hotel and casino complex in Hobart, Tasmania

- Wrest Point Casino logo

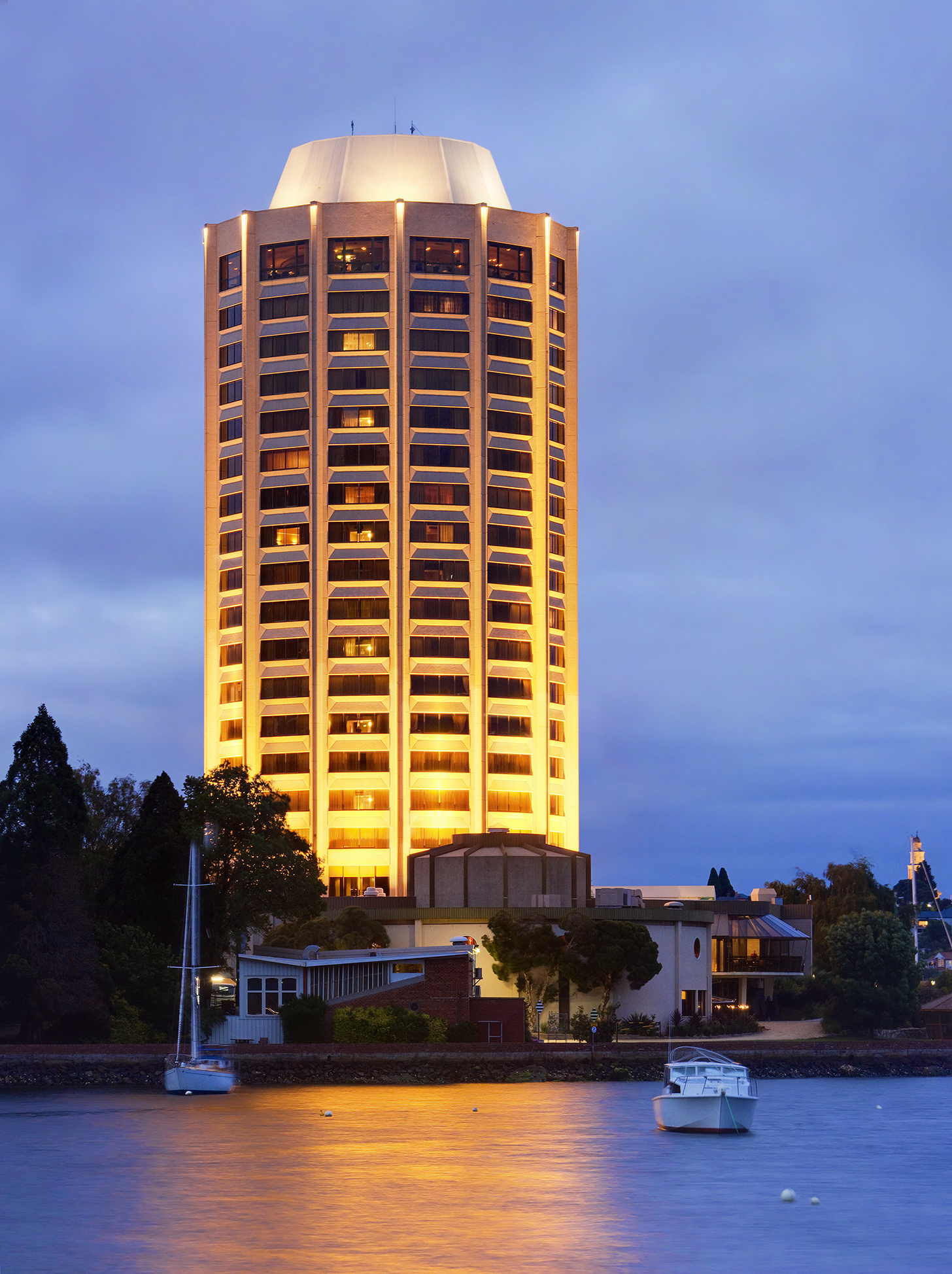
- Wrest Point Hotel Casino at night
- Interactive map of Wrest Point Hotel Casino
- Location: Hobart, Tasmania, Australia; 42°54′7″S 147°20′17″E
- Opened: 10 February 1973; 53 years ago
- No. of rooms: 269
- Notable restaurants: 5 + 6 bars
- Casino type: Resort
- Owner: Federal Hotels
- Operating license holder: Federal Group
- Architect: Colin Philp (1939); D. Hartley Wilson (1939); Roy Grounds (1973)
- Website: Official Site

Tasmanian Heritage Register
- Place ID: 7,496
- Status: Permanently Registered

The Wrest Point Hotel Casino is a casino in Tasmania. It is Australia's first legal casino, opening in the suburb of Sandy Bay in Hobart, on 10 February 1973. The hotel tower is the tallest building in Hobart as well as Tasmania.

== History ==
Historically, Dunkley's Point was a camping ground held by the semi-nomadic Mouheneener people, who held a permanent settlement at nearby Long Beach called kreewer. Norfolk Islander Thomas Chaffey constructed his residence on the point between 1808 and 1813, during the British colonisation of Tasmania, which became known as Chaffey's Point by the end of his life. The Traveller's Wrest Hotel, which is still standing today on Sandy Bay Road, was erected by his son William Chaffey in 1836. David Dunkley purchased the Chaffey's Point estate from William Chaffey in 1847. He constructed his residence, St. Helena and renamed the area Dunkley's Point. George G. Robertson purchased St. Helena in 1898 and rebuilt it, adding a jetty and a boat house. Mrs. G. Minette Lucas purchased the estate in 1928 and erected her mansion, known as Wrest Point. The estate was purchased by entrepreneur Arthur James Drysdale in 1936.

=== Wrest Point Riviera Hotel ===
Designed by architects Colin Philp and David Hartley Wilson, the streamline moderne Wrest Point Riviera Hotel was considered "one of the most modern establishments of its kind in Australia" upon opening on 5 December 1939. 400 guests attended the opening, including Tasmanian Premier Edmund Dwyer-Gray.

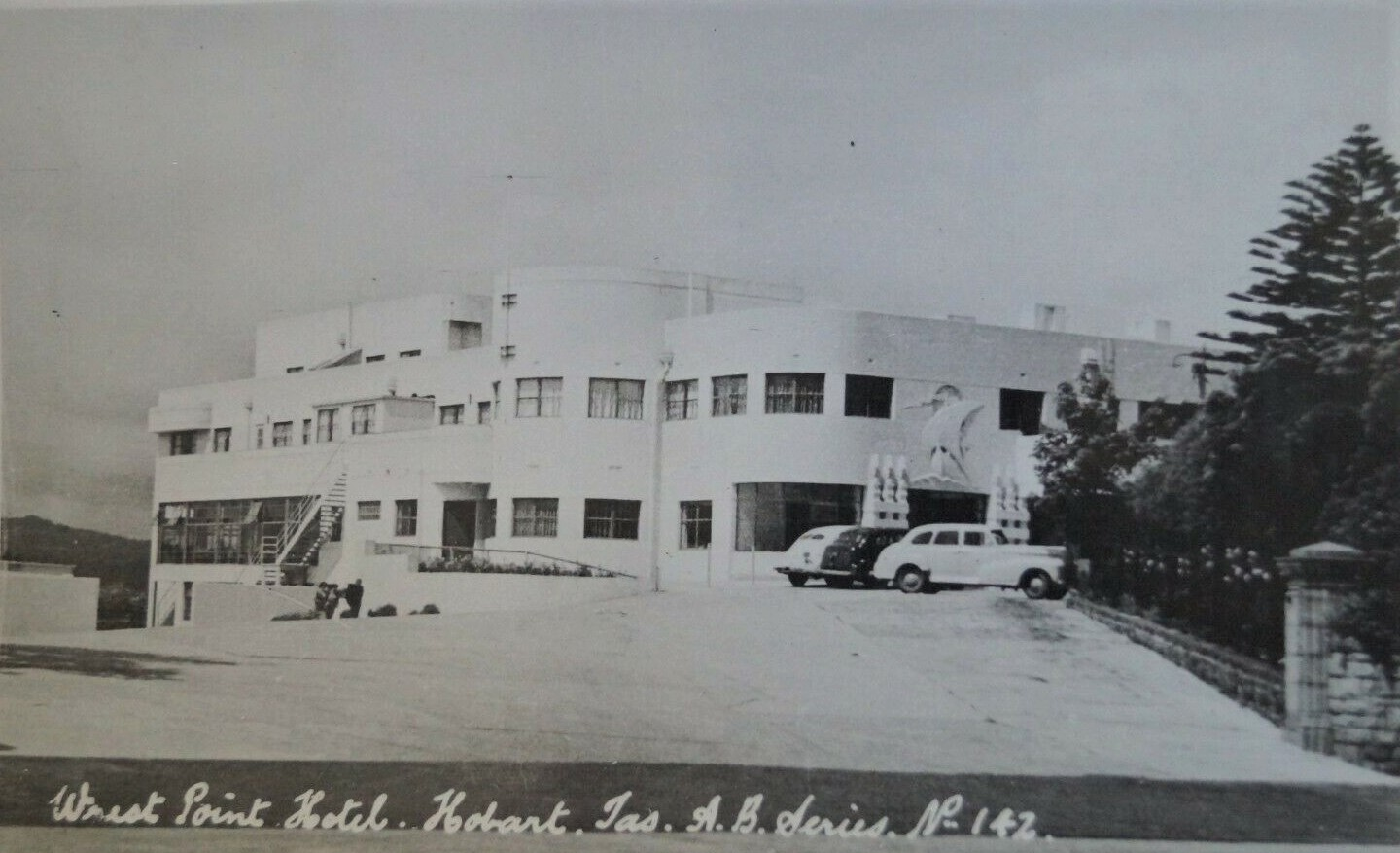
Wrest Point Riviera Hotel, 1940s

Built at a cost exceeding £A7,300, the luxurious hotel accommodated 500 patrons. The entirety of Dunkley's Point was also redeveloped, featuring tiered garden beds, a heated saltwater bathing pool, tennis court and a private jetty with a steamboat named Arcadia offering scenic cruises and a yacht named Acushla. Both the pool and tennis courts were walled as a means to protect patrons from undesirably strong winds.

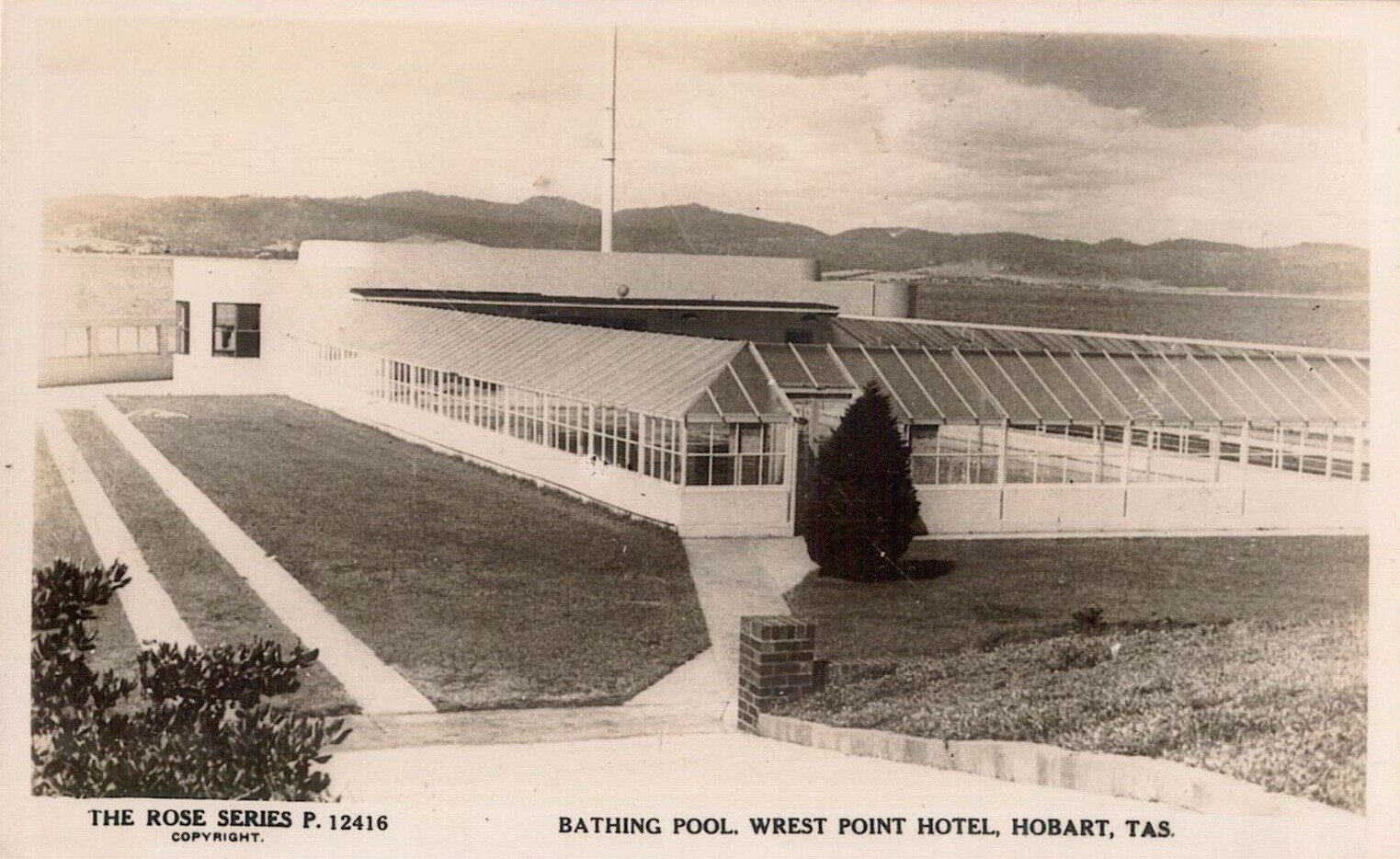
Bathing pool, circa 1940s

During World War II the hotel was "booming" and the hotel was sold to Australia's oldest hotel group, Federal Hotels, in March 1956.

=== Granting of the casino licence ===
On 14 December 1968, a statewide referendum was held asking voters whether they supported the granting of a casino licence to Wrest Point, conditional on the proposed redevelopment of the hotel. The proposal was approved by with 56% support, and the Wrest Point Casino Licence and Development Act 1968 was subsequently passed by the Tasmanian Parliament.

=== Development ===
The development of the casino included the construction of the 17-storey hotel tower, with a revolving restaurant, designed by Sir Roy Grounds, a landmark that is nationally identified with Hobart, and the 64-metre (210 feet) dodecagonal prism tower remains the city's tallest building.

In 1984, Federal Group constructed Australia's first purpose-built convention and entertainment complex on site at a cost of over $20 million, called Wrest Point Convention Centre. Later, in 1996, the construction of the boardwalk was completed.

==== 50th Anniversary redevelopment ====
Between 2018 and 2023, Federal Group undertook a staged redevelopment program at Wrest Point Hotel Casino, completing a renovation project reported to total approximately AUD $65 million to coincide with the property's 50th anniversary. The redevelopment was implemented progressively across multiple years. In 2018, works included refurbishment of the Point Revolving Restaurant, followed in 2019 by upgrades to tower accommodation and the Boardwalk area. In 2021, renovations extended to the casino facilities, including reconfiguration of the gaming floor and upgrades to associated amenities. Further works undertaken in 2022 included the introduction of new food and beverage venues such as the Longhorn Smokehouse, expansion of the Birdcage Bar, redevelopment of the main reception area, and the establishment of a dedicated lounge for Forte members. The redevelopment program concluded in 2023 with refurbishment of Water Edge and Motor Inn accommodation, upgrades to tower floors one to five, and renewal of mezzanine and corridor areas, completing the multi-stage renewal of Tasmania's tallest hotel building.

=== Heritage listing ===
Wrest Point Hotel Casino was added to the Tasmanian Heritage Register on the basis of its historical, social, and architectural significance, rather than age alone. The Tasmanian Heritage Council assessed Wrest Point as significant because it was Australia's first legal casino, opened in February 1973, and because of its role in the development of Tasmania's post-war tourism and hospitality industry. while the Heritage Council's decision was based on formal heritage criteria, the listing generated mixed public responses, highlighting broader debate about how "heritage" is defined, particularly in relation to modernist architecture and twentieth-century commercial buildings.

== See also ==
- 1968 Tasmanian casino referendum
- Federal Group
- List of tallest buildings in Hobart

== Sources ==
- "Wrest Point Hotel Casino: Tasmanian Heritage Register Datasheet (THR ID 7496)". Department of Natural Resources and Environment Tasmania. heritage.tas.gov.au. Heritage Tasmania. 23 March 2026. Archived from the original on 21 October 2026.
