= List of birds of Western Australia =

This is a list of the wild birds found in Western Australia. The list includes introduced species, common vagrants, recently extinct species, extirpated species, some very rare vagrants (seen once) and species only present in captivity. 629 species are listed.

The taxonomy is based on Christidis and Boles, 2008. Their system has been developed over nearly two decades and has strong local support, but deviates in important ways from more generally accepted schemes.

This list's taxonomic treatment (designation and sequence of orders, families and species) and nomenclature (common and scientific names) follow the conventions of The Clements Checklist of Birds of the World, 2022 edition. All of the birds below are included in the total bird count for Western Australia.

The following tags have been used to highlight several categories. The commonly occurring native species do not fall into any of these categories.

- (A) Accidental – a species that rarely or accidentally occurs in Western Australia
- (E) Endemic – a species endemic to Western Australia
- (I) Introduced – a species introduced to Western Australia as a consequence, direct or indirect, of human actions
- (Ex) Extirpated – a species that no longer occurs in Western Australia although populations exist elsewhere
- (X) Extinct – a species or subspecies that no longer exists.

== Ostriches ==
Order: Struthioniformes Family: Struthionidae

This order is not native to Western Australia, but feral populations of one species have become established.

| Common name | Binomial | Notes |
|---|---|---|
| Common ostrich | Struthio camelus | (I) |

== Cassowaries and emu ==
Order: Casuariiformes Family: Dromaiidae

This family of flightless ratite birds is represented by two living species in Australia. Another two species are found in New Guinea. The extinct, geographically isolated King and Kangaroo Island emus were historically considered to be separate species to mainland emus. However, genetic evidence from 2011 suggests that all three are conspecific.

| Common name | Binomial | Notes |
|---|---|---|
| Emu | Dromaius novaehollandiae | |

== Magpie goose ==
Order: Anseriformes Family: Anseranatidae

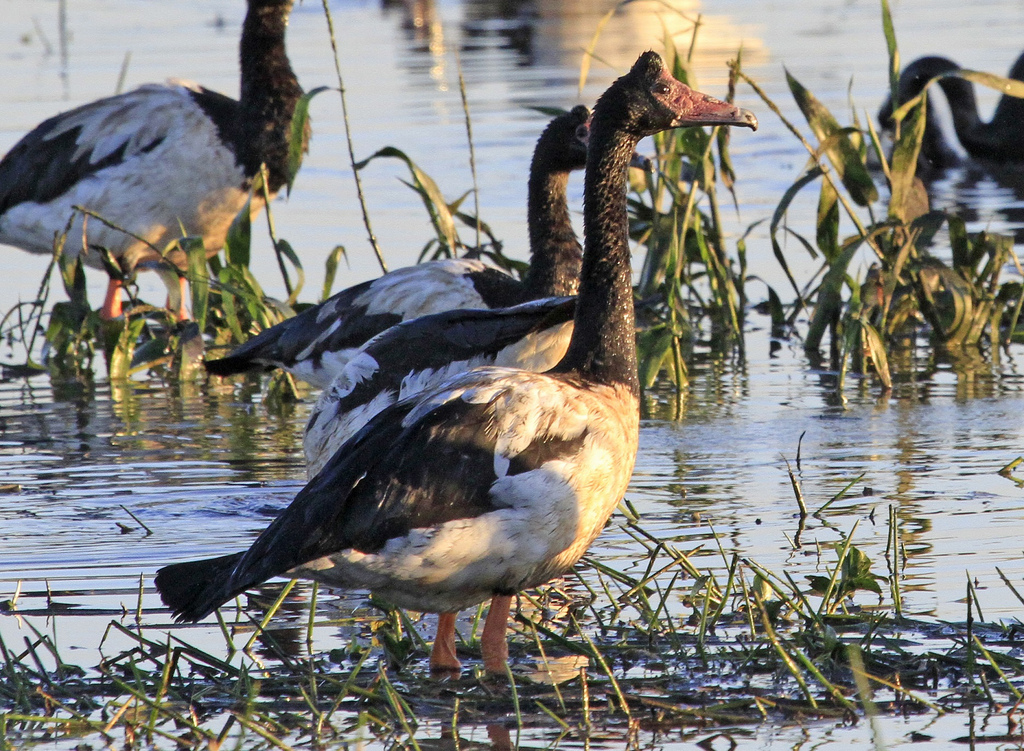
Magpie goose

The family contains a single species, the magpie goose. It was an early and distinctive offshoot of the anseriform family tree, diverging after the screamers and before all other ducks, geese and swans, sometime in the late Cretaceous. The single species is found across Australia.

| Common name | Binomial | Notes |
|---|---|---|
| Magpie goose | Anseranas semipalmata | |

== Ducks, geese, and waterfowl ==
Order: Anseriformes Family: Anatidae

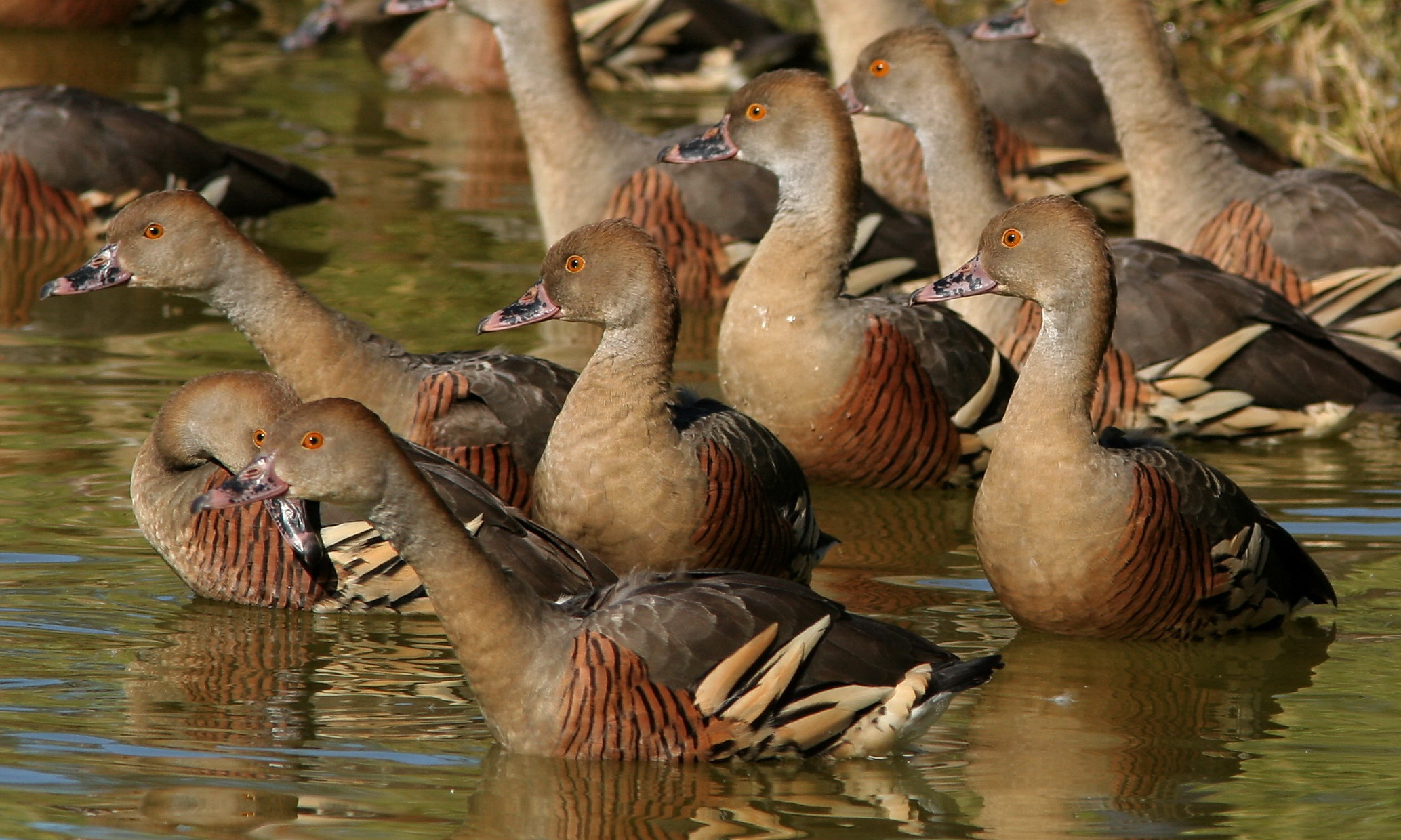
Plumed whistling ducks

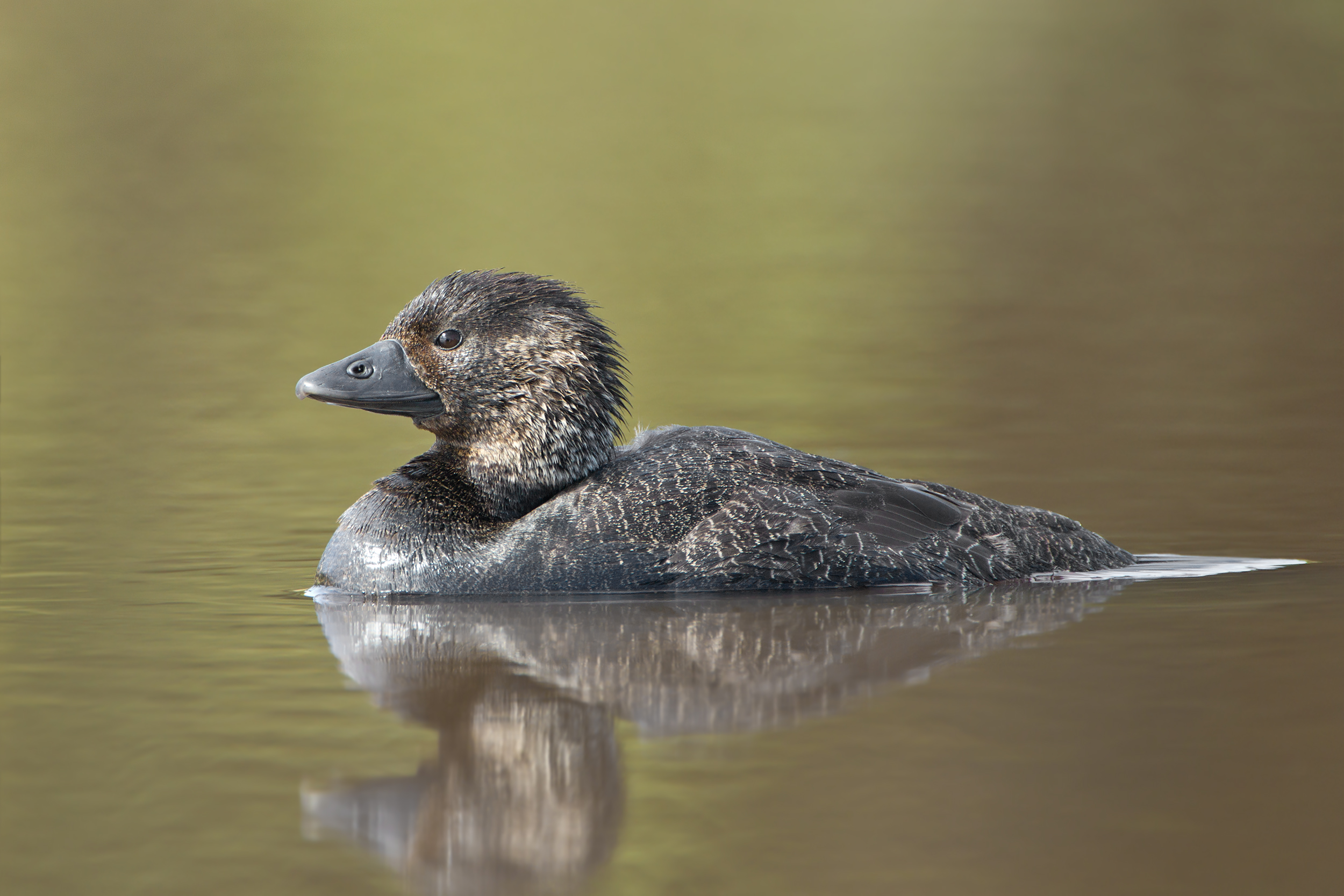
Musk duck

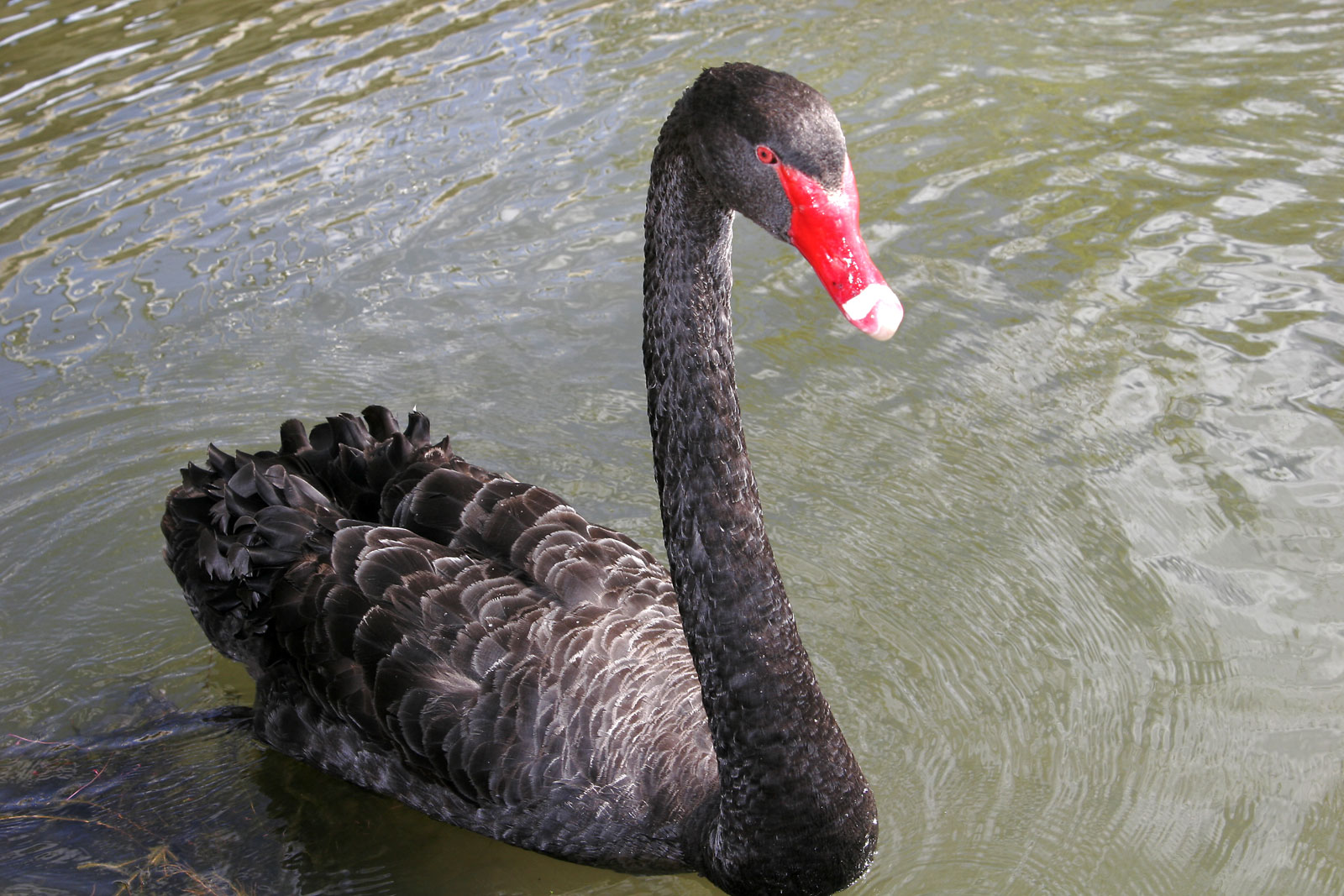
Black swan

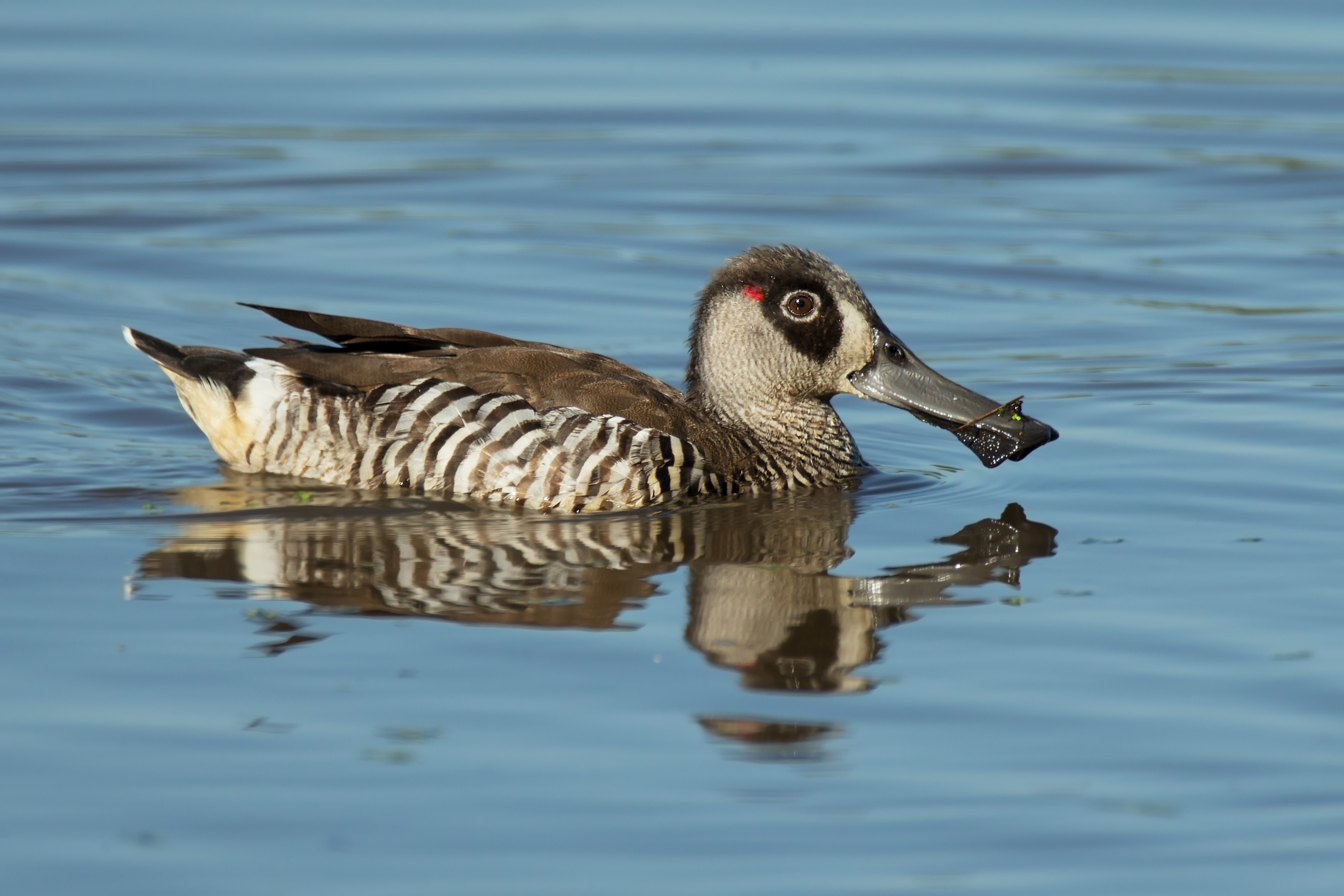
Pink-eared duck

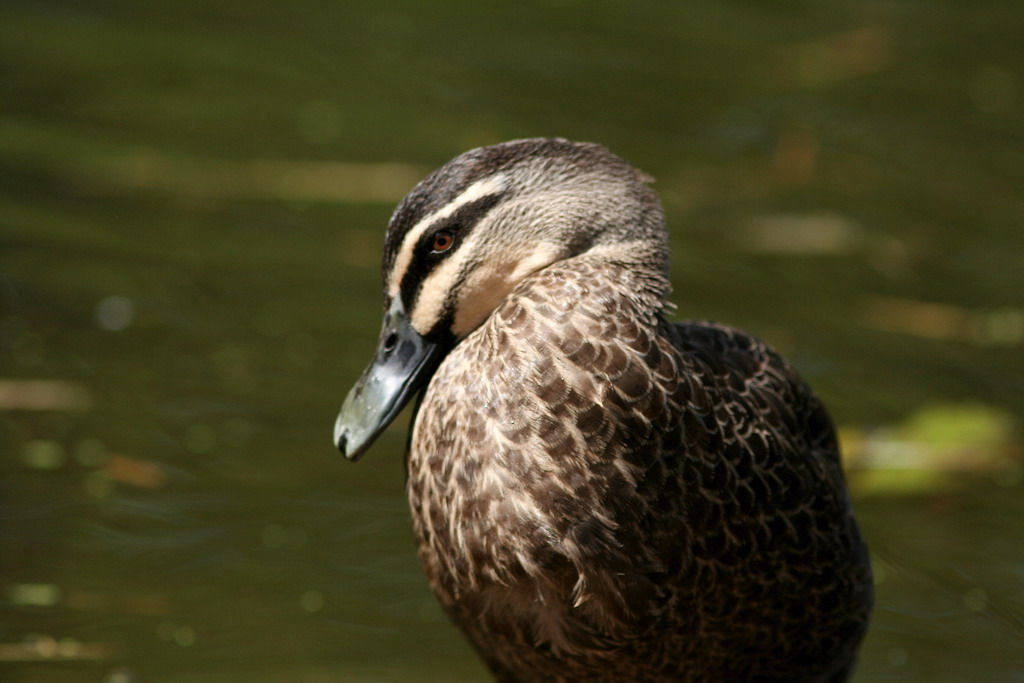
Pacific black duck

The family Anatidae includes the ducks and most duck-like waterfowl, such as geese and swans. These are adapted for an aquatic existence, with webbed feet, bills that are flattened to a greater or lesser extent, and feathers that are excellent at shedding water due to special oils.

| Common name | Binomial | Notes |
|---|---|---|
| Plumed whistling-duck | Dendrocygna eytoni | |
| Wandering whistling-duck | Dendrocygna arcuata | |
| Cape Barren goose | Cereopsis novaehollandiae | |
| Freckled duck | Stictonetta naevosa | |
| Mute swan | Cygnus olor | (I) |
| Black swan | Cygnus atratus | |
| Radjah shelduck | Radjah radjah | |
| Australian shelduck | Tadorna tadornoides | |
| Green pygmy-goose | Nettapus pulchellus | |
| Australian wood duck | Chenonetta jubata | |
| Garganey | Spatula querquedula | (A) |
| Australasian shoveler | Spatula rhynchotis | |
| Northern shoveler | Spatula clypeata | (A) |
| Eurasian wigeon | Mareca penelope | (A) |
| Pacific black duck | Anas superciliosa | |
| Mallard | Anas platyrhynchos | (I) |
| Northern pintail | Anas acuta | (A) |
| Gray teal | Anas gracilis | |
| Chestnut teal | Anas castanea | |
| Pink-eared duck | Malacorhynchus membranaceus | |
| Hardhead | Aythya australis | |
| Blue-billed duck | Oxyura australis | |
| Musk duck | Biziura lobata | |

== Megapodes ==
Order: Galliformes Family: Megapodiidae

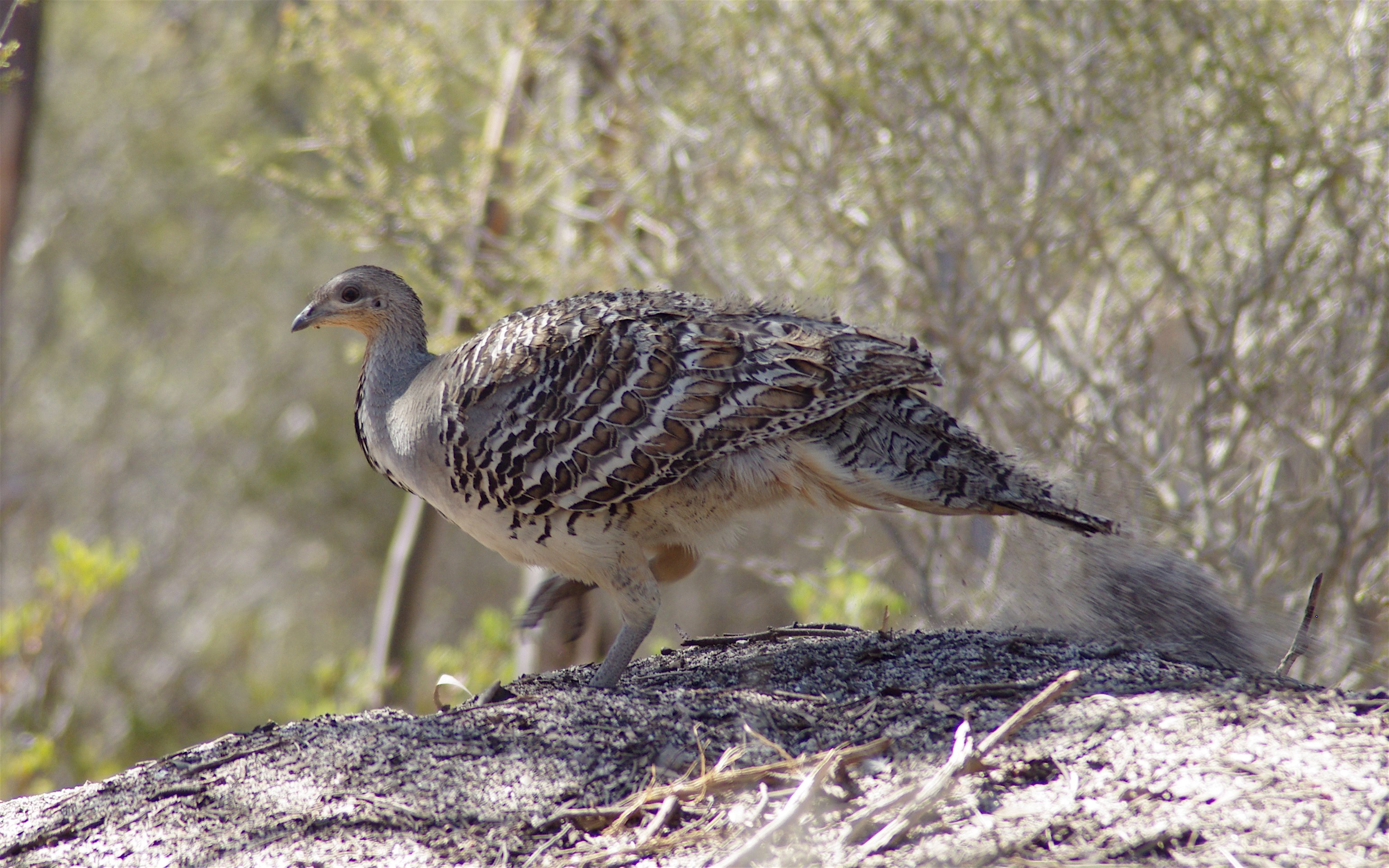
Malleefowl

Megapodiidae are represented by various species in the Australasian region. They are commonly referred to as "mound-builders" due to their habit of constructing large mounds to incubate their eggs.

| Common name | Binomial | Notes |
|---|---|---|
| Malleefowl | Leipoa ocellata | |
| Orange-footed scrubfowl | Megapodius reinwardt | |

== Guineafowl ==
Order: Galliformes Family: Numididae

Numididae are not native to Australia, but feral populations of one species exist in Western Australia.

| Common name | Binomial | Notes |
|---|---|---|
| Helmeted guineafowl | Numida meleagris | (I) |

== Pheasants, grouse, and allies ==
Order: Galliformes Family: Phasianidae

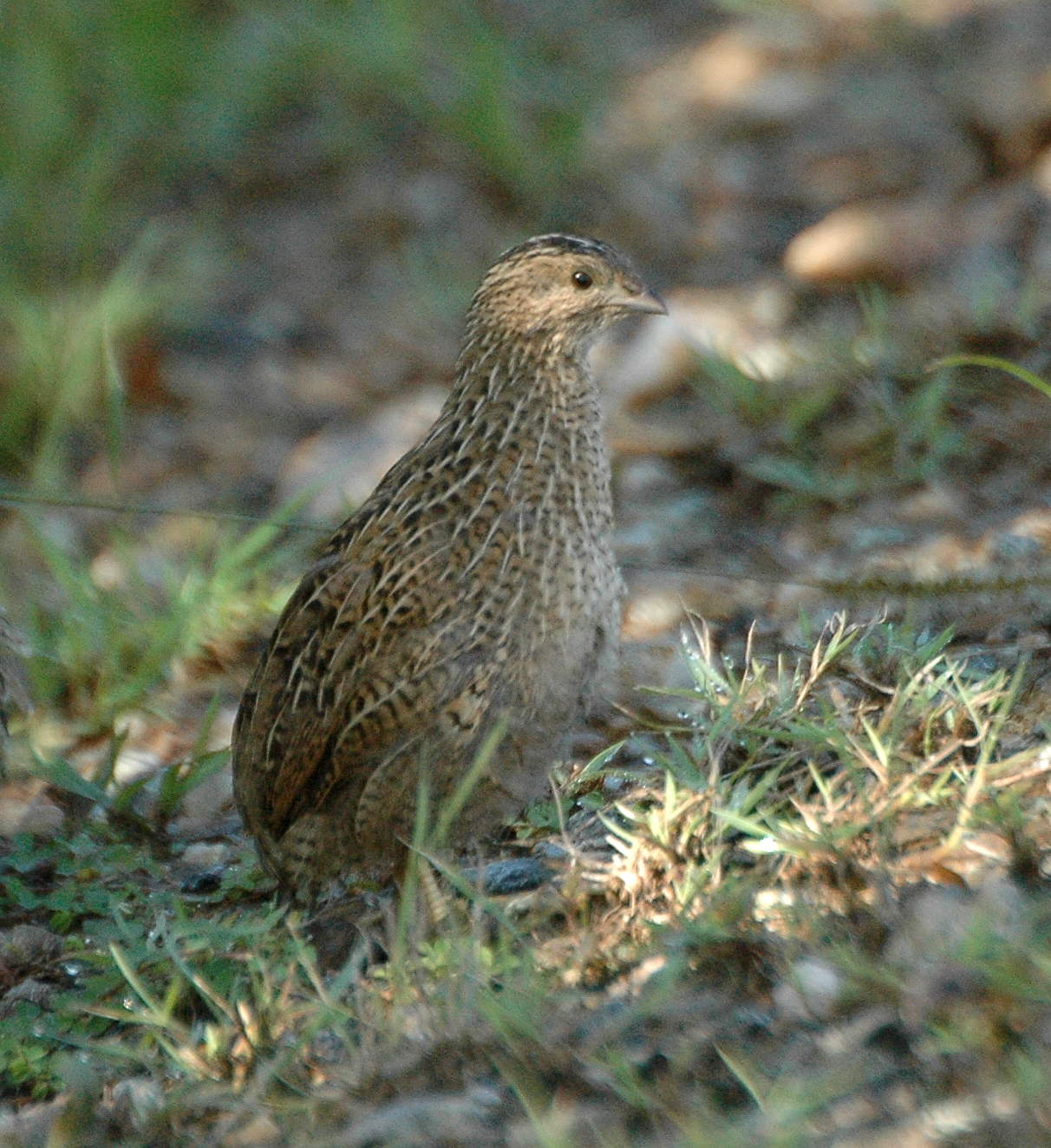
Brown quail

Phasianidae consists of the pheasants and their allies. These are terrestrial species, variable in size but generally plump, with broad, relatively short wings. Many species are gamebirds or have been domesticated as a food source for humans.

| Common name | Binomial | Notes |
|---|---|---|
| Indian peafowl | Pavo cristatus | (I) |
| Brown quail | Coturnix ypsilophora | |
| Blue-breasted quail | Excalfactoria chinensis | |
| Stubble quail | Coturnix pectoralis | |
| Ring-necked pheasant | Phasianus colchicus | (I) |

== Grebes ==
Order: Podicipediformes Family: Podicipedidae

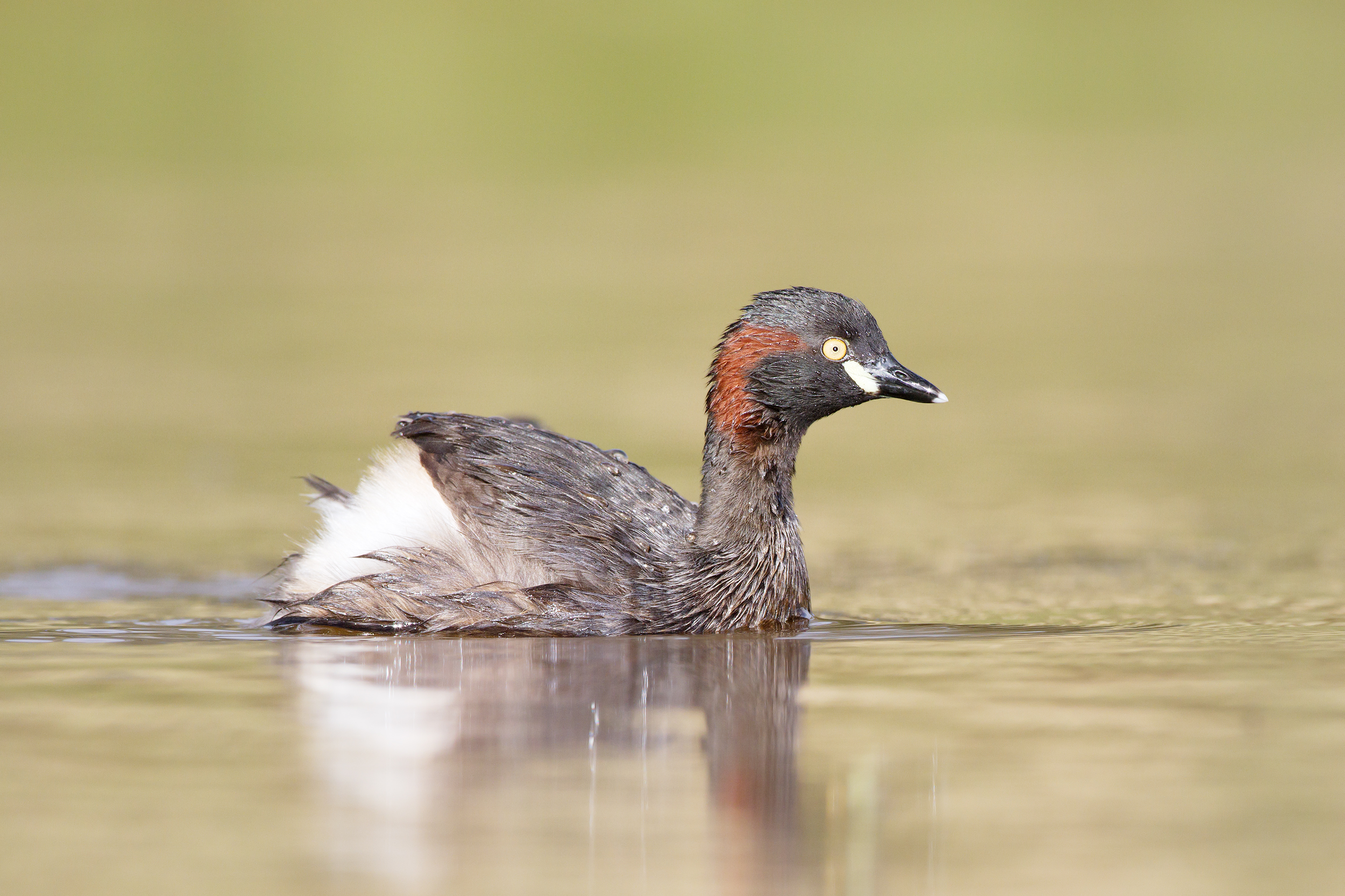
Australasian grebe

Grebes are small to medium-large freshwater diving birds. They have lobed toes and are excellent swimmers and divers. However, they have their feet placed far back on the body, making them quite ungainly on land.

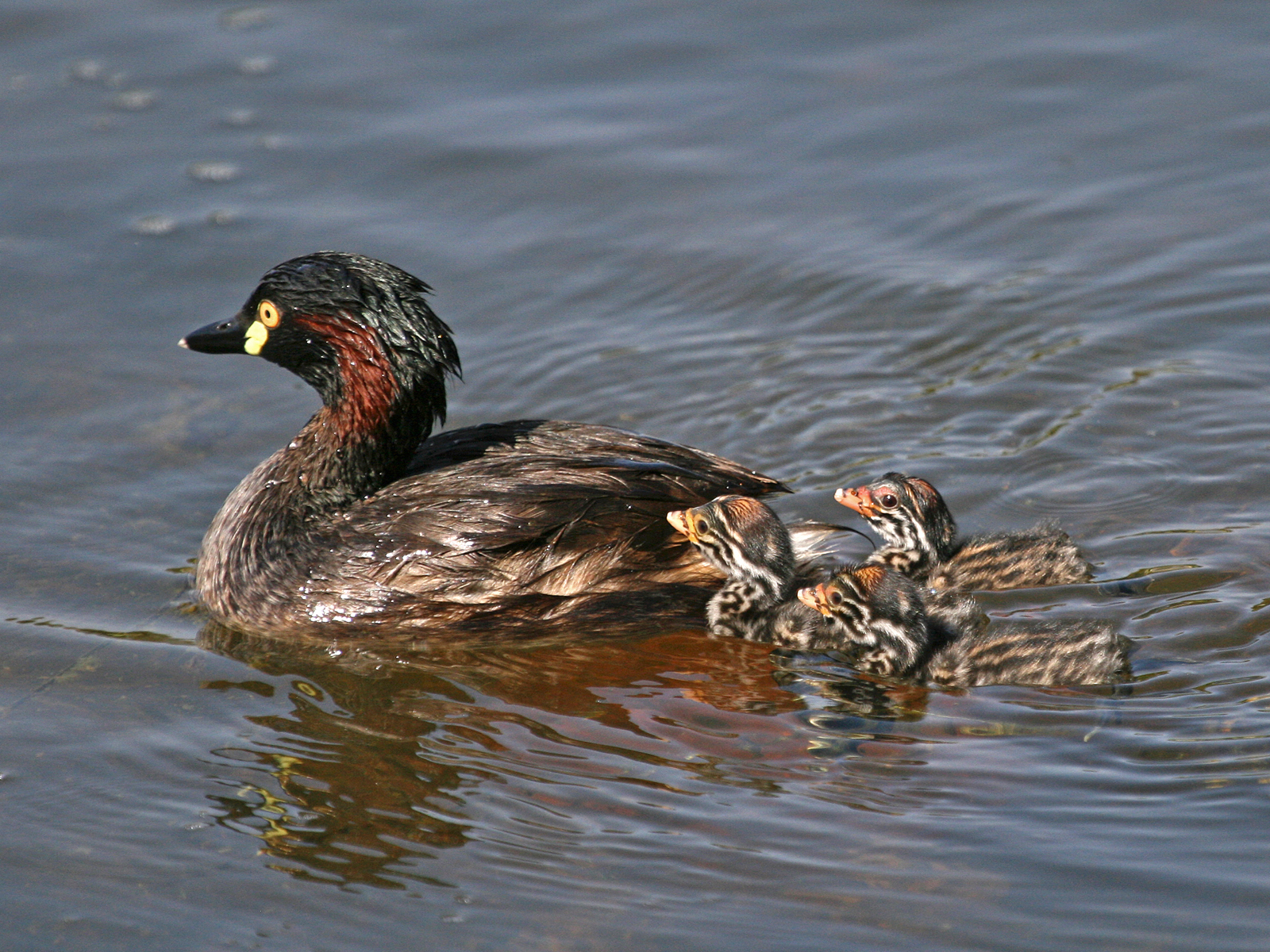
Australasian grebe

| Common name | Binomial | Notes |
|---|---|---|
| Little grebe | Tachybaptus ruficollis | (A) |
| Australasian grebe | Tachybaptus novaehollandiae | |
| Hoary-headed grebe | Poliocephalus poliocephalus | |
| Great crested grebe | Podiceps cristatus | |

== Pigeons and doves ==
Order: Columbiformes Family: Columbidae

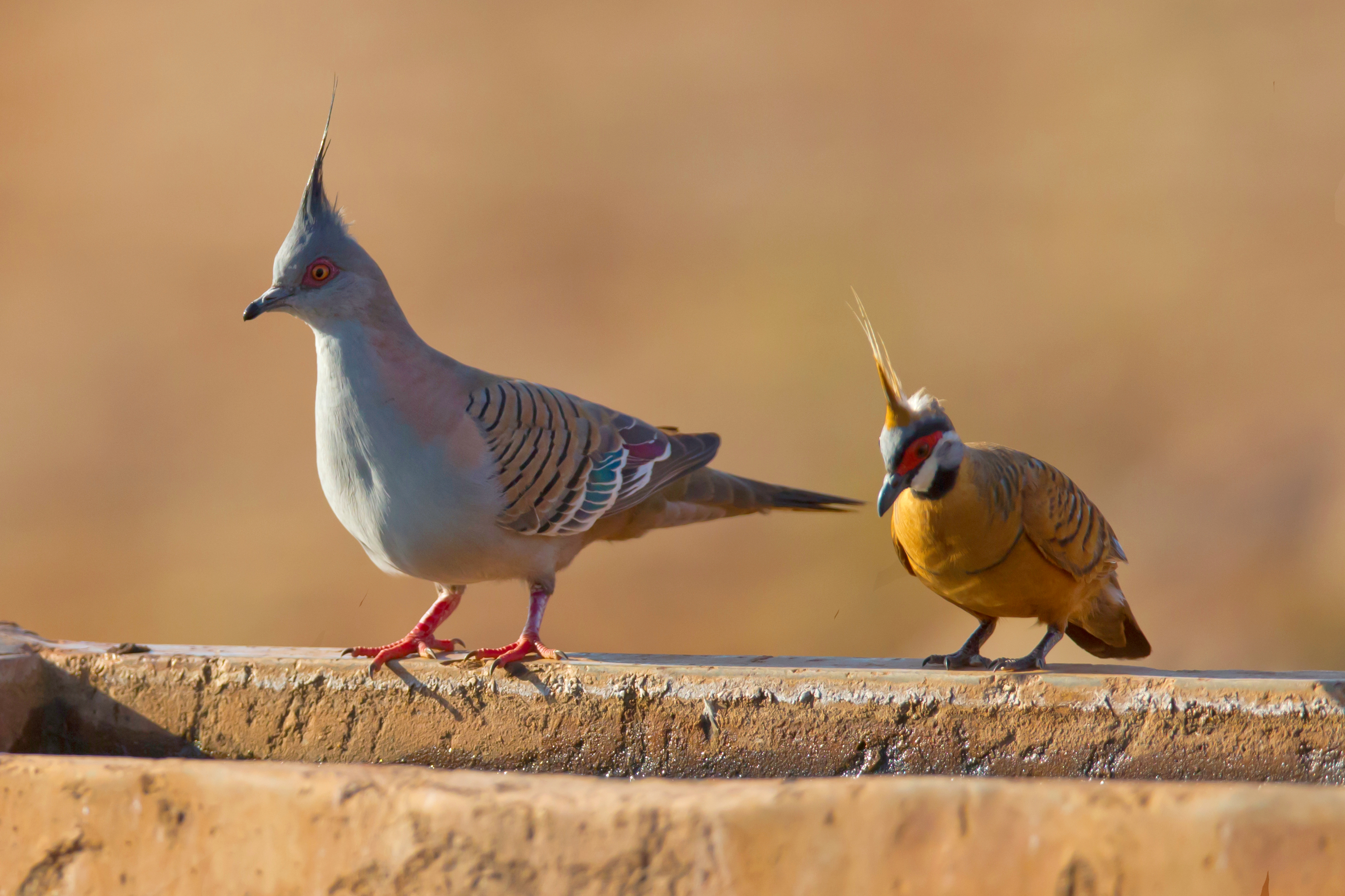
Crested pigeon and spinifex pigeon

Pigeons and doves are stout-bodied birds with short necks and short slender bills with a fleshy cere.

| Common name | Binomial | Notes |
|---|---|---|
| Rock pigeon | Columba livia | (I) |
| Spotted dove | Spilopelia chinensis | (I) |
| Laughing dove | Spilopelia senegalensis | (I) |
| Pacific emerald dove | Chalcophaps longirostris | |
| Common bronzewing | Phaps chalcoptera | |
| Brush bronzewing | Phaps elegans | |
| Flock bronzewing | Phaps histrionica | |
| Crested pigeon | Ocyphaps lophotes | |
| Spinifex pigeon | Geophaps plumifera | |
| Partridge pigeon | Geophaps smithii | |
| White-quilled rock-pigeon | Petrophassa albipennis | |
| Diamond dove | Geopelia cuneata | |
| Peaceful dove | Geopelia placida | |
| Bar-shouldered dove | Geopelia humeralis | |
| Nicobar pigeon | Caloenas nicobarica | (A) |
| Rose-crowned fruit-dove | Ptilinopus regina | |
| Torresian imperial-pigeon | Ducula spilorrhoa | |

== Bustards ==
Order: Otidiformes Family: Otididae

| Common name | Binomial | Notes |
|---|---|---|
| Australian bustard | Ardeotis australis | |

== Cuckoos ==
Order: Cuculiformes Family: Cuculidae

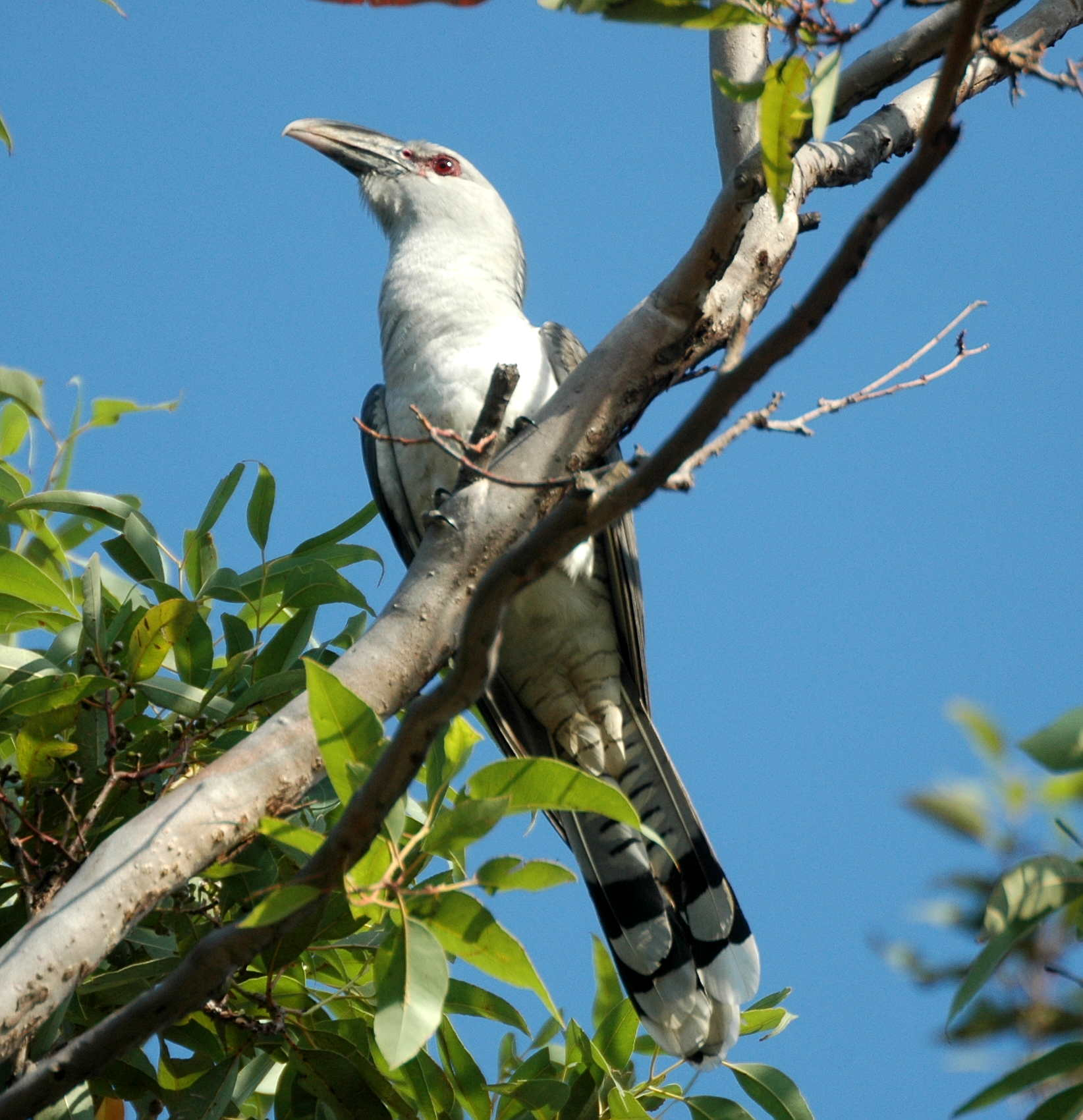
Channel-billed cuckoo

| Common name | Binomial | Notes |
|---|---|---|
| Lesser coucal | Centropus bengalensis | |
| Pheasant coucal | Centropus phasianinus | |
| Asian koel | Eudynamys scolopaceus | (A) |
| Pacific koel | Eudynamys orientalis | |
| Channel-billed cuckoo | Scythrops novaehollandiae | |
| Horsfield's bronze-cuckoo | Chalcites basalis | |
| Black-eared cuckoo | Chalcites osculans | |
| Shining bronze-cuckoo | Chalcites lucidus | |
| Little bronze-cuckoo | Chalcites minutillus | |
| Pallid cuckoo | Cacomantis pallidus | |
| Fan-tailed cuckoo | Cacomantis flabelliformis | |
| Brush cuckoo | Cacomantis variolosus | |
| Oriental cuckoo | Cuculus optatus | |

== Frogmouths ==
Order: Caprimulgiformes Family: Podargidae

The frogmouths are a distinctive group of small nocturnal birds related to swifts found from India across southern Asia to Australia.

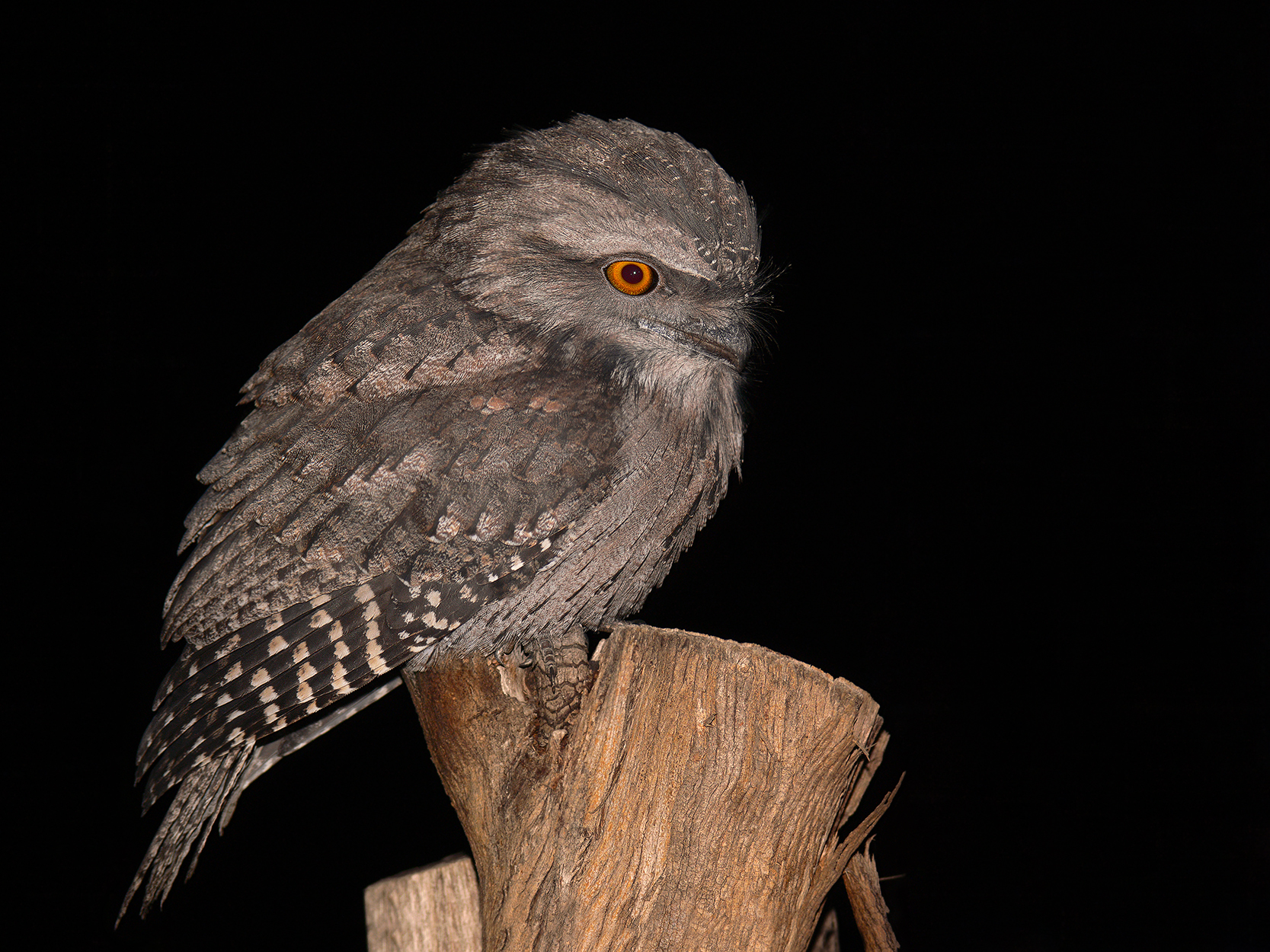
Tawny frogmouth

| Common name | Binomial | Notes |
|---|---|---|
| Tawny frogmouth | Podargus strigoides | |

== Nightjars and allies ==
Order: Caprimulgiformes Family: Caprimulgidae

| Common name | Binomial | Notes |
|---|---|---|
| Spotted nightjar | Eurostopodus argus | |
| Gray nightjar | Caprimulgus jotaka | |
| Savanna nightjar | Caprimulgus affinis | |

== Owlet-nightjars ==
Order: Caprimulgiformes Family: Aegothelidae

The owlet-nightjars are a distinctive group of small nocturnal birds related to swifts found from the Maluku Islands and New Guinea to Australia and New Caledonia.

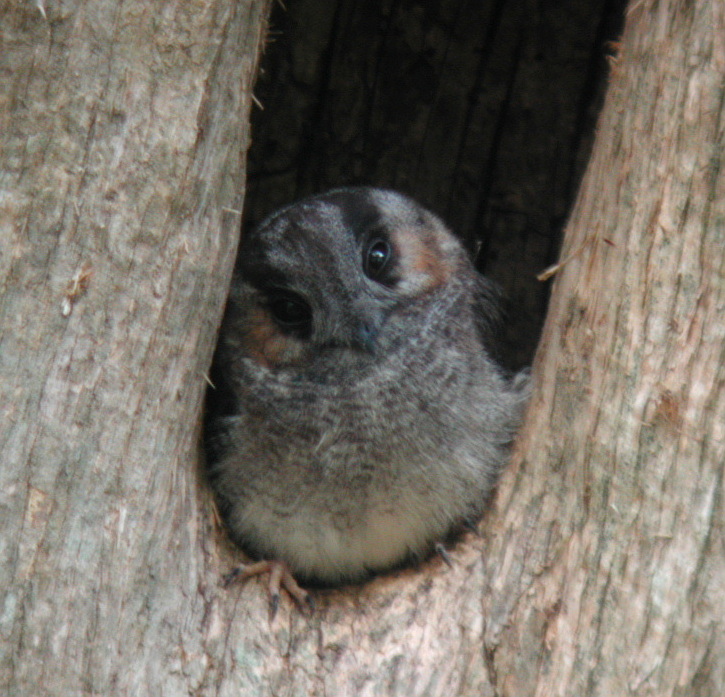
Australian owlet-nightjar

| Common name | Binomial | Notes |
|---|---|---|
| Australian owlet-nightjar | Aegotheles cristatus | |

== Swifts ==
Order: Caprimulgiformes Family: Apodidae

Swifts are small birds which spend the majority of their lives flying. These birds have very short legs and never settle voluntarily on the ground, perching instead only on vertical surfaces. Many swifts have long swept-back wings which resemble a crescent or boomerang.

| Common name | Binomial | Notes |
|---|---|---|
| White-throated needletail | Hirundapus caudacutus | |
| Pacific swift | Apus pacificus | |
| House swift | Apus affinis | vagrant |

== Rails, gallinules, and coots ==
Order: Gruiformes Family: Rallidae

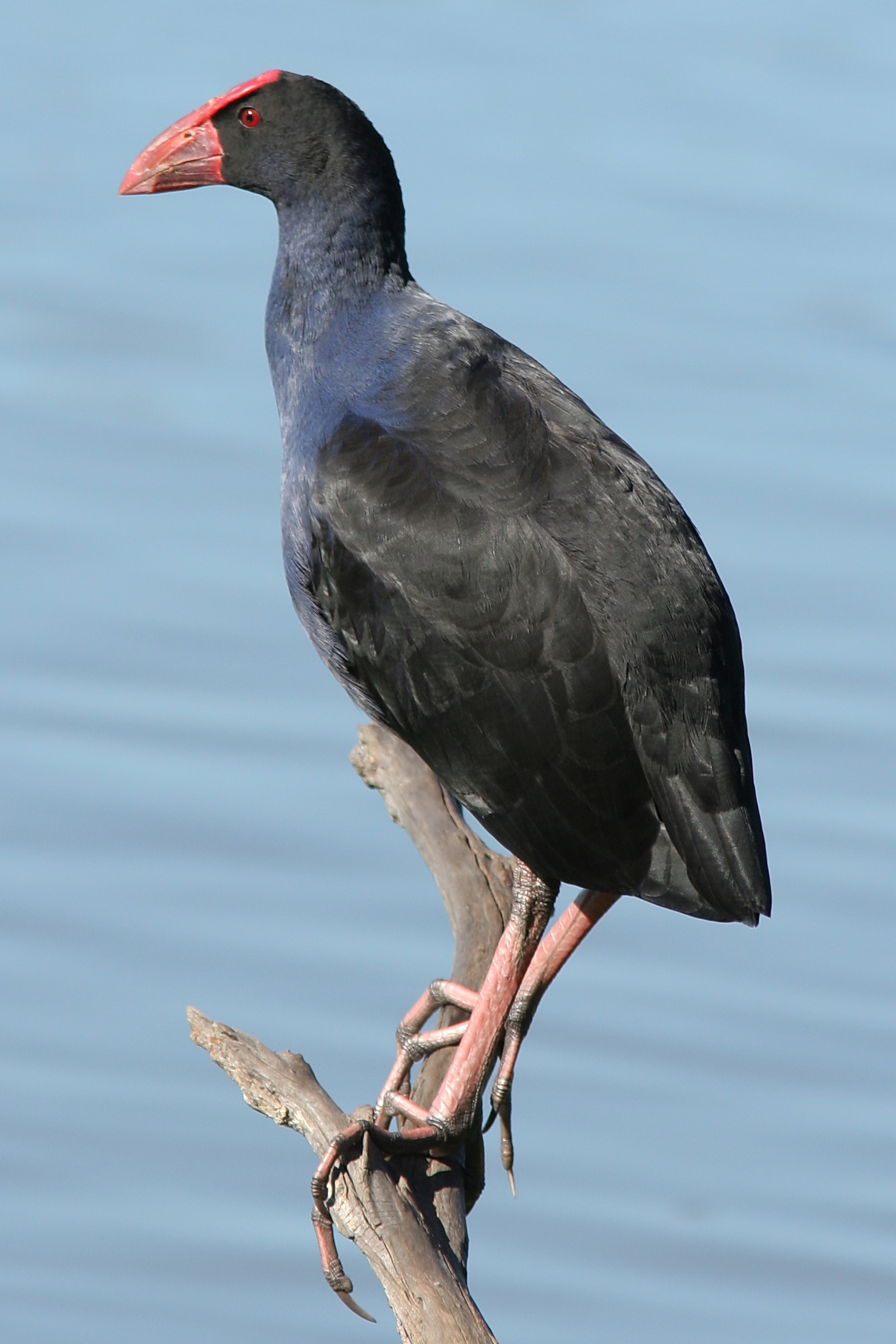
Australasian swamphen

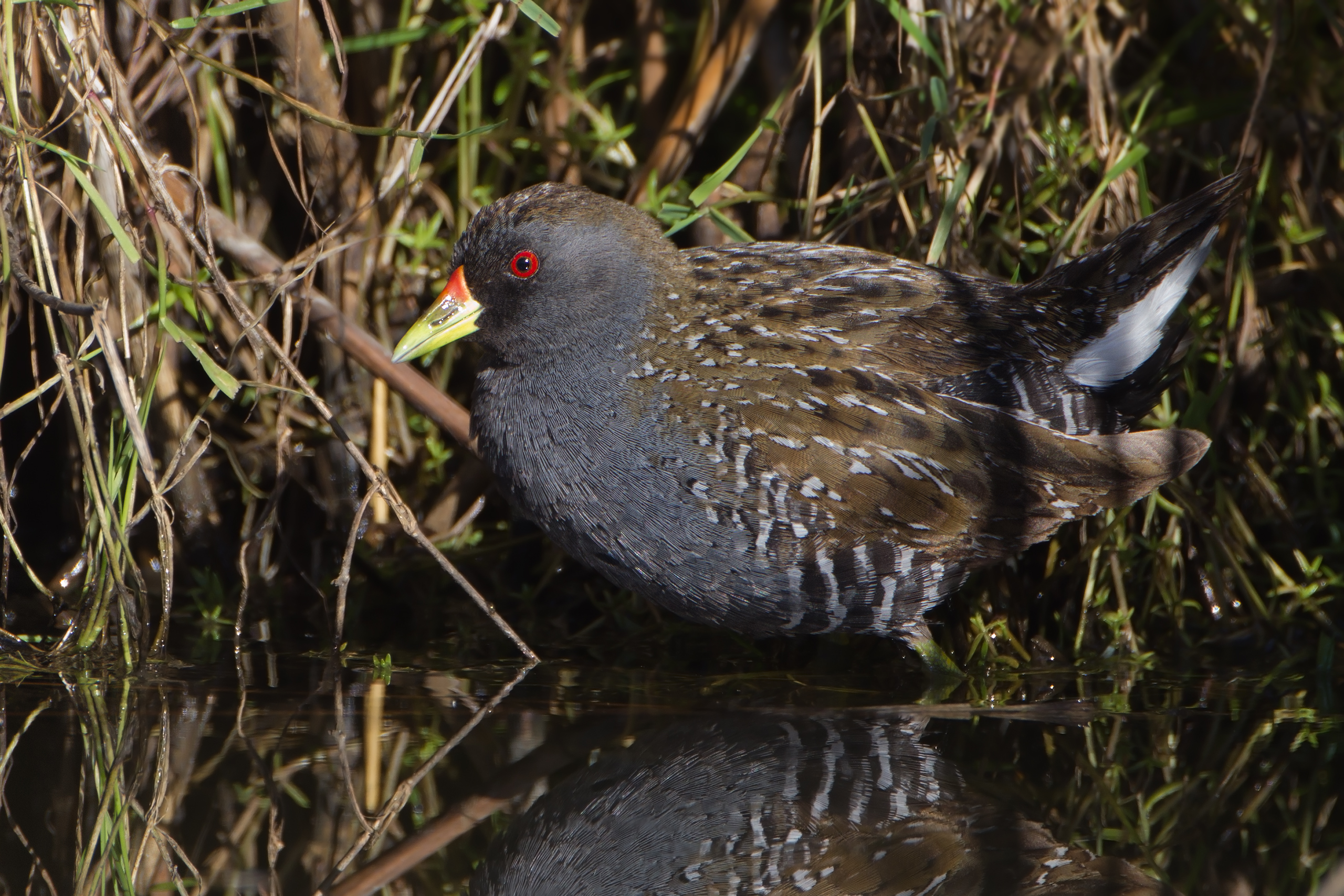
Australian crake

| Common name | Binomial | Notes |
|---|---|---|
| Corn crake | Crex crex | (A) |
| Lewin's rail | Lewinia pectoralis | (Ex) |
| Chestnut rail | Eulabeornis castaneoventris | |
| Buff-banded rail | Gallirallus philippensis | |
| Black-tailed nativehen | Tribonyx ventralis | |
| Australian crake | Porzana fluminea | |
| Dusky moorhen | Gallinula tenebrosa | |
| Eurasian coot | Fulica atra | |
| Australasian swamphen | Porphyrio melanotus | |
| Watercock | Gallicrex cinerea | |
| White-breasted waterhen | Amaurornis phoenicurus | |
| Rufous-tailed bush-hen | Amaurornis moluccana | |
| White-browed crake | Poliolimnas cinereus | |
| Red-legged crake | Rallina fasciata | (A) |
| Baillon's crake | Zapornia pusilla | |
| Spotless crake | Zapornia tabuensis | |

== Cranes ==
Order: Gruiformes Family: Gruidae

| Common name | Binomial | Notes |
|---|---|---|
| Sarus crane | Antigone antigone | (A) |
| Brolga | Antigone rubicunda | |

== Thick-knees ==
Order: Charadriiformes Family: Burhinidae

| Common name | Binomial | Notes |
|---|---|---|
| Bush thick-knee | Burhinus grallarius | |
| Beach thick-knee | Esacus magnirostris | |

== Stilts and avocets ==
Order: Charadriiformes Family: Recurvirostridae

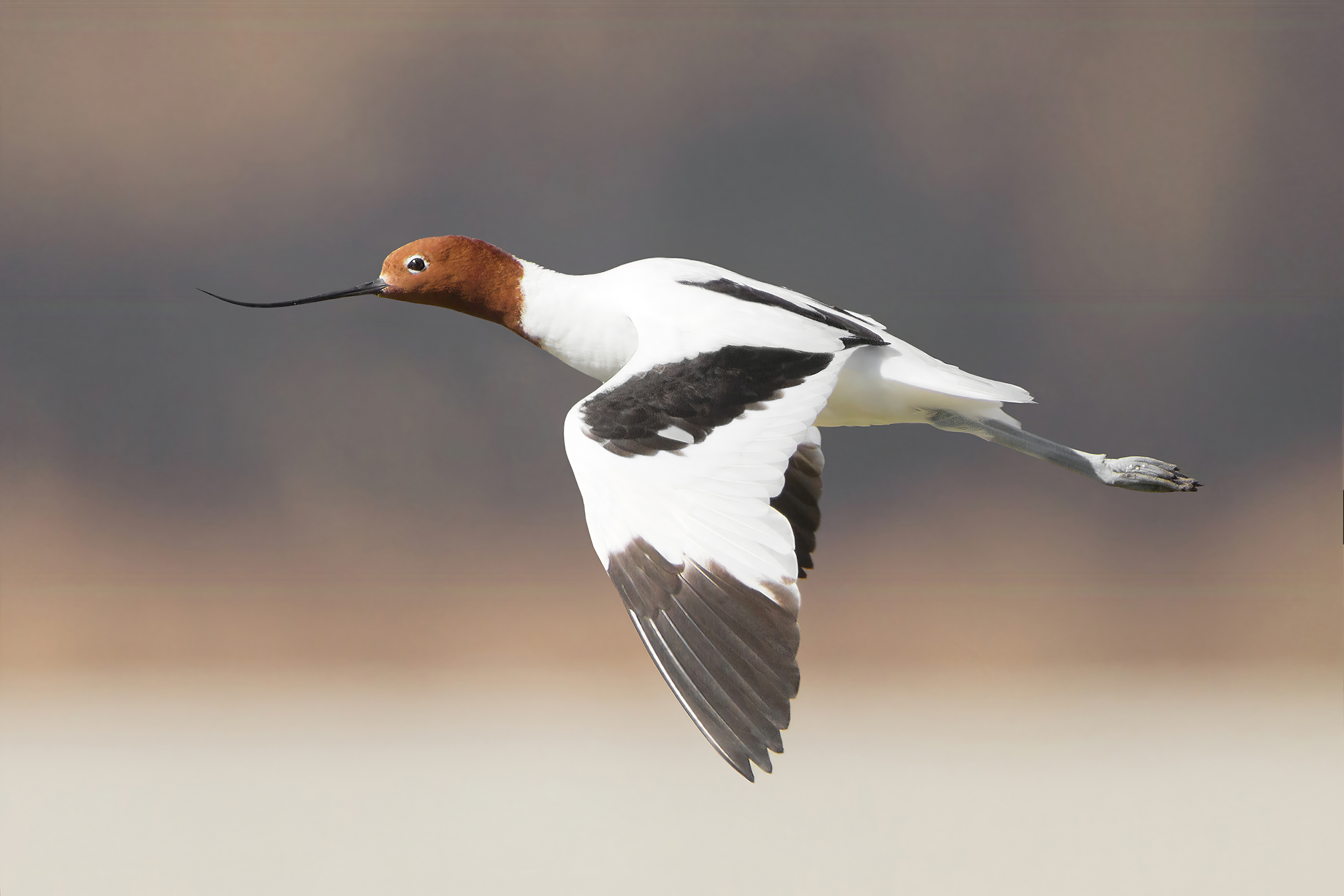
Red-necked avocet

| Common name | Binomial | Notes |
|---|---|---|
| Pied stilt | Himantopus leucocephalus | |
| Banded stilt | Cladorhynchus leucocephalus | |
| Red-necked avocet | Recurvirostra novaehollandiae | |

== Oystercatchers ==
Order: Charadriiformes Family: Haematopodidae

| Common name | Binomial | Notes |
|---|---|---|
| Pied oystercatcher | Haematopus longirostris | |
| Sooty oystercatcher | Haematopus fuliginosus | |

== Plovers and lapwings ==
Order: Charadriiformes Family: Charadriidae

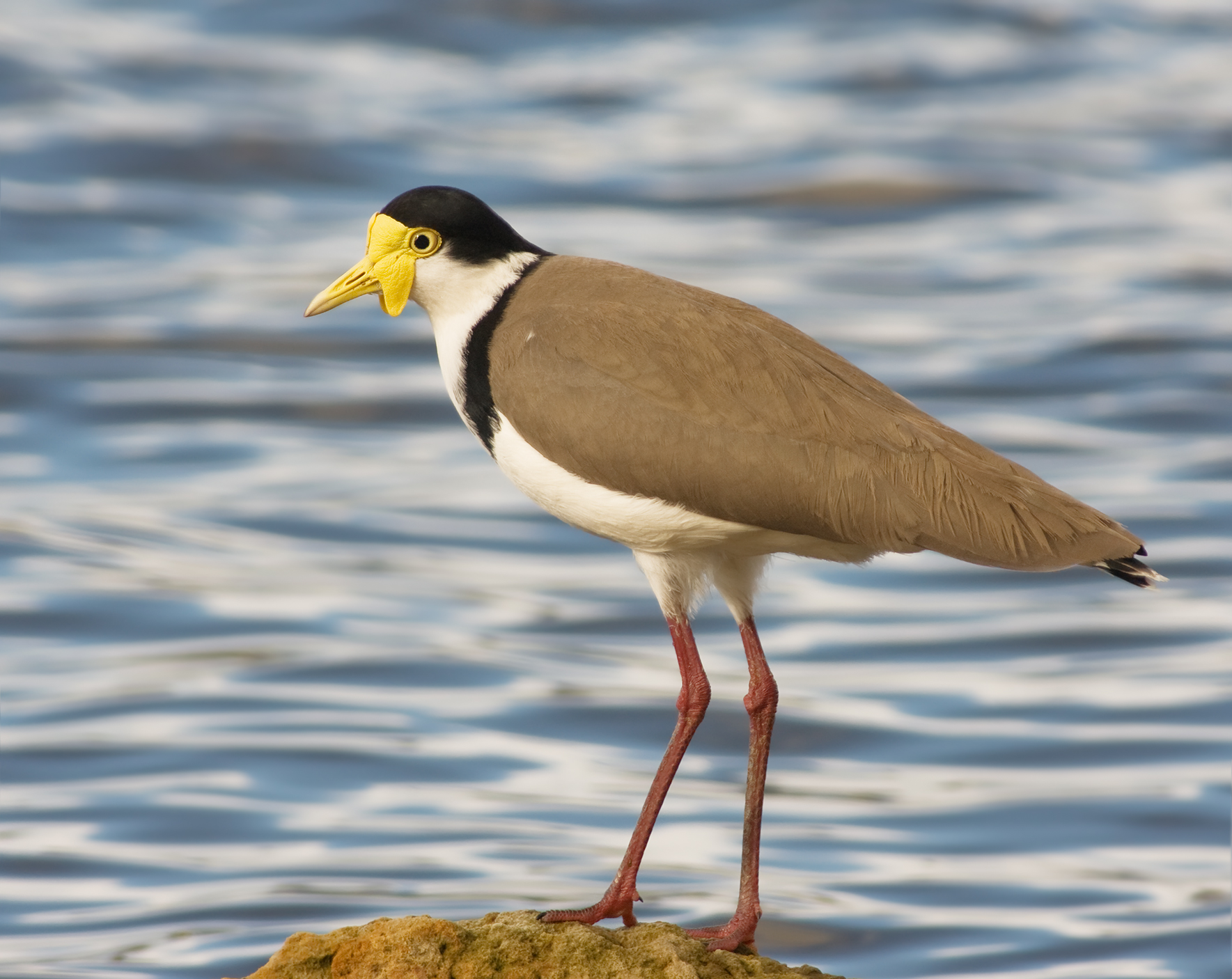
Masked lapwing

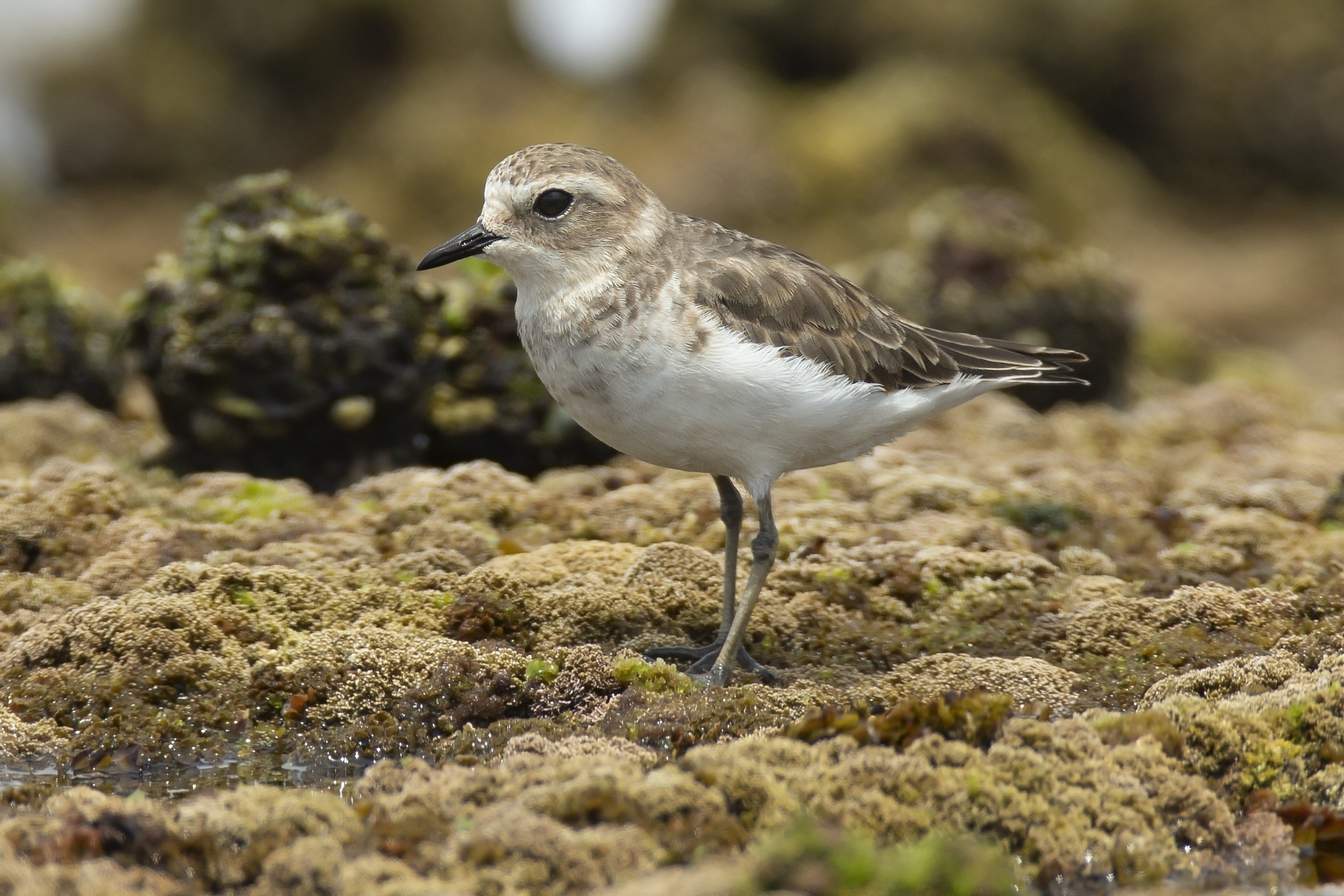
Double-banded plover non-breeding plumage

| Common name | Binomial | Notes |
|---|---|---|
| Black-bellied plover | Pluvialis squatarola | |
| American golden-plover | Pluvialis dominicus | (A) |
| Pacific golden-plover | Pluvialis fulva | |
| Gray-headed lapwing | Vanellus cinereus | (A) |
| Banded lapwing | Vanellus tricolor | |
| Masked lapwing | Vanellus miles | |
| Lesser sand-plover | Charadrius mongolus | |
| Greater sand-plover | Charadrius leschenaultii | |
| Double-banded plover | Charadrius bicinctus | (A) |
| Red-capped plover | Charadrius ruficapillus | |
| Kentish plover | Charadrius alexandrinus | (A) |
| Common ringed plover | Charadrius hiaticula | (A) |
| Semipalmated plover | Charadrius semipalmatus | (A) |
| Little ringed plover | Charadrius dubius | (A) |
| Oriental plover | Charadrius veredus | |
| Red-kneed dotterel | Erythrogonys cinctus | |
| Hooded plover | Thinornis cucullatus | |
| Black-fronted dotterel | Elseyornis melanops | |
| Inland dotterel | Charadrius australis | |

== Painted-snipes ==
Order: Charadriiformes Family: Rostratulidae

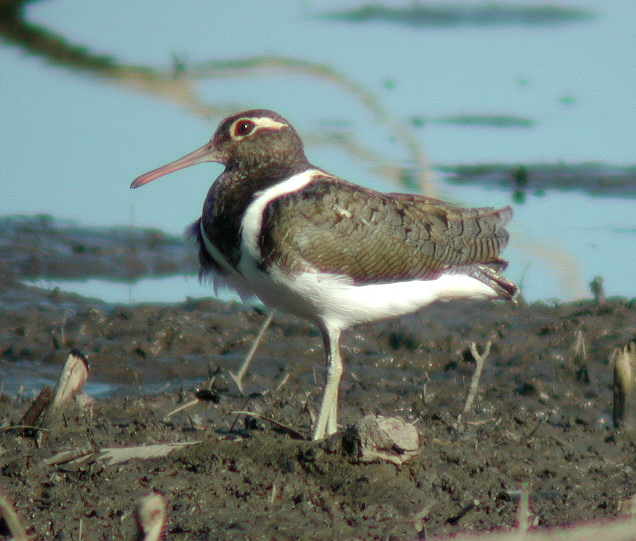
Australian painted-snipe

| Common name | Binomial | Notes |
|---|---|---|
| Australian painted-snipe | Rostratula australis | |

== Jacanas ==
Order: Charadriiformes Family: Jacanidae

2 species recorded [1 extant native, 1 vagrant]

| Common name | Binomial | Notes |
|---|---|---|
| Comb-crested jacana | Irediparra gallinacea | |
| Pheasant-tailed jacana | Hydrophasianus chirurgus | (A) |

== Sandpipers and allies ==
Order: Charadriiformes Family: Scolopacidae

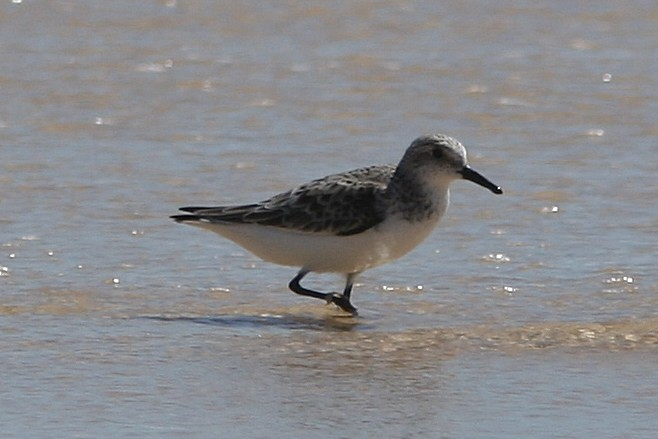
Sanderling

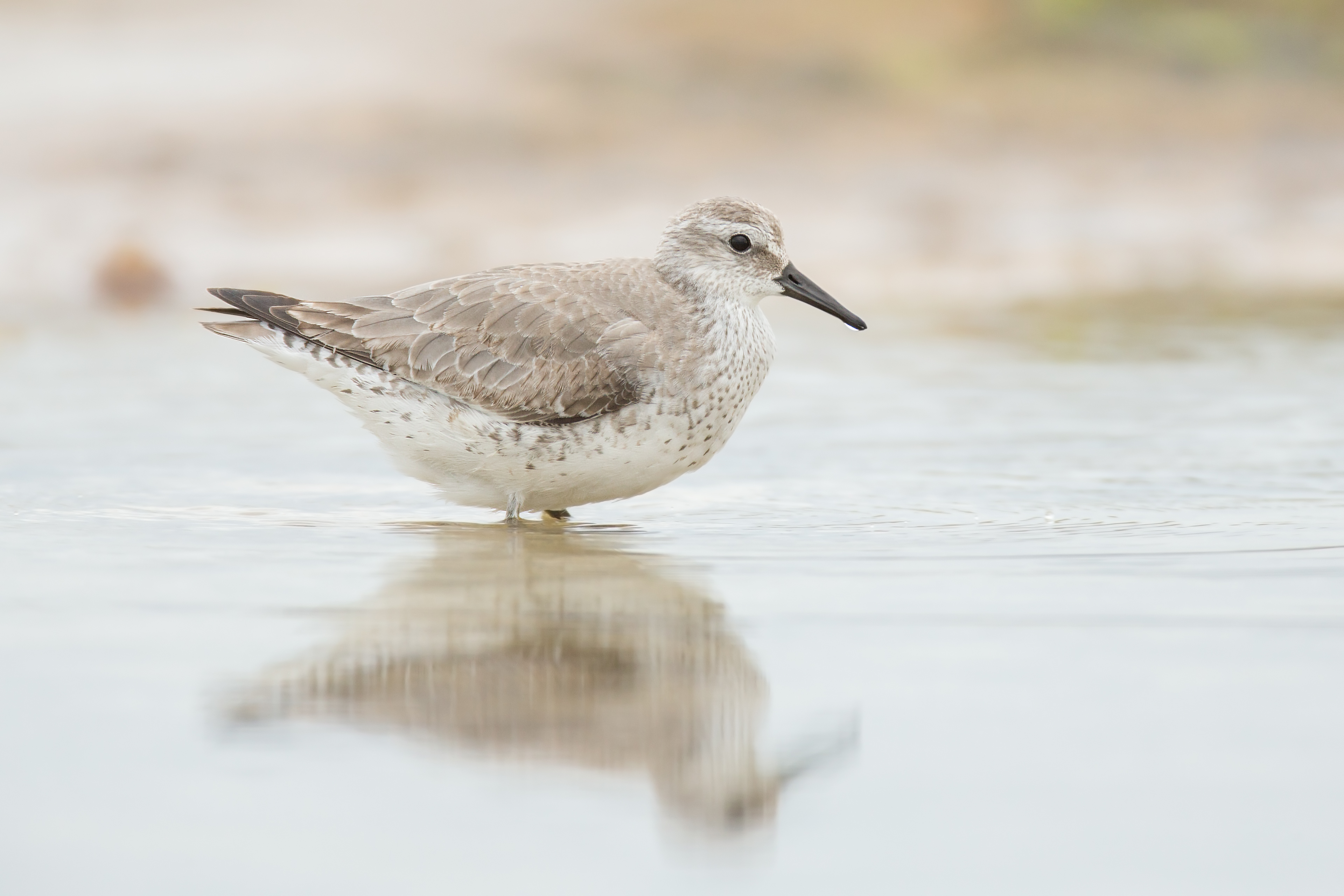
Red knot

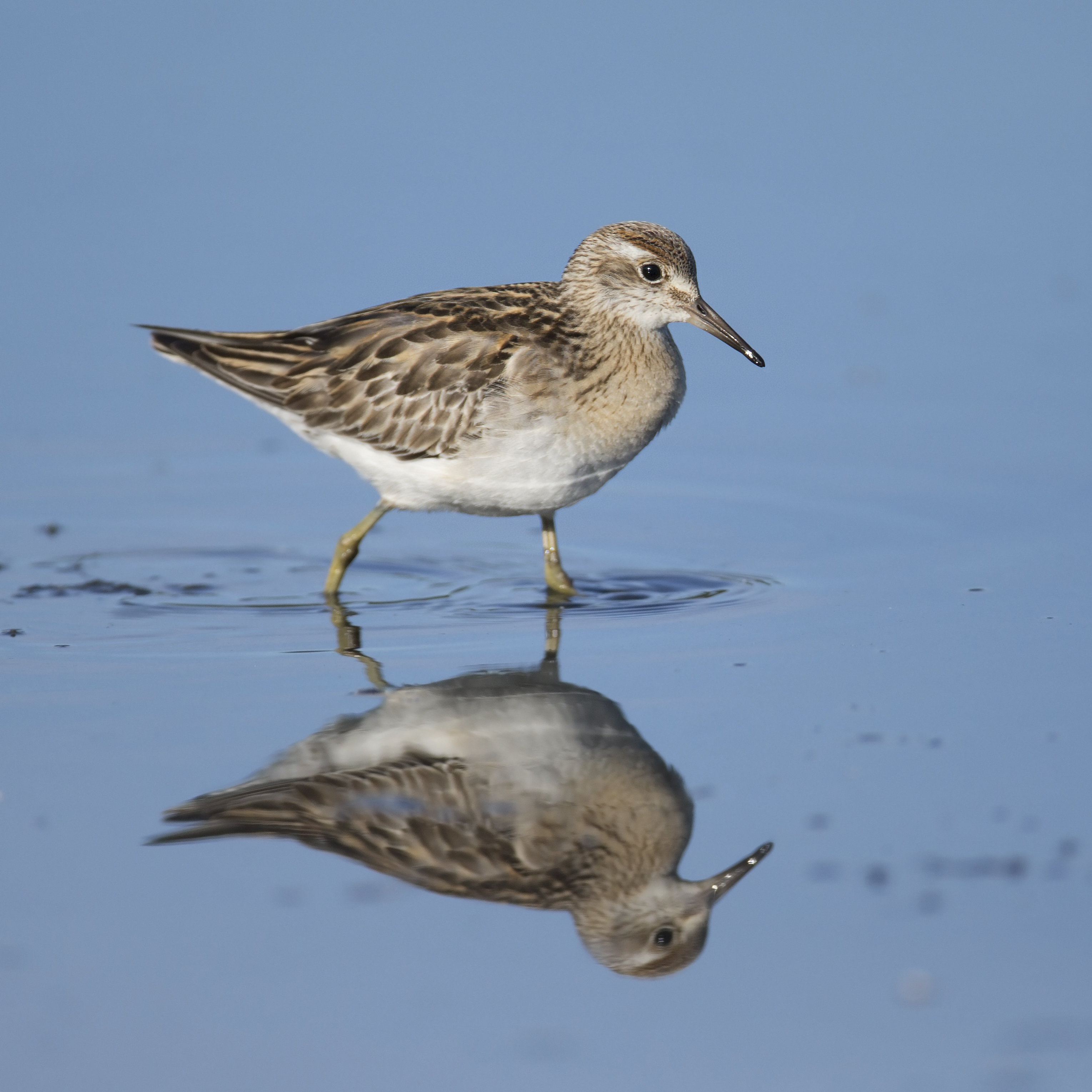
Sharp-tailed sandpiper

| Common name | Binomial | Notes |
|---|---|---|
| Whimbrel | Numenius phaeopus | |
| Little curlew | Numenius minutus | |
| Far Eastern curlew | Numenius madagascariensis | |
| Eurasian curlew | Numenius arquata | (A) |
| Bar-tailed godwit | Limosa lapponica | |
| Black-tailed godwit | Limosa limosa | |
| Hudsonian godwit | Limosa haemastica | (A) |
| Ruddy turnstone | Arenaria interpres | |
| Great knot | Calidris tenuirostris | |
| Red knot | Calidris canutus | |
| Ruff | Calidris pugnax | (A) |
| Broad-billed sandpiper | Calidris falcinellus | |
| Sharp-tailed sandpiper | Calidris acuminata | |
| Curlew sandpiper | Calidris ferruginea | |
| Temminck's stint | Calidris temminckii | (A) |
| Long-toed stint | Calidris subminuta | |
| Red-necked stint | Calidris ruficollis | |
| Sanderling | Calidris alba | |
| Dunlin | Calidris alpina | (A) |
| Baird's sandpiper | Calidris bairdii | (A) |
| Little stint | Calidris minuta | (A) |
| White-rumped sandpiper | Calidris fuscicollis | (A) |
| Buff-breasted sandpiper | Calidris subruficollis | (A) |
| Pectoral sandpiper | Calidris melanotos | |
| Asian dowitcher | Limnodromus semipalmatus | |
| Latham's snipe | Gallinago hardwickii | (A) |
| Pin-tailed snipe | Gallinago stenura | (A) |
| Swinhoe's snipe | Gallinago megala | |
| Terek sandpiper | Xenus cinereus | |
| Red-necked phalarope | Phalaropus lobatus | |
| Red phalarope | Phalaropus fulicarius | (A) |
| Common sandpiper | Actitis hypoleucos | |
| Gray-tailed tattler | Tringa brevipes | |
| Spotted redshank | Tringa erythropus | (A) |
| Common greenshank | Tringa nebularia | |
| Nordmann's greenshank | Tringa guttifer | (A) |
| Marsh sandpiper | Tringa stagnatilis | |
| Wood sandpiper | Tringa glareola | |
| Common redshank | Tringa totanus | (A) |

== Buttonquail ==
Order: Charadriiformes Family: Turnicidae

| Common name | Binomial | Notes |
|---|---|---|
| Red-backed buttonquail | Turnix maculosus | |
| Chestnut-backed buttonquail | Turnix castanotus | |
| Painted buttonquail | Turnix varius | |
| Red-chested buttonquail | Turnix pyrrhothorax | |
| Little buttonquail | Turnix velox | |

== Pratincoles and coursers ==
Order: Charadriiformes Family: Glareolidae

| Common name | Binomial | Notes |
|---|---|---|
| Australian pratincole | Stiltia isabella | |
| Collared pratincole | Glareola pratincola | (A) |
| Oriental pratincole | Glareola maldivarum | |

== Skuas and jaegers ==
Order: Charadriiformes Family: Stercorariidae

| Common name | Binomial | Notes |
|---|---|---|
| South polar skua | Stercorarius maccormicki | (A) |
| Brown skua | Stercorarius antarcticus | |
| Pomarine jaeger | Stercorarius pomarinus | |
| Parasitic jaeger | Stercorarius parasiticus | |
| Long-tailed jaeger | Stercorarius longicauda | (A) |

== Gulls, terns, and skimmers ==
Order: Charadriiformes Family: Laridae

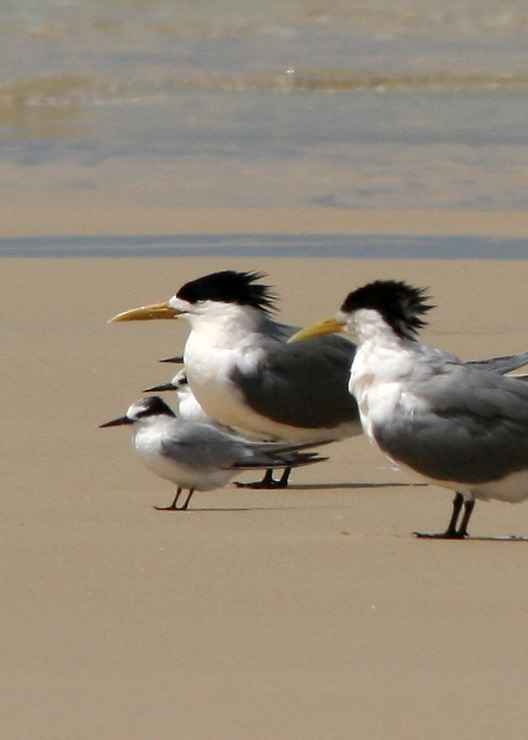
Little tern with Great crested terns

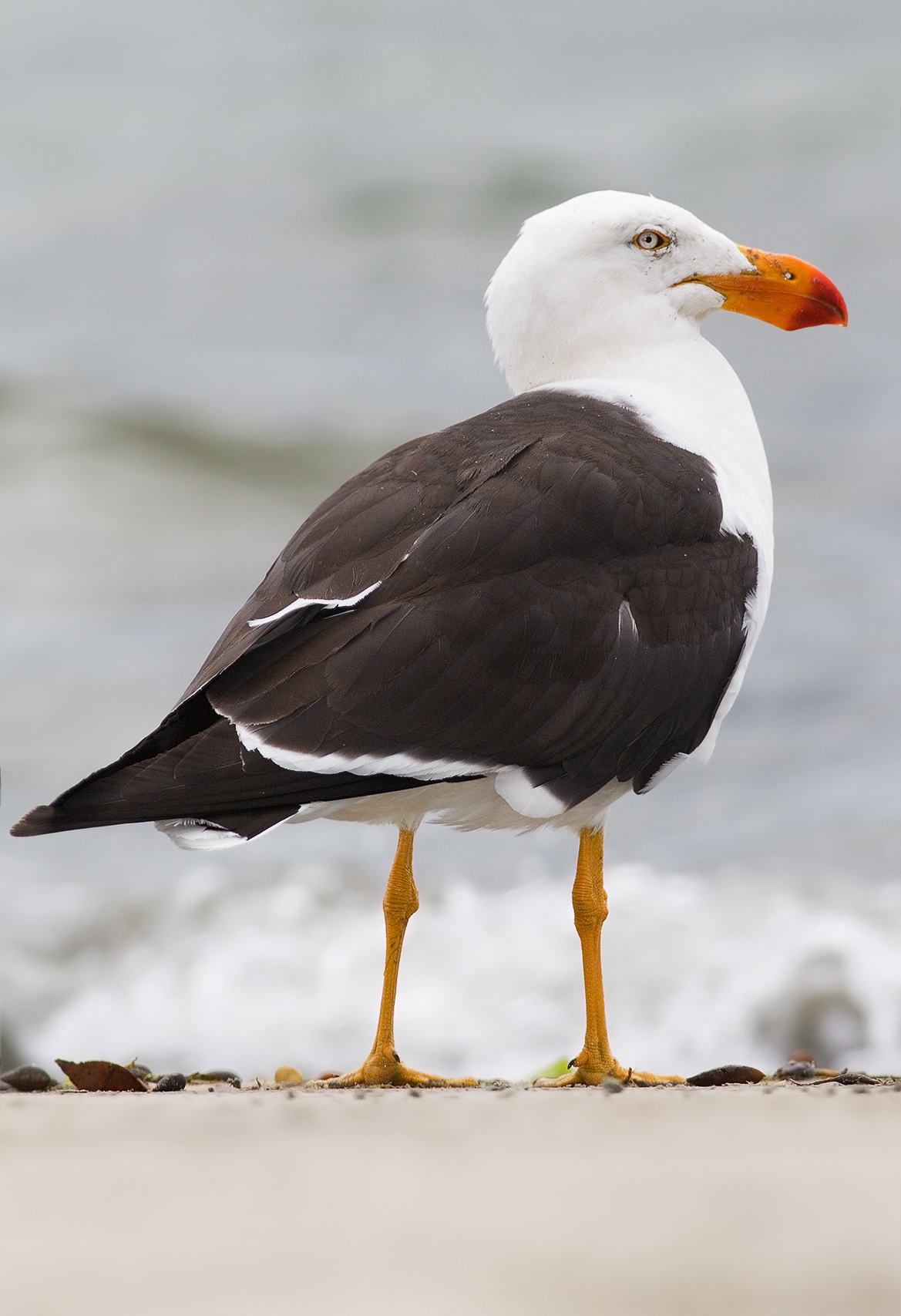
Pacific gull

| Common name | Binomial | Notes |
|---|---|---|
| Sabine's gull | Xema sabini | (A) |
| Silver gull | Chroicocephalus novaehollandiae | |
| Black-headed gull | Chroicocephalus ridibundus | (A) |
| Laughing gull | Leucophaeus atricilla | (A) |
| Franklin's gull | Leucophaeus pipixcan | (A) |
| Black-tailed gull | Larus crassirostris | (A) |
| Pacific gull | Larus pacificus | |
| Lesser black-backed gull | Larus fuscus | (A) |
| Kelp gull | Larus dominicanus | (A) |
| Brown noddy | Anous stolidus | |
| Black noddy | Anous minutus | |
| Lesser noddy | Anous tenuirostris | |
| White tern | Gygis alba | (A) |
| Sooty tern | Onychoprion fuscata | |
| Bridled tern | Onychoprion anaethetus | |
| Little tern | Sternula albifrons | |
| Australian fairy tern | Sternula nereis | |
| Gull-billed tern | Gelochelidon nilotica | |
| Caspian tern | Hydroprogne caspia | |
| White-winged tern | Chlidonias leucopterus | |
| Whiskered tern | Chlidonias hybrida | |
| Roseate tern | Sterna dougallii | |
| White-fronted tern | Sterna striata | (A) |
| Black-naped tern | Sterna sumatrana | (A) |
| Common tern | Sterna hirundo | |
| Arctic tern | Sterna paradisaea | (A) |
| Antarctic tern | Sterna vittata | (A) |
| Great crested tern | Thalasseus bergii | |
| Lesser crested tern | Thalasseus bengalensis | |

== Tropicbirds ==
Order: Phaethontiformes Family: Phaethontidae

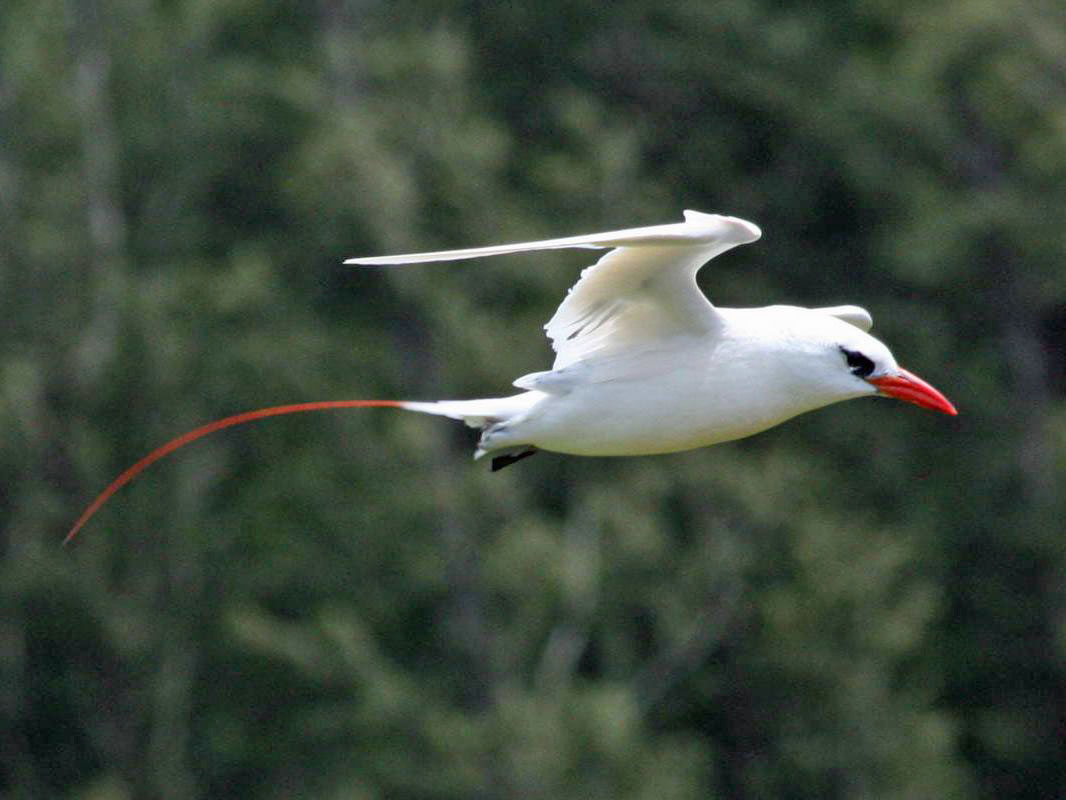
Red-tailed tropicbird

Tropicbirds are slender white birds of tropical oceans, with exceptionally long central tail feathers. Their long wings have black markings, as does the head.

| Common name | Binomial | Notes |
|---|---|---|
| White-tailed tropicbird | Phaethon lepturus | (A) |
| Red-billed tropicbird | Phaethon aethereus | |
| Red-tailed tropicbird | Phaethon rubricauda | |

== Penguins ==
Order: Sphenisciformes Family: Spheniscidae

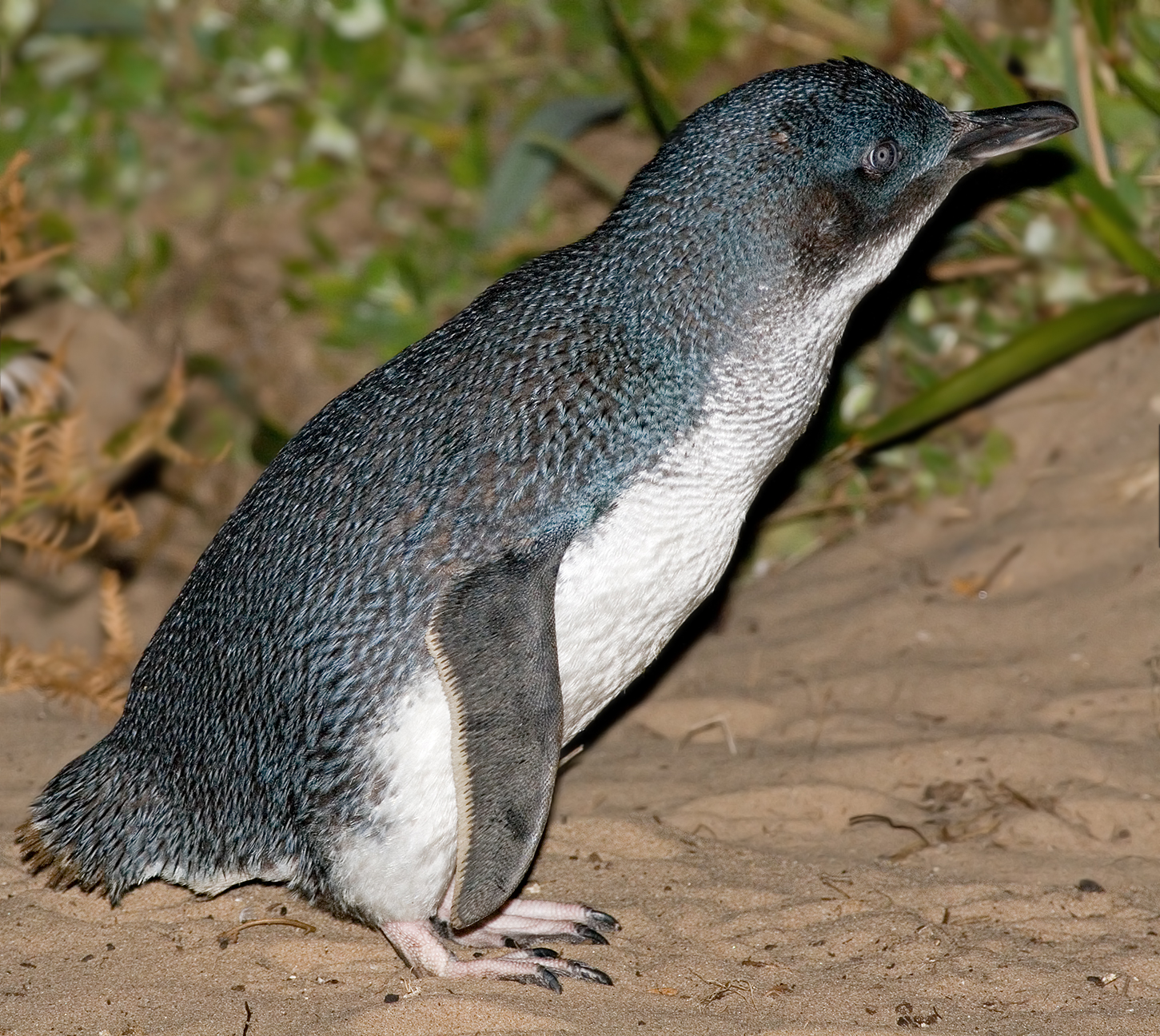
A wild little penguin returning to its burrow to feed its chicks

Penguins are a group of aquatic, flightless birds living almost exclusively in the Southern Hemisphere, especially in Antarctica. Only one species, the little penguin, breeds on the Australian coast.

| Common name | Binomial | Notes |
|---|---|---|
| King penguin | Aptenodytes patagonicus | (A) |
| Little penguin | Eudyptula minor | |
| Fiordland penguin | Eudyptes pachyrhynchus | (A) |
| Erect-crested penguin | Eudyptes sclateri | (A) |
| Macaroni penguin | Eudyptes chrysolophus | (A) |
| Royal penguin | Eudyptes schlegeli | (A) |
| Southern rockhopper penguin | Eudyptes chrysocome | (A) |
| Moseley's rockhopper penguin | Eudyptes moseleyi | (A) |
| Snares penguin | Eudyptes robustus | (A) |

== Albatrosses ==
Order: Procellariiformes Family: Diomedeidae

The albatrosses are a family of large seabird found across the Southern and North Pacific Oceans. The largest are among the largest flying birds in the world.

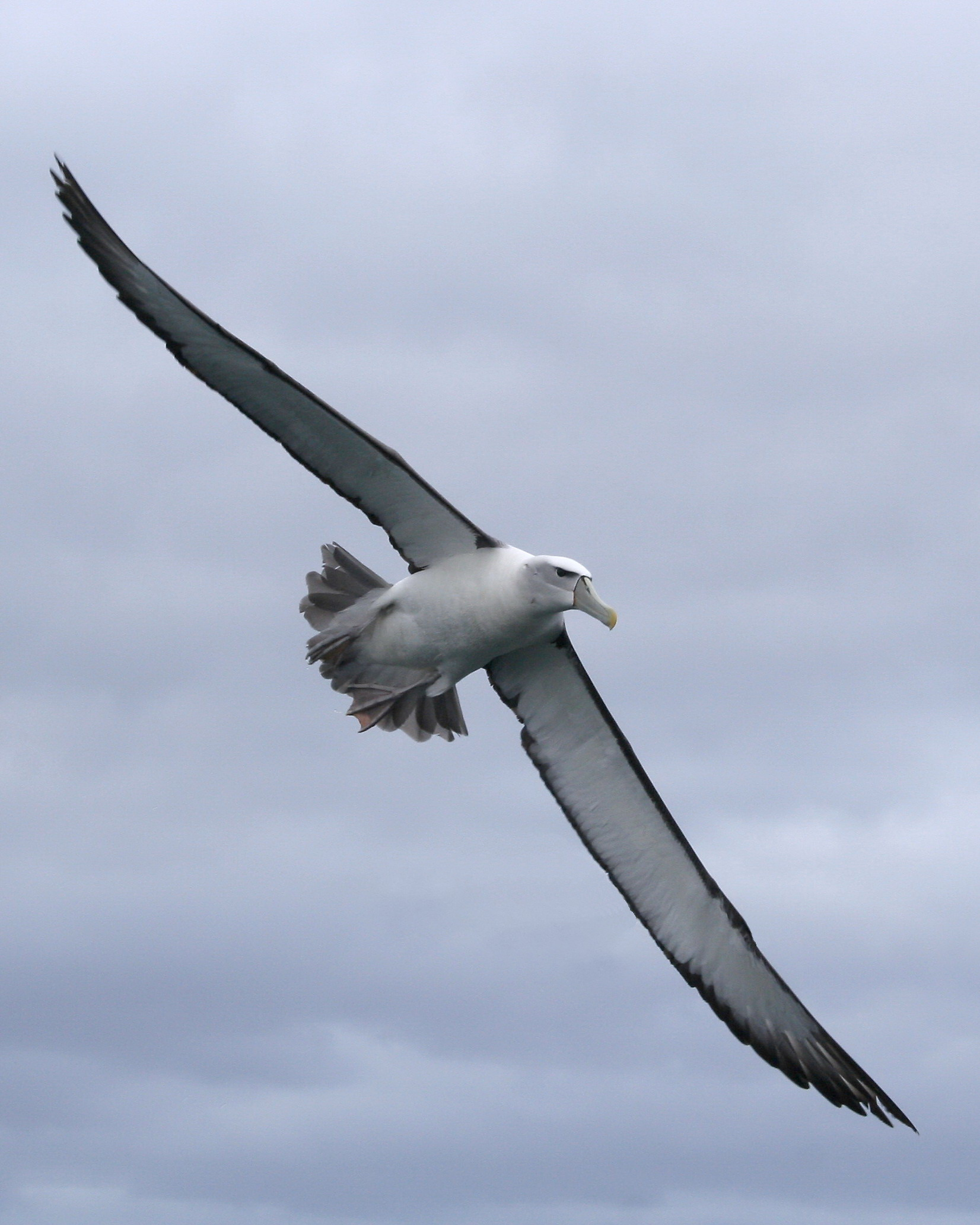
White-capped albatross

| Common name | Binomial | Notes |
|---|---|---|
| Yellow-nosed albatross | Thalassarche chlororhynchos | |
| Gray-headed albatross | Thalassarche chrysostoma | (A) |
| White-capped albatross | Thalassarche cauta | |
| Salvin's albatross | Thalassarche salvini | |
| Black-browed albatross | Thalassarche melanophris | |
| Sooty albatross | Phoebetria fusca | (A) |
| Light-mantled albatross | Phoebetria palpebrata | (A) |
| Royal albatross | Diomedea epomophora | (A) |
| Wandering albatross | Diomedea exulans | |

== Southern storm-petrels ==
Order: Procellariiformes Family: Oceanitidae

The southern storm-petrels are the smallest seabirds, relatives of the petrels, feeding on planktonic crustaceans and small fish picked from the surface, typically while hovering. Their flight is fluttering and sometimes bat-like.

| Common name | Binomial | Notes |
|---|---|---|
| Wilson's storm-petrel | Oceanites oceanicus | |
| Gray-backed storm-petrel | Garrodia nereis | (A) |
| White-faced storm-petrel | Pelagodroma marina | |
| Black-bellied storm-petrel | Fregetta tropica | (A) |

== Northern storm-petrels ==
Order: Procellariiformes Family: Hydrobatidae

| Common name | Binomial | Notes |
|---|---|---|
| Leach's storm petrel | Hydrobates leucorhous | (A) |
| Swinhoe's storm petrel | Hydrobates monorhis | (A) |
| Matsudaira's storm petrel | Hydrobates matsudairae | (A) |

== Shearwaters and petrels ==
Order: Procellariiformes Family: Procellariidae

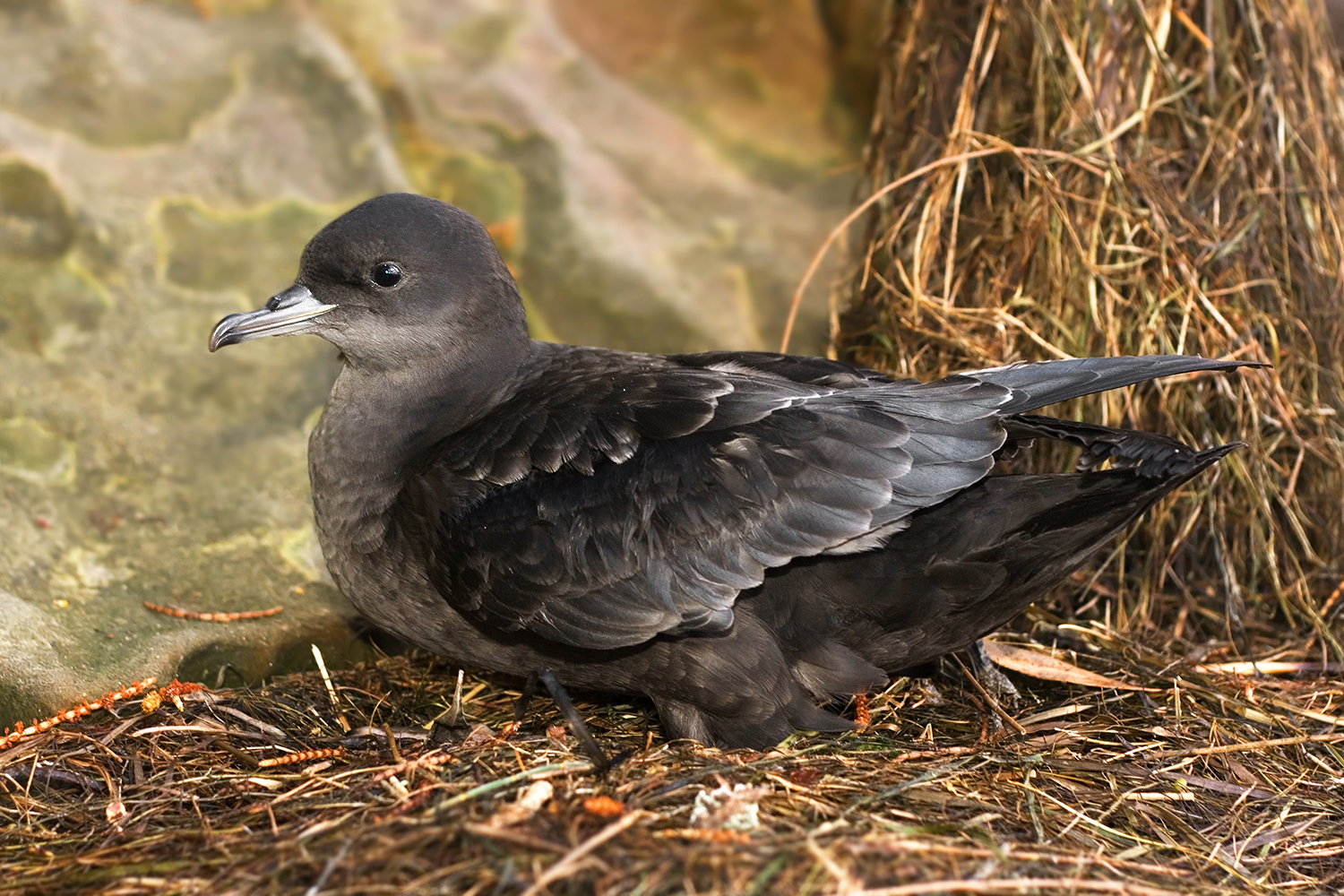
Short-tailed shearwater

The procellariids are the main group of medium-sized "true petrels", characterised by united nostrils with medium nasal septum, and a long outer functional primary flight feather.

| Common name | Binomial | Notes |
|---|---|---|
| Southern giant-petrel | Macronectes giganteus | |
| Northern giant-petrel | Macronectes halli | |
| Southern fulmar | Fulmarus glacialoides | (A) |
| Antarctic petrel | Thalassoica antarctica | (A) |
| Cape petrel | Daption capense | |
| Kerguelen petrel | Aphrodroma brevirostris | |
| Great-winged petrel | Pterodroma macroptera | |
| Gray-faced petrel | Pterodroma gouldi | |
| Herald petrel | Pterodroma heraldica | (A) |
| Soft-plumaged petrel | Pterodroma mollis | |
| Barau's petrel | Pterodroma baraui | (A) |
| White-headed petrel | Pterodroma lessonii | |
| Gould's petrel | Pterodroma leucoptera | |
| Blue petrel | Halobaena caerulea | |
| Fairy prion | Pachyptila turtur | (A) |
| Broad-billed prion | Pachyptila vittata | (A) |
| Salvin's prion | Pachyptila salvini | |
| Antarctic prion | Pachyptila desolata | |
| Slender-billed prion | Pachyptila belcheri | |
| Bulwer's petrel | Bulweria bulwerii | (A) |
| Jouanin's petrel | Bulweria fallax | (A) |
| Tahiti petrel | Pseudobulweria rostrata | (A) |
| Gray petrel | Procellaria cinerea | (A) |
| White-chinned petrel | Procellaria aequinoctialis | |
| Streaked shearwater | Calonectris leucomelas | |
| Cory's shearwater | Calonectris diomedea | (A) |
| Flesh-footed shearwater | Ardenna carneipes | |
| Great shearwater | Ardenna gravis | (A) |
| Wedge-tailed shearwater | Ardenna pacifica | |
| Sooty shearwater | Ardenna grisea | (A) |
| Short-tailed shearwater | Ardenna tenuirostris | |
| Hutton's shearwater | Puffinus huttoni | |
| Fluttering shearwater | Puffinus gavia | (A) |
| Little shearwater | Puffinus assimilis | |
| Persian shearwater | Puffinus persicus | (A) |
| Heinroth's shearwater | Puffinus heinrothi | (A) |

== Storks ==
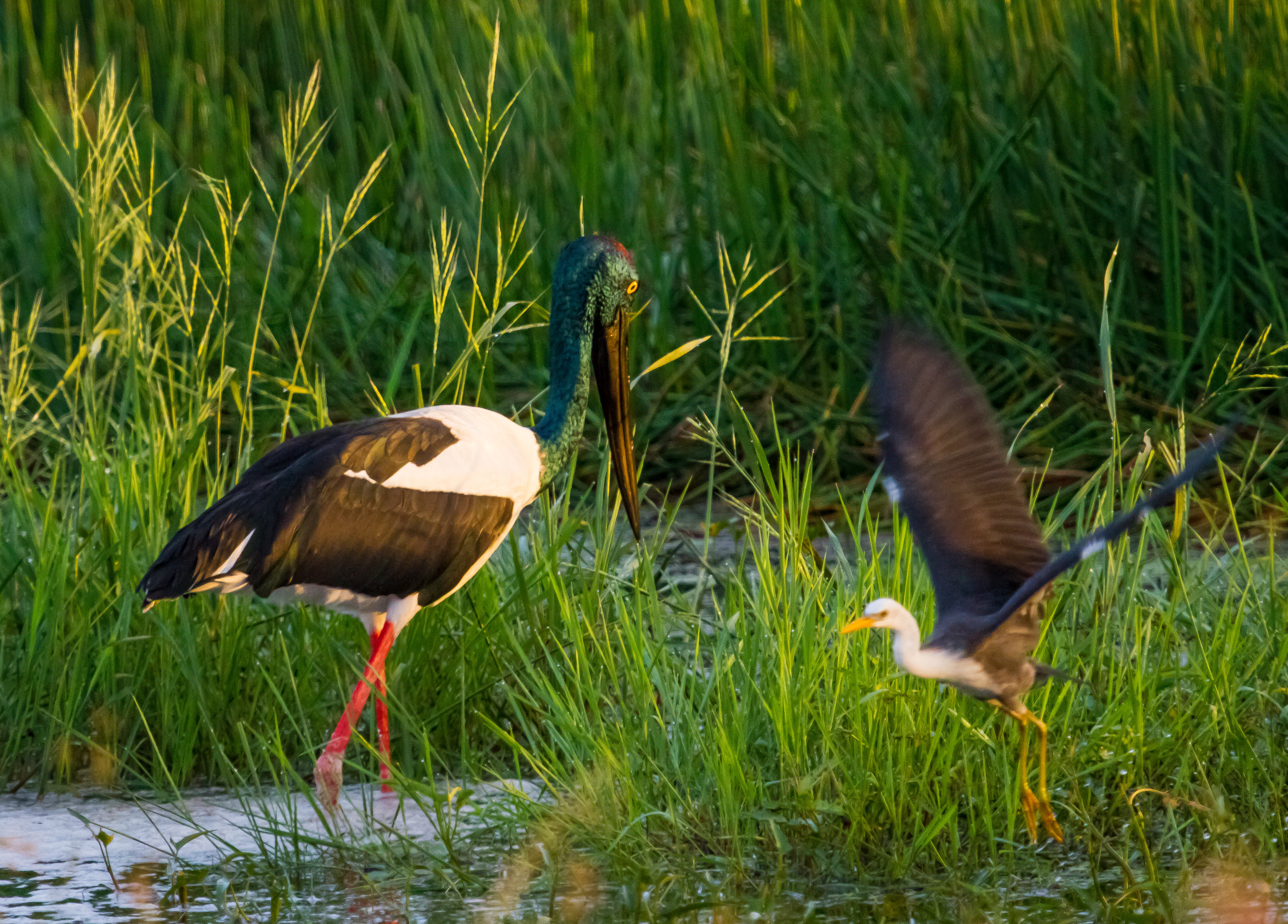
Black necked stork (jabiru) and juvenile pied heron in flight

Order: Ciconiiformes Family: Ciconiidae

| Common name | Binomial | Notes |
|---|---|---|
| Black-necked stork | Ephippiorhynchus asiaticus | |

== Frigatebirds ==
Order: Suliformes Family: Fregatidae

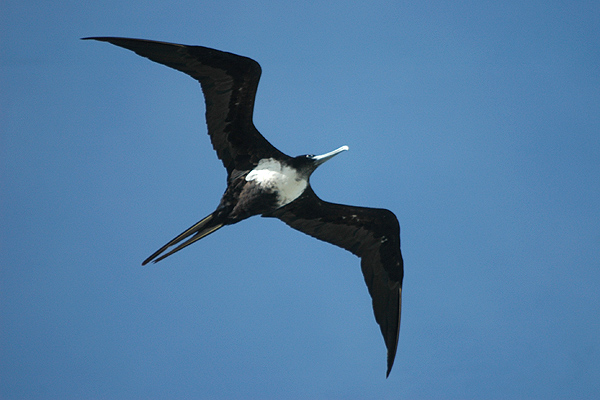
Great frigatebird

| Common name | Binomial | Notes |
|---|---|---|
| Lesser frigatebird | Fregata ariel | |
| Christmas Island frigatebird | Fregata andrewsi | (A) |
| Great frigatebird | Fregata minor | |

== Boobies and gannets ==
Order: Suliformes Family: Sulidae

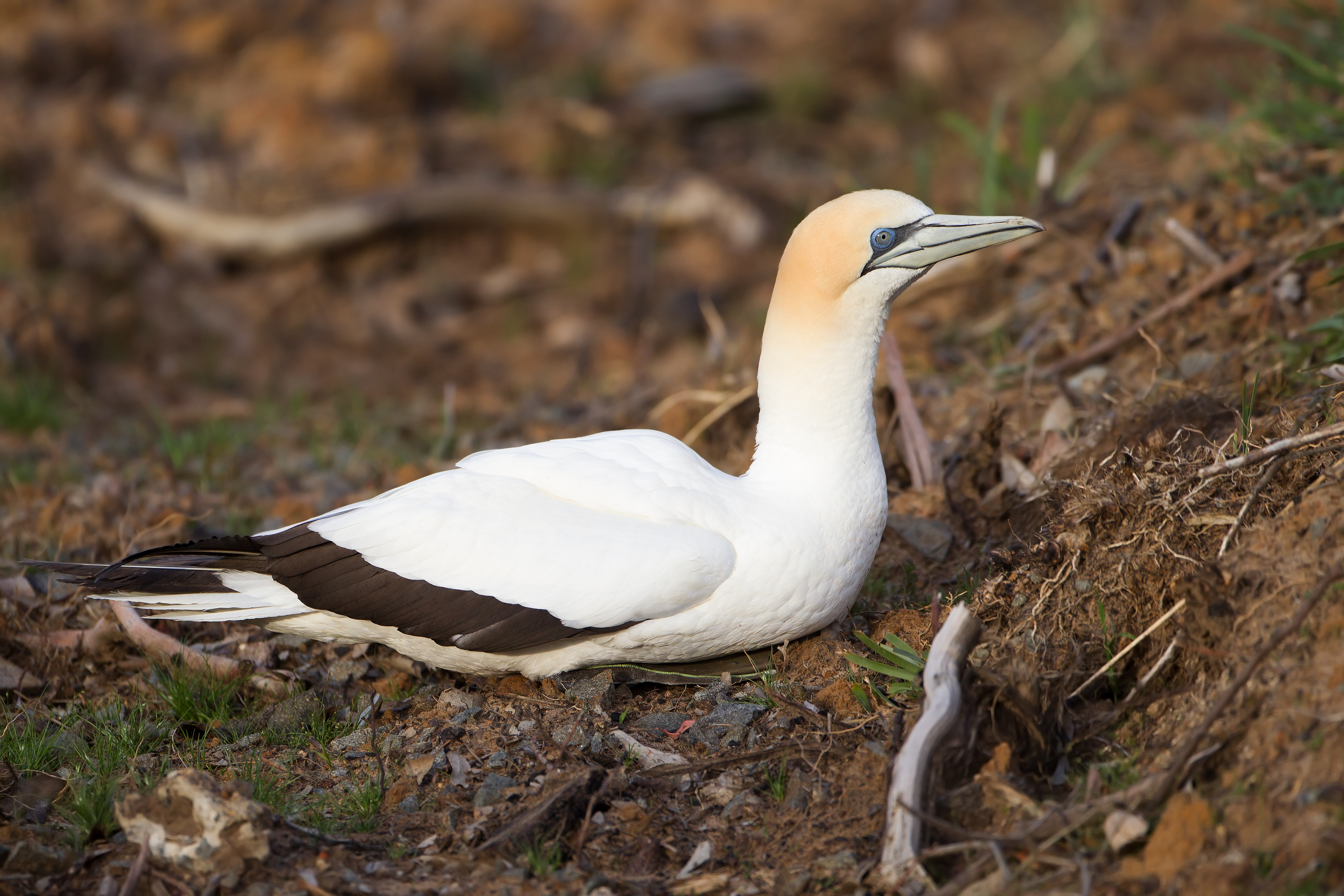
Australasian gannet

The sulids comprise the gannets and boobies. Both groups are medium-large coastal seabirds that plunge-dive for fish.

| Common name | Binomial | Notes |
|---|---|---|
| Masked booby | Sula dactylatra | |
| Brown booby | Sula leucogaster | |
| Red-footed booby | Sula sula | |
| Abbott's booby | Papasula abbotti | (A) |
| Cape gannet | Morus capensis | (A) |
| Australasian gannet | Morus serrator | |

== Anhingas ==
Order: Suliformes Family: Anhingidae

Anhingas or darters are cormorant-like water birds with long necks and long, straight bills. They are fish eaters which often swim with only their neck above the water.

| Common name | Binomial | Notes |
|---|---|---|
| Oriental darter | Anhinga melanogaster | (A) |
| Australasian darter | Anhinga novaehollandiae | |

== Cormorants and shags ==
Order: Suliformes Family: Phalacrocoracidae

Cormorants are medium-to-large aquatic birds, usually with mainly dark plumage and areas of coloured skin on the face. The bill is long, thin and sharply hooked. Their feet are four-toed and webbed, a distinguishing feature among the order Pelecaniformes.

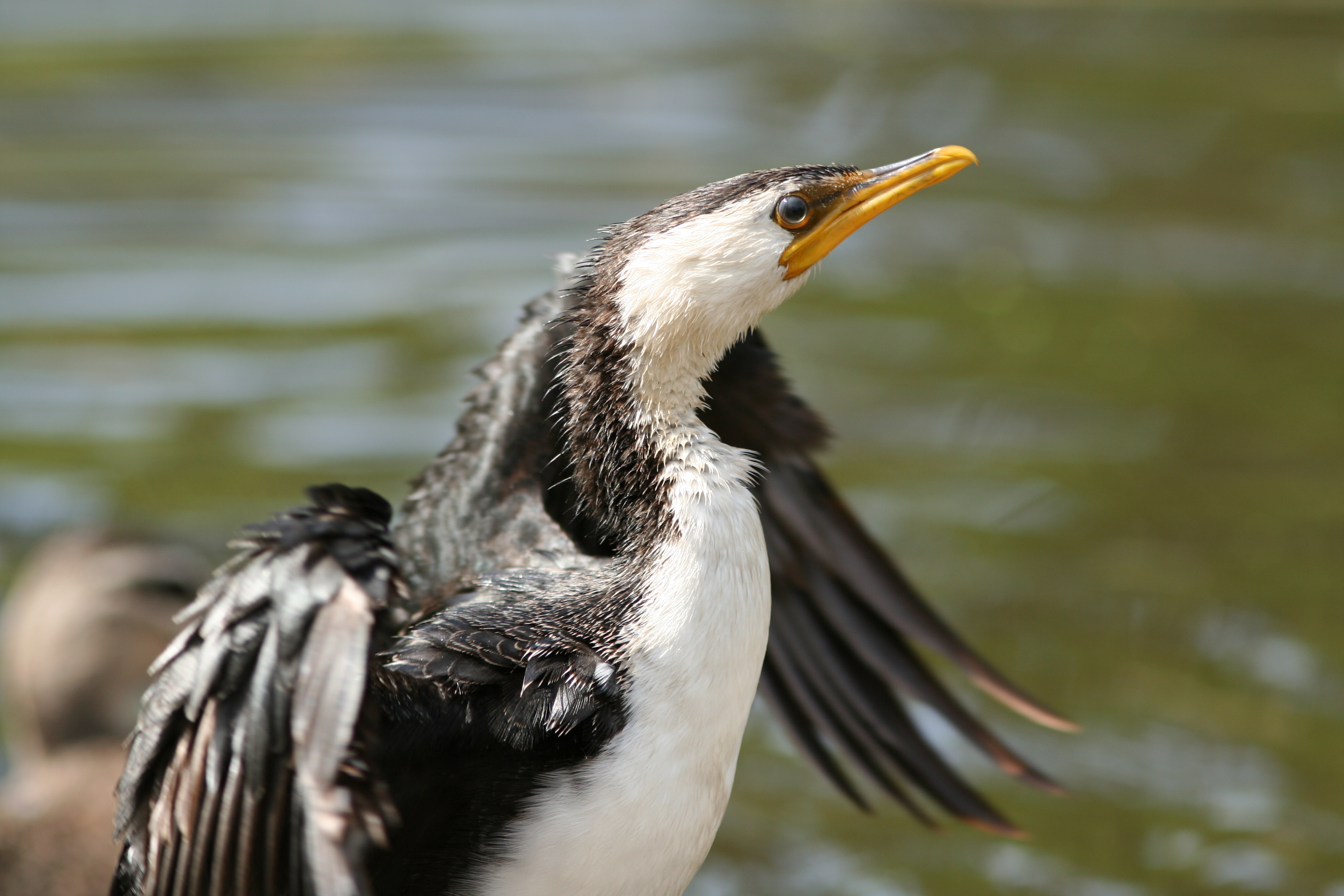
Little pied cormorant

| Common name | Binomial | Notes |
|---|---|---|
| Little pied cormorant | Microcarbo melanoleucos | |
| Great cormorant | Phalacrocorax carbo | |
| Little black cormorant | Phalacrocorax sulcirostris | |
| Pied cormorant | Phalacrocorax varius | |
| Black-faced cormorant | Phalacrocorax fuscescens | |
| Kerguelen shag | Leucocarbo verrucosus | (A) |

== Pelicans ==
Order: Pelecaniformes Family: Pelecanidae

Pelicans are large water birds with distinctive pouches under their bills. Like other birds in the order Pelecaniformes, they have four webbed toes.

| Common name | Binomial | Notes |
|---|---|---|
| Australian pelican | Pelecanus conspicillatus | |

== Herons, egrets, and bitterns ==
Order: Pelecaniformes Family: Ardeidae

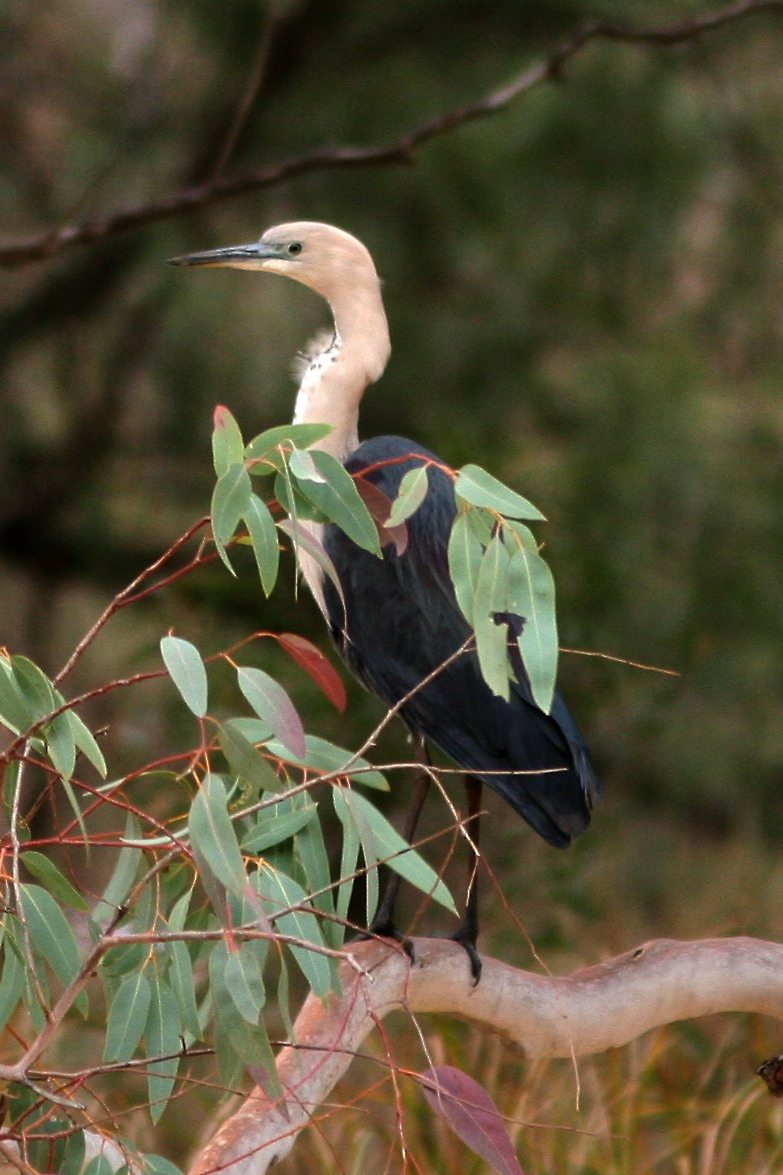
Pacific heron

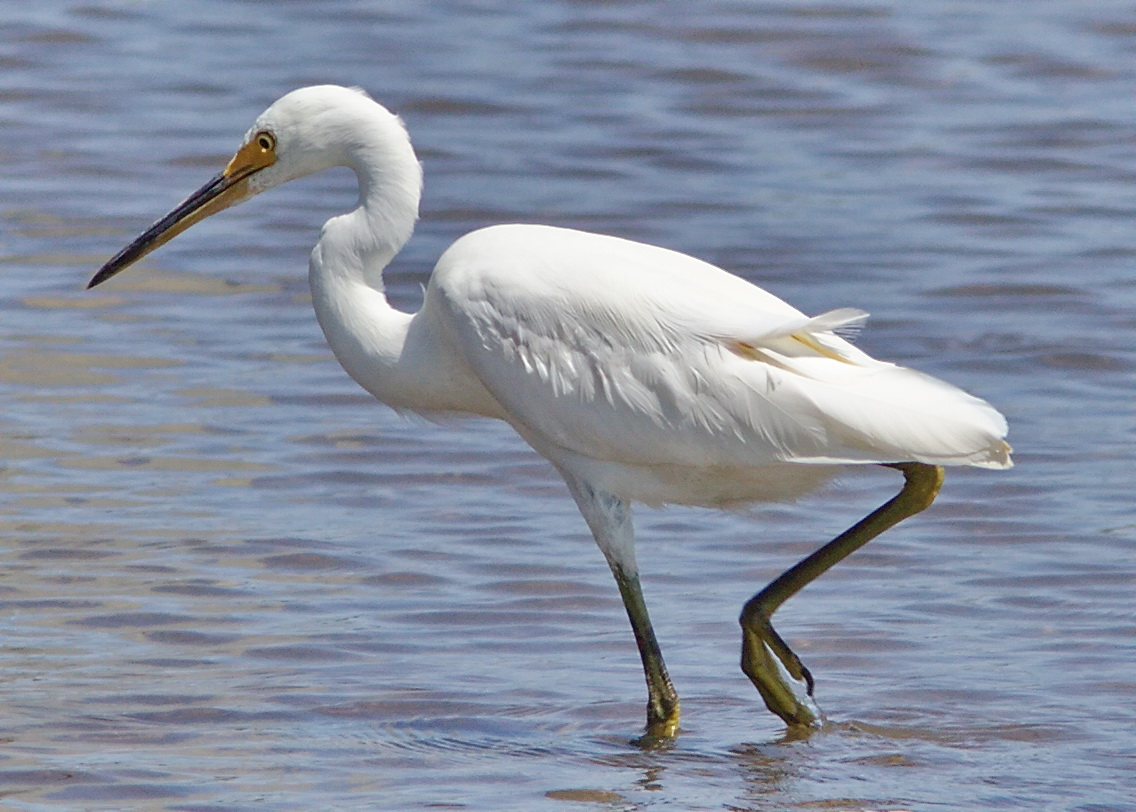
Australian little egret

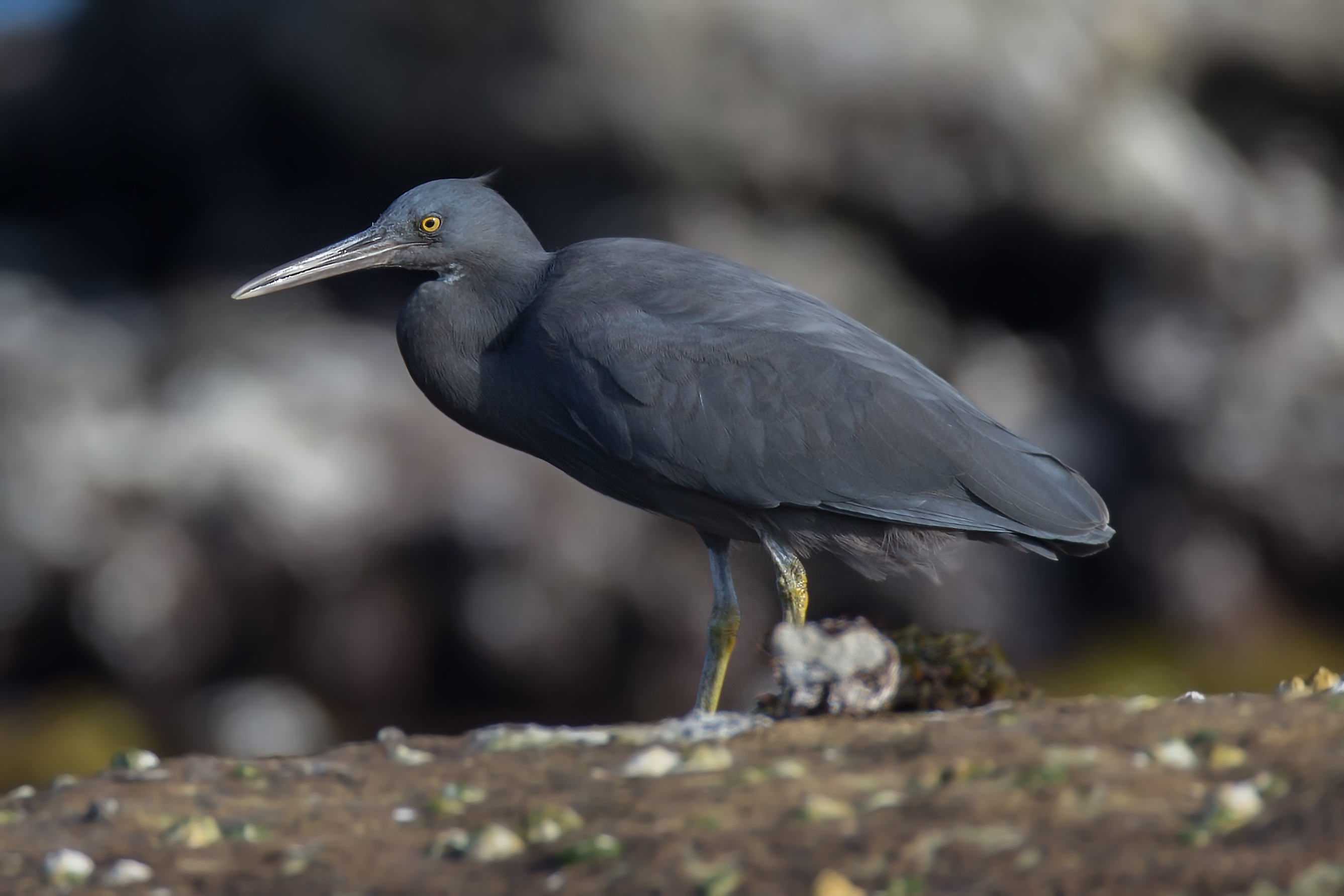
Pacific reef-heron, dark morph

| Common name | Binomial | Notes |
|---|---|---|
| Australasian bittern | Botaurus poiciloptilus | |
| Yellow bittern | Ixobrychus sinensis | (A) |
| Black-backed bittern | Ixobrychus dubius | |
| Cinnamon bittern | Ixobrychus cinnamomeus | (A) |
| Black bittern | Ixobrychus flavicollis | |
| Gray heron | Ardea cinerea | (A) |
| Pacific heron | Ardea pacifica | |
| Great-billed heron | Ardea sumatrana | |
| Purple heron | Ardea purpurea | (A) |
| Great egret | Ardea alba | |
| Intermediate egret | Ardea intermedia | |
| White-faced heron | Egretta novaehollandiae | |
| Little egret | Egretta garzetta | |
| Pacific reef-heron | Egretta sacra | |
| Pied heron | Egretta picata | |
| Cattle egret | Bubulcus ibis | |
| Chinese pond-heron | Ardeola bacchus | (A) |
| Striated heron | Butorides striatus | |
| Black-crowned night-heron | Nycticorax nycticorax | |
| Nankeen night-heron | Nycticorax caledonicus | |

== Ibises and spoonbills ==
Order: Pelecaniformes Family: Threskiornithidae

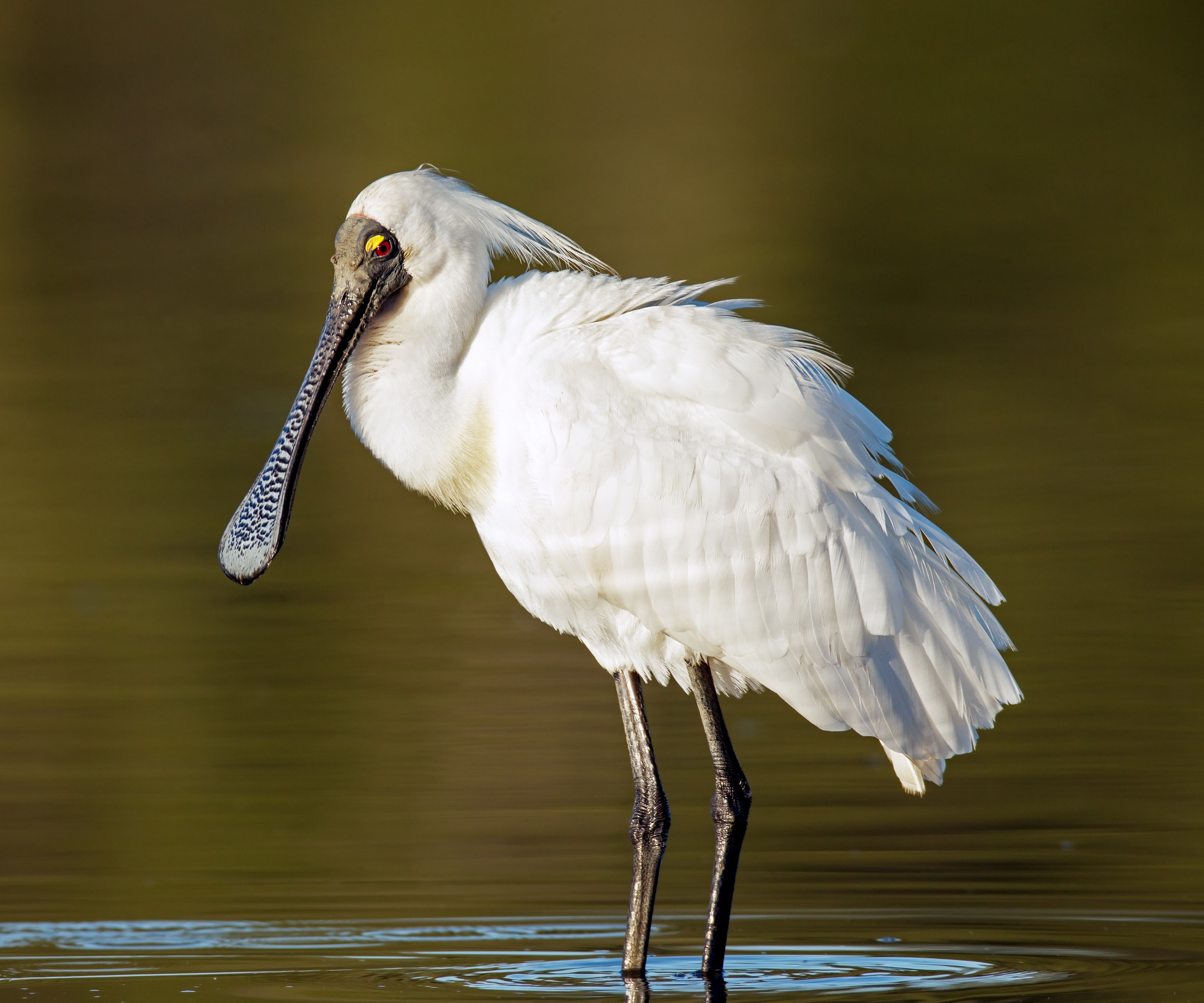
Royal spoonbill

| Common name | Binomial | Notes |
|---|---|---|
| Glossy ibis | Plegadis falcinellus | |
| Australian ibis | Threskiornis moluccus | |
| Straw-necked ibis | Threskiornis spinicollis | |
| Royal spoonbill | Platalea regia | |
| Yellow-billed spoonbill | Platalea flavipes | |

== Osprey ==
Order: Accipitriformes Family: Pandionidae

| Common name | Binomial | Notes |
|---|---|---|
| Osprey | Pandion haliaetus | |

== Hawks, eagles, and kites ==
Order: Accipitriformes Family: Accipitridae

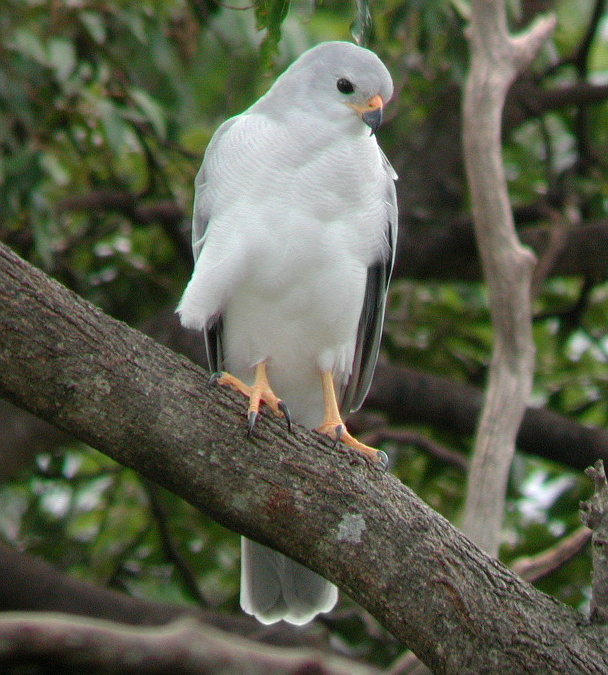
Gray goshawk

| Common name | Binomial | Notes |
|---|---|---|
| Black-shouldered kite | Elanus axillaris | |
| Letter-winged kite | Elanus scriptus | |
| Oriental honey-buzzard | Pernis ptilorhynchus | (A) |
| Black-breasted kite | Hamirostra melanosternon | |
| Square-tailed kite | Lophoictinia isura | |
| Pacific baza | Aviceda subcristata | |
| Little eagle | Hieraaetus morphnoides | |
| Wedge-tailed eagle | Aquila audax | |
| Swamp harrier | Circus approximans | |
| Spotted harrier | Circus assimilis | |
| Chinese sparrowhawk | Accipiter soloensis | |
| Gray goshawk | Accipiter novaehollandiae | |
| Brown goshawk | Accipiter fasciatus | |
| Japanese sparrowhawk | Accipiter gularis | |
| Collared sparrowhawk | Accipiter cirrocephalus | |
| Red goshawk | Erythrotriorchis radiatus | |
| Black kite | Milvus migrans | |
| Whistling kite | Haliastur sphenurus | |
| Brahminy kite | Haliastur indus | |
| White-bellied sea eagle | Haliaeetus leucogaster | |

== Barn owls ==
Order: Strigiformes Family: Tytonidae

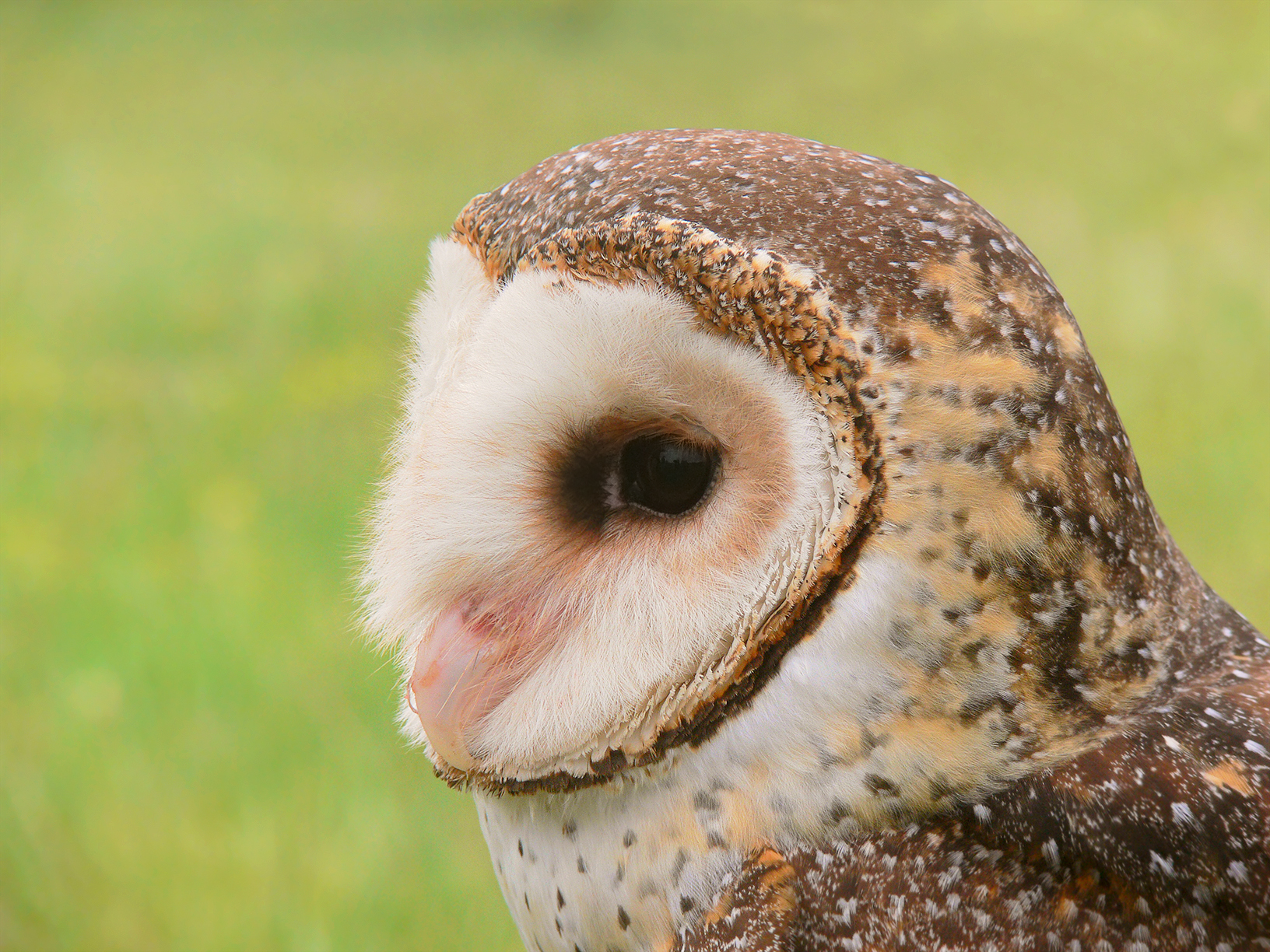
Australian masked-owl

| Common name | Binomial | Notes |
|---|---|---|
| Australian masked-owl | Tyto novaehollandiae | |
| Australian grass-owl | Tyto longimembris | |
| Barn owl | Tyto alba | |

== Owls ==
Order: Strigiformes Family: Strigidae

| Common name | Binomial | Notes |
|---|---|---|
| Oriental scops-owl | Otis sunia | (A) |
| Rufous owl | Ninox rufa | |
| Barking owl | Ninox connivens | |
| Southern boobook | Ninox boobook | |
| Brown boobook | Ninox scutulata | (A) |
| Northern boobook | Ninox japonica | (A) |

== Hoopoes ==
Order: Bucerotiformes Family: Upupidae

| Common name | Binomial | Notes |
|---|---|---|
| Eurasian hoopoe | Upupa epops | (A) |

== Kingfishers ==
Order: Coraciiformes Family: Alcedinidae

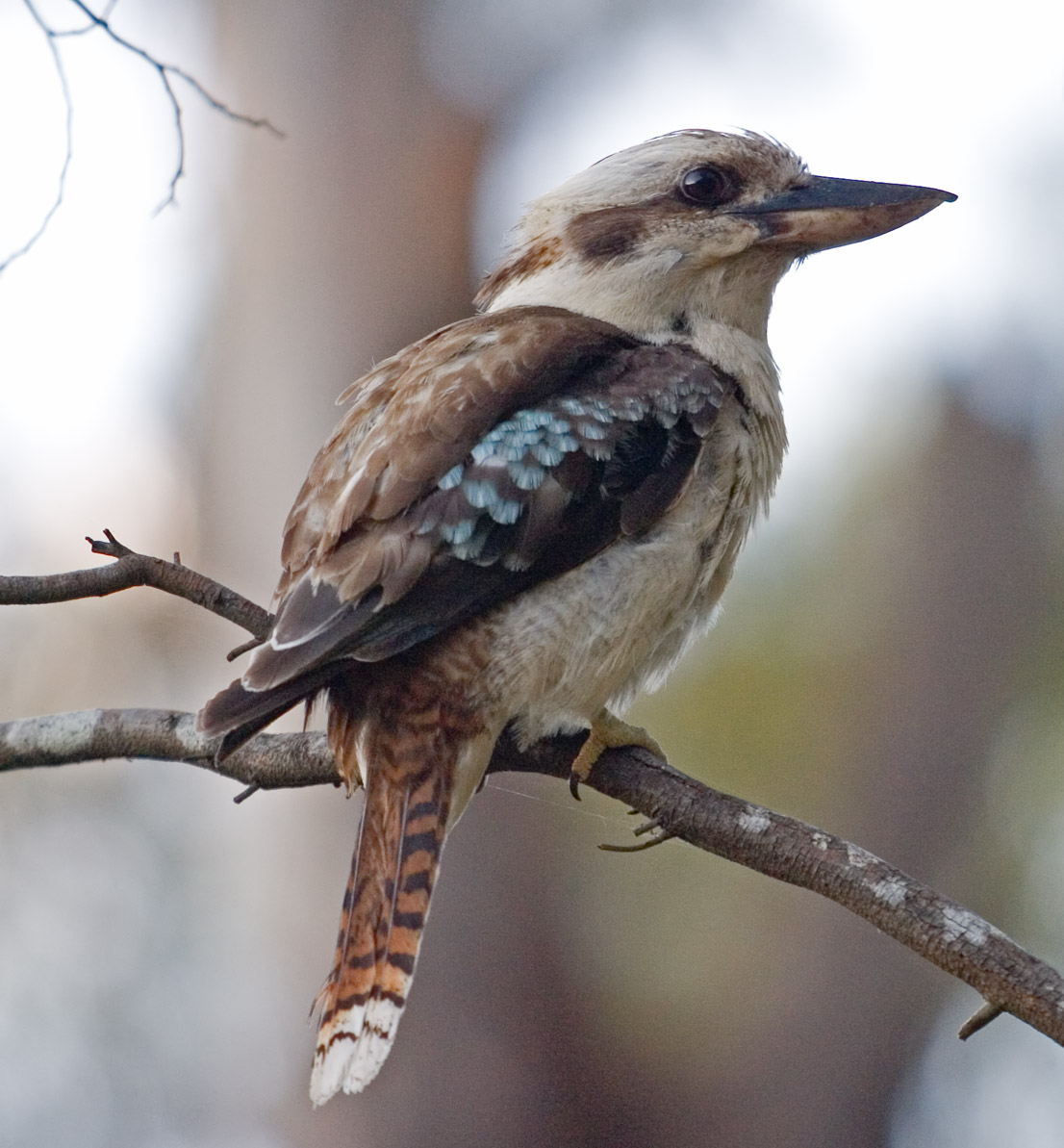
Laughing kookaburra

| Common name | Binomial | Notes |
|---|---|---|
| Azure kingfisher | Ceyx azureus | |
| Little kingfisher | Ceyx pusillus | (A) |
| Laughing kookaburra | Dacelo novaeguineae | (I) |
| Blue-winged kookaburra | Dacelo leachii | |
| Black-capped kingfisher | Halcyon pileata | (A) |
| Red-backed kingfisher | Todiramphus pyrrhopygia | |
| Forest kingfisher | Todiramphus macleayii | (A) |
| Torresian kingfisher | Todiramphus sordidus | |
| Sacred kingfisher | Todiramphus sanctus | |
| Collared kingfisher | Todiramphus chloris | (A) |

== Bee-eaters ==
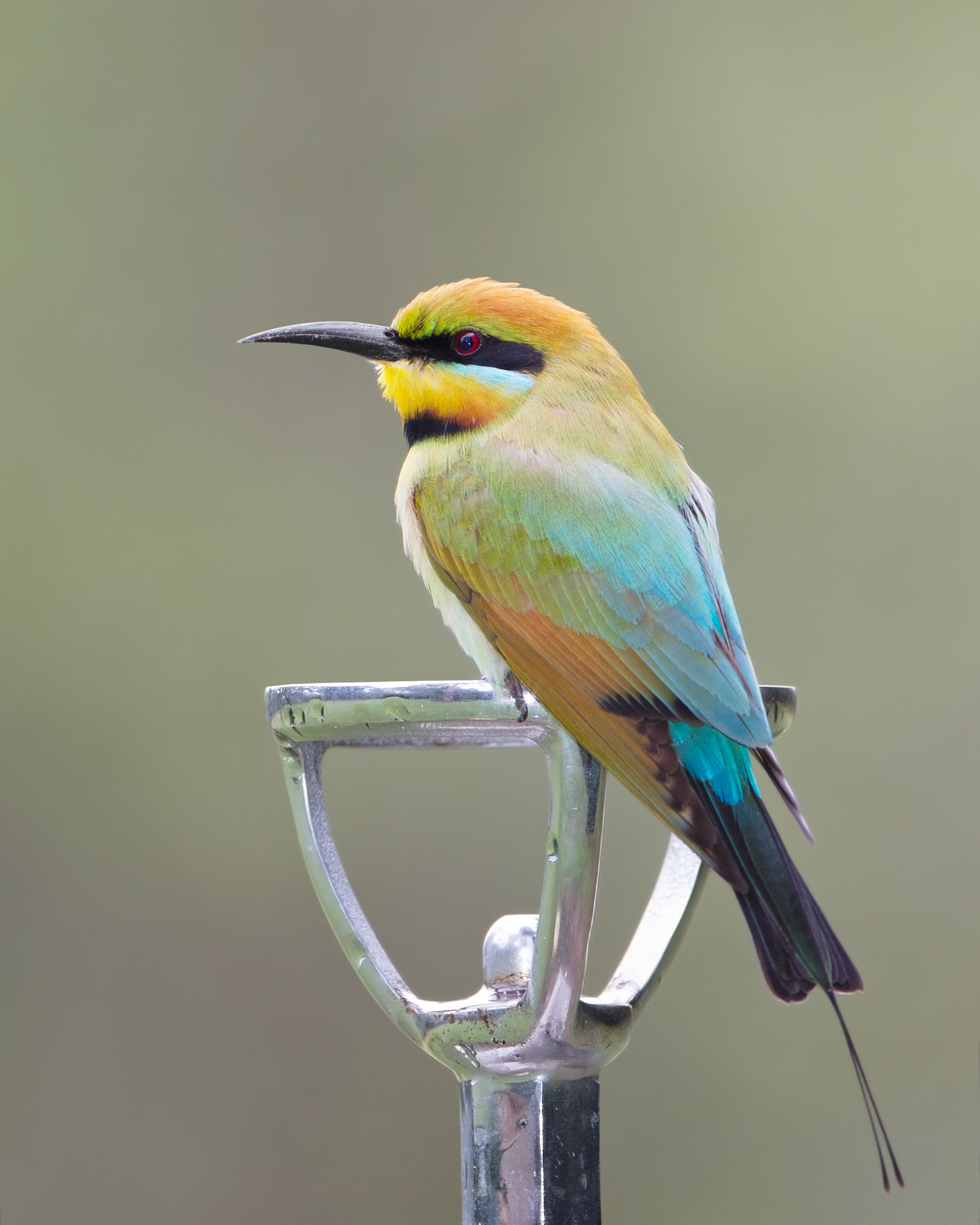
Rainbow bee-eater

Order: Coraciiformes Family: Meropidae

| Common name | Binomial | Notes |
|---|---|---|
| Rainbow bee-eater | Merops ornatus | |

== Rollers ==
Order: Coraciiformes Family: Coraciidae

| Common name | Binomial | Notes |
|---|---|---|
| Dollarbird | Eurystomus orientalis | |

== Falcons and caracaras ==
Order: Falconiformes Family: Falconidae

| Common name | Binomial | Notes |
|---|---|---|
| Nankeen kestrel | Falco cenchroides | |
| Eurasian hobby | Falco subbuteo | (A) |
| Australian hobby | Falco longipennis | |
| Brown falcon | Falco berigora | |
| Gray falcon | Falco hypoleucos | |
| Black falcon | Falco subniger | |
| Peregrine falcon | Falco peregrinus | |

== Cockatoos ==
Order: Psittaciformes Family: Cacatuidae

| Common name | Binomial | Notes |
|---|---|---|
| Red-tailed black-cockatoo | Calyptorhynchus banksii | |
| Carnaby's black-cockatoo | Calyptorhynchus latirostris | (E) |
| Baudin's black-cockatoo | Calyptorhynchus baudinii | (E) |
| Pink cockatoo | Lophochroa leadbeateri | |
| Galah | Eolophus roseicapilla | |
| Long-billed corella | Cacatua tenuirostris | (I) |
| Western corella | Cacatua pastinator | (E) |
| Little corella | Cacatua sanguinea | |
| Sulphur-crested cockatoo | Cacatua galerita | |
| Cockatiel | Nymphicus hollandicus | |

== Old World parrots ==
Order: Psittaciformes Family: Psittaculidae

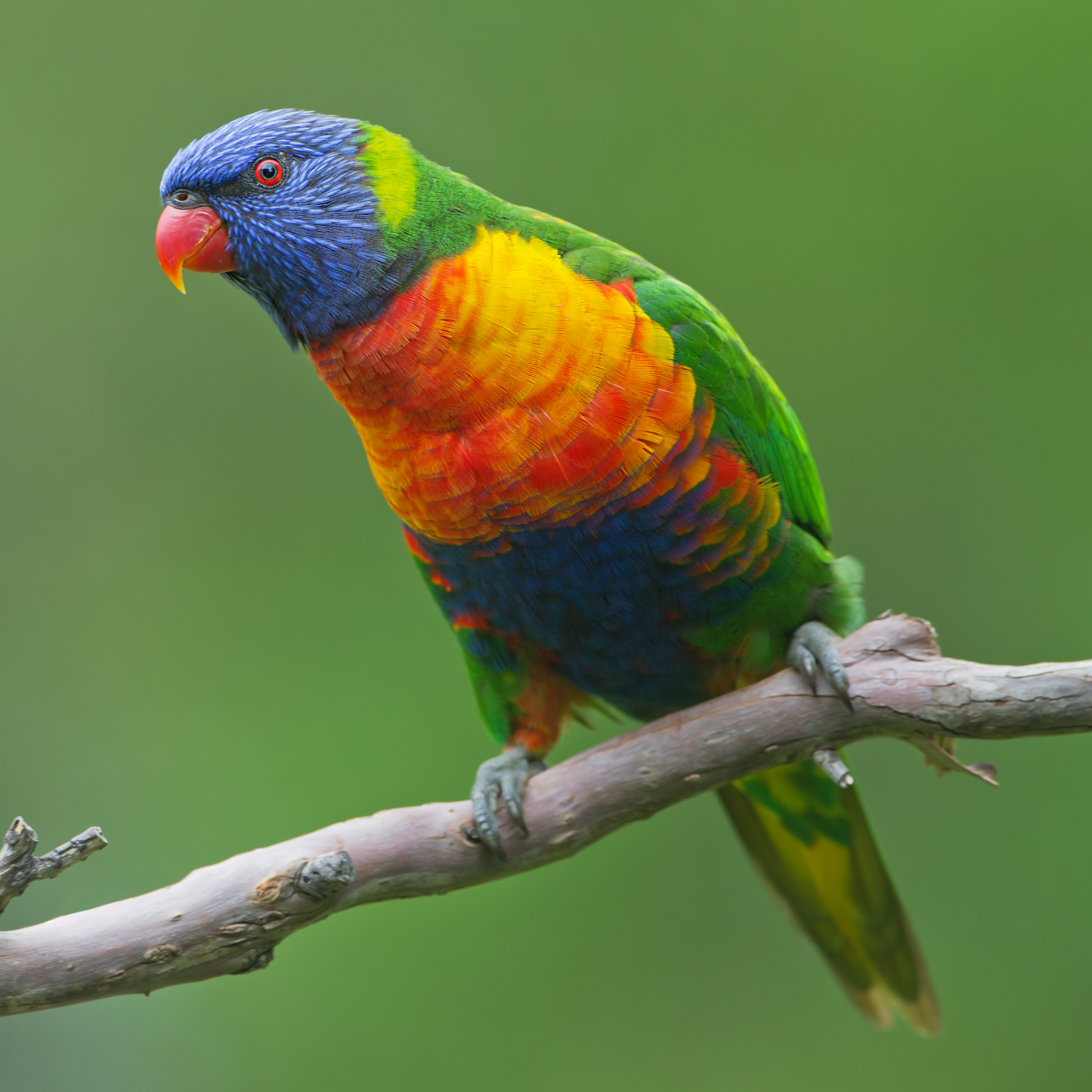
Rainbow lorikeet

| Common name | Binomial | Notes |
|---|---|---|
| Regent parrot | Polytelis anthopeplus | |
| Princess parrot | Polytelis alexandrae | |
| Red-winged parrot | Aprosmictus erythropterus | |
| Ground parrot | Pezoporus wallicus | |
| Night parrot | Pezoporus occidentalis | |
| Bourke's parrot | Neopsephotus bourkii | |
| Elegant parrot | Neophema elegans | |
| Rock parrot | Neophema petrophila | |
| Scarlet-chested parrot | Neophema splendida | |
| Australian ringneck | Barnardius zonarius | |
| Northern rosella | Platycercus venustus | |
| Western rosella | Platycercus icterotis | (E) |
| Naretha bluebonnet | Northiella narethae | |
| Mulga parrot | Psephotus varius | |
| Red-capped parrot | Purpureicephalus spurius | (E) |
| Budgerigar | Melopsittacus undulatus | |
| Purple-crowned lorikeet | Parvipsitta porphyrocephala | |
| Varied lorikeet | Psitteuteles versicolor | |
| Red-collared lorikeet | Trichoglossus rubritorquis | |
| Rainbow lorikeet | Trichoglossus haematodus | (I) |

== Pittas ==
Order: Passeriformes Family: Pittidae

| Common name | Binomial | Notes |
|---|---|---|
| Blue-winged pitta | Pitta moluccensis | (A) |
| Fairy pitta | Pitta nympha | (A) |
| Hooded pitta | Pitta sordida | (A) |
| Rainbow pitta | Pitta iris | |

== Scrub-birds ==
Order: Passeriformes Family: Atrichornithidae

| Common name | Binomial | Notes |
|---|---|---|
| Noisy scrub-bird | Atrichornis clamosus | (E) |

== Bowerbirds ==
Order: Passeriformes Family: Ptilonorhynchidae

| Common name | Binomial | Notes |
|---|---|---|
| Western bowerbird | Ptilonorhynchus guttatus | |
| Great bowerbird | Ptilonorhynchus nuchalis | |

== Australasian treecreepers ==
Order: Passeriformes Family: Climacteridae

| Common name | Binomial | Notes |
|---|---|---|
| White-browed treecreeper | Climacteris affinis | |
| Black-tailed treecreeper | Climacteris melanura | |
| Rufous treecreeper | Climacteris rufa | |

== Fairywrens ==
Order: Passeriformes Family: Maluridae

| Common name | Binomial | Notes |
|---|---|---|
| Rufous grasswren | Amytornis whitei | |
| Striated grasswren | Amytornis striatus | |
| Short-tailed grasswren | Amytornis merrotsyi | |
| Western grasswren | Amytornis textilis | |
| Black grasswren | Amytornis housei | (E) |
| Dusky grasswren | Amytornis purnelli | |
| Southern emuwren | Stipiturus malachurus | |
| Rufous-crowned emuwren | Stipiturus ruficeps | |
| Purple-crowned fairywren | Malurus coronatus | |
| Red-winged fairywren | Malurus elegans | (E) |
| Blue-breasted fairywren | Malurus pulcherrimus | |
| Purple-backed fairywren | Malurus assimilis | |
| Splendid fairywren | Malurus splendens | |
| White-winged fairywren | Malurus leucopterus | |
| Red-backed fairywren | Malurus melanocephalus | |

== Honeyeaters ==
Order: Passeriformes Family: Meliphagidae

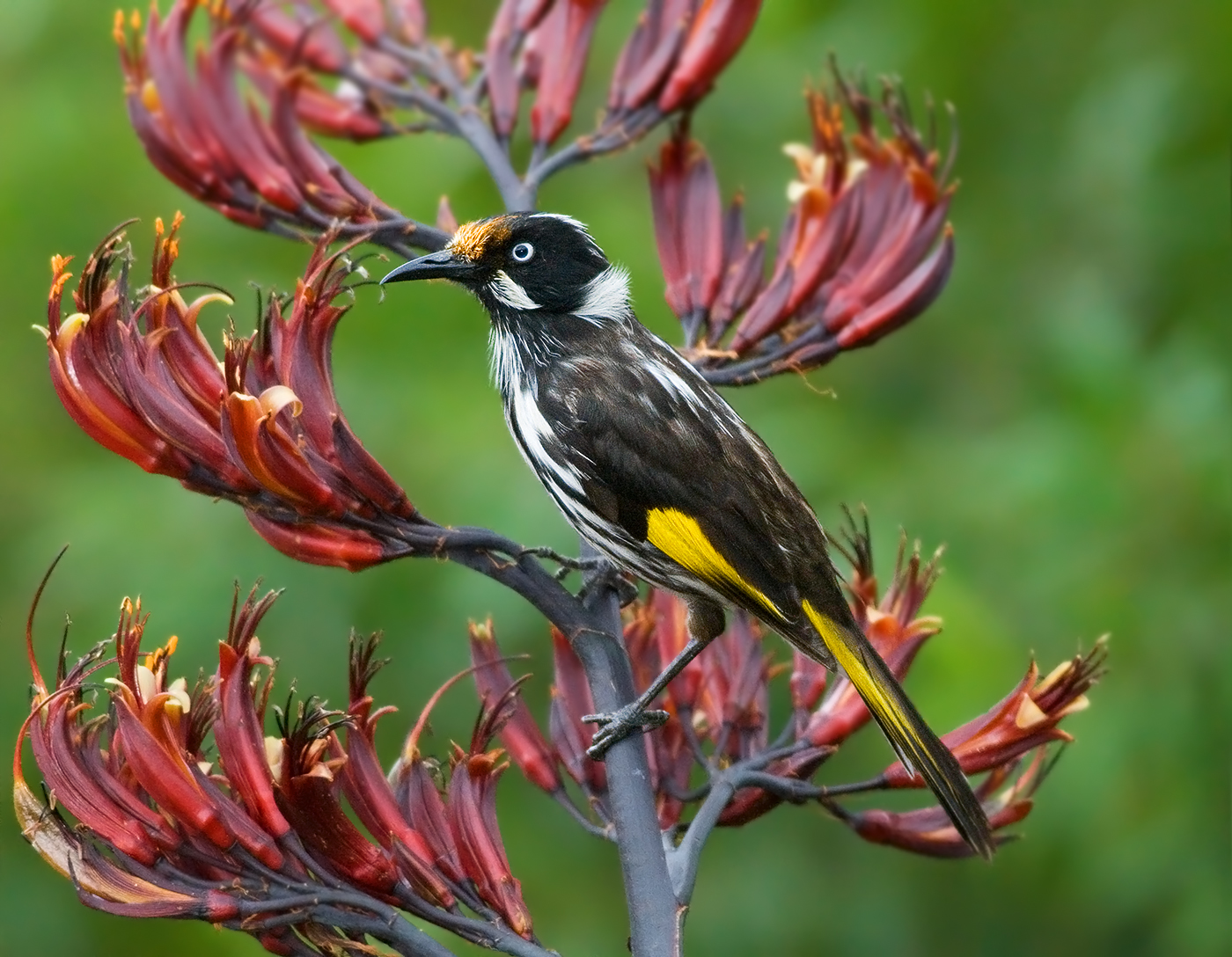
New Holland honeyeater

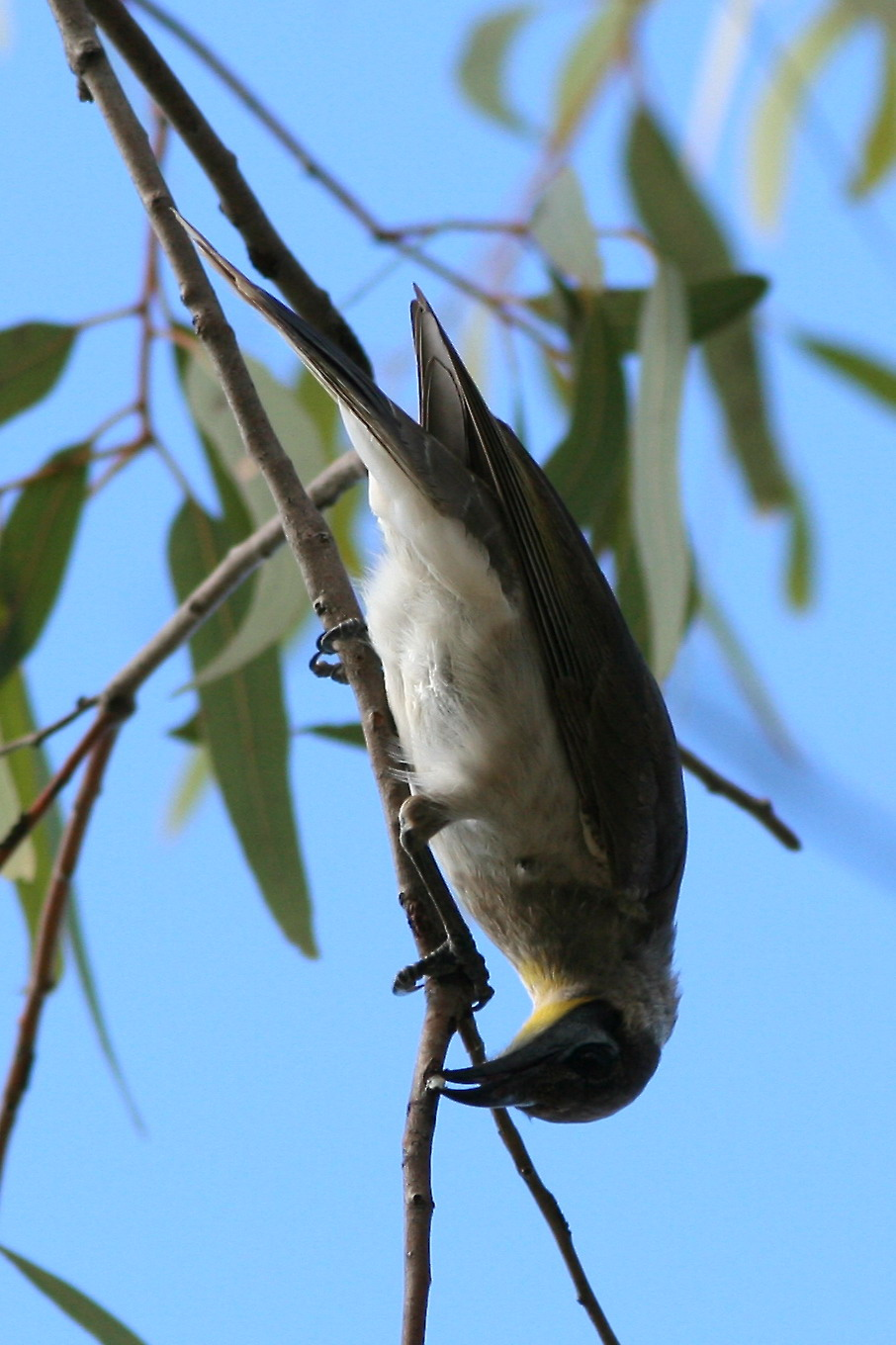
Little friarbird

| Common name | Binomial | Notes |
|---|---|---|
| Western spinebill | Acanthorhynchus superciliosus | (E) |
| Pied honeyeater | Certhionyx variegatus | |
| Kimberley honeyeater | Territornis fordiana | (E) |
| White-gaped honeyeater | Stomiopera unicolor | |
| White-fronted honeyeater | Purnella albifrons | |
| Purple-gaped honeyeater | Lichenostomus cratitius | |
| Yellow-throated miner | Manorina flavigula | |
| Spiny-cheeked honeyeater | Acanthagenys rufogularis | |
| Western wattlebird | Anthochaera lunulata | (E) |
| Red wattlebird | Anthochaera carunculata | |
| Singing honeyeater | Gavicalis virescens | |
| Yellow-plumed honeyeater | Ptilotula ornata | |
| White-plumed honeyeater | Ptilotula penicillata | |
| Yellow-tinted honeyeater | Ptilotula flavescens | |
| Gray-headed honeyeater | Ptilotula keartlandi | |
| Gray-fronted honeyeater | Ptilotula plumula | |
| Bar-breasted honeyeater | Ramsayornis fasciatus | |
| Rufous-throated honeyeater | Conopophila rufogularis | |
| Gray honeyeater | Conopophila whitei | |
| Gibber chat | Ashbyia lovensis | (A) |
| Yellow chat | Epthianura crocea | |
| Crimson chat | Epthianura tricolor | |
| Orange chat | Epthianura aurifrons | |
| White-fronted chat | Epthianura albifrons | |
| Black honeyeater | Sugomel nigrum | |
| Dusky myzomela | Myzomela obscura | (A) |
| Red-headed myzomela | Myzomela erythrocephala | |
| Tawny-crowned honeyeater | Gliciphila melanops | |
| Banded honeyeater | Cissomela pectoralis | |
| Brown honeyeater | Lichmera indistincta | |
| New Holland honeyeater | Phylidonyris novaehollandiae | |
| White-cheeked honeyeater | Phylidonyris nigra | |
| White-eared honeyeater | Nesoptilotis leucotis | |
| Blue-faced honeyeater | Entomyzon cyanotis | |
| White-throated honeyeater | Melithreptus albogularis | |
| Gilbert's honeyeater | Melithreptus chloropsis | (E) |
| Brown-headed honeyeater | Melithreptus brevirostris | |
| Black-chinned honeyeater | Melithreptus gularis | |
| Painted honeyeater | Grantiella picta | (A) |
| Little friarbird | Philemon citreogularis | |
| Silver-crowned friarbird | Philemon argenticeps | |

== Bristlebirds ==
Order: Passeriformes Family: Dasyornithidae

| Common name | Binomial | Notes |
|---|---|---|
| Western bristlebird | Dasyornis longirostris | (E) |
| Rufous bristlebird | Dasyornis broadbenti | |

== Pardalotes ==
Order: Passeriformes Family: Pardalotidae

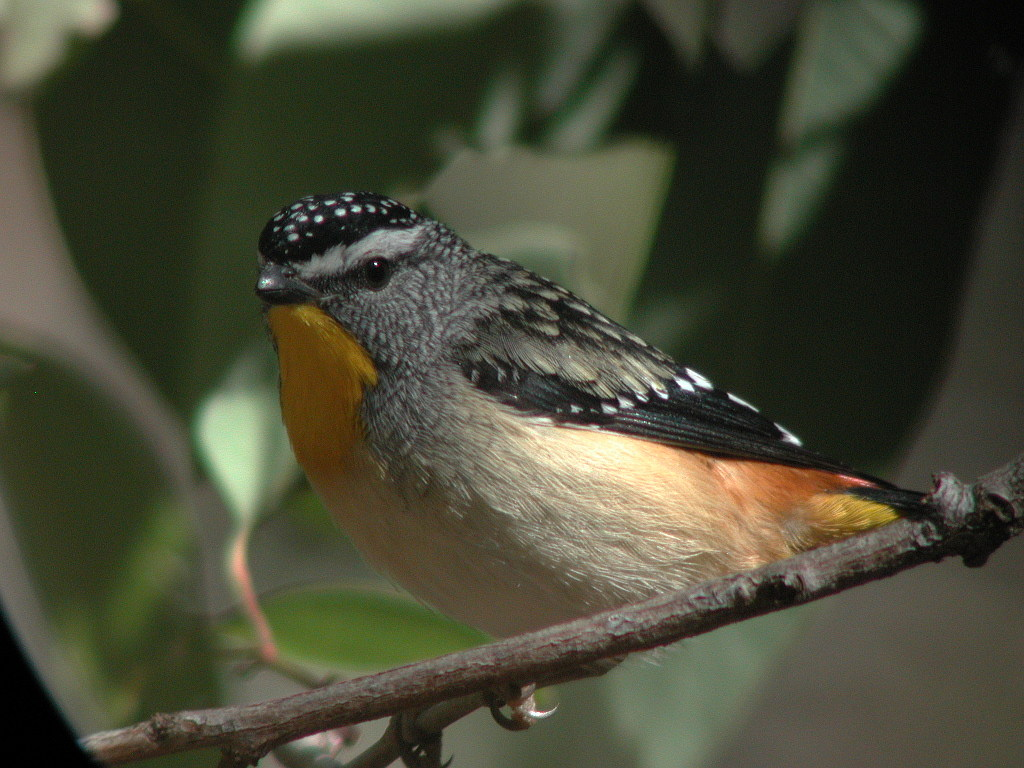
Spotted pardalote

| Common name | Binomial | Notes |
|---|---|---|
| Spotted pardalote | Pardalotus punctatus | |
| Red-browed pardalote | Pardalotus rubricatus | |
| Striated pardalote | Pardalotus striatus | |

== Thornbills and allies ==
Order: Passeriformes Family: Acanthizidae

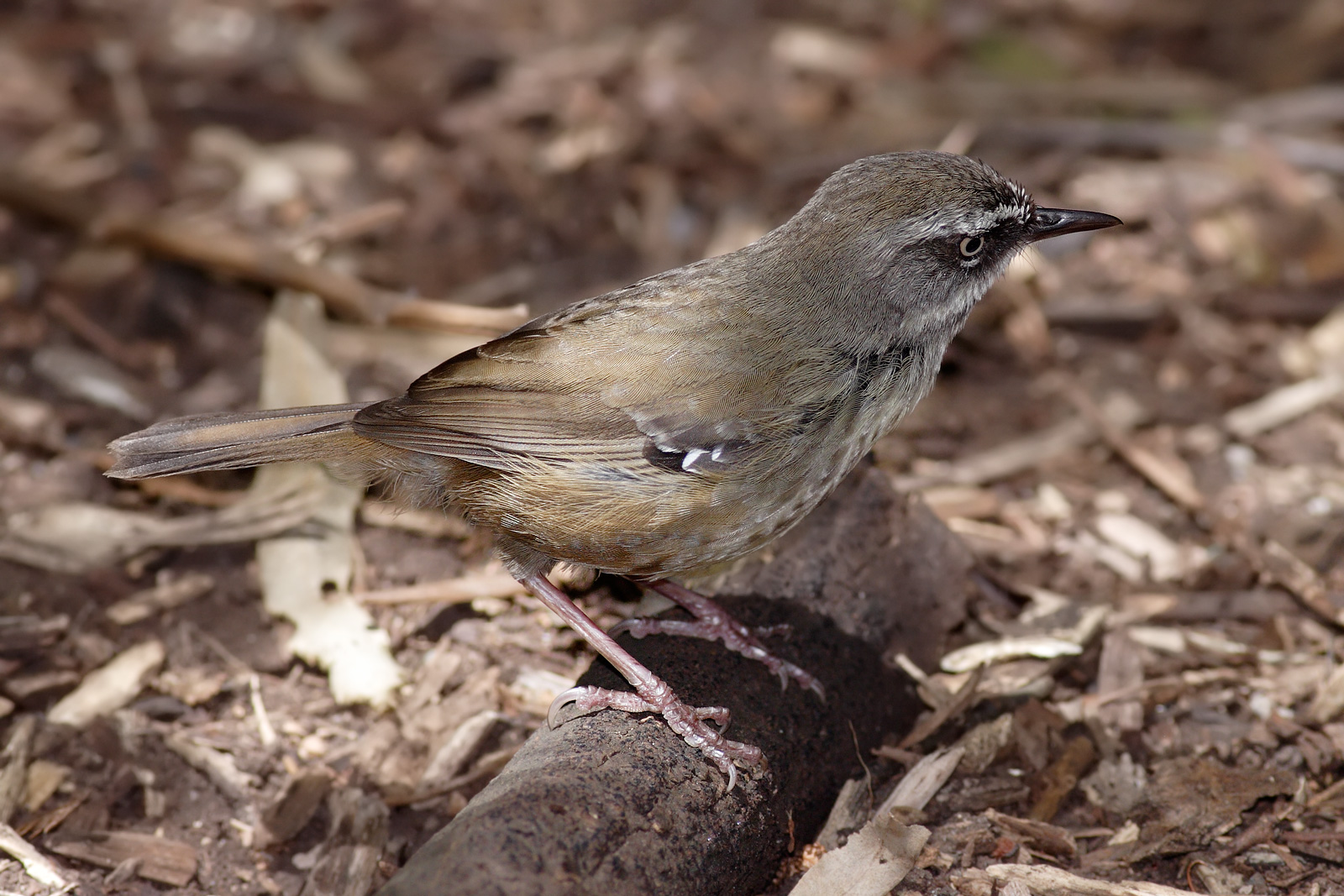
White-browed scrubwren

| Common name | Binomial | Notes |
|---|---|---|
| White-browed scrubwren | Sericornis frontalis | |
| Spotted scrubwren | Sericornis maculatus | |
| Redthroat | Pyrrholaemus brunneus | |
| Western fieldwren | Calamanthus montanellus | (E) |
| Rufous fieldwren | Calamanthus campestris | |
| Shy heathwren | Hylacola cauta | |
| Western thornbill | Acanthiza inornata | (E) |
| Slender-billed thornbill | Acanthiza iredalei | |
| Inland thornbill | Acanthiza apicalis | |
| Yellow-rumped thornbill | Acanthiza chrysorrhoa | |
| Chestnut-rumped thornbill | Acanthiza uropygialis | |
| Slaty-backed thornbill | Acanthiza robustirostris | |
| Weebill | Smicrornis brevirostris | |
| Green-backed gerygone | Gerygone chloronota | |
| White-throated gerygone | Gerygone albogularis | |
| Large-billed gerygone | Gerygone magnirostris | |
| Dusky gerygone | Gerygone tenebrosa | (E) |
| Western gerygone | Gerygone fusca | |
| Mangrove gerygone | Gerygone levigaster | |
| Southern whiteface | Aphelocephala leucopsis | |
| Banded whiteface | Aphelocephala nigricincta | |

== Pseudo-babblers ==
Order: Passeriformes Family: Pomatostomidae

| Common name | Binomial | Notes |
|---|---|---|
| Gray-crowned babbler | Pomatostomus temporalis | |
| White-browed babbler | Pomatostomus superciliosus | |

== Quail-thrushes and jewel-babblers ==
Order: Passeriformes Family: Cinclosomatidae

| Common name | Binomial | Notes |
|---|---|---|
| Chestnut quail-thrush | Cinclosoma castanotum | |
| Copperback quail-thrush | Cinclosoma clarum | |
| Western quail-thrush | Cinclosoma marginatum | |
| Nullarbor quail-thrush | Cinclosoma alisteri | |

== Cuckooshrikes ==
Order: Passeriformes Family: Campephagidae

| Common name | Binomial | Notes |
|---|---|---|
| Ground cuckooshrike | Coracina maxima | |
| Black-faced cuckooshrike | Coracina novaehollandiae | |
| White-bellied cuckooshrike | Coracina papuensis | |
| White-winged triller | Lalage sueurii | |
| Varied triller | Lalage leucomela | |
| Common cicadabird | Edolisoma tenuirostre | |

== Sittellas ==
Order: Passeriformes Family: Neosittidae

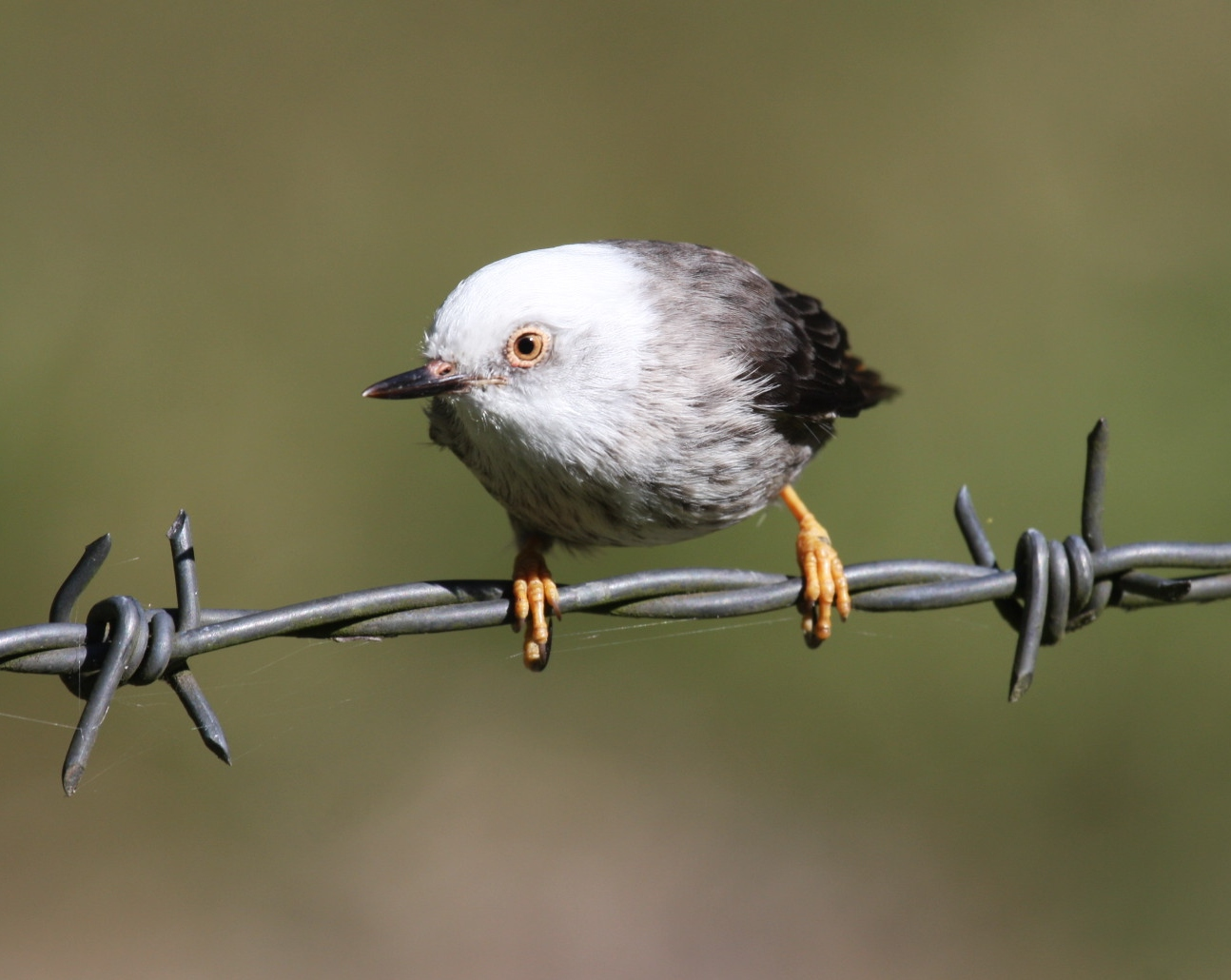
Varied sittella

| Common name | Binomial | Notes |
|---|---|---|
| Varied sittella | Daphoenositta chrysoptera | |

== Whipbirds and wedgebills ==
Order: Passeriformes Family: Psophodidae

| Common name | Binomial | Notes |
|---|---|---|
| Western whipbird | Psophodes nigrogularis | (E) |
| Chiming wedgebill | Psophodes occidentalis | |

== Australo-Papuan bellbirds ==
Order: Passeriformes Family: Oreoicidae

| Common name | Binomial | Notes |
|---|---|---|
| Crested bellbird | Oreoica gutturalis | |

== Shrike-tits ==
Order: Passeriformes Family: Falcunculidae

| Common name | Binomial | Notes |
|---|---|---|
| Western shrike-tit | Falcunculus leucogaster | |
| Northern shrike-tit | Falcunculus whitei | |

== Whistlers and allies ==
Order: Passeriformes Family: Pachycephalidae

| Common name | Binomial | Notes |
|---|---|---|
| Sandstone shrikethrush | Colluricincla woodwardi | |
| Gray shrikethrush | Colluricincla harmonica | |
| Arafura shrikethrush | Colluricincla megarhyncha | |
| Gilbert's whistler | Pachycephala inornata | |
| Western whistler | Pachycephala fuliginosa | (E) |
| Black-tailed whistler | Pachycephala melanura | |
| Rufous whistler | Pachycephala rufiventris | |
| White-breasted whistler | Pachycephala lanioides | |

== Old World orioles ==
Order: Passeriformes Family: Oriolidae

| Common name | Binomial | Notes |
|---|---|---|
| Green oriole | Oriolus flavocinctus | |
| Olive-backed oriole | Oriolus sagittatus | |
| Australasian figbird | Sphecotheres vieilloti | |

== Woodswallows, bellmagpies, and allies ==
Order: Passeriformes Family: Artamidae

| Common name | Binomial | Notes |
|---|---|---|
| White-breasted woodswallow | Artamus leucorynchus | |
| Masked woodswallow | Artamus personatus | |
| White-browed woodswallow | Artamus superciliosus | |
| Black-faced woodswallow | Artamus cinereus | |
| Dusky woodswallow | Artamus cyanopterus | |
| Little woodswallow | Artamus minor | |
| Gray butcherbird | Cracticus torquatus | |
| Silver-backed butcherbird | Cracticus argenteus | |
| Pied butcherbird | Cracticus nigrogularis | |
| Black butcherbird | Cracticus quoyi | |
| Australian magpie | Gymnorhina tibicen | |
| Gray currawong | Strepera versicolor | |

== Fantails ==
Order: Passeriformes Family: Rhipiduridae

| Common name | Binomial | Notes |
|---|---|---|
| Northern fantail | Rhipidura rufiventris | |
| Willie-wagtail | Rhipidura leucophrys | |
| Arafura fantail | Rhipidura dryas | |
| Gray fantail | Rhipidura albiscapa | |
| Mangrove fantail | Rhipidura phasiana | |

== Drongos ==
Order: Passeriformes Family: Dicruridae

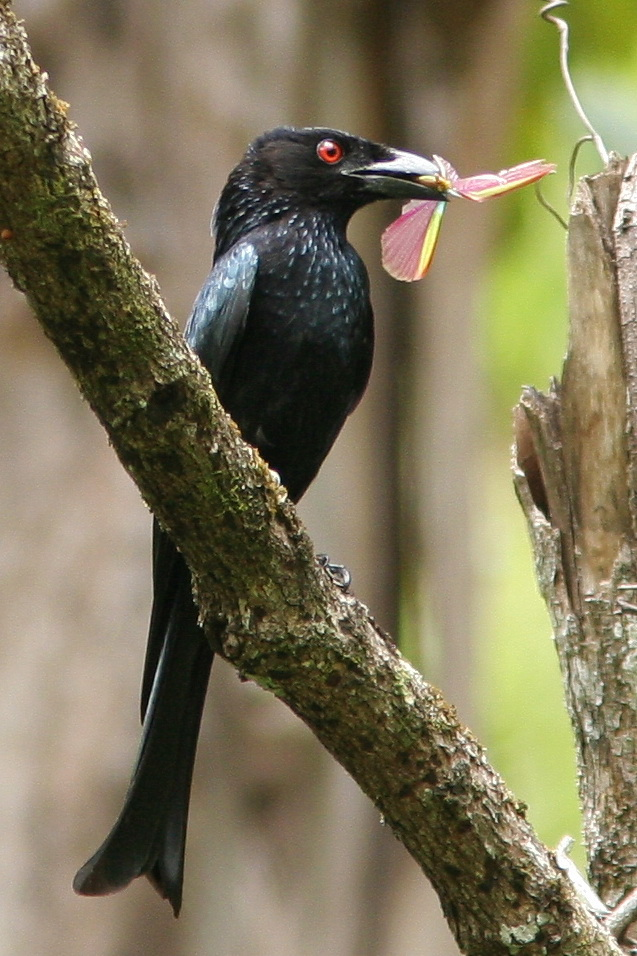
Spangled drongo

| Common name | Binomial | Notes |
|---|---|---|
| Spangled drongo | Dicrurus bracteatus | |

== Monarch flycatchers ==
Order: Passeriformes Family: Monarchidae

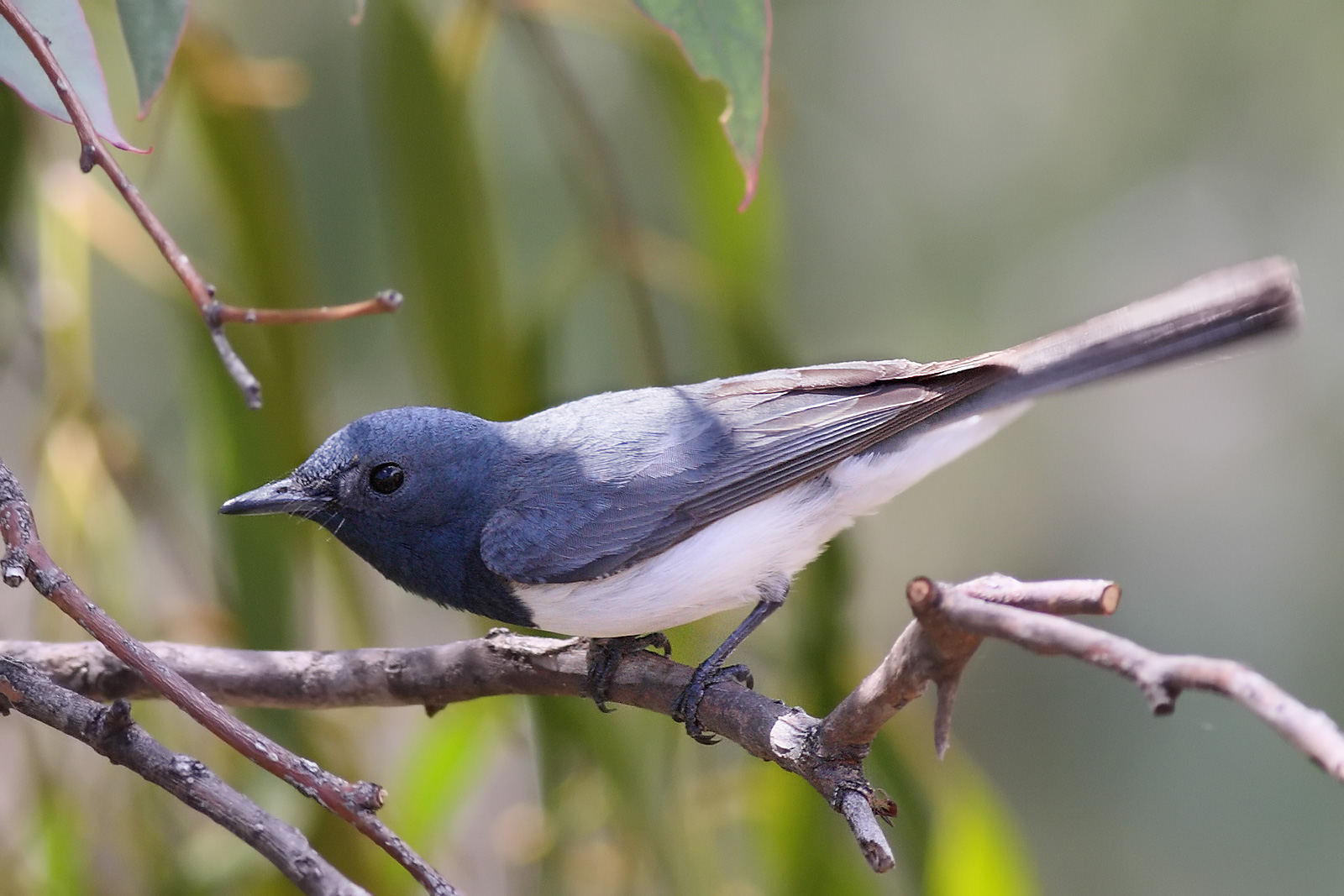
Leaden flycatcher

| Common name | Binomial | Notes |
|---|---|---|
| Island monarch | Monarcha cinerascens | (A) |
| Black-faced monarch | Monarcha melanopsis | (A) |
| Magpie-lark | Grallina cyanoleuca | |
| Leaden flycatcher | Myiagra rubecula | |
| Broad-billed flycatcher | Myiagra ruficollis | |
| Satin flycatcher | Myiagra cyanoleuca | (A) |
| Restless flycatcher | Myiagra inquieta | |
| Paperbark flycatcher | Myiagra nana | |
| Shining flycatcher | Myiagra alecto | |

== Shrikes ==
Order: Passeriformes Family: Laniidae

| Common name | Binomial | Note |
|---|---|---|
| Tiger shrike | Lanius tigrinus | (A) |
| Brown shrike | Lanius cristatus | |

== Crows, jays, and magpies ==
Order: Passeriformes Family: Corvidae

| Common name | Binomial | Notes |
|---|---|---|
| House crow | Corvus splendens | (A) |
| Torresian crow | Corvus orru | |
| Little crow | Corvus bennetti | |
| Australian raven | Corvus coronoides | |

== Australasian robins ==
Order: Passeriformes Family: Petroicidae

| Common name | Binomial | Notes |
|---|---|---|
| Jacky-winter | Microeca fascinans | |
| Lemon-bellied flycatcher | Microeca flavigaster | |
| Scarlet robin | Petroica boodang | |
| Red-capped robin | Petroica goodenovii | |
| Hooded robin | Melanodryas cucullata | |
| Western yellow robin | Eopsaltria griseogularis | |
| White-breasted robin | Eopsaltria georgiana | (E) |
| Mangrove robin | Peneonanthe pulverulenta | |
| Buff-sided robin | Poecilodryas cerviniventris | |
| Southern scrub-robin | Drymodes brunneopygia | |

== Larks ==
Order: Passeriformes Family: Alaudidae

| Common name | Binomial | Notes |
|---|---|---|
| Horsfield's bushlark | Mirafra javanica | |

== Cisticolas and allies ==
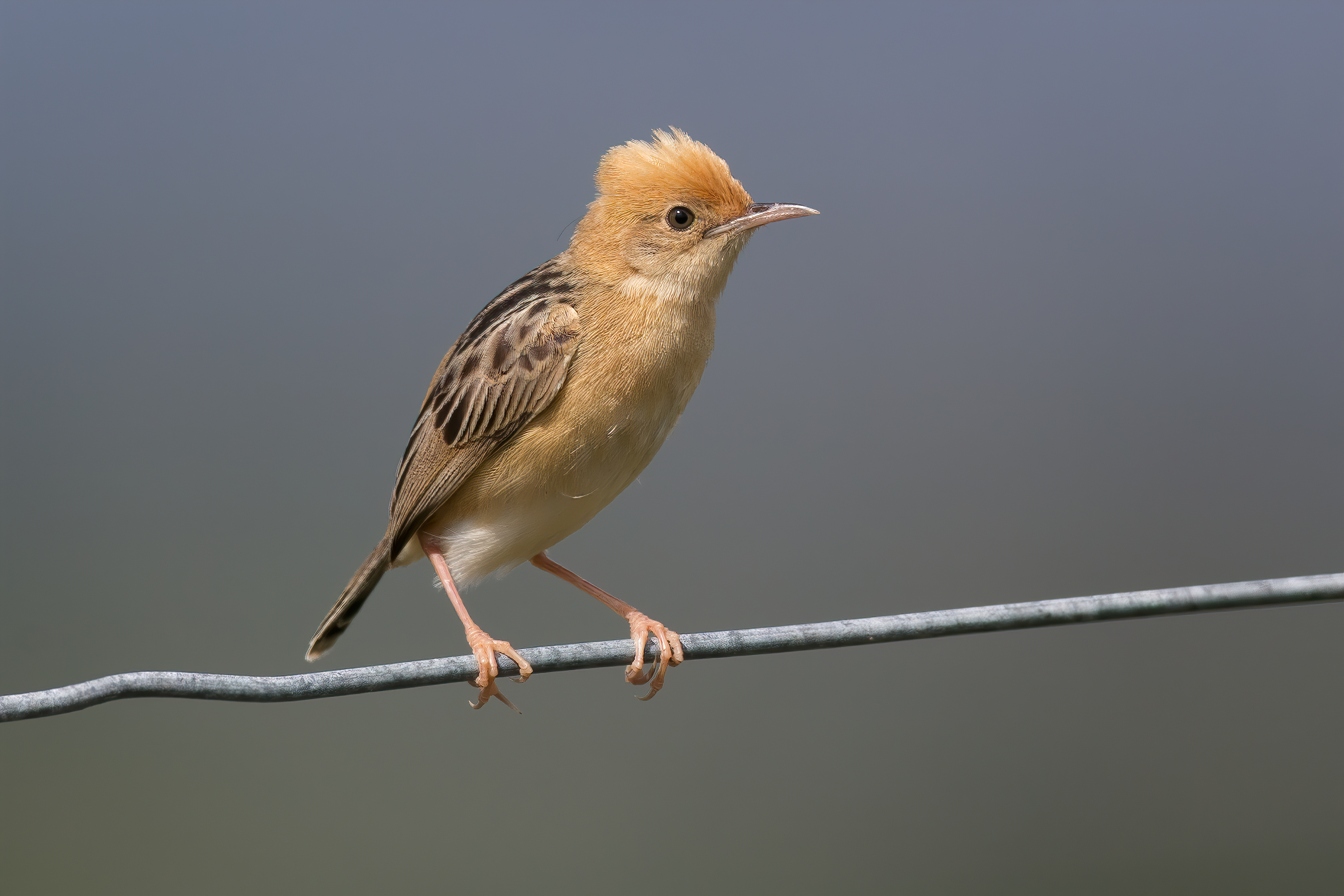
Golden-headed cisticola

Order: Passeriformes Family: Cisticolidae

| Common name | Binomial | Notes |
|---|---|---|
| Zitting cisticola | Cisticola juncidis | |
| Golden-headed cisticola | Cisticola exilis | |

== Reed warblers and allies ==
Order: Passeriformes Family: Acrocephalidae

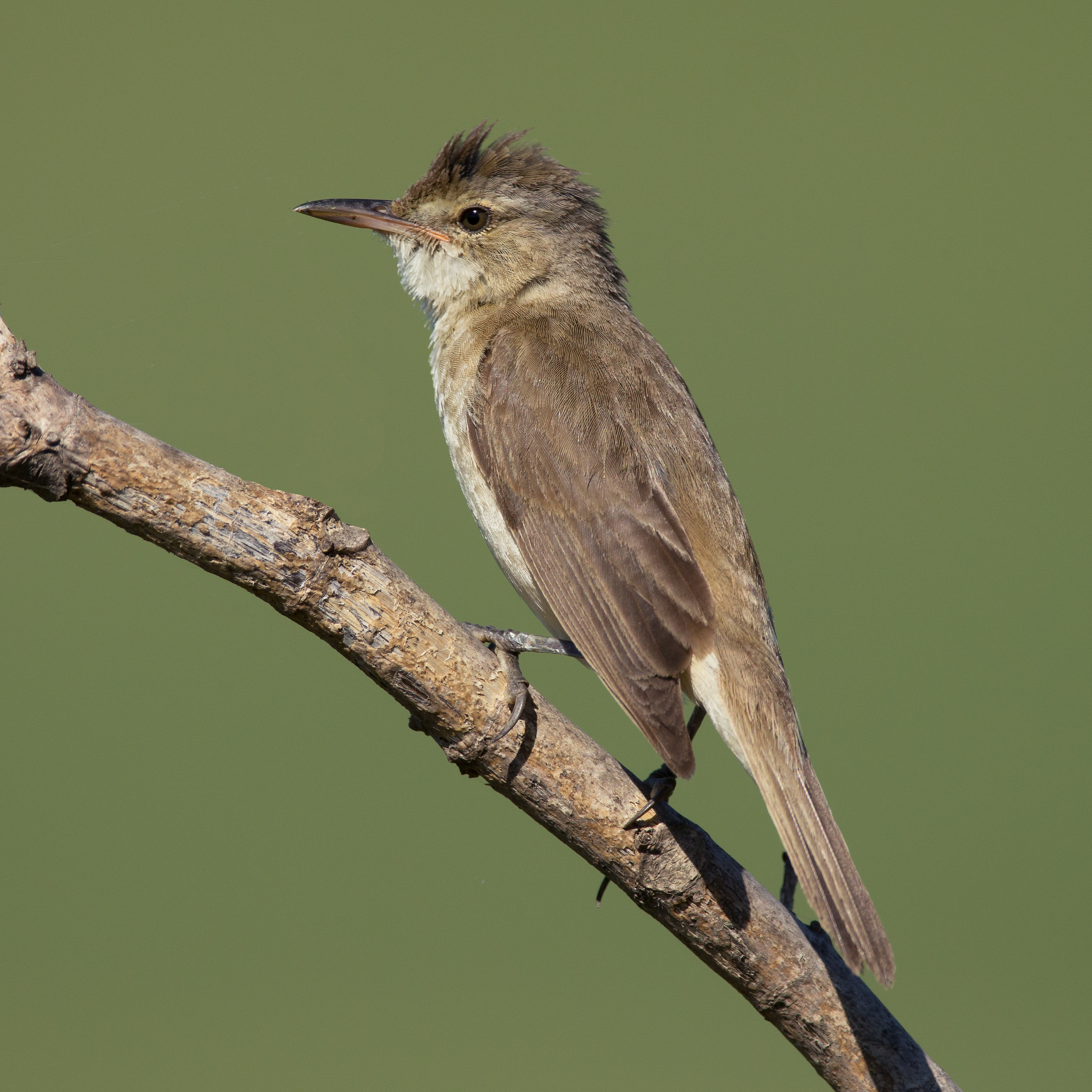
Australian reed warbler

| Common name | Binomial | Notes |
|---|---|---|
| Oriental reed warbler | Acrocephalus orientalis | |
| Australian reed warbler | Acrocephalus australis | |

== Grassbirds and allies ==
Order: Passeriformes Family: Locustellidae

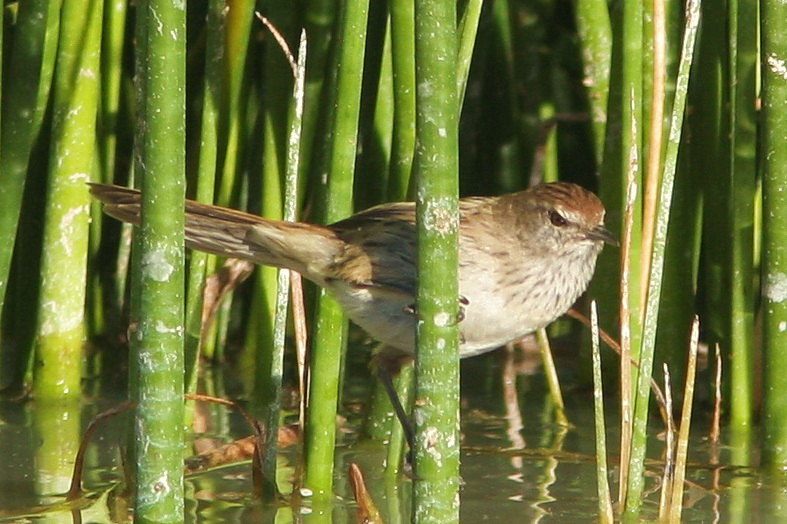
Little grassbird

| Common name | Binomial | Notes |
|---|---|---|
| Spinifexbird | Poodytes carteri | |
| Little grassbird | Poodytes gramineus | |
| Brown songlark | Cincloramphus cruralis | |
| Tawny grassbird | Cincloramphus timoriensis | |
| Rufous songlark | Cincloramphus mathewsi | |
| Gray's grasshopper warbler | Helopsaltes fasciolatus | |
| Pallas's grasshopper warbler | Helopsaltes certhiola | |
| Middendorff's grasshopper warbler | Helopsaltes ochotensis | (A) |

== Swallows ==
Order: Passeriformes Family: Hirundinidae

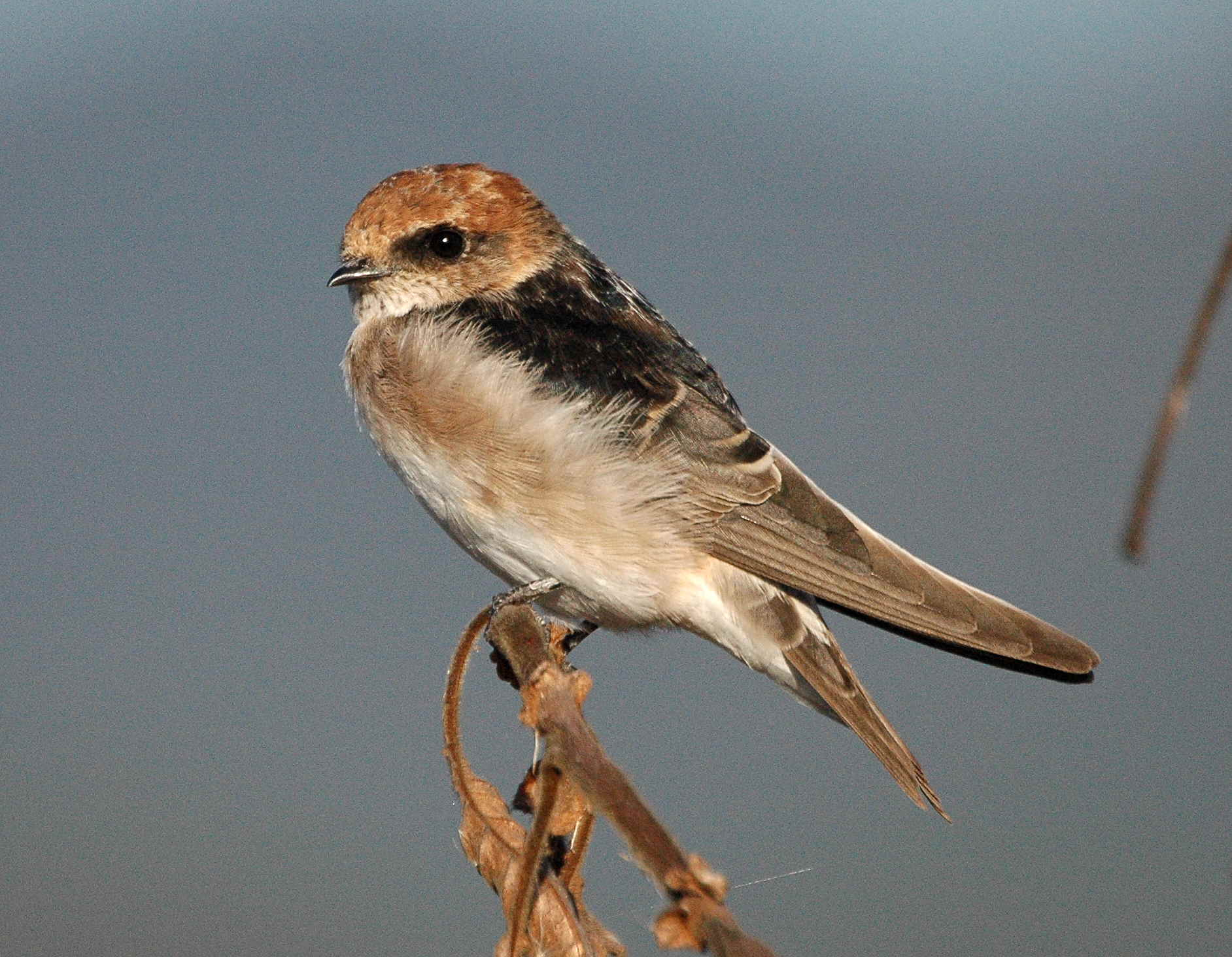
Fairy martin

| Common name | Binomial | Notes |
|---|---|---|
| Barn swallow | Hirundo rustica | |
| Welcome swallow | Hirundo neoxena | |
| Red-rumped swallow | Cecropis daurica | |
| Fairy martin | Petrochelidon ariel | |
| Tree martin | Petrochelidon nigricans | |
| White-backed swallow | Cheramoeca leucosternus | |

== Bulbuls ==
Order: Passeriformes Family: Pycnonotidae

| Common name | Binomial | Notes |
|---|---|---|
| Red-whiskered bulbul | Pycnonotus jocosus | (A) |

== Leaf warblers ==
Order: Passeriformes Family: Phylloscopidae

| Common name | Binomial | Notes |
|---|---|---|
| Yellow-browed warbler | Phylloscopus inornatus | |
| Willow warbler | Phylloscopus trochilus | |
| Eastern crowned warbler | Phylloscopus coronatus | |
| Arctic warbler | Phylloscopus borealis | (A) |
| Kamchatka leaf warbler | Phylloscopus examinandus | |

== Bush warblers and allies ==
Order: Passeriformes Family: Scotocercidae

| Common name | Binomial | Notes |
|---|---|---|
| Asian stubtail | Urosphena squameiceps | |

== White-eyes, yuhinas, and allies ==
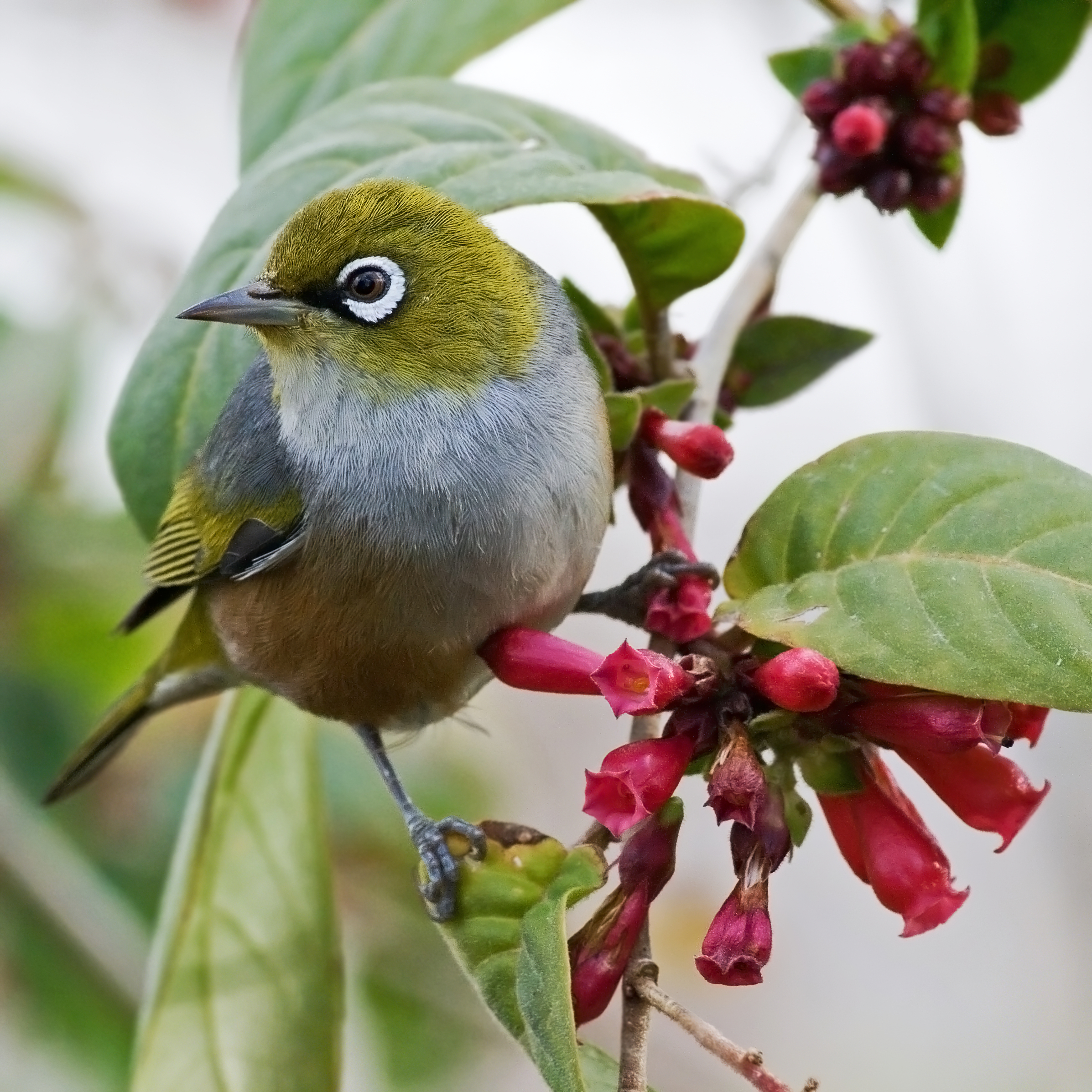
Silvereye

Order: Passeriformes Family: Zosteropidae

| Common name | Binomial | Notes |
|---|---|---|
| Ashy-bellied white-eye | Zosterops citrinella | |
| Australian yellow white-eye | Zosterops luteus | |
| Silver-eye | Zosterops lateralis | |

== Starlings ==
Order: Passeriformes Family: Sturnidae

| Common name | Binomial | Notes |
|---|---|---|
| European starling | Sturnus vulgaris | (A) |
| Rosy starling | Pastor roseus | (A) |
| Chestnut-cheeked starling | Agropsar philippensis | |
| Common myna | Acridotheres tristis | (A) |

== Thrushes and allies ==
Order: Passeriformes Family: Turdidae

| Common name | Binomial | Notes |
|---|---|---|
| Siberian thrush | Geokichla sibirica | (A) |
| Eurasian blackbird | Turdus merula | (A) |
| Eye-browed thrush | Turdus obscurus | (A) |

== Old World flycatchers ==
Order: Passeriformes Family: Muscicapidae

| Common name | Binomial | Notes |
|---|---|---|
| Gray-streaked flycatcher | Muscicapa griseisticta | |
| Dark-sided flycatcher | Muscicapa sibirica | (A) |
| Asian brown flycatcher | Muscicapa dauurica | |
| Blue-and-white flycatcher | Cyanoptila cyanomelana | (A) |
| Siberian blue robin | Larvivora cyane | |
| Narcissus flycatcher | Ficedula narcissina | (A) |
| Blue rock-thrush | Monticola solitarius | (A) |

== Flowerpeckers ==
Order: Passeriformes Family: Dicaeidae

| Common name | Binomial | Notes |
|---|---|---|
| Mistletoebird | Dicaeum hirundinaceum | |

== Waxbills and allies ==
Order: Passeriformes Family: Estrildidae

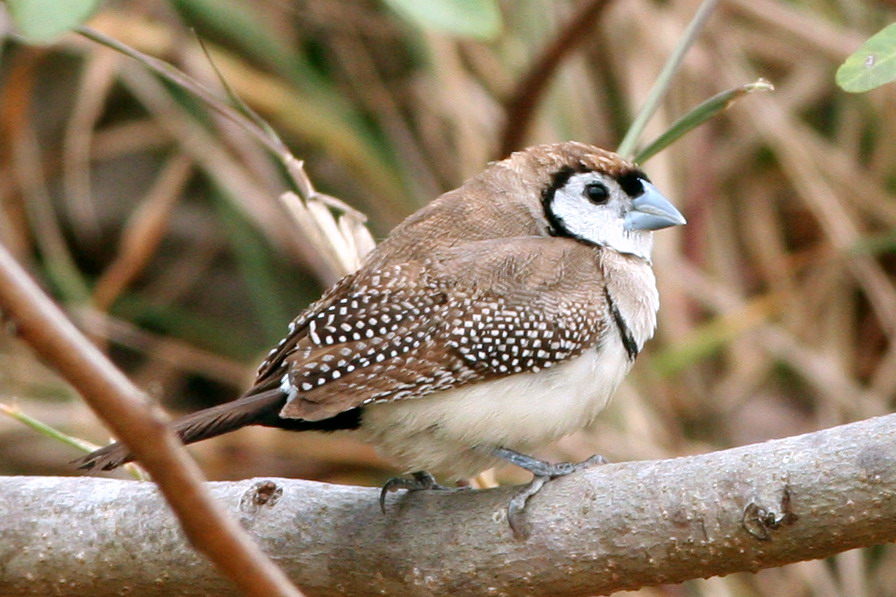
Double-barred finch

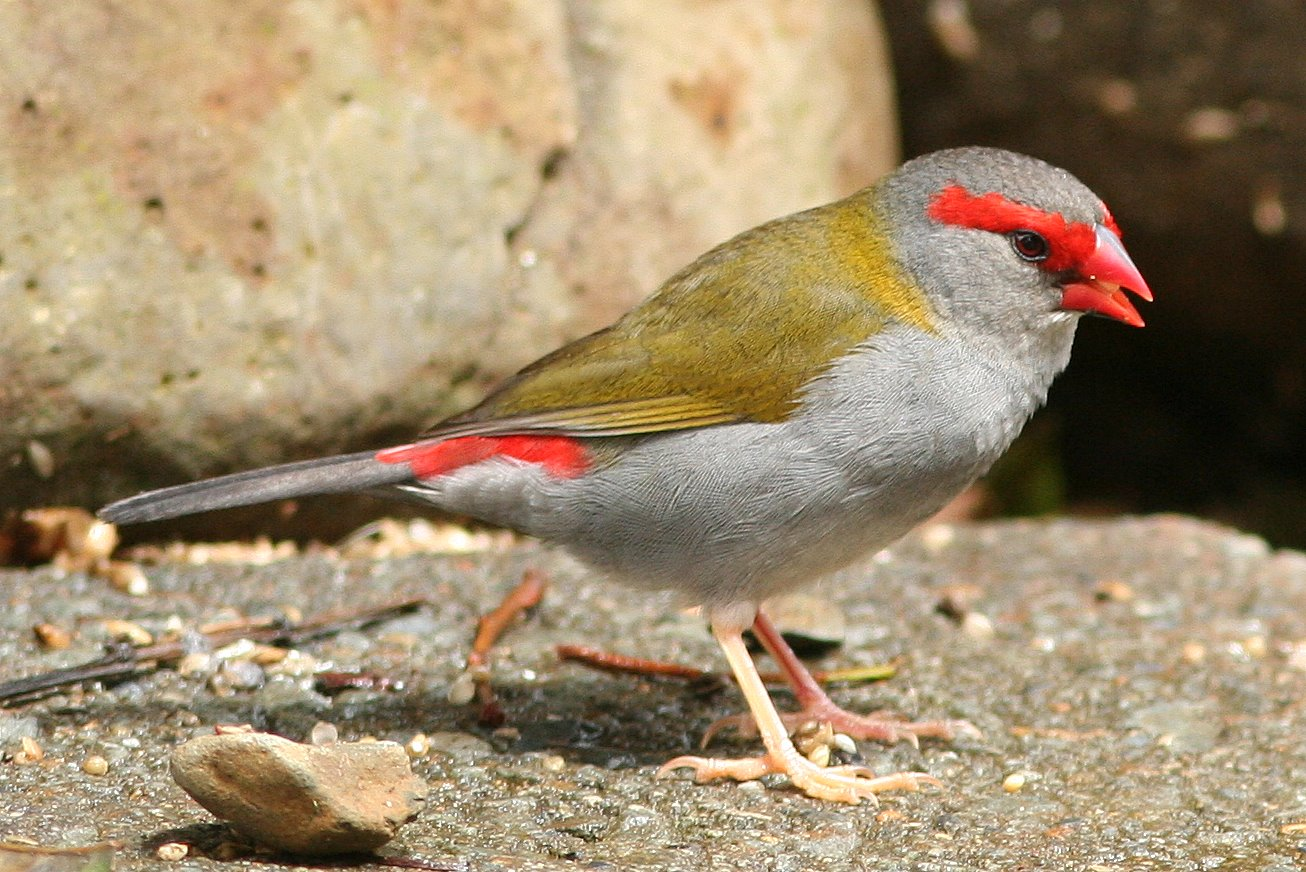
Red-browed firetail

| Common name | Binomial | Notes |
|---|---|---|
| Painted firetail | Emblema pictum | |
| Red-eared firetail | Stagonopleura oculata | (E) |
| Red-browed firetail | Neochmia temporalis | (I) |
| Crimson finch | Neochmia phaeton | |
| Star finch | Bathilda ruficauda | |
| Zebra finch | Taeniopygia guttata | |
| Double-barred finch | Stizoptera bichenovii | |
| Masked finch | Poephila personata | |
| Long-tailed finch | Poephila acuticauda | |
| Gouldian finch | Chloebia gouldiae | |
| Scaly-breasted munia | Lonchura punctulata | (A) |
| Pale-headed munia | Lonchura pallida | |
| Yellow-rumped munia | Lonchura flaviprymna | |
| Chestnut-breasted munia | Lonchura castaneothorax | |
| Java sparrow | Padda oryzivora | (A) |
| Pictorella munia | Heteromunia pectoralis | |

== Old World sparrows ==
Order: Passeriformes Family: Passeridae

| Common name | Binomial | Notes |
|---|---|---|
| House sparrow | Passer domesticus | (A) |
| Eurasian tree sparrow | Passer montanus | (A) |

== Wagtails and pipits ==
Order: Passeriformes Family: Motacillidae

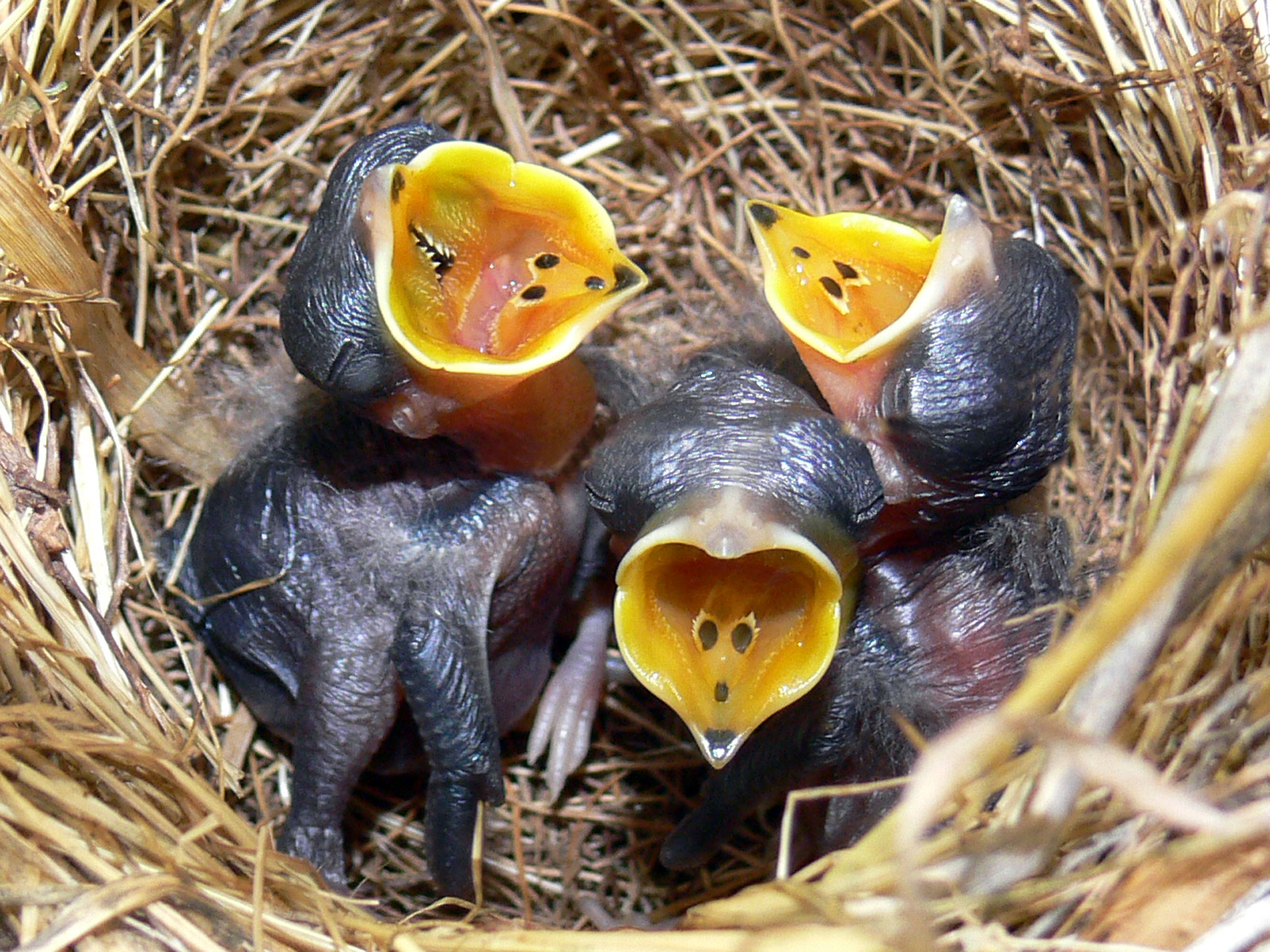
Australian pipit chicks

| Common name | Binomial | Notes |
|---|---|---|
| Gray wagtail | Motacilla cinerea | (A) |
| Western yellow wagtail | Motacilla flava | |
| Eastern yellow wagtail | Motacilla tschutschensis | (A) |
| White wagtail | Motacilla alba | (A) |
| Australian pipit | Anthus australis | |
| Pechora pipit | Anthus gustavi | (A) |
| Red-throated pipit | Anthus cervinus | (A) |

== Finches, euphonias, and allies ==
Order: Passeriformes Family: Fringillidae

| Common name | Binomial | Notes |
|---|---|---|
| European goldfinch | Carduelis carduelis | (I) |

== See also ==
- List of Australian birds
- Lists of birds by region
