= List of birds of South Australia =

South Australia is a state in Australia with 487 species of bird recorded.

This list is based on the 1996 classification by Sibley and Monroe (though there has been a recent (2008) extensive revision of Australian birds by Christidis and Boles), which has resulted in some lumping and splitting. Their system has been developed over nearly two decades and has strong local support, but deviates in important ways from more generally accepted schemes. Supplemental updates follow The Clements Checklist of Birds of the World, 2022 edition.

This list also uses British English throughout. Any bird names or other wording follows that convention. The following tags have been used to highlight several categories. The commonly occurring native species do not fall into any of these categories.

- (A) Accidental - a species that rarely or accidentally occurs in South Australia
- (E) Endemic - a species endemic to South Australia
- (I) Introduced - a species introduced to South Australia as a consequence, direct or indirect, of human actions

== Ostriches ==
Order: Struthioniformes Family: Struthionidae

This order is not native to Australia, but feral populations of one species have become established.

- Common ostrich, Struthio camelus (I)

== Cassowaries and emu ==
Order: Casuariiformes Family: Casuariidae

This family of flightless ratite birds is represented by two living species in Australia. Another two species are found in New Guinea. The extinct, geographically isolated King and Kangaroo Island emus were historically considered to be separate species to mainland emus. However, genetic evidence from 2011 suggests that all three are conspecific.

- Emu, Dromaius novaehollandiae

== Magpie goose ==
Order: Anseriformes Family: Anseranatidae

The family contains a single species, the magpie goose. It was an early and distinctive offshoot of the anseriform family tree, diverging after the screamers and before all other ducks, geese and swans, sometime in the late Cretaceous. The single species is found across Australia.

- Magpie goose, Anseranas semipalmata (A)

== Ducks, geese, and waterfowl ==
Order: Anseriformes Family: Anatidae

The family Anatidae includes the ducks and most duck-like waterfowl, such as geese and swans. These are adapted for an aquatic existence, with webbed feet, bills that are flattened to a greater or lesser extent, and feathers that are excellent at shedding water due to special oils.

- Plumed whistling-duck, Dendrocygna eytoni
- Cape Barren goose, Cereopsis novaehollandiae
- Freckled duck, Stictonetta naevosa
- Black swan, Cygnus atratus
- Radjah shelduck, Radjah radjah (A)
- Australian shelduck, Tadorna tadornoides
- Australian wood duck, Chenonetta jubata
- Australian shoveler, Spatula rhynchotis
- Northern shoveler, Spatula clypeata (A)
- Pacific black duck, Anas superciliosa
- Mallard, Anas platyrhynchos (I)
- Mallard × Pacific black duck, Anas platyrhynchos × supercilisoa (I × native hybrid)
- Grey teal, Anas gracilis
- Chestnut teal, Anas castanea
- Pink-eared duck, Malacorhynchus membranaceus
- Hardhead, Aythya australis
- Blue-billed duck, Oxyura australis
- Musk duck, Biziura lobata

== Megapodes ==
Order: Galliformes Family: Megapodiidae

Megapodiidae are represented by various species in the Australasian region. They are commonly referred to as "mound-builders" due to their habit of constructing large mounds to incubate their eggs.

- Australian brushturkey, Alectura lathami (I)
- Malleefowl, Leipoa ocellata

== Pheasants, grouse, and allies ==
Order: Galliformes Family: Phasianidae

Phasianidae consists of the pheasants and their allies. These are terrestrial species, variable in size but generally plump, with broad, relatively short wings. Many species are gamebirds or have been domesticated as a food source for humans.

- Indian peafowl, Pavo cristatus (I)
- Brown quail, Synoicus ypsilophora (A)
- Blue-breasted quail, Synoicus chinensis
- Stubble quail, Coturnix pectoralis

== Grebes ==
Order: Podicipediformes Family: Podicipedidae

Grebes are small to medium-large freshwater diving birds. They have lobed toes and are excellent swimmers and divers. However, they have their feet placed far back on the body, making them quite ungainly on land.

- Australasian grebe, Tachybaptus novaehollandiae
- Hoary-headed grebe, Poliocephalus poliocephalus
- Great crested grebe, Podiceps cristatus

== Pigeons and doves ==
Order: Columbiformes Family: Columbidae

Pigeons and doves are stout-bodied birds with short necks and short slender bills with a fleshy cere.

- Rock pigeon, Columba livia (I)
- Spotted dove, Streptopelia chinensis (I)
- Common bronzewing, Phaps chalcoptera
- Brush bronzewing, Phaps elegans
- Flock bronzewing, Phaps histrionica
- Crested pigeon, Ocyphaps lophotes
- Spinifex pigeon, Geophaps plumifera
- Diamond dove, Geopelia cuneata
- Peaceful dove, Geopelia placida

== Bustards ==
Order: Otidiformes Family: Otididae

Bustards are large terrestrial birds mainly associated with dry open country and steppes in the Old World. They are omnivorous and nest on the ground. They walk steadily on strong legs and big toes, pecking for food as they go. They have long broad wings with "fingered" wingtips and striking patterns in flight. Many have interesting mating displays.

- Australian bustard, Ardeotis australis

== Cuckoos ==
Order: Cuculiformes Family: Cuculidae

The family Cuculidae includes cuckoos, roadrunners and anis. These birds are of variable size with slender bodies, long tails and strong legs. The Old World cuckoos are brood parasites.

- Asian koel, Eudynamys scolopaceus
- Pacific koel, Eudynamys orientalis
- Channel-billed cuckoo, Scythrops novaehollandiae (A)
- Horsfield's bronze-cuckoo, Chrysococcyx basalis
- Black-eared cuckoo, Chrysococcyx osculans
- Shining bronze-cuckoo, Chrysococcyx lucidus
- Pallid cuckoo, Cuculus pallidus
- Fan-tailed cuckoo, Cacomantis flabelliformis
- Brush cuckoo, Cacomantis variolosus (A)

== Frogmouths ==
Order: Caprimulgiformes Family: Podargidae

The frogmouths are a distinctive group of small nocturnal birds related to swifts found from India across southern Asia to Australia.

- Tawny frogmouth, Podargus strigoides

== Nightjars and allies ==
Order: Caprimulgiformes Family: Caprimulgidae

Nightjars are medium-sized nocturnal birds that usually nest on the ground. They have long wings, short legs and very short bills. Most have small feet, of little use for walking, and long pointed wings. Their soft plumage is camouflaged to resemble bark or leaves.

- Spotted nightjar, Eurostopodus argus

== Owlet-nightjars ==
Order: Caprimulgiformes Family: Aegothelidae

The owlet-nightjars are a distinctive group of small nocturnal birds related to swifts found from the Maluku Islands and New Guinea to Australia and New Caledonia.

- Australian owlet-nightjar, Aegotheles cristatus

== Swifts ==
Order: Caprimulgiformes Family: Apodidae

Swifts are small birds which spend the majority of their lives flying. These birds have very short legs and never settle voluntarily on the ground, perching instead only on vertical surfaces. Many swifts have long swept-back wings which resemble a crescent or boomerang.

- White-throated needletail, Hirundapus caudacutus
- Pacific swift, Apus pacificus
- House swift, Apus nipalensis (A)

== Rails, gallinules, and coots ==
Order: Gruiformes Family: Rallidae

Rallidae is a large family of small to medium-sized birds which includes the rails, crakes, coots and gallinules. Typically they inhabit dense vegetation in damp environments near lakes, swamps or rivers. In general they are shy and secretive birds, making them difficult to observe. Most species have strong legs and long toes which are well adapted to soft uneven surfaces. They tend to have short, rounded wings and to be weak fliers.

- Lewin's rail, Lewinia pectoralis
- Buff-banded rail, Gallirallus philippensis
- Black-tailed nativehen, Tribonyx ventralis
- Australian crake, Porzana fluminea
- Dusky moorhen, Gallinula tenebrosa
- Eurasian coot, Fulica atra
- Australasian swamphen, Porphyrio melanotus
- Baillon's crake, Zapornia pusilla
- Spotless crake, Zapornia tabuensis

== Cranes ==
Order: Gruiformes Family: Gruidae

Cranes are large, long-legged and long-necked birds. Unlike the similar-looking but unrelated herons, cranes fly with necks outstretched, not pulled back. Most have elaborate and noisy courting displays or "dances".

- Brolga, Antigone rubicunda

== Thick-knees ==
Order: Charadriiformes Family: Burhinidae

The thick-knees are a group of largely tropical waders in the family Burhinidae. They are found worldwide within the tropical zone, with some species also breeding in temperate Europe and Australia. They are medium to large waders with strong black or yellow-black bills, large yellow eyes and cryptic plumage. Despite being classed as waders, most species have a preference for arid or semi-arid habitats.

- Bush thick-knee, Burhinus grallarius
- Beach thick-knee, Esacus magnirostris

== Stilts and avocets ==
Order: Charadriiformes Family: Recurvirostridae

Recurvirostridae is a family of large wading birds, which includes the avocets and stilts. The avocets have long legs and long up-curved bills. The stilts have extremely long legs and long, thin straight bills.

- Pied stilt, Himantopus leucocephalus
- Banded stilt, Cladorhynchus leucocephalus
- Red-necked avocet, Recurvirostra novaehollandiae

== Oystercatchers ==
Order: Charadriiformes Family: Haematopodidae

The oystercatchers are large and noisy plover-like birds, with strong bills used for smashing or prising open molluscs.

- Pied oystercatcher, Haematopus longirostris
- Sooty oystercatcher, Haematopus fuliginosus

== Plovers and lapwings ==
Order: Charadriiformes Family: Charadriidae

The family Charadriidae includes the plovers, dotterels and lapwings. They are small to medium-sized birds with compact bodies, short, thick necks and long, usually pointed, wings. They are found in open country worldwide, mostly in habitats near water.

- Black-bellied plover, Pluvialis squatarola
- American golden-plover, Pluvialis dominica (A)
- Pacific golden-plover, Pluvialis fulva
- Gray-headed lapwing, Vanellus cinereus
- Banded lapwing, Vanellus tricolor
- Masked lapwing, Vanellus miles
- Lesser sand-plover, Charadrius mongolus
- Greater sand-plover, Charadrius leschenaultii
- Double-banded plover, Charadrius bicinctus
- Red-capped plover, Charadrius ruficapillus
- Common ringed plover, Charadrius hiaticula (A)
- Semipalmated plover, Charadrius semipalmatus (A)
- Little ringed plover, Charadrius dubius (A)
- Oriental plover, Charadrius veredus
- Red-kneed dotterel, Erythrogonys cinctus
- Hooded plover, Thinornis cucullatus (A)
- Black-fronted dotterel, Elseyornis melanops
- Inland dotterel, Peltohyas australis

== Plains-wanderer ==
Order: Charadriiformes Family: Pedionomidae

The plains-wanderer is a quail-like ground bird. They are excellent camouflagers, and will first hide at any disturbance. If they're approached too close, they will run as opposed to flying, which they are very poor at.

- Plains-wanderer, Pedionomus torquatus

== Painted-snipes ==
Order: Charadriiformes Family: Rostratulidae

Painted-snipes are short-legged, long-billed birds similar in shape to the true snipes, but more brightly coloured.

- Australian painted-snipe, Rostratula australis

== Sandpipers and allies ==
Order: Charadriiformes Family: Scolopacidae

Scolopacidae is a large diverse family of small to medium-sized shorebirds including the sandpipers, curlews, godwits, shanks, tattlers, woodcocks, snipes, dowitchers, and phalaropes. The majority of these species eat small invertebrates picked out of the mud or soil. Variation in length of legs and bills enables multiple species to feed in the same habitat, particularly on the coast, without direct competition for food.

- Whimbrel, Numenius phaeopus
- Little curlew, Numenius minutus (A)
- Far Eastern curlew, Numenius madagascariensis
- Bar-tailed godwit, Limosa lapponica
- Black-tailed godwit, Limosa limosa
- Hudsonian godwit, Limosa haemastica (A)
- Ruddy turnstone, Arenaria interpres
- Great knot, Calidris tenuirostris
- Red knot, Calidris canutus
- Ruff, Calidris pugnax
- Broad-billed sandpiper, Calidris falcinellus
- Sharp-tailed sandpiper, Calidris acuminata
- Curlew sandpiper, Calidris ferruginea
- Long-toed stint, Calidris subminuta
- Red-necked stint, Calidris ruficollis
- Sanderling, Calidris alba
- Baird's sandpiper, Calidris bairdii (A)
- Little stint, Calidris minuta (A)
- Buff-breasted sandpiper, Calidris subruficollis (A)
- Pectoral sandpiper, Calidris melanotos (A)
- Short-billed dowitcher, Limnodromus griseus (A)
- Latham's snipe, Gallinago hardwickii
- Terek sandpiper, Xenus cinereus
- Red-necked phalarope, Phalaropus lobatus (A)
- Red phalarope, Phalaropus fulicarius (A)
- Common sandpiper, Actitis hypoleucos
- Grey-tailed tattler, Tringa brevipes
- Common greenshank, Tringa nebularia
- Lesser yellowlegs, Tringa flavipes (A)
- Marsh sandpiper, Tringa stagnatilis
- Wood sandpiper, Tringa glareola
- Common redshank, Tringa totanus (A)

== Buttonquail ==
Order: Charadriiformes Family: Turnicidae

The buttonquails are small, drab, running birds which resemble the true quails. The female is the brighter of the sexes and initiates courtship. The male incubates the eggs and tends the young.

- Painted buttonquail, Turnix varius
- Red-chested buttonquail, Turnix pyrrhothorax
- Little buttonquail, Turnix velox

== Pratincoles and coursers ==
Order: Charadriiformes Family: Glareolidae

Glareolidae is a family of wading birds comprising the pratincoles, which have short legs, long pointed wings, and long forked tails, and the coursers, which have long legs, short wings, and long, pointed bills which curve downwards.

- Australian pratincole, Stiltia isabella
- Oriental pratincole, Glareola maldivarum (A)

== Skuas and jaegers ==
Order: Charadriiformes Family: Stercorariidae

The family Stercorariidae are, in general, medium to large birds, typically with grey or brown plumage, often with white markings on the wings. They nest on the ground in temperate and arctic regions and are long-distance migrants.

- South polar skua, Stercorarius maccormicki (A)
- Brown skua, Stercorarius antarcticus (A)
- Pomarine jaeger, Stercorarius pomarinus
- Parasitic jaeger, Stercorarius parasiticus
- Long-tailed jaeger, Stercorarius longicaudus (A)

== Gulls, terns, and skimmers ==
Order: Charadriiformes Family: Laridae

Laridae is a family of medium to large seabirds, the gulls, terns, and skimmers. Gulls are typically grey or white, often with black markings on the head or wings. They have stout, longish bills and webbed feet. Terns are a group of generally medium to large seabirds typically with grey or white plumage, often with black markings on the head. Most terns hunt fish by diving but some pick insects off the surface of fresh water. Terns are generally long-lived birds, with several species known to live in excess of 30 years. Skimmers are a small family of tropical tern-like birds. They have an elongated lower mandible which they use to feed by flying low over the water surface and skimming the water for small fish.

- Sabine's gull, Xema sabini (A)
- Silver gull, Chroicocephalus novaehollandiae
- Laughing gull, Leucophaeus atricilla (A)
- Franklin's gull, Leucophaeus pipixcan (A)
- Pacific gull, Larus pacificus
- Kelp gull, Larus dominicanus
- Sooty tern, Onychoprion fuscatus (A)
- Bridled tern, Onychoprion anaethetus (A)
- Little tern, Sternula albifrons
- Australian fairy tern, Sternula nereis
- Gull-billed tern, Gelochelidon nilotica
- Caspian tern, Hydroprogne caspia
- White-winged tern, Chlidonias leucopterus
- Whiskered tern, Chlidonias hybrida
- White-fronted tern, Sterna striata (A)
- Black-naped tern, Sterna sumatrana
- Common tern, Sterna hirundo
- Arctic tern, Sterna paradisaea (A)
- Antarctic tern, Sterna vittata (A)
- Great crested tern, Thalasseus bergii

== Tropicbirds ==
Order: Phaethontiformes Family: Phaethontidae

Tropicbirds are slender white birds of tropical oceans, with exceptionally long central tail feathers. Their long wings have black markings, as does the head.

- Red-tailed tropicbird, Phaethon rubricauda (A)

== Penguins ==
Order: Sphenisciformes Family: Spheniscidae

Penguins are a group of aquatic, flightless birds living almost exclusively in the Southern Hemisphere, especially in Antarctica. Only one species, the little penguin, breeds on the Australian coast.

- King penguin, Aptenodytes patagonicus (A)
- Little penguin, Eudyptula minor
- Fiordland penguin, Eudyptes pachyrhynchus (A)
- Erect-crested penguin, Eudyptes sclateri (A)
- Macaroni penguin, Eudyptes chrysolophus (A)
- Royal penguin, Eudyptes schlegeli (A)
- Southern rockhopper penguin, Eudyptes chrysocome (A)
- Moseley's rockhopper penguin, Eudyptes moseleyi (A)
- Snares penguin, Eudyptes robustus (A)

== Albatrosses ==
Order: Procellariiformes Family: Diomedeidae

The albatrosses are a family of large seabird found across the Southern and North Pacific Oceans. The largest are among the largest flying birds in the world.

- Yellow-nosed albatross, Thalassarche chlororhynchos
- Grey-headed albatross, Thalassarche chrysostoma (A)
- Buller's albatross, Thalassarche bulleri (A)
- White-capped albatross, Thalassarche cauta
- Salvin's albatross, Thalassarche salvini (A)
- Black-browed albatross, Thalassarche melanophris
- Sooty albatross, Phoebetria fusca (A)
- Light-mantled albatross, Phoebetria palpebrata (A)
- Royal albatross, Diomedea epomophora
- Wandering albatross, Diomedea exulans

== Southern storm-petrels ==
Order: Procellariiformes Family: Oceanitidae

The southern storm-petrels are the smallest seabirds, relatives of the petrels, feeding on planktonic crustaceans and small fish picked from the surface, typically while hovering. Their flight is fluttering and sometimes bat-like.

- Wilson's storm-petrel, Oceanites oceanicus
- Grey-backed storm-petrel, Garrodia nereis
- White-faced storm-petrel, Pelagodroma marina
- Black-bellied storm-petrel, Fregetta tropica (A)

== Shearwaters and petrels ==
Order: Procellariiformes Family: Procellariidae

The procellariids are the main group of medium-sized "true petrels", characterised by united nostrils with medium nasal septum, and a long outer functional primary flight feather.

- Southern giant-petrel, Macronectes giganteus
- Northern giant-petrel, Macronectes halli
- Southern fulmar, Fulmarus glacialoides (A)
- Antarctic petrel, Thalassoica antarctica (A)
- Cape petrel, Daption capense
- Kerguelen petrel, Aphrodroma brevirostris
- Great-winged petrel, Pterodroma macroptera
- Grey-faced petrel, Pterodroma gouldi (A)
- Kermadec petrel, Pterodroma neglecta
- Soft-plumaged petrel, Pterodroma mollis (A)
- White-headed petrel, Pterodroma lessonii (A)
- Mottled petrel, Pterodroma inexpectata (A)
- Gould's petrel, Pterodroma leucoptera
- Blue petrel, Halobaena caerulea
- Fairy prion, Pachyptila turtur
- Broad-billed prion, Pachyptila vittata (A)
- Salvin's prion, Pachyptila salvini
- Antarctic prion, Pachyptila desolata
- Slender-billed prion, Pachyptila belcheri
- Grey petrel, Procellaria cinerea (A)
- White-chinned petrel, Procellaria aequinoctialis
- Flesh-footed shearwater, Ardenna carneipes
- Great shearwater, Ardenna gravis (A)
- Wedge-tailed shearwater, Ardenna pacifica (A)
- Sooty shearwater, Ardenna grisea
- Short-tailed shearwater, Ardenna tenuirostris
- Manx shearwater, Puffinus puffinus (A)
- Hutton's shearwater, Puffinus huttoni
- Fluttering shearwater, Puffinus gavia
- Little shearwater, Puffinus assimilis (A)
- Common diving-petrel, Pelecanoides urinatrix (A)

== Boobies and gannets ==
Order: Suliformes Family: Sulidae

The sulids comprise the gannets and boobies. Both groups are medium-large coastal seabirds that plunge-dive for fish. '

- Australasian gannet, Morus serrator

== Anhingas ==
Order: Suliformes Family: Anhingidae

Anhingas or darters are cormorant-like water birds with long necks and long, straight bills. They are fish eaters which often swim with only their neck above the water.

- Australasian darter, Anhinga novaehollandiae

== Cormorants and shags ==
Order: Suliformes Family: Phalacrocoracidae

Cormorants are medium-to-large aquatic birds, usually with mainly dark plumage and areas of coloured skin on the face. The bill is long, thin and sharply hooked. Their feet are four-toed and webbed, a distinguishing feature among the order Pelecaniformes.

- Little pied cormorant, Microcarbo melanoleucos
- Great cormorant, Phalacrocorax carbo
- Little black cormorant, Phalacrocorax sulcirostris
- Pied cormorant, Phalacrocorax varius
- Black-faced cormorant, Phalacrocorax fuscescens

== Pelicans ==
Order: Pelecaniformes Family: Pelecanidae

Pelicans are large water birds with distinctive pouches under their bills. Like other birds in the order Pelecaniformes, they have four webbed toes.

- Australian pelican, Pelecanus conspicillatus

== Herons, egrets, and bitterns ==
Order: Pelecaniformes Family: Ardeidae

The family Ardeidae contains the bitterns, herons, and egrets. Herons and egrets are medium to large wading birds with long necks and legs. Bitterns tend to be shorter necked and more wary. Members of Ardeidae fly with their necks retracted, unlike other long-necked birds such as storks, ibises, and spoonbills.

- Australasian bittern, Botaurus poiciloptilus
- Black-backed bittern, Ixobrychus dubius
- Pacific heron, Ardea pacifica
- Great egret, Ardea alba
- Intermediate egret, Ardea intermedia
- White-faced heron, Egretta novaehollandiae
- Little egret, Egretta garzetta
- Pacific reef-heron, Egretta sacra
- Pied heron, Egretta picata
- Cattle egret, Bubulcus ibis
- Nankeen night-heron, Nycticorax caledonicus

== Ibises and spoonbills ==
Order: Pelecaniformes Family: Threskiornithidae

Threskiornithidae is a family of large terrestrial and wading birds which includes the ibises and spoonbills. They have long, broad wings with 11 primary and about 20 secondary feathers. They are strong fliers and despite their size and weight, very capable soarers.

- Glossy ibis, Plegadis falcinellus
- Australian ibis, Threskiornis moluccus
- Straw-necked ibis, Threskiornis spinicollis
- Royal spoonbill, Platalea regia
- Yellow-billed spoonbill, Platalea flavipes

== Osprey ==
Order: Accipitriformes Family: Pandionidae

The family Pandionidae contains only one species, the osprey. The osprey is a medium-large raptor which is a specialist fish-eater with a worldwide distribution.

- Osprey, Pandion haliaetus

== Hawks, eagles, and kites ==
Order: Accipitriformes Family: Accipitridae

- Black-shouldered kite, Elanus axillaris
- Letter-winged kite, Elanus scriptus
- Black-breasted kite, Hamirostra melanosternon
- Square-tailed kite, Lophoictinia isura
- Little eagle, Hieraaetus morphnoides
- Wedge-tailed eagle, Aquila audax
- Swamp harrier, Circus approximans
- Spotted harrier, Circus assimilis
- Grey goshawk, Accipiter novaehollandiae
- Brown goshawk, Accipiter fasciatus
- Collared sparrowhawk, Accipiter cirrocephalus
- Black kite, Milvus migrans
- Whistling kite, Haliastur sphenurus
- Brahminy kite, Haliastur indus
- White-bellied sea-eagle, Haliaeetus leucogaster

== Barn-owls ==
Order: Strigiformes Family: Tytonidae

Barn-owls are medium to large owls with large heads and characteristic heart-shaped faces. They have long strong legs with powerful talons.

- Australian masked-owl, Tyto novaehollandiae
- Australasian grass-owl, Tyto longimembris (A)
- Western barn owl, Tyto alba

== Owls ==
Order: Strigiformes Family: Strigidae

The typical owls are small to large solitary nocturnal birds of prey. They have large forward-facing eyes and ears, a hawk-like beak, and a conspicuous circle of feathers around each eye called a facial disk.

- Powerful owl, Ninox strenua
- Barking owl, Ninox connivens
- Southern boobook, Ninox boobook
- Morepork, Ninox novaeseelandiae

== Kingfishers ==
Order: Coraciiformes Family: Alcedinidae

Kingfishers are medium-sized birds with large heads, long pointed bills, short legs, and stubby tails.

- Azure kingfisher, Ceyx azureus
- Laughing kookaburra, Dacelo novaeguineae '
- Red-backed kingfisher, Todiramphus pyrrhopygius
- Sacred kingfisher, Todiramphus sanctus

== Bee-eaters ==
Order: Coraciiformes Family: Meropidae

The bee-eaters are a group of near passerine birds in the family Meropidae. Most species are found in Africa but others occur in southern Europe, Madagascar, Australia, and New Guinea. They are characterised by richly coloured plumage, slender bodies, and usually elongated central tail feathers. All are colourful and have long downturned bills and pointed wings, which give them a swallow-like appearance when seen from afar.

- Rainbow bee-eater, Merops ornatus

== Rollers ==
Order: Coraciiformes Family: Coraciidae

Rollers resemble crows in size and build, but are more closely related to the kingfishers and bee-eaters. They share the colourful appearance of those groups with blues and browns predominating. The two inner front toes are connected, but the outer toe is not.

- Dollarbird, Eurystomus orientalis

== Falcons and caracaras ==
Order: Falconiformes Family: Falconidae

Falconidae is a family of diurnal birds of prey. They differ from hawks, eagles, and kites in that they kill with their beaks instead of their talons.

- Nankeen kestrel, Falco cenchroides
- Australian hobby, Falco longipennis
- Brown falcon, Falco berigora
- Grey falcon, Falco hypoleucos
- Black falcon, Falco subniger
- Peregrine falcon, Falco peregrinus

== Cockatoos ==
Order: Psittaciformes Family: Cacatuidae

The cockatoos share many features with other parrots including the characteristic curved beak shape and a zygodactyl foot, with two forward toes and two backwards toes. They differ, however in a number of characteristics, including the often spectacular movable headcrest.

- Red-tailed black-cockatoo, Calyptorhynchus banksii
- Glossy black-cockatoo, Calyptorhynchus lathami
- Yellow-tailed black-cockatoo, Calyptorhynchus funereus
- Gang-gang cockatoo, Callocephalon fimbriatum (I)
- Pink cockatoo, Lophochroa leadbeateri
- Galah, Eolophus roseicapilla
- Long-billed corella, Cacatua tenuirostris
- Little corella, Cacatua sanguinea
- Sulphur-crested cockatoo, Cacatua galerita
- Cockatiel, Nymphicus hollandicus

== Old World parrots ==
Order: Psittaciformes Family: Psittaculidae

Characteristic features of parrots include a strong curved bill, an upright stance, strong legs, and clawed zygodactyl feet. Many parrots are vividly coloured, and some are multi-coloured. In size they range from 8 cm (3.1 in) to 1 m (3.3 ft) in length. Old World parrots are found from Africa east across south and southeast Asia and Oceania to Australia and New Zealand.

- Regent parrot, Polytelis anthopeplus
- Princess parrot, Polytelis alexandrae
- Red-winged parrot, Aprosmictus erythropterus (A)
- Ground parrot, Pezoporus wallicus
- Night parrot, Pezoporus occidentalis
- Bourke's parrot, Neophema bourkii
- Blue-winged parrot, Neophema chrysostoma
- Elegant parrot, Neophema elegans
- Rock parrot, Neophema petrophila
- Orange-bellied parrot, Neophema chrysogaster (A)
- Scarlet-chested parrot, Neophema splendida
- Swift parrot, Lathamus discolor (A)
- Australian ringneck, Barnardius barnardi
- Crimson rosella, Platycercus elegans
- Eastern rosella, Platycercus eximius
- Greater bluebonnet, Northiella haematogaster
- Naretha bluebonnet, Northiella narethae
- Red-rumped parrot, Psephotus haematonotus
- Mulga parrot, Psephotus varius
- Budgerigar, Melopsittacus undulatus
- Musk lorikeet, Glossopsitta concinna
- Little lorikeet, Parvipsitta pusilla
- Purple-crowned lorikeet, Parvipsitta porphyrocephala
- Coconut lorikeet, Trichoglossus haematodus
- Rainbow lorikeet, Trichoglossus moluccanus

== Bowerbirds ==
Order: Passeriformes Family: Ptilonorhynchidae

The bowerbirds are small to medium-sized passerine birds. The males notably build a bower to attract a mate. Depending on the species, the bower ranges from a circle of cleared earth with a small pile of twigs in the center to a complex and highly decorated structure of sticks and leaves.

- Western bowerbird, Chlamydera guttata
- Spotted bowerbird, Chlamydera maculata (A)

== Australasian treecreepers ==
Order: Passeriformes Family: Climacteridae

The Climacteridae are medium-small, mostly brown-coloured birds with patterning on their underparts.

- White-throated treecreeper, Cormobates leucophaea
- White-browed treecreeper, Climacteris affinis
- Brown treecreeper, Climacteris picumnus
- Rufous treecreeper, Climacteris rufus

== Fairywrens ==
Order: Passeriformes Family: Maluridae

Maluridae is a family of small, insectivorous passerine birds endemic to Australia and New Guinea. They are socially monogamous and sexually promiscuous, meaning that although they form pairs between one male and one female, each partner will mate with other individuals and even assist in raising the young from such pairings.

- Grey grasswren, Amytornis barbatus
- Rufous grasswren, Amytornis whitei
- Striated grasswren, Amytornis striatus
- Short-tailed grasswren, Amytornis merrotsyi
- Western grasswren, Amytornis textilis
- Thick-billed grasswren, Amytornis modestus
- Eyrean grasswren, Amytornis goyderi
- Dusky grasswren, Amytornis purnelli
- Southern emuwren, Stipiturus malachurus
- Rufous-crowned emuwren, Stipiturus ruficeps
- Mallee emuwren, Stipiturus mallee
- Blue-breasted fairywren, Malurus pulcherrimus
- Purple-backed fairywren, Malurus assimilis
- Splendid fairywren, Malurus splendens
- Superb fairywren, Malurus cyaneus
- White-winged fairywren, Malurus leucopterus

== Honeyeaters ==
Order: Passeriformes Family: Meliphagidae

The honeyeaters are a large and diverse family of small to medium-sized birds most common in Australia and New Guinea. They are nectar feeders and closely resemble other nectar-feeding passerines.

- Eastern spinebill, Acanthorhynchus tenuirostris
- Pied honeyeater, Certhionyx variegatus
- White-fronted honeyeater, Purnella albifrons
- Yellow-faced honeyeater, Caligavis chrysops
- Yellow-tufted honeyeater, Lichenostomus melanops
- Purple-gaped honeyeater, Lichenostomus cratitius
- Noisy miner, Manorina melanocephala
- Yellow-throated miner, Manorina flavigula
- Black-eared miner, Manorina melanotis
- Spiny-cheeked honeyeater, Acanthagenys rufogularis
- Little wattlebird, Anthochaera chrysoptera
- Red wattlebird, Anthochaera carunculata
- Singing honeyeater, Gavicalis virescens
- Yellow-plumed honeyeater, Ptilotula ornata
- White-plumed honeyeater, Ptilotula penicillata
- Fuscous honeyeater, Ptilotula fusca
- Grey-headed honeyeater, Ptilotula keartlandi
- Grey-fronted honeyeater, Ptilotula plumula
- Grey honeyeater, Conopophila whitei
- Gibber chat, Ashbyia lovensis
- Yellow chat, Epthianura crocea
- Crimson chat, Epthianura tricolor
- Orange chat, Epthianura aurifrons
- White-fronted chat, Epthianura albifrons
- Black honeyeater, Sugomel niger
- Scarlet myzomela, Myzomela sanguinolenta
- Tawny-crowned honeyeater, Gliciphila melanops
- Brown honeyeater, Lichmera indistincta
- Crescent honeyeater, Phylidonyris pyrrhopterus
- New Holland honeyeater, Phylidonyris novaehollandiae
- White-eared honeyeater, Nesoptilotis leucotis
- Blue-faced honeyeater, Entomyzon cyanotis
- White-naped honeyeater, Melithreptus lunatus
- Brown-headed honeyeater, Melithreptus brevirostris
- Black-chinned honeyeater, Melithreptus gularis
- Striped honeyeater, Plectorhyncha lanceolata
- Painted honeyeater, Grantiella picta
- Little friarbird, Philemon citreogularis
- Noisy friarbird, Philemon corniculatus

== Bristlebirds ==
Order: Passeriformes Family: Dasyornithidae

Bristlebirds are long-tailed, sedentary, ground-frequenting birds. The common name of the family is derived from the presence of prominent rictal bristles - three stiff, hair-like feathers curving downwards on either side of the gape.

- Rufous bristlebird, Dasyornis broadbenti

== Pardalotes ==
Order: Passeriformes Family: Pardalotidae

Pardalotes spend most of their time high in the outer foliage of trees, feeding on insects, spiders, and above all lerps (a type of sap-sucking insect).

- Spotted pardalote, Pardalotus punctatus
- Red-browed pardalote, Pardalotus rubricatus
- Striated pardalote, Pardalotus striatus

== Thornbills and allies ==
Order: Passeriformes Family: Acanthizidae

Thornbills are small passerine birds, similar in habits to the tits.

- White-browed scrubwren, Sericornis frontalis
- Spotted scrubwren, Sericornis maculatus
- Redthroat, Pyrrholaemus brunneus
- Rufous fieldwren, Calamanthus campestris
- Striated fieldwren, Calamanthus fuliginosus
- Chestnut-rumped heathwren, Hylacola pyrrhopygia
- Shy heathwren, Hylacola cauta
- Buff-rumped thornbill, Acanthiza reguloides
- Slender-billed thornbill, Acanthiza iredalei
- Brown thornbill, Acanthiza pusilla
- Inland thornbill, Acanthiza apicalis
- Yellow-rumped thornbill, Acanthiza chrysorrhoa
- Chestnut-rumped thornbill, Acanthiza uropygialis
- Slaty-backed thornbill, Acanthiza robustirostris
- Yellow thornbill, Acanthiza nana
- Striated thornbill, Acanthiza lineata
- Weebill, Smicrornis brevirostris
- White-throated gerygone, Gerygone olivacea
- Western gerygone, Gerygone fusca
- Southern whiteface, Aphelocephala leucopsis
- Chestnut-breasted whiteface, Aphelocephala pectoralis
- Banded whiteface, Aphelocephala nigricincta

== Pseudo-babblers ==
Order: Passeriformes Family: Pomatostomidae

The pseudo-babblers are small to medium-sized birds endemic to Australia and New Guinea. They are ground-feeding omnivores and highly social.

- Grey-crowned babbler, Pomatostomus temporalis
- White-browed babbler, Pomatostomus superciliosus
- Chestnut-crowned babbler, Pomatostomus ruficeps

== Quail-thrushes and jewel-babblers ==
Order: Passeriformes Family: Cinclosomatidae

The Cinclosomatidae is a family containing jewel-babblers and quail-thrushes.

- Spotted quail-thrush, Cinclosoma punctatum
- Chestnut quail-thrush, Cinclosoma castanotum
- Copperback quail-thrush, Cinclosoma clarum
- Western quail-thrush, Cinclosoma marginatum
- Cinnamon quail-thrush, Cinclosoma cinnamomeum
- Nullarbor quail-thrush, Cinclosoma alisteri

== Cuckooshrikes ==
Order: Passeriformes Family: Campephagidae

The cuckooshrikes are small to medium-sized passerine birds. They are predominantly greyish with white and black, although some species are brightly coloured.

- Ground cuckooshrike, Coracina maxima '
- Black-faced cuckooshrike, Coracina novaehollandiae
- White-bellied cuckooshrike, Coracina papuensis
- White-winged triller, Lalage tricolor
- Common cicadabird, Edolisoma tenuirostre

== Sittellas ==
Order: Passeriformes Family: Neosittidae

The sittellas are a family of small passerine birds found only in Australasia. They resemble treecreepers, but have soft tails.

- Varied sittella, Neositta chrysoptera

== Whipbirds and wedgebills ==
Order: Passeriformes Family: Psophodidae

The Psophodidae is a family containing whipbirds and wedgebills.

- Western whipbird, Psophodes nigrogularis
- Chiming wedgebill, Psophodes occidentalis
- Chirruping wedgebill, Psophodes cristatus

== Australo-Papuan bellbirds ==
Order: Passeriformes Family: Oreoicidae

The three species contained in the family have been moved around between different families for fifty years. A series of studies of the DNA of Australian birds between 2006 and 2001 found strong support for treating the three genera as a new family, which was formally named in 2016.

- Crested bellbird, Oreoica gutturalis

== Shrike-tits ==
Order: Passeriformes Family: Falcunculidae

The shrike-tits have a parrot-like bill, used for distinctive bark-stripping behaviour, which gains it access to invertebrates

- Eastern shrike-tit, Falcunculus frontatus

== Whistlers and allies ==
Order: Passeriformes Family: Pachycephalidae

The family Pachycephalidae includes the whistlers, shrikethrushes, and some of the pitohuis.

- Grey shrikethrush, Colluricincla harmonica
- Olive whistler, Pachycephala olivacea
- Red-lored whistler, Pachycephala rufogularis
- Gilbert's whistler, Pachycephala inornata
- Golden whistler, Pachycephala pectoralis
- Rufous whistler, Pachycephala rufiventris

== Old World orioles ==
Order: Passeriformes Family: Oriolidae

The Old World orioles are colourful passerine birds. They are not related to the New World orioles.

- Olive-backed oriole, Oriolus sagittatus

== Woodswallows, bellmagpies, and allies ==
Order: Passeriformes Family: Artamidae

The woodswallows are soft-plumaged, somber-coloured passerine birds. They are smooth, agile flyers with moderately large, semi-triangular wings. The cracticids: currawongs, bellmagpies and butcherbirds, are similar to the other corvids. They have large, straight bills and mostly black, white or grey plumage. All are omnivorous to some degree.

- White-breasted woodswallow, Artamus leucorynchus
- Masked woodswallow, Artamus personatus
- White-browed woodswallow, Artamus superciliosus
- Black-faced woodswallow, Artamus cinereus
- Dusky woodswallow, Artamus cyanopterus
- Little woodswallow, Artamus minor
- Grey butcherbird, Cracticus torquatus
- Pied butcherbird, Cracticus nigrogularis
- Australian magpie, Gymnorhina tibicen
- Pied currawong, Strepera graculina
- Grey currawong, Strepera versicolor

== Fantails ==
Order: Passeriformes Family: Rhipiduridae

The fantails are small insectivorous birds which are specialist aerial feeders.

- Willie-wagtail, Rhipidura leucophrys
- Rufous fantail, Rhipidura rufifrons
- Grey fantail, Rhipidura albiscapa

== Drongos ==
Order: Passeriformes Family: Dicruridae

The drongos are mostly black or dark grey in colour, sometimes with metallic tints. They have long forked tails, and some Asian species have elaborate tail decorations. They have short legs and sit very upright when perched, like a shrike. They flycatch or take prey from the ground.

- Spangled drongo, Dicrurus bracteatus

== Monarch flycatchers ==
Order: Passeriformes Family: Monarchidae

The monarch flycatchers are small to medium-sized insectivorous passerines which hunt by flycatching.

- Magpie-lark, Grallina cyanoleuca
- Satin flycatcher, Myiagra cyanoleuca
- Restless flycatcher, Myiagra inquieta

== White-winged chough and apostlebird ==
Order: Passeriformes Family: Corcoracidae

They are found in open habitat in eastern Australia, mostly open eucalypt woodlands and some forest that lacks a closed canopy. They are highly social, spend much of their time foraging through leaf litter with a very distinctive gait, calling to one another almost constantly.

- White-winged chough, Corcorax melanorhamphos
- Apostlebird, Struthidea cinerea

== Crows, jays, and magpies ==
Order: Passeriformes Family: Corvidae

The family Corvidae includes crows, ravens, jays, choughs, magpies, treepies, nutcrackers and ground jays. Corvids are above average in size among the Passeriformes, and some of the larger species show high levels of intelligence.

- Torresian crow, Corvus orru
- Little crow, Corvus bennetti
- Australian raven, Corvus coronoides
- Little raven, Corvus mellori (A)
- Forest raven, Corvus tasmanicus

== Australasian robins ==
Order: Passeriformes Family: Petroicidae

Most species of Petroicidae have a stocky build with a large rounded head, a short straight bill and rounded wingtips. They occupy a wide range of wooded habitats, from subalpine to tropical rainforest, and mangrove swamp to semi-arid scrubland. All are primarily insectivores, although a few supplement their diet with seeds.

- Jacky-winter, Microeca fascinans
- Scarlet robin, Petroica multicolor
- Flame robin, Petroica phoenicea (A)
- Rose robin, Petroica rosea
- Pink robin, Petroica rodinogaster (A)
- Red-capped robin, Petroica goodenovii
- Hooded robin, Melanodryas cucullata
- Eastern yellow robin, Eopsaltria australis
- Western yellow robin, Eopsaltria griseogularis
- Southern scrub-robin, Drymodes brunneopygia

== Larks ==
Order: Passeriformes Family: Alaudidae

Larks are small terrestrial birds with often extravagant songs and display flights. Most larks are fairly dull in appearance. Their food is insects and seeds.

- Horsfield's bushlark, Mirafra javanica
- Eurasian skylark, Alauda arvensis (I)

== Cisticolas and allies ==
Order: Passeriformes Family: Cisticolidae

The Cisticolidae are warblers found mainly in warmer southern regions of the Old World. They are generally very small birds of drab brown or grey appearance found in open country such as grassland or scrub.

- Golden-headed cisticola, Cisticola exilis

== Reed warblers and allies ==
Order: Passeriformes Family: Acrocephalidae

The members of this family are usually rather large for "warblers". Most are rather plain olivaceous brown above with much yellow to beige below. They are usually found in open woodland, reedbeds, or tall grass. The family occurs mostly in southern to western Eurasia and surroundings, but it also ranges far into the Pacific, with some species in Africa.

- Australian reed warbler, Acrocephalus australis

== Grassbirds and allies ==
Order: Passeriformes Family: Locustellidae

Locustellidae are a family of small insectivorous songbirds found mainly in Eurasia, Africa, and the Australian region. They are smallish birds with tails that are usually long and pointed, and tend to be drab brownish or buffy all over.

- Spinifexbird, Poodytes carteri
- Little grassbird, Poodytes gramineus
- Brown songlark, Cincloramphus cruralis
- Rufous songlark, Cincloramphus mathewsi

== Swallows ==
Order: Passeriformes Family: Hirundinidae

The family Hirundinidae is adapted to aerial feeding. They have a slender streamlined body, long pointed wings, and a short bill with a wide gape. The feet are adapted to perching rather than walking, and the front toes are partially joined at the base.

- Barn swallow, Hirundo rustica (A)
- Welcome swallow, Hirundo neoxena
- Fairy martin, Petrochelidon ariel
- Tree martin, Petrochelidon nigricans
- White-backed swallow, Cheramoeca leucosterna

== Bulbuls ==
Order: Passeriformes Family: Pycnonotidae

Bulbuls are medium-sized songbirds. Some are colourful with yellow, red or orange vents, cheeks, throats or supercilia, but most are drab, with uniform olive-brown to black plumage. Some species have distinct crests.

- Red-whiskered bulbul, Pycnonotus jocosus (I)

== White-eyes, yuhinas, and allies ==
Order: Passeriformes Family: Zosteropidae

The white-eyes are small birds of rather drab appearance, the plumage above being typically greenish-olive, but some species have a white or bright yellow throat, breast, or lower parts, and several have buff flanks. As the name suggests, many species have a white ring around each eye.

- Silver-eye, Zosterops lateralis

== Starlings ==
Order: Passeriformes Family: Sturnidae

Starlings are small to medium-sized passerine birds. Their flight is strong and direct and they are very gregarious. Their preferred habitat is fairly open country. They eat insects and fruit. Plumage is typically dark with a metallic sheen.

- European starling, Sturnus vulgaris (I)
- Common myna, Acridotheres tristis (A)

== Thrushes and allies ==
Order: Passeriformes Family: Turdidae

The thrushes are a group of passerine birds that occur mainly in the Old World. They are plump, soft plumaged, small to medium-sized insectivores or sometimes omnivores, often feeding on the ground. Many have attractive songs.

- Bassian thrush, Zoothera lunulata
- Eurasian blackbird, Turdus merula (I)

== Flowerpeckers ==
Order: Passeriformes Family: Dicaeidae

The flowerpeckers are very small, stout, often brightly coloured birds, with short tails, short thick curved bills, and tubular tongues.

- Mistletoebird, Dicaeum hirundinaceum

== Waxbills and allies ==
Order: Passeriformes Family: Estrildidae

The estrildid finches are small passerine birds of the Old World tropics and Australasia. They are gregarious and often colonial seed eaters with short thick but pointed bills. They are all similar in structure and habits, but have wide variation in plumage colours and patterns.

- Painted firetail, Emblema pictum
- Beautiful firetail, Stagonopleura bella
- Diamond firetail, Stagonopleura guttata
- Red-browed firetail, Neochmia temporalis
- Zebra finch, Taeniopygia guttata
- Java sparrow, Padda oryzivora (I)

== Old World sparrows ==
Order: Passeriformes Family: Passeridae

Old World sparrows are small passerine birds, typically small, plump, brown or grey with short tails and short powerful beaks. They are seed-eaters, but also consume small insects.

- House sparrow, Passer domesticus (I)

== Wagtails and pipits ==
Order: Passeriformes Family: Motacillidae

Motacillidae is a family of small passerine birds with medium to long tails and comprises the wagtails, longclaws, and pipits. These are slender ground-feeding insectivores of open country.

- Grey wagtail, Motacilla cinerea (A)
- Eastern yellow wagtail, Motacilla tschutschensis (A)
- Citrine wagtail, Motacilla citreola (A)
- Australian pipit, Anthus australis

== Finches, euphonias, and allies ==
Order: Passeriformes Family: Fringillidae

Finches are small to moderately large seed-eating passerine birds with a strong beak, usually conical and in some species very large. All have 12 tail feathers and nine primary flight feathers. Finches have a bouncing flight, alternating bouts of flapping with gliding on closed wings, and most sing well.

- European greenfinch, Chloris chloris (I)
- European goldfinch, Carduelis carduelis (I)

== See also ==
- List of birds
- Lists of birds by region
- List of birds of Australia
