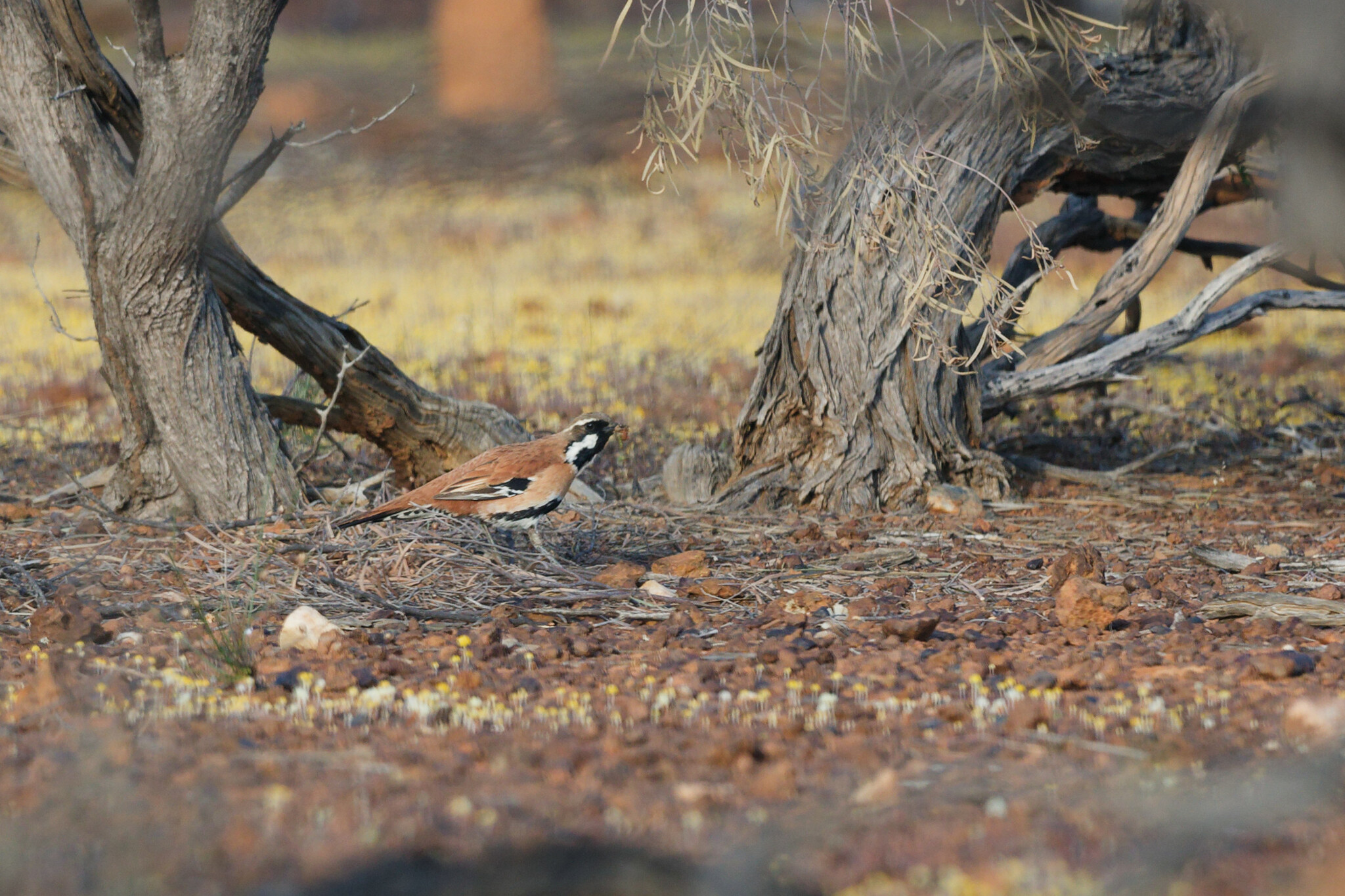

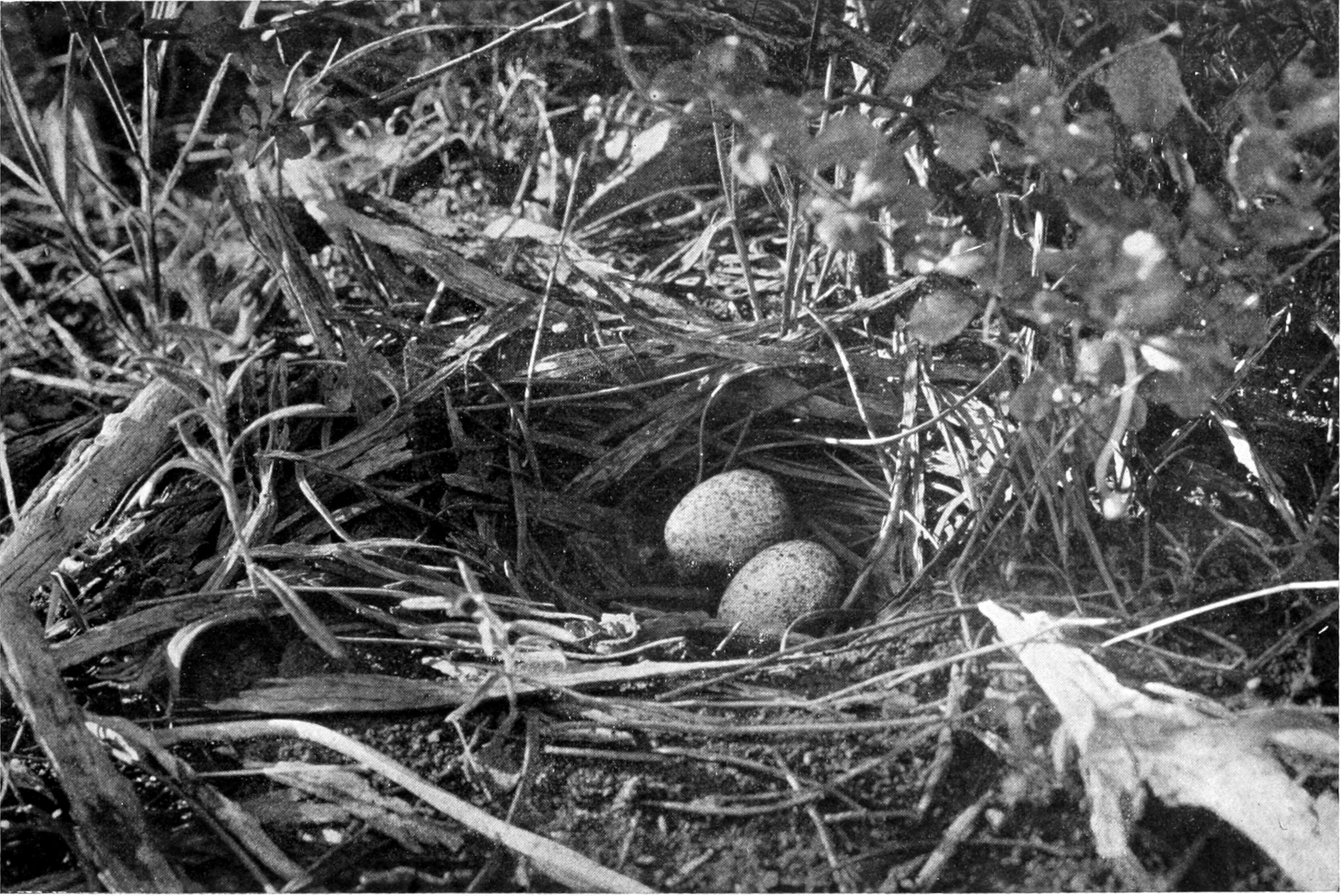
- Nest photographed by Whitlock, East Murchison 1909

Conservation status
- Least Concern (IUCN 3.1)

Scientific classification
- Kingdom: Animalia
- Phylum: Chordata
- Class: Aves
- Order: Passeriformes
- Family: Cinclosomatidae
- Genus: Cinclosoma
- Species: C. marginatum

Binomial name
- Cinclosoma marginatum Sharpe, 1883

Synonyms
- Cinclosoma castaneothorax marginatum

= Western quail-thrush =

Species of bird

Western quail-thrush (Cinclosoma marginatum) is a species of bird in the family Cinclosomatidae. It is found in arid inland habitat in south-central Western Australia. It typically resides in dry woodland shrub with low understory on a stony ground. The climatic zones it is most commonly found in are semi-arid or arid.

== Taxonomy ==
The species was first described by Richard Bowdler Sharpe in 1883, the author distinguishing this species from the quail-thrush Cinclosoma castaneothorax of eastern Australia. John Gould had previously noted the color variation of this western population and included these in an accompanying illustration. Systematic revisions in 2008 (Christidis & Boles) and the 1990s (Sibley & Monroe) recognised the taxon with subspecific status, Cinclosoma castaneothorax marginatum, and reinstated by authorities as a species in 2016 (del Hoyo and Collar).

The common names for this species include western quail-thrush and chestnut-breasted quail-thrush.

== Description ==
A species of Cinclosoma, passerine birds of Australia. It is smaller in size and slighter in build than Cinclosoma castanotum, which is found in other parts of Western Australia. Their breast and flanks are a cinnamon-rufous shade, a paler and different coloration from its counterparts. The crown and back are a solid chestnut color. The female's flanks are a duller orange shade, occasionally without the dark border. In males, the crown may be a dark grey shade. The throat and lower part of the breast are black, and the male displays a chestnut band between these. Instead, females have more of a grey center breast-band in between the black throat and lower breast. Female's coloring is duller compared to the males. Due to the less vibrant colors, there is less contrast throughout the female bird's body. The chin and throat of female western quail-thrushes have a pale buffish color. The feathers of the underparts of the tail are white with a brownish color towards the base, the black margins are most evident when the bird is in flight. There is also white coloring and spotting on the wings. The legs of both males and females vary from a grey to a grey-black shade. Young, juvenile western quail-thrushes have coloring like the females but have a more mottled appearance. Both female and male western quail-thrushes vary from 21 to 25 centimeters in size and on average weigh 65 grams.

Due to the rare sighting of western quail-thrushes, their classification has been a debated topic. They were constantly difficult to spot in the field. The species was previously thought to be a subspecies to the chestnut-breasted quail-thrush and the cinnamon quail-thrush, but now it has full species status.

== Behavior ==
Western quail-thrushes' songs contain a series of five to eleven whistles that increase in pace at the same pitch. Around the end of their song, notes may sound longer than others and are then followed by one or more short high-pitched notes.

Western quail-thrushes are mainly winter breeders with their breeding season ranging from January to September. Consequently, they lay their eggs around March to September. They are not endangered and are common over most of their area. Western quail-thrushes do not breed at all during the drought. Because these quail-thrushes live in areas where evaporation occurs more than precipitation, they will breed most times after it has rained. Western quail-thrushes build nests that resemble a green bowl of grass, connected with leaves and twigs. The nests have a diameter of around 15 cm across and 5 cm deep, typically placed under a shrub or tree. Two eggs, rarely three, are laid, colored in white and blotched with lavender and chestnut-brown spots. The egg is incubated by both the male and female, but the female specifically broods and feeds the baby birds. Western quail-thrushes do not migrate and will most likely stay in their habitats.

== Diet ==
Western quail-thrushes eat arthropods, which are invertebrate animals such as spiders and insects. To find food, they forage on the ground and walk slowly, pecking with their bill on the ground and searching for seeds. As they forage and eat, western quail-thrushes hold their larger, previously found items under one foot as they peck their catch to dismember it.
