= Big Sandy =

Big Sandy may refer to:

== Communities ==
- Big Sandy, Montana, a town in Chouteau County
- Big Sandy, Nebraska, in Thayer County, Nebraska
- Big Sandy, Tennessee, a town in Benton County
- Big Sandy, Texas, a town in Upshur County
- Big Sandy, West Virginia, an unincorporated census-designated place in McDowell County
- Big Sandy, Wyoming, in Sublette County, Wyoming

== Other ==
- Big Sandy & His Fly-Rite Boys, a California band
- Big Sandy Regional Airport, located in southwest Martin County, Kentucky, United States
- United States Penitentiary, Big Sandy, in Inez, Kentucky
- The nickname of the main dirt track at Belmont Park in Elmont, New York

== See also ==
- Big Sandy Creek (disambiguation)
- Big Sandy River (disambiguation)
