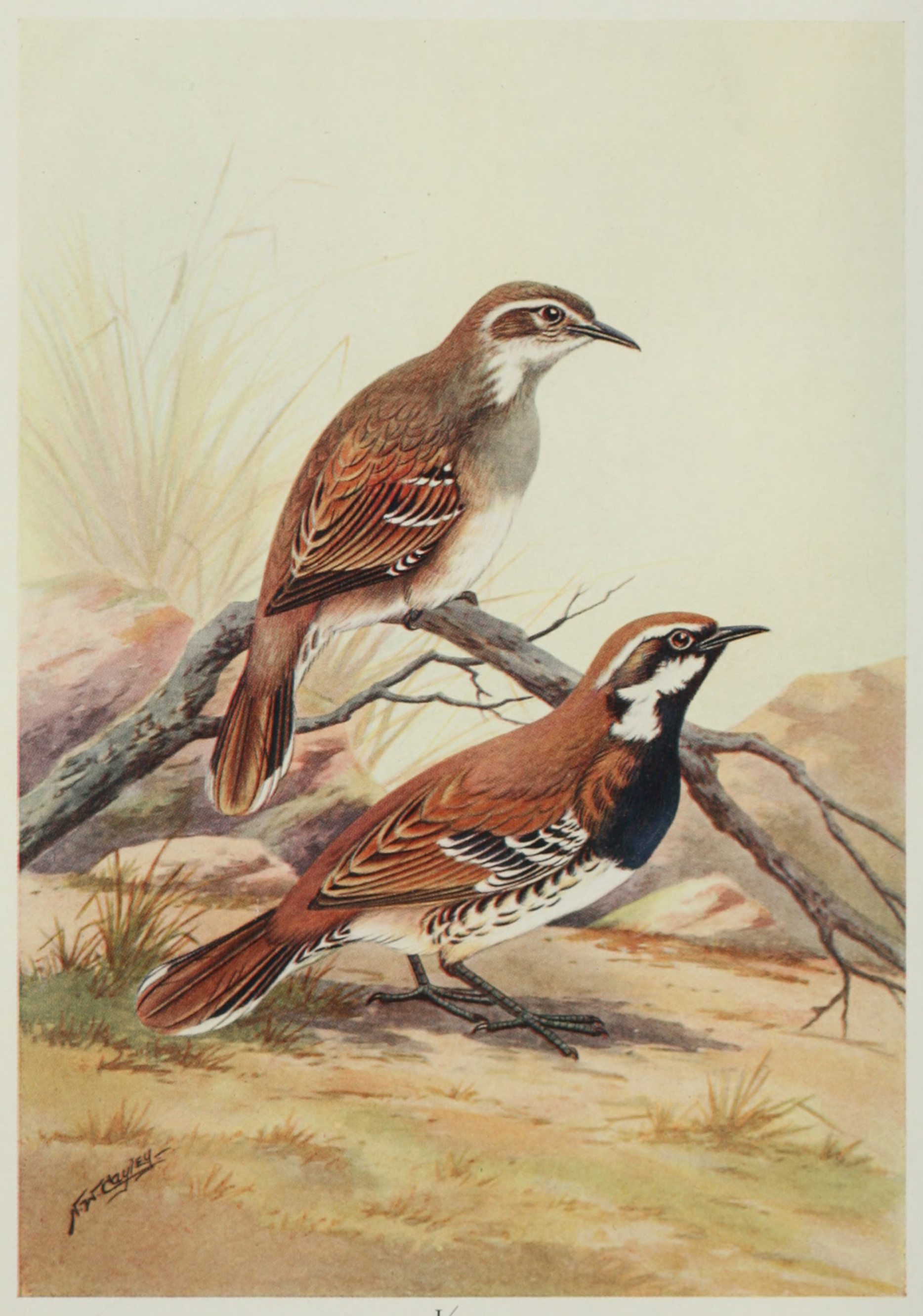
- Illustration by Neville W. Cayley in The Emu, 1922.
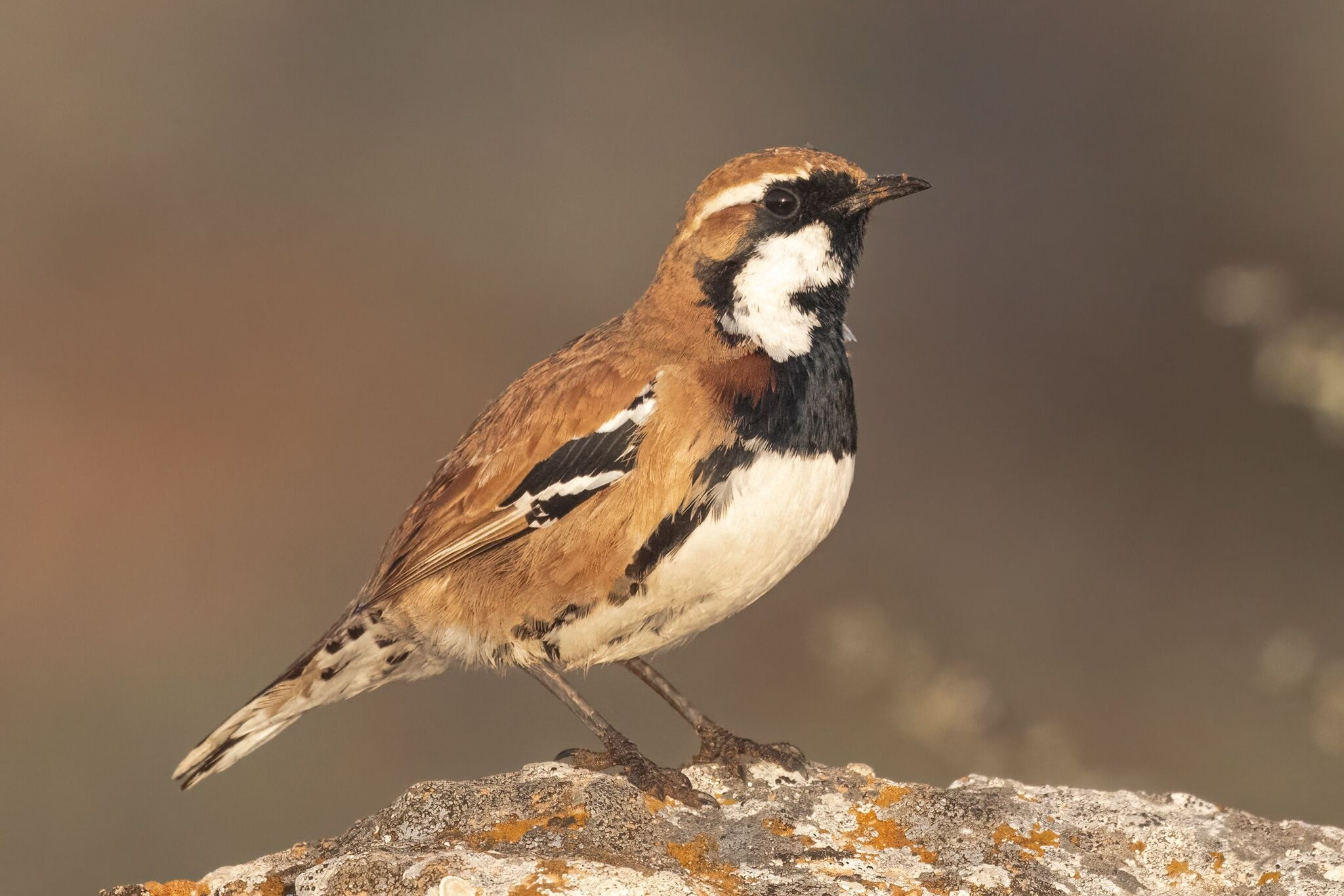

Conservation status
- Least Concern (IUCN 3.1)

Scientific classification
- Kingdom: Animalia
- Phylum: Chordata
- Class: Aves
- Order: Passeriformes
- Family: Cinclosomatidae
- Genus: Cinclosoma
- Species: C. alisteri

Binomial name
- Cinclosoma alisteri Mathews, 1910

Synonyms
- Cinclosoma cinnamomeum alisteri

= Nullarbor quail-thrush =

Species of bird

The Nullarbor quail-thrush (Cinclosoma alisteri) is a species of bird in the family Cinclosomatidae. It is the only Australian bird endemic to the Nullarbor Plain in southern Australia.

== Taxonomy ==
The species was first described by Gregory Mathews in 1910, selecting a specimen held in his personal collection as the type.

== Description ==
The size of the male is slightly larger than the female, the range is 185 to 210 millimetres. The tail colour is black at the outer feathers, tipped with white, the upper parts of the plumage is otherwise a rufous colour. Black coloration appears at the lores, throat, breast, and beneath white spots at the shoulder.

== Behaviour ==
A ground-feeding bird that is usually only evident while foraging, Cinclosoma alisteri actively moves over a range, although in a haphazard manner, turning stones in search of seeds and small invertebrates. This quail-thrush is able to see anything approaching for a considerable distance on the plains, and will quickly seek refuge beneath a shrub or in the burrows created by the introduced rabbit. During the breeding season a pair will defend a territory, but at other times they are found in groups of around individuals. Breeding may occur at any opportune time of the year, but always during a period from August to September. The site selected for breeding may be a slight depression scraped into the earth by the female, but is often against a bush, rock, or patch of grass and lined with strips of plant material. The clutch size is usually two eggs, measuring 28 by 20 mm, which are a creamy white colour with brownish or greyish spots.

== Distribution and habitat ==
The range is restricted to the Nullarbor Plain, an area in southern Australia that extends across the Western and South Australian border. The habitat favoured by this species is described as limestone gibber plains, containing little overlying vegetation, and shrub-dominated plant communities on the steppe.

Two other species of the genus are populations that also resulted from the increasing aridity of the Australian continent: the chestnut quail-thrush Cinclosoma castanotum has a wider distribution that overlaps with this species; and the cinnamon quail-thrush Cinclosoma cinnamomeum which is only found to the north of the Nullarbor.

== Gallery ==
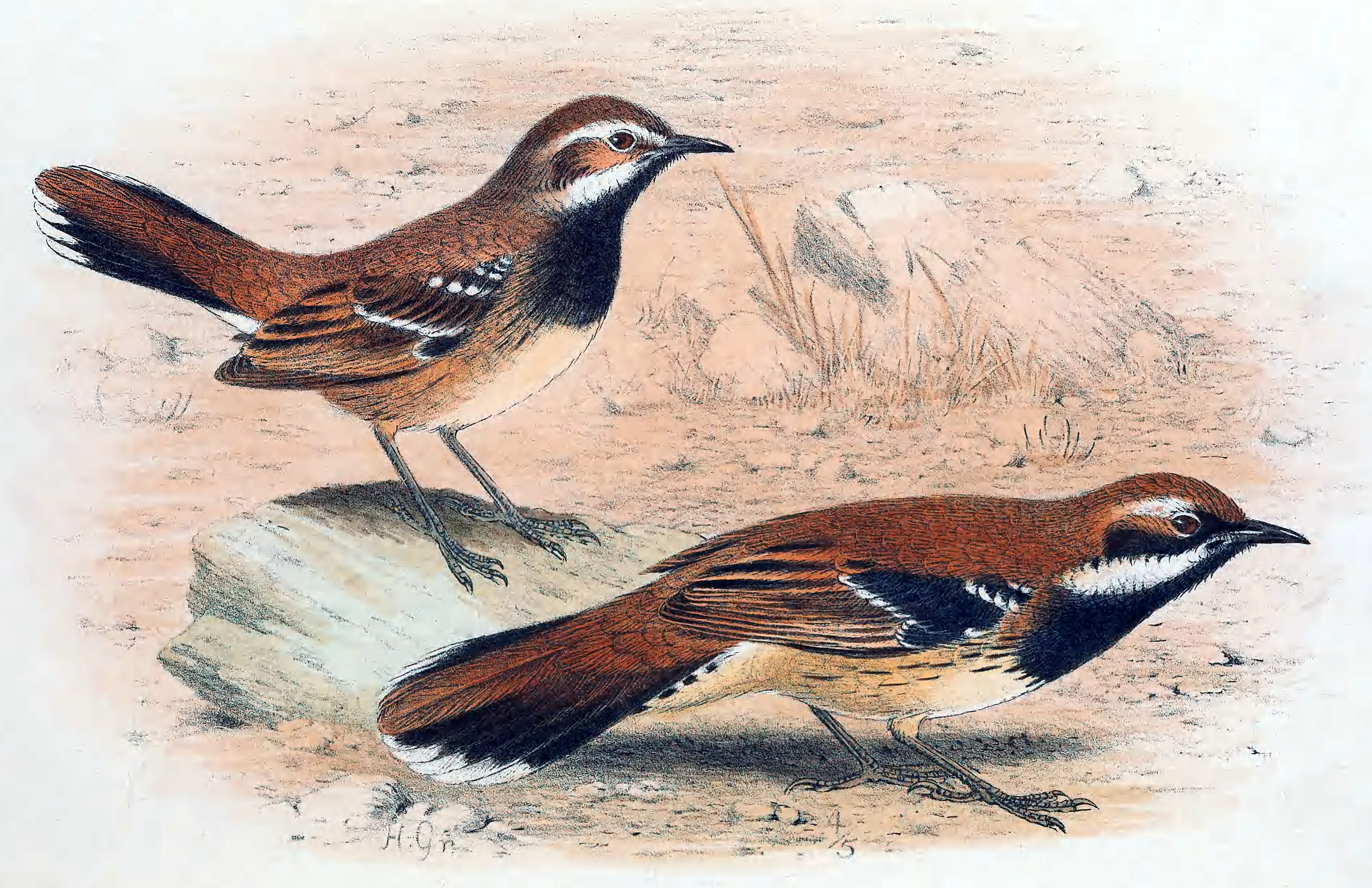
Illustration by Henrik Grönvold, 1910

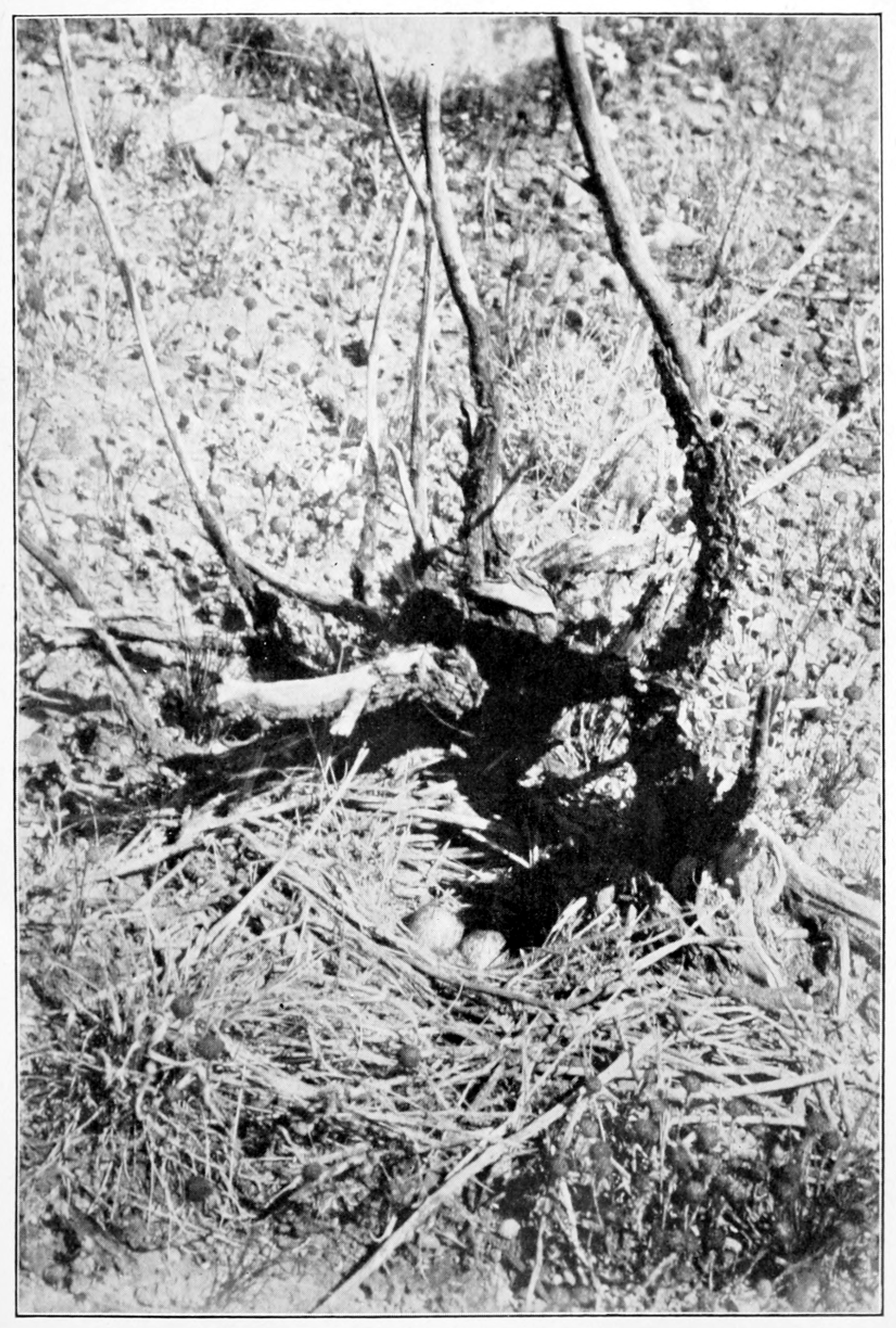
Nest and eggs photographed by F. Lawson Whitlock . The Emu, 1921.
