= Little Sandy =

Little Sandy may refer to:

- Little Sandy, Kentucky, an unincorporated community in Elliott County
- Little Sandy, West Virginia, an unincorporated community in Preston County
- Little Sandy Correctional Complex, in Elliott County, Kentucky
- Little Sandy Desert, in Western Australia
- Little Sandy Pond, in Plymouth, Massachusetts
- Little Sandy River (disambiguation)
