= Sandy Creek =

Sandy Creek may refer to:

== Communities ==
=== Australia ===
- Sandy Creek, South Australia, a town
- Sandy Creek, Queensland a town
- Sandy Creek, Victoria, a locality in the Shire of Indigo

=== United States ===
- Sandy Creek, New York, a town in Oswego County
  - Sandy Creek (village), New York, in the above town
- Sandy Creek, North Carolina, a town in Brunswick County

== Streams ==
=== Australia ===
- Sandy Creek (Arnhem Land)
- Sandy Creek (Queensland), a tributary of Lake Somerset
- Sandy Creek (Central West, New South Wales), a tributary of the Bogan River
- Sandy Creek (Mirrool), an indefinite creek in the Riverina region
- Sandy Creek (Richmond Valley)
- Sandy Creek (South Australia), a tributary of the Pirie-Torrens corridor
- Sandy Creek (South Coast, New South Wales), a tributary of the Bega River
- Sandy Creek (Upper Hunter, New South Wales), a tributary of the Gloucester River
- Sandy Creek (Victoria), multiple streams in Victoria

=== United States ===
- Sandy Creek (Choctawhatchee River), a creek in northeastern Leon County, Florida
- Sandy Creek (Georgia), a creek in northeastern Jackson County, Georgia
- Sandy Creek (Michigan), a tributary of Lake Erie
- Sandy Creek (Apple Creek), a stream in Missouri
- Sandy Creek (Cuivre River), a stream in Missouri
- Sandy Creek (Joachim Creek), a stream in Missouri
- Sandy Creek (New York), in Oswego County, New York
- Sandy Creek (Deep River tributary), a stream in Guilford and Randolph Counties, North Carolina
- Sandy Creek (Middle Fork Coquille River), in Oregon
- Sandy Creek (Ohio), a tributary of the Tuscarawas River
- Sandy Creek (Allegheny River), in northwestern Pennsylvania
- Sandy Creek (Banister River tributary), a stream in Halifax County, Virginia
- Sandy Creek (Ohio River), a tributary of the Ohio River in West Virginia
- Sandy Creek (Texas), a grus creek near Enchanted Rock
- Sandy Creek (Mississippi), a tributary of St. Catherine's Creek

== Other uses ==
- Sandy Creek (horse), a Thoroughbred racehorse
- Sandy Creek station, a light rail station in Pittsburgh, Pennsylvania, United States

== See also ==
- Big Sandy Creek (disambiguation)
- Sandy River (disambiguation)
