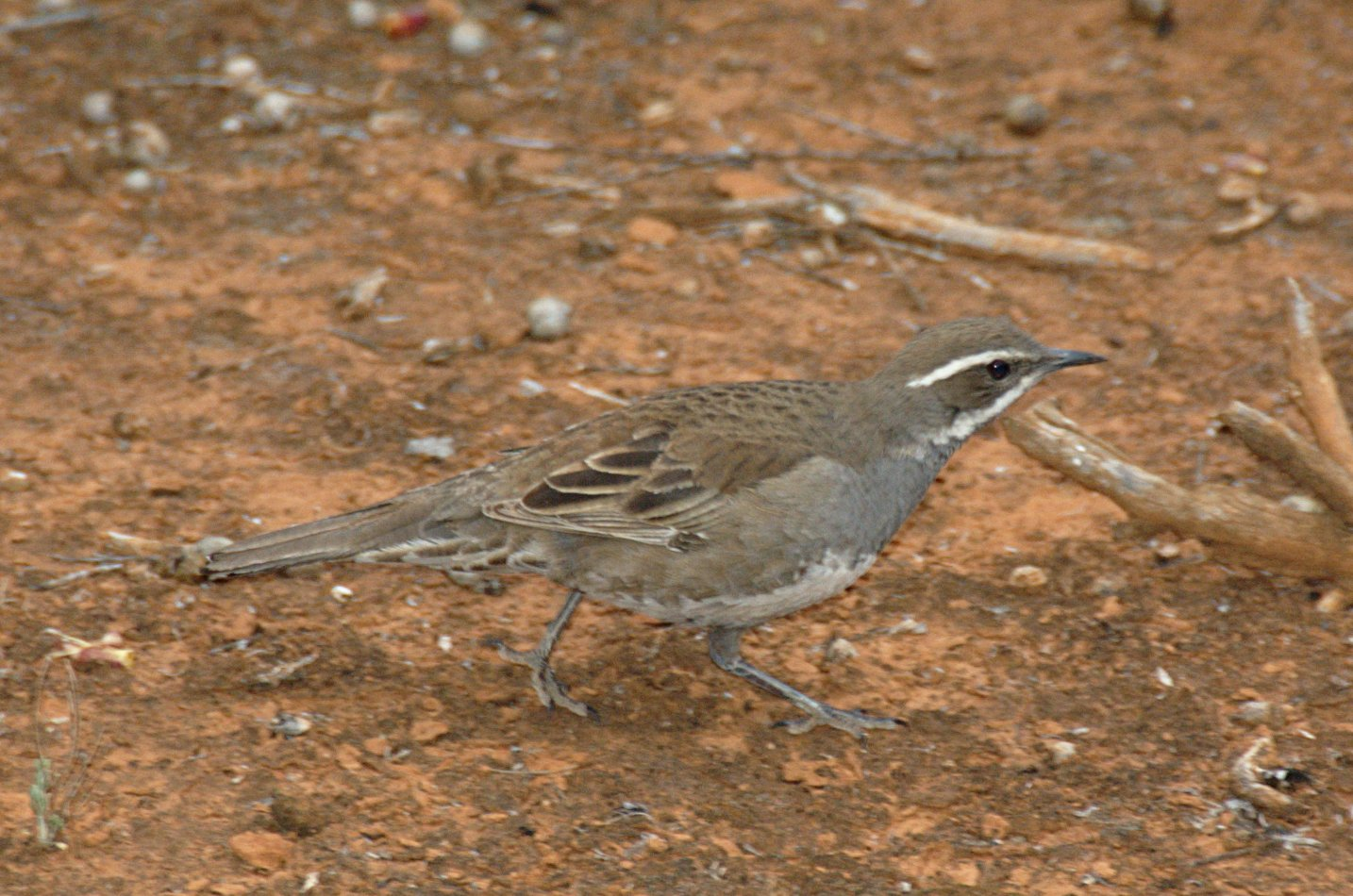
- Chestnut quail-thrush (Cinclosoma castanotum)

Scientific classification
- Kingdom: Animalia
- Phylum: Chordata
- Class: Aves
- Order: Passeriformes
- Family: Cinclosomatidae
- Genus: Cinclosoma; Vigors & Horsfield, 1827

Type species
- Turdus punctatus John Latham 1801= Turdua punctatus Shaw 1794

= Quail-thrush =

Cinclosoma

Genus of birds

A quail-thrush is a bird of the genus Cinclosoma, which contains eight species. Quail-thrushes are in a different family from either quails or thrushes, but bear some superficial resemblance to them. The genus is found in Australia and New Guinea in a variety of habitats ranging from rainforest to deserts.

== Taxonomy ==
The genus Cinclosoma was introduced in 1827 by the naturalists Nicholas Vigors and Thomas Horsfield to accommodate a single species, Turdus punctatus Latham 1801, which becomes the type species by monotypy This is a junior synonym of Turdus punctatus Shaw, 1794, the spotted quail-thrush. The genus name combines the Modern Latin cinclus meaning "thrush" with the Ancient Greek κιγκλος/kinklos, an unidentified tail-wagging waterside bird.

The genus is closely related to the jewel-babblers of New Guinea. A molecular study published in 2015 by Gaynor Dolman and Leo Joseph resulted in the splitting of the chestnut-backed quail-thrush into the chestnut quail-thrush of eastern Australia and the copperback quail-thrush in the west.

== Species ==
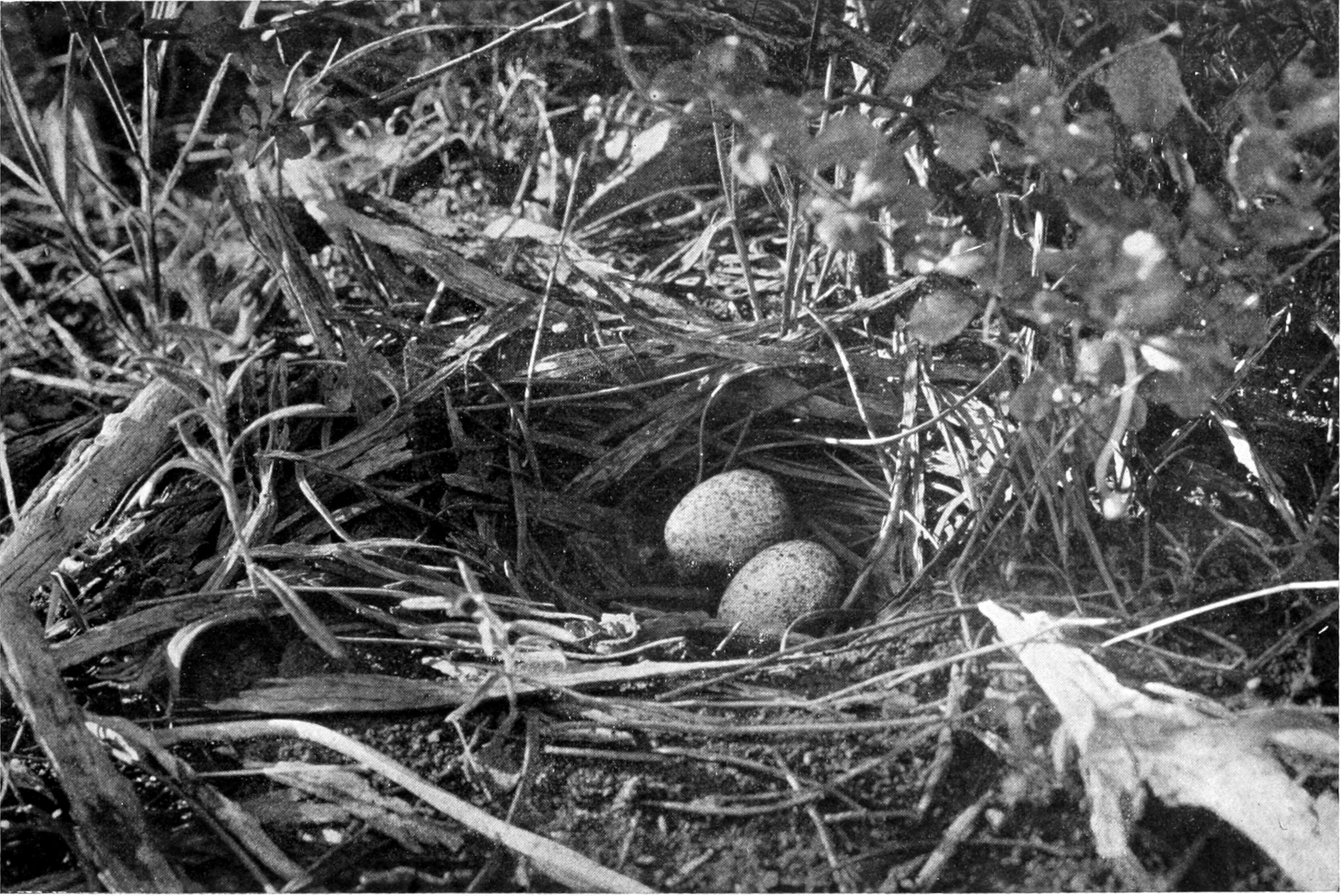
Nest of Cinclosoma marginatum photographed by Whitlock, East Murchison 1909

The genus contains eight species:

Image	Common Name	Scientific name	Distribution
	Painted quail-thrush	Cinclosoma ajax	New Guinea
	Spotted quail-thrush	Cinclosoma punctatum	central-east and southeast Australia and Tasmania
	Copperback quail-thrush	Cinclosoma clarum	central-west to central-south Australia
	Chestnut quail-thrush	Cinclosoma castanotum	southeastern Australia (Yorke Peninsula, southern Flinders Ranges, eastern Mount Lofty Range, northwestern Victoria, and southwestern New South Wales
	Chestnut-breasted quail-thrush	Cinclosoma castaneothorax	east-central Australia (south-central Queensland and northwestern New South Wales)
	Western quail-thrush	Cinclosoma marginatum	west-central Australia (Pilbara region southward to Southern Cross, eastward to southwestern Northern Territory)
	Nullarbor quail-thrush	Cinclosoma alisteri	south-central Australia (Nullarbor Plain)
	Cinnamon quail-thrush	Cinclosoma cinnamomeum	central and central-south Australia
