= Sandy River =

Sandy River may refer to:

== Rivers in the United States ==
- Sandy River (Chandler Bay), Jonesport, Maine
- Sandy River (Kennebec River) in Maine
- Sandy River (Mississippi River), a tributary of the Mississippi River in Minnesota
- Sandy River (Red Lake), a tributary of Lower Red Lake in Minnesota
- Sandy River (Oregon)
- Sandy River (South Carolina)
- Sandy River (Bush River tributary), Virginia
- Sandy River (Dan River tributary), Virginia
- Upper Sandy River, in the Alaska Peninsula National Wildlife Refuge

== Settlements in the United States ==
- Sandy River Plantation, Maine, a municipality in Maine
- Sandy River, Virginia, Pittsylvania County

== See also ==
- Big Sandy River (disambiguation)
- Little Sandy River (disambiguation)
- Sandy River Airport, Sandy, Oregon
- Sandy Rivers
- Sandy Creek (disambiguation)
