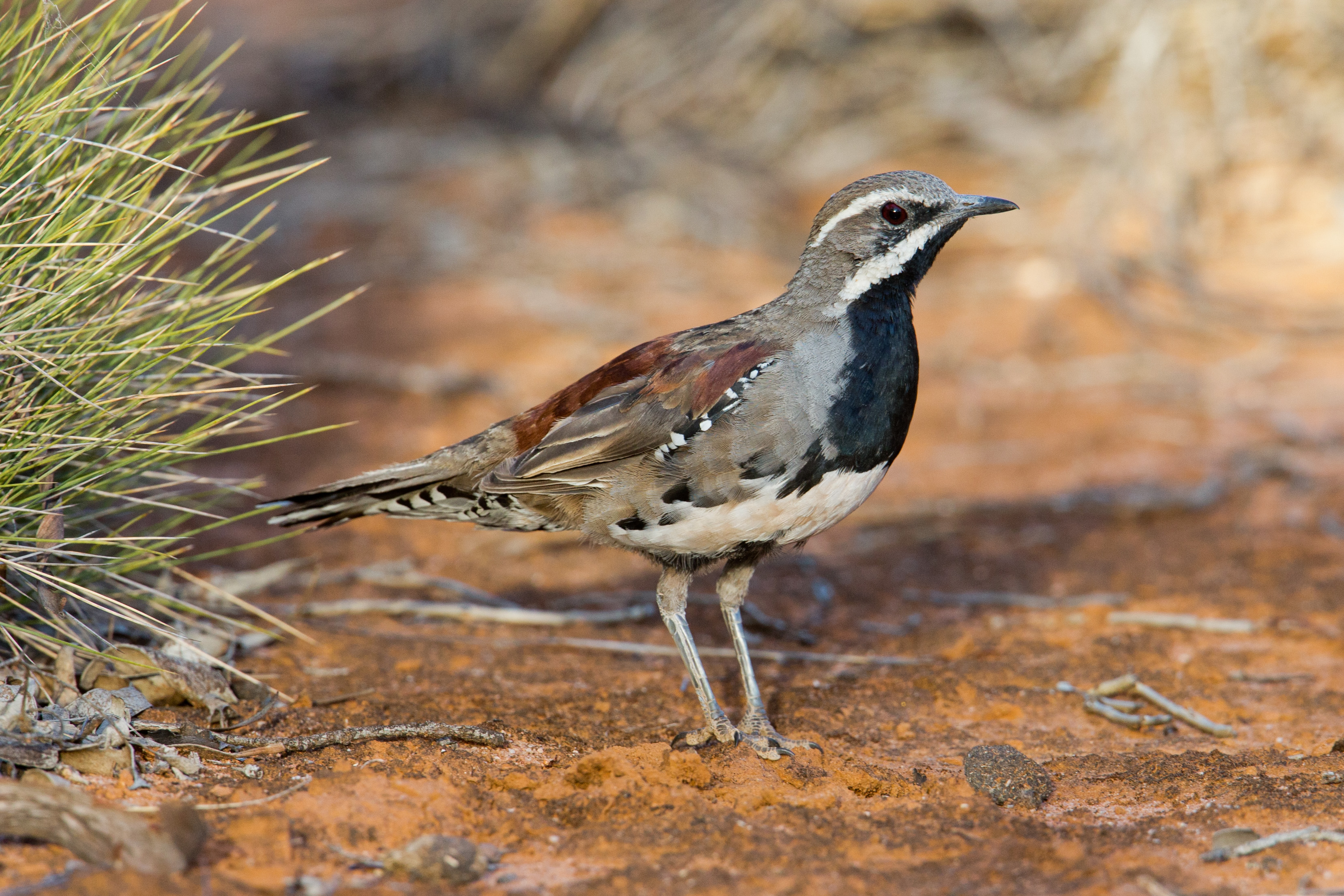

Conservation status
- Least Concern (IUCN 3.1)

Scientific classification
- Kingdom: Animalia
- Phylum: Chordata
- Class: Aves
- Order: Passeriformes
- Family: Cinclosomatidae
- Genus: Cinclosoma
- Species: C. castanotum

Binomial name
- Cinclosoma castanotum Gould, 1840

= Chestnut quail-thrush =

Species of bird

The chestnut quail-thrush (Cinclosoma castanotum) is a native Australian bird of the family Cinclosomatidae. These scrub birds are endemic to Australia and found in all states - barring Tasmania. They are relatively uncommon and are isolated to the semi-arid and arid fringes of the Australian interior.

== Description ==
Similar in physical appearance to other species such as Cinclosoma cinnamomeum and C.c. punctatum, the chestnut quail-thrush is a medium-sized bird that resides in the lower canopy and scrub of arid and semi-arid vegetation. The male is characterised by a black breast, grey flank, and chestnut to grey-brown upper parts with white eyebrow and throat-patch. The female differs with a grey throat and breast, rufous and light brown upper parts, and a yellow-buff eyebrow and mark on throat, presenting an overall duller hue than the male. Both sexes have a white belly. The difference in plumage and body size is attributed to the sexual dimorphism common amongst the Cinclosoma genus. They are known to collect in pairs and small family groups, using scrub and bushes for concealment and song perches, and running swiftly in rocketing bursts when disturbed or alarmed. The chestnut quail-thrush can be distinguished by its high-pitched call, heard as a wheit-wheit-wheit or an insect-like see-see see.

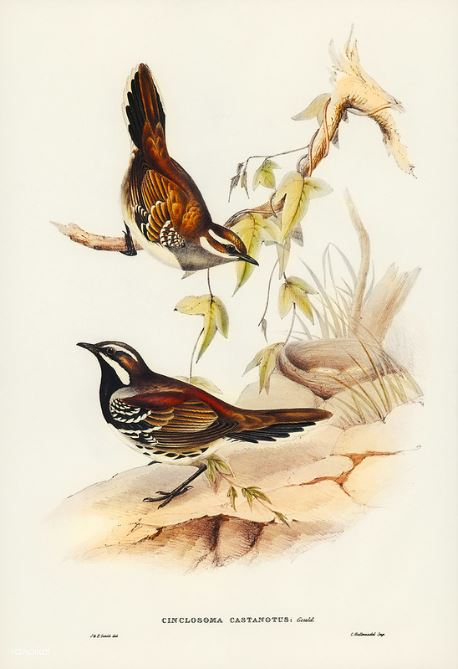
Illustration of male (below) and female (above) chestnut quail-thrush

== Taxonomy ==
The family Cinclosomatidae is characterised by terrestrial birds that prefer the safety of the ground to the wide arena of the air. They are often observed squatting and running along the ground, usually foraging. The birds of this family – those that include jewel-babblers and wedgebills – also prefer the ground for nesting purposes. The Cinclosoma castanotum species was discovered by John Gould in 1840 and was labelled so in order to draw attention to the patch of chestnut on the lower back of the bird. The race marginatum is the 'western quail-thrush' – adopting a richer plumage and found around much of inland Western Australia. The specific epithet castanotum derives from the Greek kastanon meaning 'chestnut' and noton meaning 'the back'.

The other quail-thrushes that share the same genus are distributed through the arid and semi-arid areas of Central Australia, as well as more temperate and tropical areas in northern Australia and New Guinea. The most notable species include the painted quail-thrush (Cinclosoma ajax), spotted quail-thrush (C.c. punctatum), chestnut quail-thrush (C.c. castanotum), cinnamon quail-thrush (C.c. cinnamomeum), and chestnut-breasted quail-thrush (C.c. castaneothorax).

It has been suggested that the quail-thrush found in arid zones originate from their forest ancestors in the tropical reaches of northern Australia and the New Guinea lowlands, changing as the climate shifted from a wetter to a cooler, dryer climate in the late Miocene. Despite this, there remains some debate as to the origin and taxonomical relationship between the arid and tropical species due to the stark difference in habitat and environment.

A study in 2015 found the divergence between species using mitochondrial DNA (mtDNA), characterising each group through spatial and phylogenetic qualities. The study concluded that populations of Cinclosoma castanotum east of the Eyrean Barrier were to retain their original taxonomical designation, while those west of the Eyrean Barrier were split into C. c. clarum (since 2015 recognised as copperbacked quail-thrush, C. clarum), C. c. fordianum or into phenotypically intermediate subspecies. In addition to the divergence in mtDNA, there was a difference in dorsal colouration caused by sexual dimorphism in species found to the east and west of the Eyrean Barrier – helping to define the taxonomical separations.

== Distribution and habitat ==
The chestnut quail-thrush occurs in a relatively large area across the interior of Australia, covering both semi-arid and arid landscapes. It inhabits central Queensland, extending down through western New South Wales and continuing south as far as Cobar. The distribution and habitats of the chestnut quail-thrush are naturally fragmented due to natural landscape breaks, such as those that do not support mallee or heathland and thus a lack of suitable habitat.

The traditional habitat of the chestnut quail-thrush is scrub and low-lying vegetation, such as mulga-eucalyptus and acacias that reside on stony ground, as well as grevilleas and tea trees on rocky hillocks. There is a variance between the habitat preferred by the chestnut quail-thrush in NSW and those in WA, with the former occurring exclusively in mallee woodlands that feature spinifex and acacia shrubs, while the latter occupies an understorey habitat characterised by sclerophyll woodlands, acacia shrubs and heathland. Their relationship to fire regimes varies with the highest densities occurring between two and fifteen years, while densities have been observed to drop when fire intervals fall below two years.

== Behaviour and diet ==
The chestnut quail-thrush is a largely ground-based bird that favours the understorey over the canopy in order to forage, nest and hide from predators. They are a locally nomadic bird that prefers to run than fly – with or without disturbance. They are a diurnal species that forages during the day and are often seen in pairs or small family groups when foraging, nesting or singing. It has been observed that, as with other quail-thrush, they can be easily confused with a babbler when running. Easily disturbed from external activity, the chestnut quail-thrush is difficult to follow and has a practiced skill in hiding in undergrowth and scrub when threatened.

The Cinclosoma castanotum is an omnivore species that feeds on a combination of ground-laden insects and seeds. They are often observed foraging through clumps of spinifex chasing insects such as grasshoppers, beetles and caterpillars, both native and exotic seed, as well as the fruit of various native plants.

== Reproduction ==
Chestnut quail-thrush adopt the same breeding season as other quail-thrush – July to December – with the males singing from daybreak throughout the breeding season In between August and December (depending on rainfall) they lay 2 or 3 eggs that are cream to white in colour with blackish brown spots covering the surface. They are a ground-nesting bird that makes their nest in a small depression using surrounding foliage and vegetation, such as bark, grass and sticks.

== Threats and conservation ==
The chestnut quail-thrush is listed as Least Concern under the IUCN guidelines and is in no immediate danger of extinction. Despite this, it has gone into decline in some parts of Western Australia. This decline spreads along the western range of the marginatum contingent, specifically Kellerberrin, Dryandra and large parts of the wheatbelt. In areas of NSW the population trend appears to be falling as well, though not fast enough to warrant a change to Vulnerable under the population trend criteria.

The species – and genus at large - are vulnerable to a variety of threats, including: land clearing leading to habitat loss, fragmentation and genetic isolation; the degradation of habitat due to adjacent or immediate human activity; predation from invasive pests, such as cats and foxes; the direct and indirect challenges faced by inappropriate fire regimes, including rapid landscape change; and the unknown future threats driven by anthropogenic climate change.

Potential conservation assistance strategies have been suggested, centring on reducing the stocking rates in and around potential and real habitat; retention of remnant grasslands and shrubland, aggressive control of invasive predators, and the implementation and maintenance of a sustainable fire plan.
