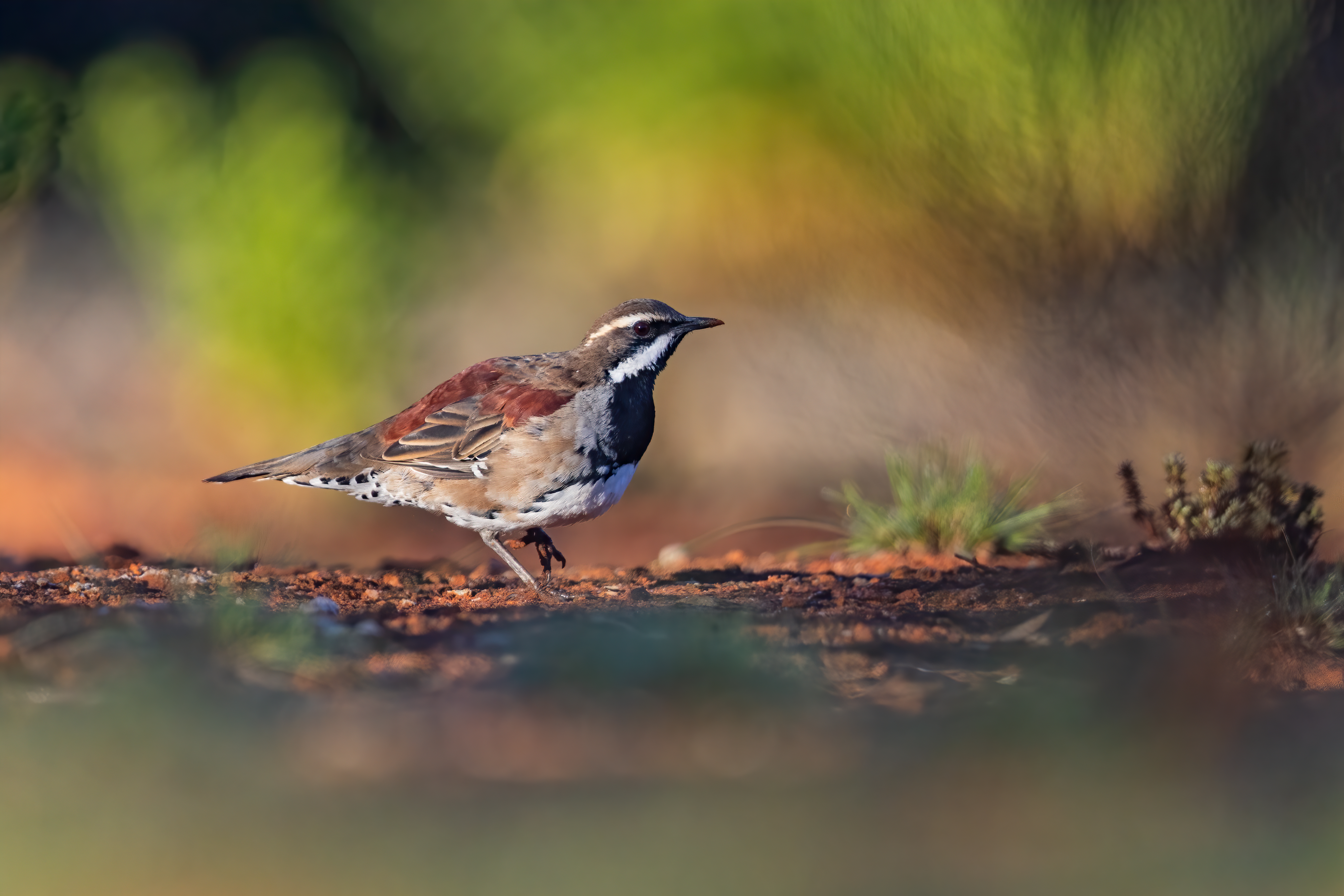

Scientific classification
- Kingdom: Animalia
- Phylum: Chordata
- Class: Aves
- Order: Passeriformes
- Family: Cinclosomatidae
- Genus: Cinclosoma
- Species: C. clarum

Binomial name
- Cinclosoma clarum Morgan, 1926

Subspecies
- C. c. clarum; C. c. fordianum; C. c. morgani

= Copperback quail-thrush =

Species of bird

The copperback quail-thrush (Cinclosoma clarum) is a species of bird in the family Cinclosomatidae. It was split from the chestnut quail-thrush in 2015. It is endemic to Australia. Its natural habitat is Mediterranean-type shrubby vegetation.

== Subspecies ==
- C. c. clarum: little to no sexual dimorphism. They tend to be brown with rust-colored back bands.
- C. c. fordianum: does exhibit sexual dimorphism. Males are gray with dark brown streaks; females are usually brownish-gray with similar patterning. Some females have a faint, narrow back band, and some have none at all.
- C. c. morgani: Eyre Peninsula
