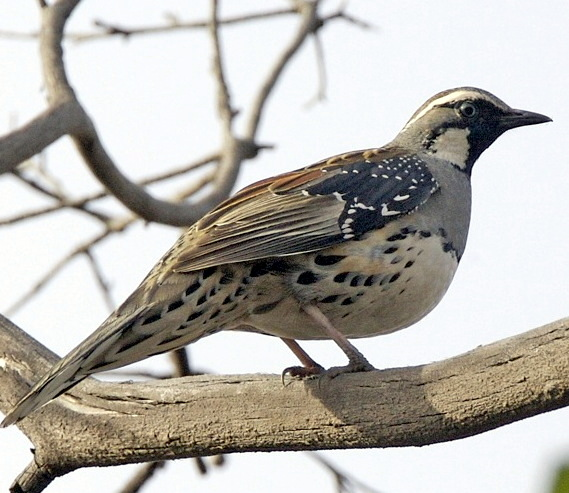
- Spotted quail-thrush (Cinclosoma punctatum)

Scientific classification
- Kingdom: Animalia
- Phylum: Chordata
- Class: Aves
- Order: Passeriformes
- Infraorder: Corvides
- Family: Cinclosomatidae; Mathews, 1921

Genera
- See list below

= Cinclosomatidae =

Family of birds

Cinclosomatidae is a family of passerine birds native to Australia and New Guinea. It has a complicated taxonomic history and different authors vary in which birds they include in the family. It includes the quail-thrushes and jewel-babblers.

== Taxonomy ==
The quail-thrushes, jewel-babblers, whipbirds and wedgebills were traditionally included with the logrunners (Orthonyx) in the family Orthonychidae. Sometimes the Malaysian rail-babbler and blue-capped ifrit (Ifrita kowaldi) were also included in the family. In 1985, Sibley and Ahlquist found that the logrunners were not related to the others and included only the logrunners in the Orthonychidae. They treated the others as the subfamily Cinclosomatinae within their expanded family Corvidae.

A number of authors later treated the quail-thrushes and allies as the family Cinclosomatidae, a name coined by Gregory Mathews in 1921–1922. However, if the whipbirds are included in the family, the older name Psophodidae Bonaparte, 1854 has priority. If the Malaysian rail-babbler is also included, the name Eupetidae Bonaparte, 1850 has priority.

The Malaysian rail-babbler has now been shown to be unrelated to the others, probably being an early offshoot of the Passerida. Another study found the quail-thrushes and jewel-babblers to be related to each other but did not show them to have a close relationship with Psophodes or Ifrita.

== Description ==
The quail-thrushes and jewel babblers are medium-sized songbirds, 17–28 cm in length. They have strong legs and bills. Males and females often differ in plumage markings. The quail-thrushes are largely brown above, the colour varying to provide camouflage against the soil, but are more boldly marked with black and white below. Jewel-babblers usually have extensive blue in their plumage. Most species have loud, distinctive songs.

== Distribution and habitat ==
Jewel-babblers are found on New Guinea and the neighbouring islands of Yapen, Batanta, Misool and Salawati. They occur in forest, generally replacing each other at different altitudes. The painted quail-thrush is also found in the forests of New Guinea. The other quail-thrushes are restricted to Australia where they are found in drier habitats, occurring in open forest, scrub and on stony ground. None of the species are thought to be threatened but one subspecies of the spotted quail-thrush is certainly critically endangered and possibly extinct.

== Behaviour ==
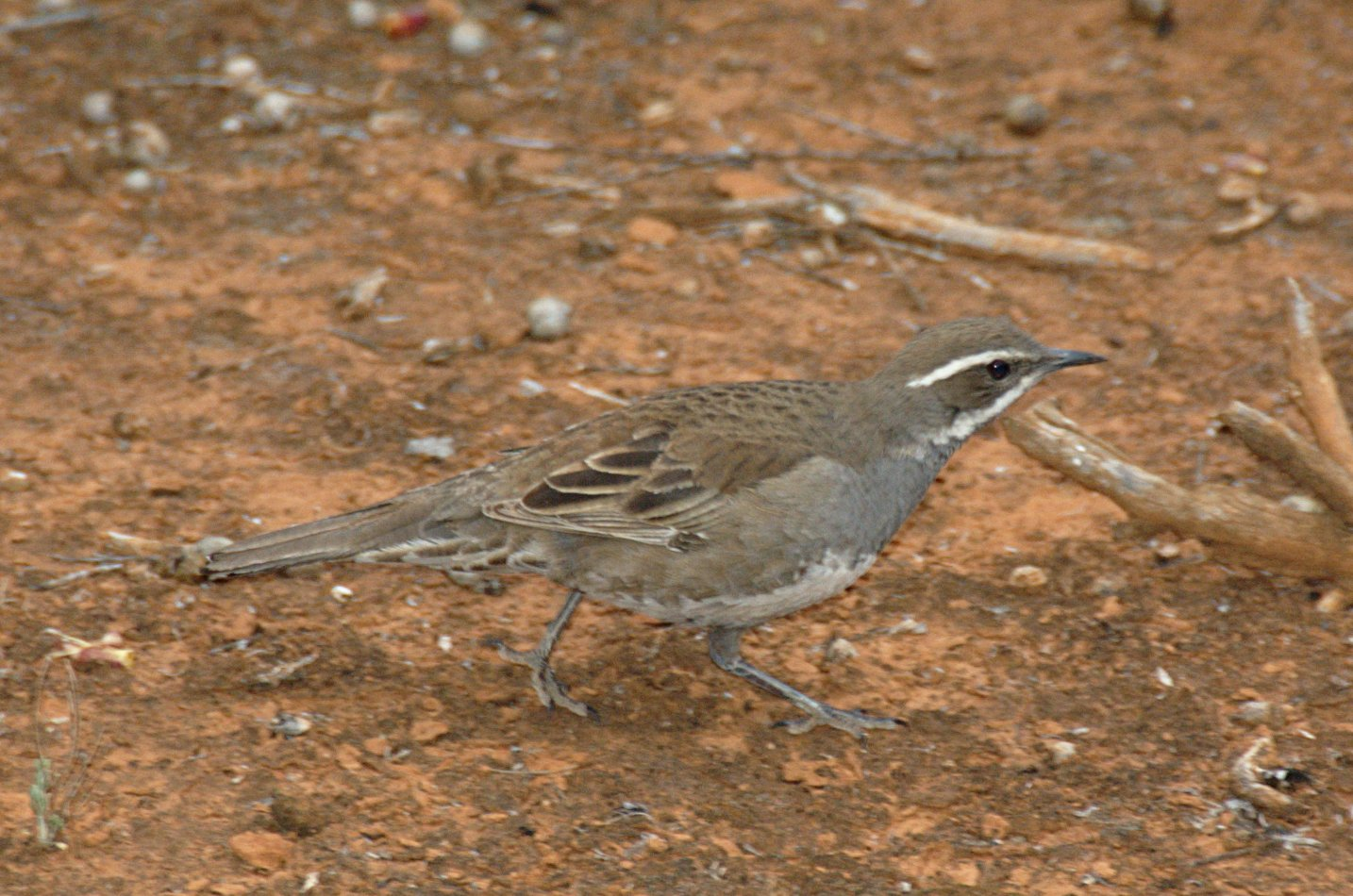
Chestnut-backed quail-thrush (Cinclosoma castanotum)

Jewel-babblers and quail-thrushes are terrestrial birds which fly fairly weakly and prefer to squat or run when disturbed. They forage on the ground feeding mainly on insects and other invertebrates. In the desert, quail-thrushes also eat some seeds.

They build a cup-shaped nest among shrubs or on the ground. Two or three eggs are laid.

== Species list ==
- Genus Cinclosoma – quail-thrushes
  - Painted quail-thrush, Cinclosoma ajax
  - Spotted quail-thrush, Cinclosoma punctatum
  - Chestnut quail-thrush, Cinclosoma castanotum
  - Copperback quail-thrush, Cinclosoma clarum
  - Chestnut-breasted quail-thrush, Cinclosoma castaneothorax
  - Western quail-thrush, Cinclosoma marginatum
  - Nullarbor quail-thrush, Cinclosoma alisteri
  - Cinnamon quail-thrush, Cinclosoma cinnamomeum
- Genus Ptilorrhoa – jewel-babblers
  - Spotted jewel-babbler, Ptilorrhoa leucosticta
  - Northern blue jewel-babbler, Ptilorrhoa caerulescens
  - Brown-headed jewel-babbler, Ptilorrhoa geislerorum
  - Chestnut-backed jewel-babbler, Ptilorrhoa castanonota
  - Southern blue jewel-babbler, Ptilorrhoa nigricrissus
  - Hooded jewel-babbler, Ptilorrhoa urrissia
