= Big Sandy Creek =

Big Sandy Creek is the name of several tributaries in the United States:

- Big Sandy Creek (Colorado), a tributary of the Arkansas River
- Big Sandy Creek (Montana), a tributary of the Milk River
- Big Sandy Creek (Niobrara River tributary), a stream in Holt County, Nebraska
- Big Sandy Creek (Little Blue River tributary), a stream in Thayer County, Nebraska
- Big Sandy Creek (Sabine River tributary), a tributary in Texas
- Big Sandy Creek (Trinity River), a tributary in Texas
- Big Sandy Creek (Village Creek), a tributary in Texas
- Big Sandy Creek (Cheat River tributary), a tributary in West Virginia
- Big Sandy River (Wyoming) or Big Sandy Creek, a tributary of the Green River
- Big Sandy Creek (Illinois), a tributary of the Illinois River

== See also ==
- Big Sandy River (disambiguation)
- Sandy Creek (disambiguation)
