= Painted quail-thrush =

Conservation status
- Least Concern (IUCN 3.1)

Scientific classification
- Kingdom: Animalia
- Phylum: Chordata
- Class: Aves
- Order: Passeriformes
- Family: Cinclosomatidae
- Genus: Cinclosoma
- Species: C. ajax

Binomial name
- Cinclosoma ajax (Temminck, 1836)

Species of bird

The painted quail-thrush (Cinclosoma ajax) is a species of bird in the family Cinclosomatidae. It is found in New Guinea. Its natural habitat is subtropical or tropical moist lowland forest.

== Description ==
The painted quail-thrush is a medium sized bird, measuring 20-25 cm (8-10 in) in length, with a usual wing span of 20-30 cm (8-10 in) It has a brown tail, crown and back, black mask with a white belly and burnt orange sides. Males have a black throat and chest, with a white stripe on their face, the females however, have a white throat and a white eyebrow.
