= Sandy Creek (Mississippi) =

Homochitto River tributary

Coordinates: 31°22′10″N 91°14′43″W

Sandy Creek is a right-bank tributary of the Homochitto River in Adams County, Mississippi, United States. Sandy Creek was one of the first places where white settlers and their black slaves set up farming in the colonial-era Natchez District. The Sandy Creek Wildlife Management Area, part of the Homochitto National Forest, is believed to host a population of Louisiana black bear.
