= Little Sandy River =

Little Sandy River may refer to:

- Little Sandy River (Kentucky), a tributary of the Ohio River
- Little Sandy River (Oregon), a tributary of the Bull Run River
- Little Sandy River (South Carolina), a tributary of the Broad River

== See also ==
- Big Sandy River (disambiguation)
- Sandy River (disambiguation)
