= Big Sandy River =

The Big Sandy River may refer to one of the following rivers in the United States:

- The Big Sandy River (Ohio River), on the border between Kentucky and West Virginia
- The Big Sandy River (Tennessee), a tributary of the Tennessee River
- The Big Sandy River (Wyoming), a tributary of the Green River
- The Big Sandy River (Arizona), a tributary of the Bill Williams River

== See also ==
- Big Sandy Creek (disambiguation)
- Little Sandy River (disambiguation)
- Sandy River (disambiguation)
