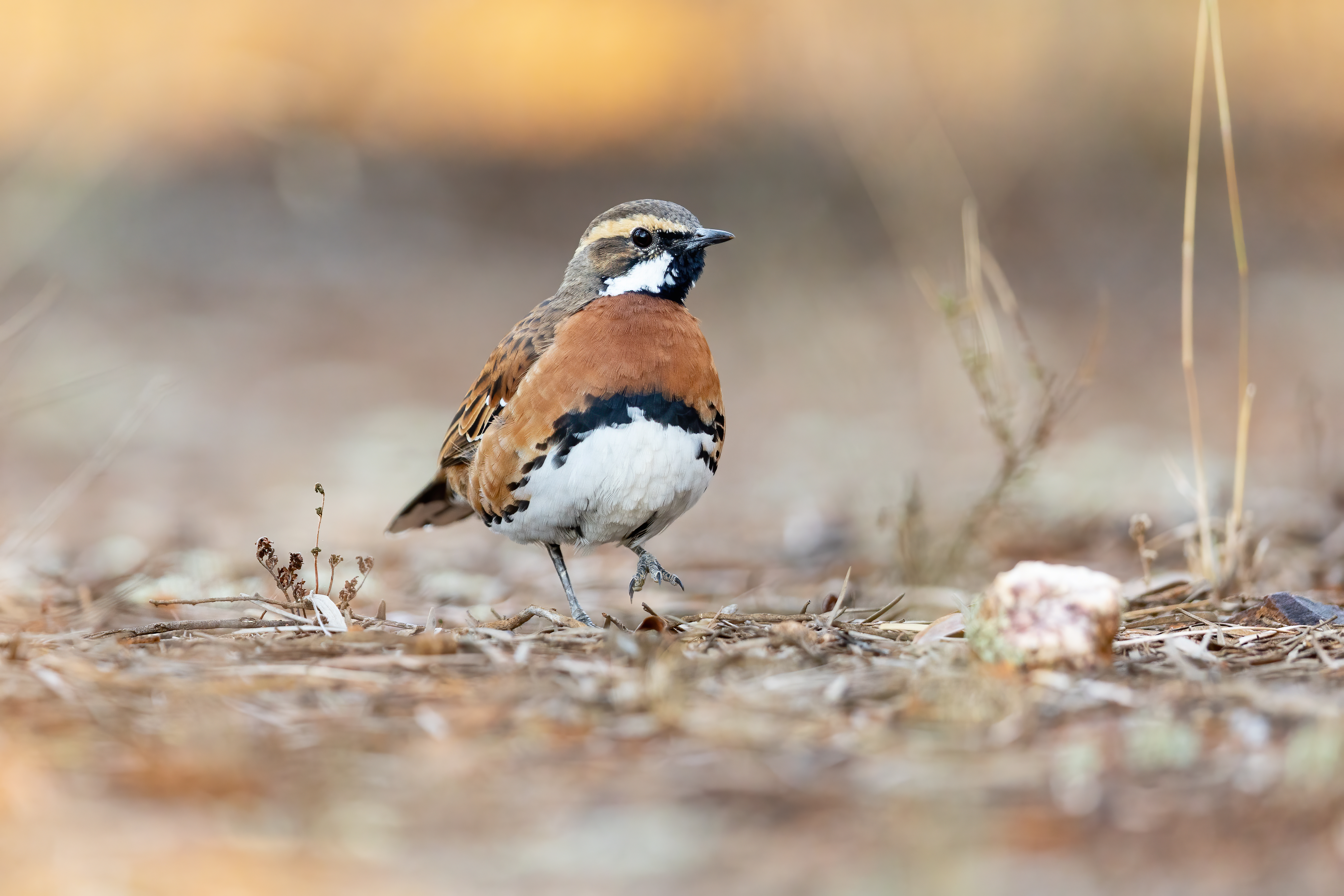
- Male
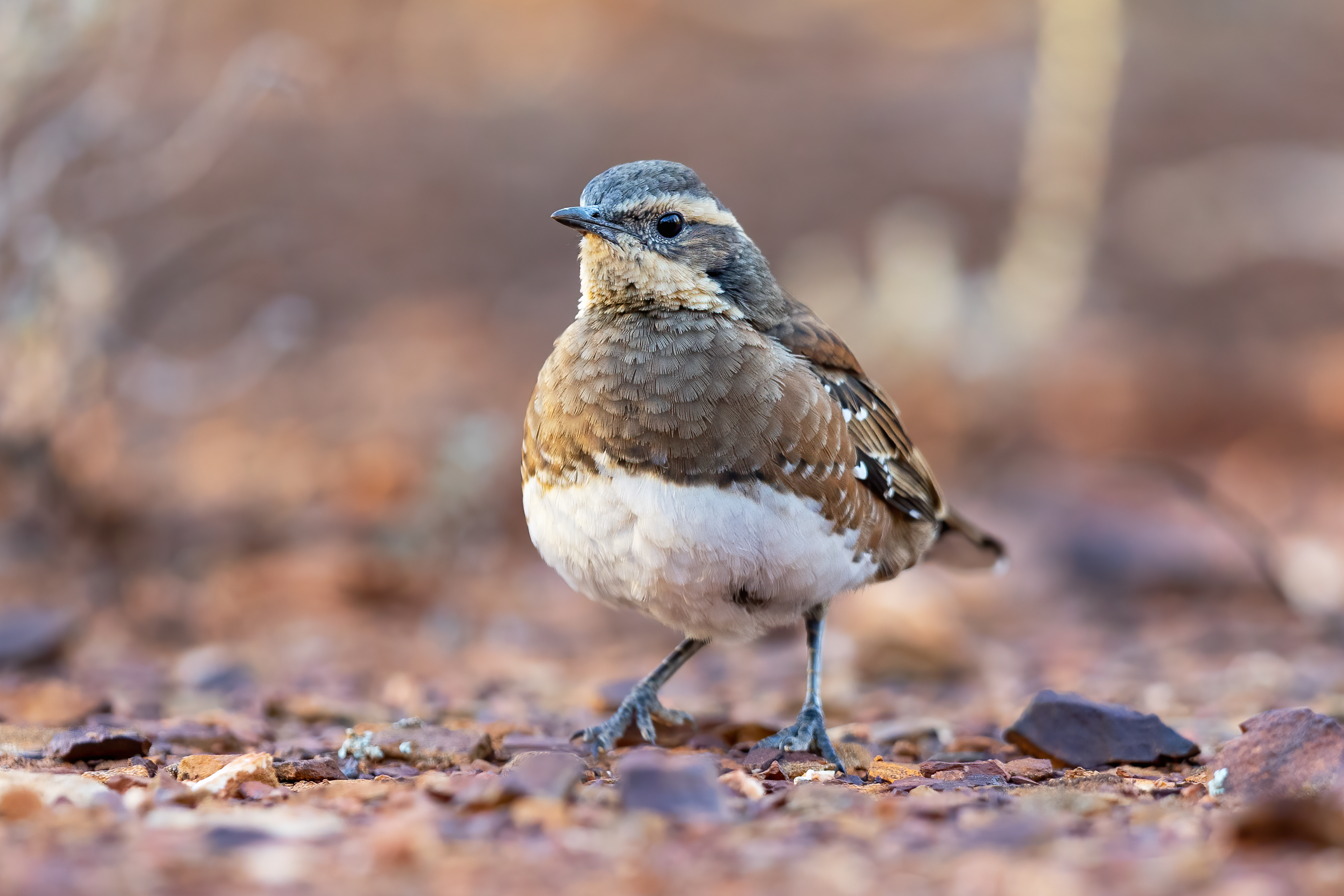
- Female

Conservation status
- Least Concern (IUCN 3.1)

Scientific classification
- Kingdom: Animalia
- Phylum: Chordata
- Class: Aves
- Order: Passeriformes
- Family: Cinclosomatidae
- Genus: Cinclosoma
- Species: C. castaneothorax

Binomial name
- Cinclosoma castaneothorax Gould, 1849

= Chestnut-breasted quail-thrush =

Species of bird

The chestnut-breasted quail-thrush (Cinclosoma castaneothorax) is a small endemic Australian bird which is predominantly found within the semi-arid deserts of New South Wales and Queensland.

== Distribution ==
The chestnut-breasted quail-thrush is found in Northwestern New South Wales and Southwestern Queensland. It occurs predominantly within semi-arid zones featuring sparse woody shrubs, herbaceous vegetation and hummock grasses.

== Breeding ==
The chestnut-breasted quail-thrush breeds during the winter semester. Eggs have been reported being laid at the end of months which have received heavy rain in the early weeks.

== Nesting ==
The chestnut-breasted quail-thrush predominantly lays two eggs per clutch in a nest located on the ground in a slight depression. It is usually 5 cm deep and 15 cm wide and constructed of mulga leaves and hop-bush bark (Dodonoea adenophora). The nests are hidden amongst a low hop-bush which was part of a Mulga-Box association. The nest is usually hidden behind a curtain of leaves and bark.

The nests are frequented by related mature and juvenile individuals; however, only the mature individuals feed the young. If juveniles come too close to the nest they are often chased away by the mature male. Juveniles are distinguishable by their smaller size and incomplete bar below the chestnut breast.

All nest attendees, including hatchlings will render themselves motionless in the presence of predators such as crows Corvus orru and the wedge-tailed eagle Aquila audax. They have also been known to chase away crested bellbirds Oreoica gutturalis, grey-crowned babblers Pomatostomus temporalis, chestnut-crowned babblers Pomatostomus ruficeps and Hall's babblers Pomatostomus halli.

== Call ==
Common call: Piping whistle of two and three short notes. This is not made by the female. When alarmed: One or two insect-like noises, sounding similar to the call of the Myzomela nigra. This is made by both sexes.

== Taxonomy ==
Cinclosoma is best described as two clusters of taxa. The first most closely related cluster consisting of C. cinnamomeum, C. alisteri, C. castaneothorax and C. marginatum. The second cluster which is less related consists of C. punctatum, C. ajax and C. castanotum. The first cluster has developed due to allopatric speciation and sub-speciation within Australia's deserts. The second cluster has occurred due to parapatry between semi-arid and wet country. The territories of many subspecies overlap both temporally and spatially, yet the parapatric borders between C. cinnamomeum and C. castaneothorax coincide with sharp environmental changes removing competition between the two species. It is believed that all Cinclosoma taxa share a common ancestor which lived in Australia's warm wet forests. Its descendants spread across Australia's deserts through a leapfrog distribution pattern of evolution. This pattern of distribution is believed to be the reason for all semi-arid Cinclosoma taxa sharing camouflaged plumage.

== Sexual dimorphism ==
Male and female chestnut-breasted quail-thrushes are identifiable due to their different plumage.

• Male plumage: glossy black throat; rich rust-red breast band edged with black; eyebrow buff; the rump and back are a deep rust-red, black underside.

• Female plumage: Throat and malar region are orange-buff, eyebrow is the same colour. The breast is pale brown and merges into a dull cinnamon on the flanks. Underside is an olive-brown and rump is reddish-brown with indistinct darker streaks.
