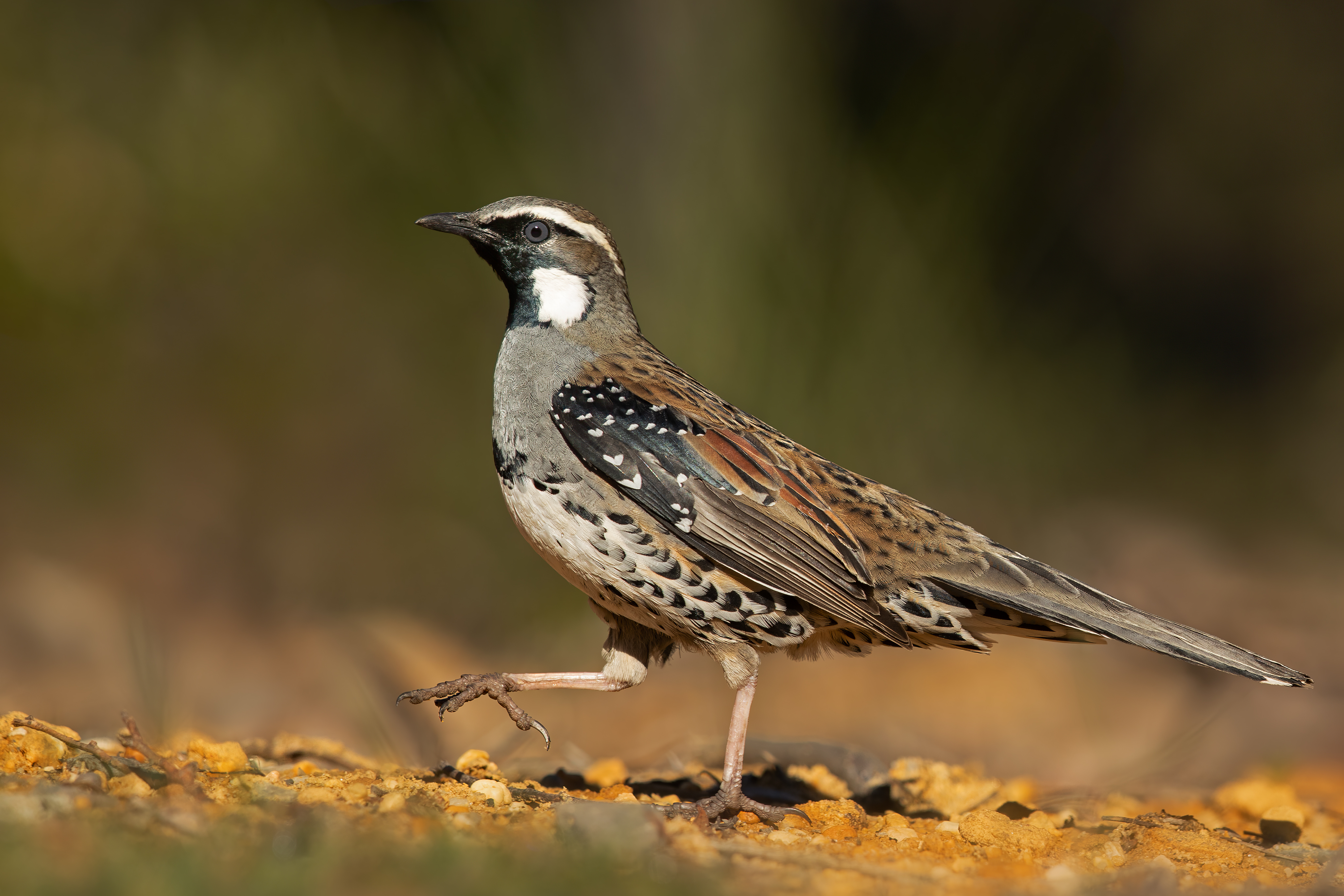

Conservation status
- Least Concern (IUCN 3.1)

Scientific classification
- Kingdom: Animalia
- Phylum: Chordata
- Class: Aves
- Order: Passeriformes
- Family: Cinclosomatidae
- Genus: Cinclosoma
- Species: C. punctatum

Binomial name
- Cinclosoma punctatum (Shaw, 1795)

= Spotted quail-thrush =

Species of bird

The spotted quail-thrush (Cinclosoma punctatum) is a species of bird in the family Cinclosomatidae. It is endemic to Australia.

Its natural habitat is subtropical, tropical and temperate dry forest.

It is generally cryptic and terrestrial.
