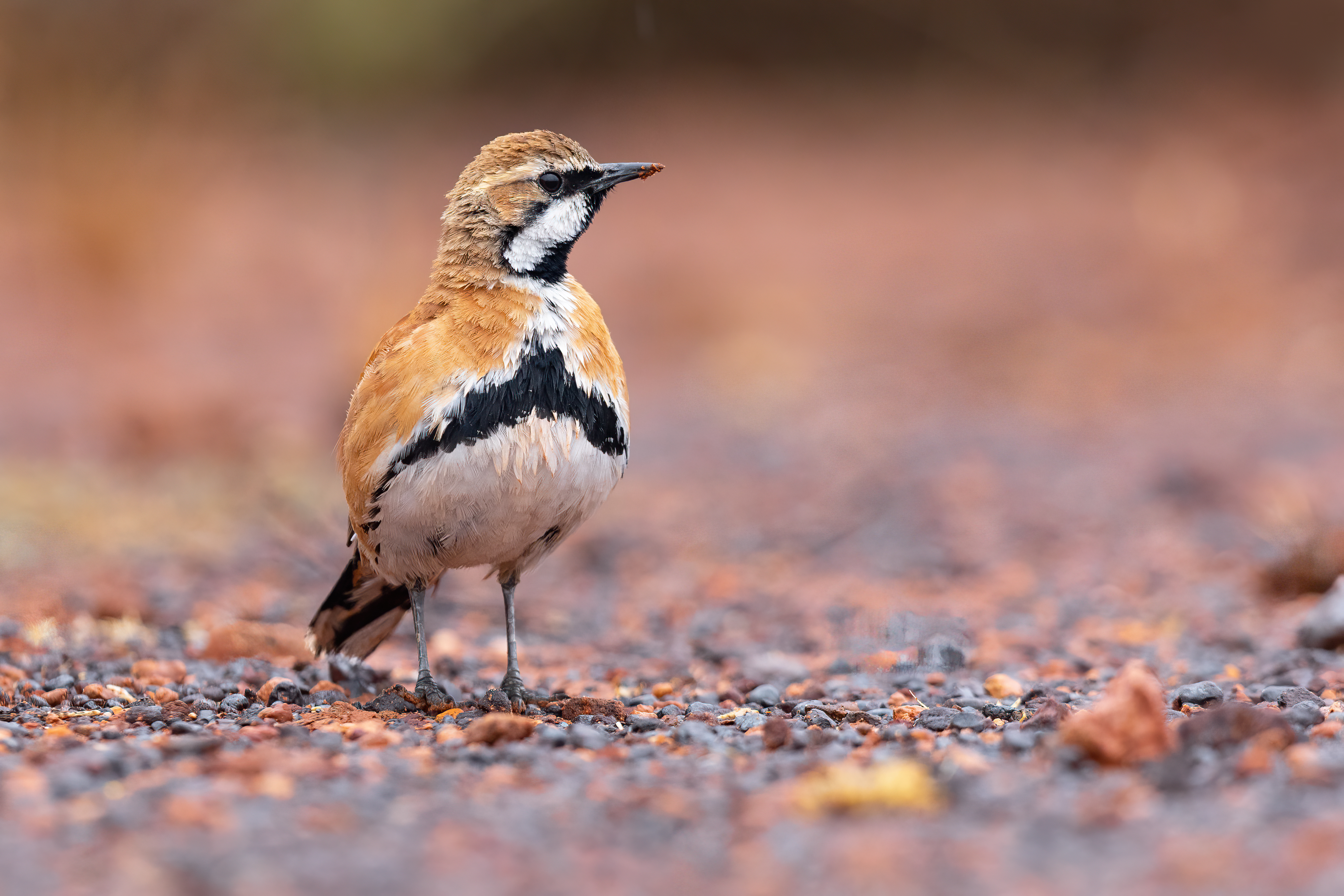

Conservation status
- Least Concern (IUCN 3.1)

Scientific classification
- Kingdom: Animalia
- Phylum: Chordata
- Class: Aves
- Order: Passeriformes
- Family: Cinclosomatidae
- Genus: Cinclosoma
- Species: C. cinnamomeum

Binomial name
- Cinclosoma cinnamomeum Gould, 1846

= Cinnamon quail-thrush =

Species of bird

The cinnamon quail-thrush (Cinclosoma cinnamomeum) is a small to medium-sized species of bird that is endemic to Australia. This bird is found in the arid and semi-arid regions of central Australia.

== Taxonomy ==
This species is a member of the family Cinclosomatidae, which is a group of passerine birds native to Australia and nearby areas. The quail-thrushes (Cinclosoma), which the cinnamon quail-thrush is a member of, belong to this family.

== Description ==
Cinnamon quail-thrush have a body length of 20 cm (7.9 in), and weigh up to 50 grams (1.8 oz) when fully grown. Male birds are characterised by a white eyebrow, black face, and a broad white streak down the sides of a black throat. The upper parts of their body are plain cinnamon-rufous with buff-white patches on the upper breast and a broad black band below. The outer tail feathers are black with white tips. The female has similar features but duller with a buff-white throat and eyebrow. Their upper breast is grey and they have no black on the underside. Juveniles have the same markings but males may have an indistinct breast band. They have high-pitched, slightly hissing calls (voices).

== Distribution and habitat ==
The cinnamon quail-thrush is an Australian endemic that is typically found in arid and semi-arid regions of central Australia. These regions are defined by the presence of desert vegetation and land forms as well as by low rainfall, with less than 500 mm (20 in) per annum in most areas. Its distribution size is estimated to be 831,000 km^{2} (321,000 sq mi), spanning over southwest Queensland, northwest New South Wales, northeastern South Australia and the southeast of the Northern Territory. Within these areas the cinnamon quail-thrush has been found in grass and shrublands; however, it is more commonly found among dry stony areas, especially around dry creek lines.

== Behaviour and ecology ==
=== Behaviour ===
These terrestrial birds are fairly weak fliers and prefer to squat or run when disturbed.

=== Diet ===
Cinnamon quail-thrushes are exclusively ground foragers, eating a wide range of invertebrates (including grasshoppers, bugs, beetles, flies and ants), and seeds of both native and introduced flora species.

=== Breeding ===
These birds are found alone, in pairs or small family groups. Males sing continuously at daybreak in the breeding season, which is normally in the months of July to September. Breeding occurs on the ground, with cup-shaped nests being built in depressions and lined with strips of bark, fine grass or sticks. The nest is usually located amongst rocky areas, against fallen branches or under low bushes or sparse tufts of grass. The clutch can contain two or three eggs.

=== Migration ===
There is no evidence of the cinnamon quail-thrush having large-scale seasonal movements.

== Conservation status ==
While the cinnamon quail-thrush's population has not been measured, it is thought that the species is slowly declining due to ongoing habitat degradation caused by livestock and introduced herbivores. The species is evaluated as least concern on the IUCN Red List of Threatened Species.
