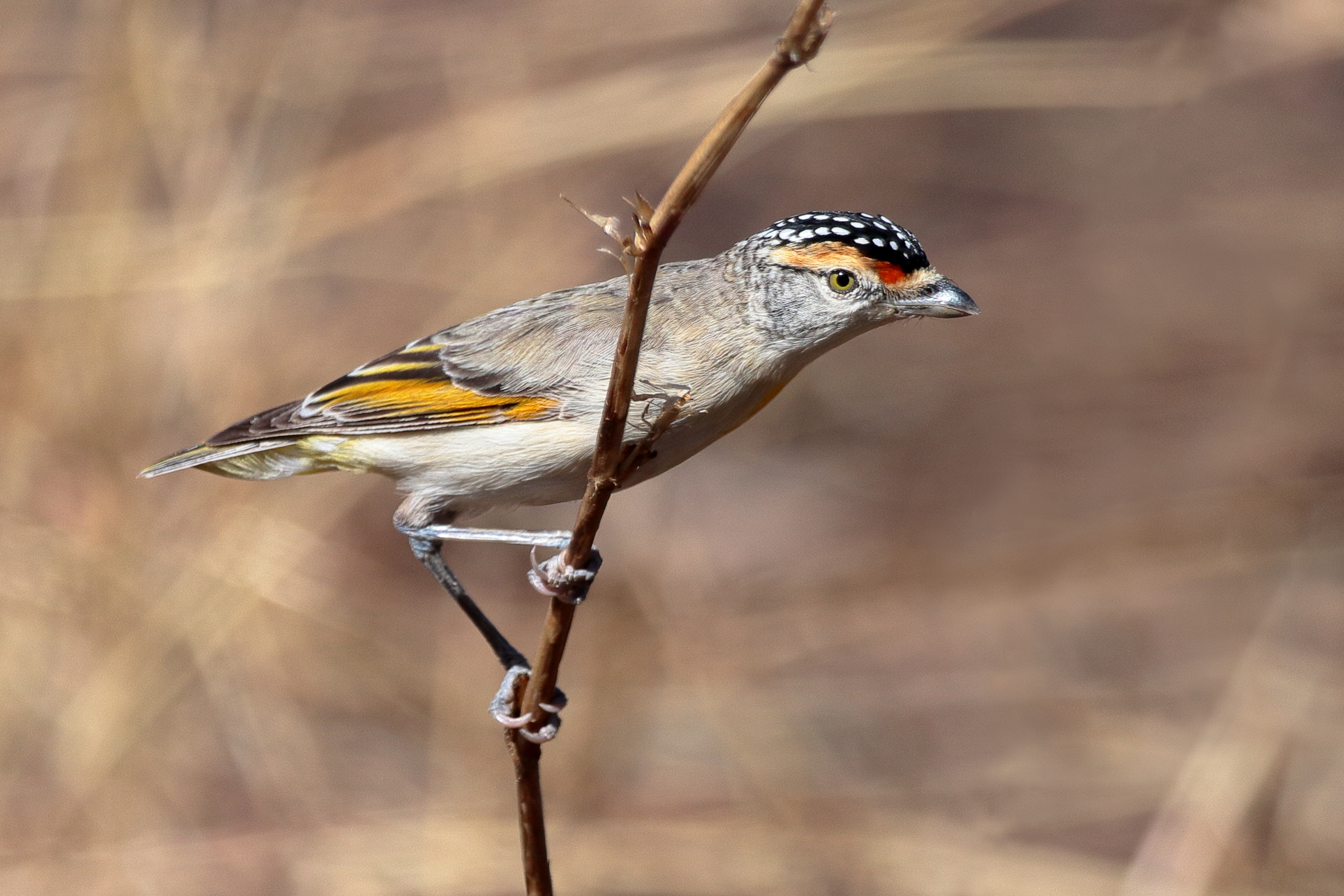

Conservation status
- Least Concern (IUCN 3.1)

Scientific classification
- Kingdom: Animalia
- Phylum: Chordata
- Class: Aves
- Order: Passeriformes
- Family: Pardalotidae
- Genus: Pardalotus
- Species: P. rubricatus

Binomial name
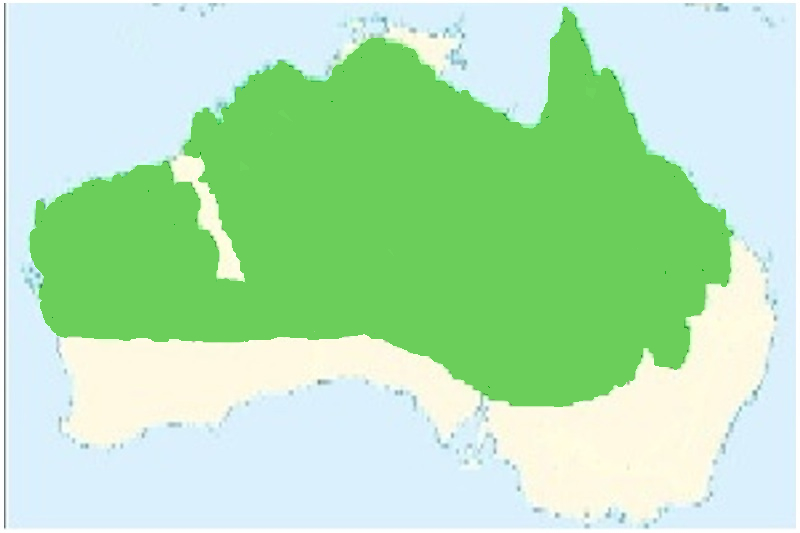
- Pardalotus rubricatus Gould, 1838 Red-browed pardalote (Pardalotus rubricatus) distribution map (green area) (BirdLife International 2014)

= Red-browed pardalote =

Species of bird

The red-browed pardalote (Pardalotus rubricatus) is a small brightly coloured insectivorous passerine, endemic to Australia (Schodde & Mason 1999). A gleaning specialist, they forage primarily in eucalypt trees (Woinarski 1984). The Latin word rubricatus means 'red-ochred' which is descriptive of their orange-red eyebrow (Higgins & Peter 2002). Other common names include red-browed diamondbird, bellbird, cape red-browed, pale red-browed, fawn-eyed, fawn-eyebrowed and pallid or red-lored pardalote (Higgins & Peter 2002).

== Taxonomy ==
Red-browed pardalotes belong to the order Passeriformes and family Pardalotidae of which four species are recognised: red-browed pardalote Pardalotus rubricatus, spotted pardalote Pardalotus punctatus, forty-spotted pardalote Pardalotus quadragintus and striated pardalote Pardalotus striatus. Historically, the family Pardalotidae included pardalotes and acanthizid warblers; Gerygones, scrubwrens and thornbills (Christidis & Boles 2008). However, recent phylogenetic and morphological studies (Driskell & Christidis 2004), (Schodde & Mason 1999) indicate that pardalotes are more closely related to honeyeaters than acanthizid warblers, which resulted in the separation of this group into two families, Pardalotidae and Acanthizidae (Christidis & Boles 2008). The pardalote, acanthizid warbler, honeyeater and bristlebird family, form a monophyletic group (Christidis & Boles 2008).

=== Subspecies ===
Matthews described the subspecies Pardalotus yorki in 1913 (Higgins & Peter 2002). Their range begins at the base of the Gulf of Carpentaria and extends north along the Cape York Peninsula in Far North Queensland (Schodde & Mason 1999). Differences in morphology and plumage distinguish this subspecies from the nominate race (Higgins & Peter 2002).

== Description ==
Adult red–browed pardalotes are a large pardalote with an average length of 105 mm and wingspan of 60–66 mm. Males weigh approximately 10.9g and females weigh 10.8 g. The average length of the male tarsus is 18.3 mm and female tarsus is 18.5 mm (Higgins & Peter 2002). The subspecies yorki are smaller in size, 100–120 mm long and weigh less at 9.3 g. The average length of the male tarsus is 17.4 mm and female tarsus is 17.3 mm (Higgins & Peter 2002), (Simpson, Day & Trusler 1999). Their wingspan is 58–62 mm in length (Schodde & Mason 1999).

The red–browed pardalote does not exhibit plumage that changes seasonally and is not sexually dichromatic (Higgins & Peter 2002). The nominate race rubricatus have a pale iris, a black crown with distinctive white spots and a yellow to buff supercilium. They have a red to orange-red brow and a yellow breast patch with yellow wing panels (Higgins & Peter 2002), (Simpson, Day & Trusler 1999). Juvenile birds are generally paler in comparison to adults (Simpson, Day & Trusler 1999). They have a darker iris that is olive to pale olive, a duller crown with less obvious patterning and a dull orange-yellow brow (Higgins & Peter 2002).

The sub-species yorki are generally more brightly coloured than the nominate race (Simpson, Day & Trusler 1999). They have an iris that is straw-brown or yellow, a black crown with fine spots; fine dark scalloping across their mantel and hind neck. They have a bright yellow breast patch, yellow rump and an orange wing panel (Higgins & Peter 2002), (Schodde & Mason 1999). Plumage of the juvenile yorki subspecies has not been described (Higgins & Peter 2002).

The call of the red-browed pardalote is a distinctive five or six note song, with the first note longer and lower pitched than the remaining notes which increase in pitch and speed (Higgins & Peter 2002), (Simpson, Day & Trusler 1999). Males call periodically between feeding to announce their territory from a sheltered perch within the trees canopy (Schodde & Tidemann 1986). It has been described as sounding similar to the call of a rosella species (Higgins & Peter 2002).

== Distribution and habitat ==
The red-browed pardalote is a widely distributed species ranging from north and central Australia, south and south central Western Australia, northeast South Australia ( Lake Eyre Basin) to south west New South Wales. They may also be found throughout the Great Sandy, Gibson and Great Victoria Desert (Higgins & Peter 2002). They live in a wide range of habitats including woodlands, shrublands, tropical, arid and semi-arid regions of Australia (Higgins & Peter 2002). Eucalypt woodlands, which border watercourses such as riparian river red gum, coolibah woodlands and tall eucalypt shrublands such as mallee, are the preferred habitats (Costello 1981), (Higgins & Peter 2002), (Hornsby 1996), (Pedler & Ragless 1978).

In the desert sand-ridge country of Western Australia, red-browed pardalotes forage in the upper story of bloodwoods and marble gums dispersed amongst sand dunes (Pianka & Pianka 1970). They have also been recorded in bloodwood-banksia, low–acacia and eucalypt–paperbark woodlands, mulga, acacia shrublands, spinifex plains and grasslands (Badman 1979), (Cody 1991), (Higgins & Peter 2002), (Rix 1970). Red-browed pardalotes may also inhabit sand dunes, rocky outcrops, valleys and floodplains (Higgins & Peter 2002).

== Behaviour ==
=== Foraging and diet ===
Red-browed pardalotes are sedentary (Blakers, Davies & Reilly 1985) and hold foraging territories throughout the year (Schodde & Tidemann 1986). They are usually seen singly, in pairs or small groups of up to five or six birds (Higgins & Peter 2002). They are arboreal and spend most of their time foraging in the foliage of eucalypt trees (Woinarski 1985). Their 'scoop-shaped' bill is used to glean insects and lerps (exudates of psyllids) from the leaf surface (Schodde & Mason 1999), (Woinarski 1984). Lerps are a major food source for pardalotes providing sugar and carbohydrates (Woinarski 1984). They also consume arthropods, beetles (Coleoptera species), gum leaf beetle (Paropsis species), flies, mosquitoes, flowerflies, leafhoppers, shield bugs, psyllids, bees, ants, wasps and vegetable matter (Barker & Vestjens 1990).

=== Breeding ===
The red-browed pardalote breeds between July and December and after rainfall in arid zones (Schodde & Tidemann 1986). Pairs are monogamous and maintain breeding territories (Higgins & Peter 2002), (Schodde & Tidemann 1986). Both the male and female excavate a tunnel 6–122 cm long and a nesting chamber 10–12.7 cm deep, 6.3–10 cm wide and 14.0 cm high. This can be found in a range of locations, including sandy banks, gullies, cuttings, sand dunes, sand cliffs or piles of sand and soil (Higgins & Peter 2002).

Red-browed pardalotes may also excavate the burrows of kangaroo rats (Potoroidae), hopping mice (Notomys) and bilbies (Macrotis lagotis) (Higgins & Peter 2002). They occasionally nest in tree hollows, spouts or hollow branches (Costello 1981), (Parsons 1921). A bird was once recorded nesting halfway down an iron pipe that was set upright in the ground (Campbell 1921).

Nests may be constructed of strips of bark, horsehair and are lined with fine grass or bark and shaped into a rounded cup within the excavated chamber (Campbell 1909), (Higgins & Peter 2002). A clutch of up to four white, oval, semi-glossy eggs measuring 19mm x 15 mm are laid (Beruldsen 1980). The incubation period is unknown, however both sexes incubate the eggs. Chicks are altricial and are fed by both adults (Higgins & Peter 2002).

== Conservation status ==
The International Union for Conservation of Nature (IUCN) has categorised the red-browed pardalote as a species of least concern. Although its population size has not been quantified, the species is common throughout its range, and its population is considered to be stable.
