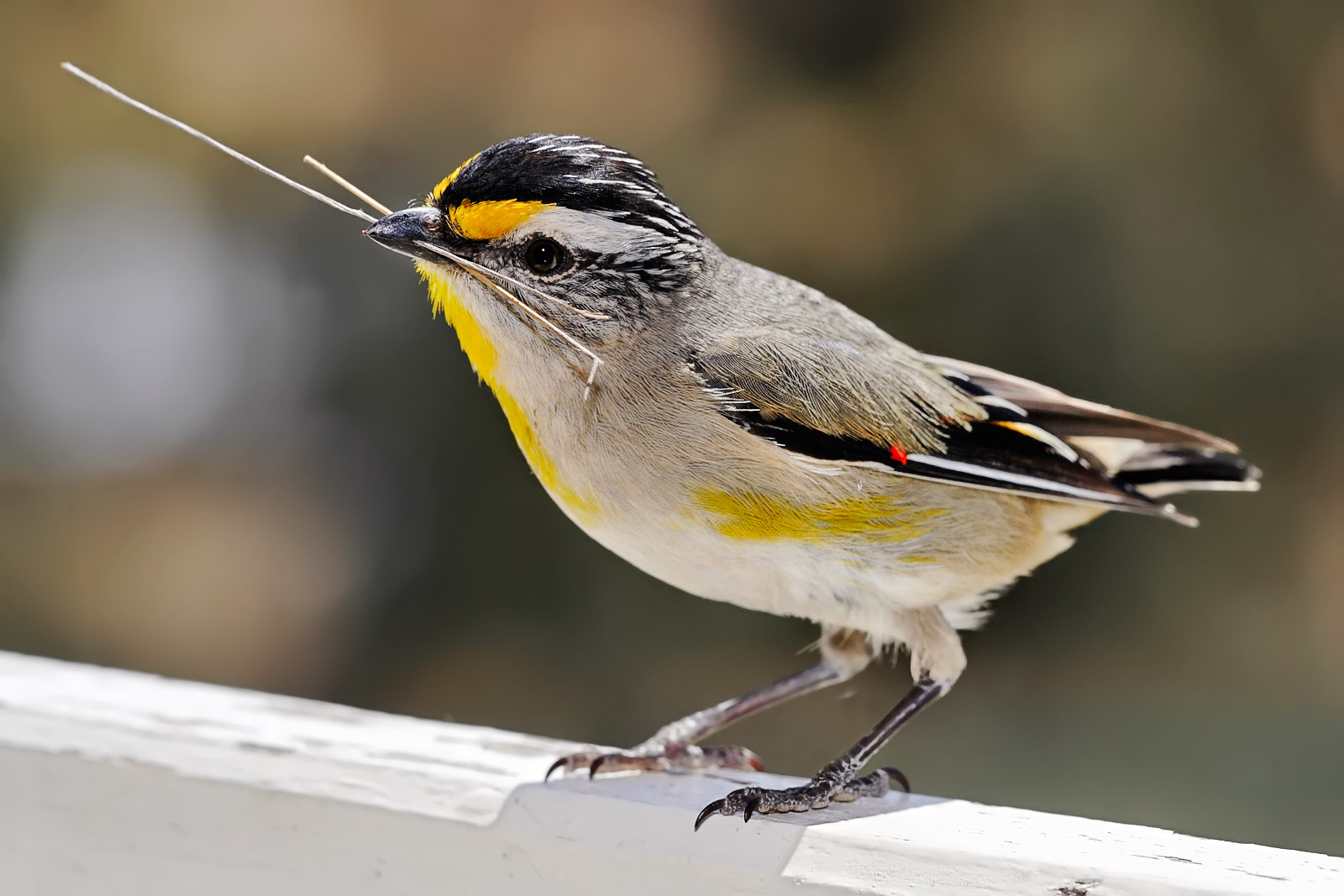
- Pardalotus striatus ornatus with nesting material

Scientific classification
- Kingdom: Animalia
- Phylum: Chordata
- Class: Aves
- Order: Passeriformes
- Superfamily: Meliphagoidea
- Family: Pardalotidae; Strickland, 1842
- Genus: Pardalotus; Vieillot, 1816

Type species
- Pipra punctata Shaw & Nodder, 1792

Species
- Pardalotus punctatus (Shaw, 1792); Pardalotus quadragintus Gould, 1838; Pardalotus rubricatus Gould, 1838; Pardalotus striatus (Gmelin, 1789)

Synonyms
- Pardalotes Lesson, 1828; Pardalotis Owen, 1853; Pardolotus Boie, 1826

= Pardalote =

Family of birds

Pardalotes or peep-wrens are a family, Pardalotidae, of very small, brightly coloured birds native to Australia, with short tails, strong legs, and stubby blunt beaks. This family is composed of four species in one genus, Pardalotus, and several subspecies. The name derives from a Greek word meaning "spotted". The family once contained several other species now split into the family Acanthizidae.

Pardalotes spend most of their time high in the outer foliage of trees, feeding on insects, spiders, and above all lerps (a type of sap-sucking insect). Their role in controlling lerp infestations in the eucalyptus forests of Australia may be significant. They generally live in pairs in small tunnels or in small family groups but sometimes come together into flocks after breeding.

Pardalotes are seasonal breeders in temperate areas of Australia but may breed year round in warmer areas. They are monogamous breeders, and both partners share nest construction, incubation and chick-rearing duties. All four species nest in deep horizontal tunnels drilled into banks of earth. Externally about the size of a mouse-hole, they can be very deep, at a metre or more. Some species also nest in tree hollows.

== Taxonomy and systematics ==
The genus Pardalotus was introduced in 1816 by the French ornithologist Louis Pierre Vieillot to accommodate a single species, the spotted pardalote, which is therefore considered as the type species. The genus name is from Ancient Greek pardalōtos meaning "spotted like a leopard". The family Pardalotidae (as a subfamily Pardalotinae) was introduced in 1842 by the English naturalist Hugh Strickland.

The pardalotes consist of several species contained in a single genus, Pardalotus, with the general consensus being to recognise four species. The placement of the genus has varied, being first placed with the mostly oriental flowerpeckers (Dicaeidae), as both groups are dumpy-looking birds with bright plumage. In addition both groups have a reduced tenth primary (one of the flight feathers). Genetic analysis has shown that the two groups are in fact not closely related, and that the pardalotes are instead more closely related to another Australian family, the Acanthizidae, which includes the scrubwrens, gerygones and thornbills. The two are sometimes merged into one family; when this is done the combined family is known as Pardalotidae, but the two groups have also been treated as two separate families.

Within the family two species, the forty-spotted pardalote and the red-browed pardalote, are fairly invariant species, but the remaining two species are highly variable. The striated pardalote contains six subspecies, which are sometimes elevated to four separate species. The spotted pardalote has three subspecies, one of which—the yellow-rumped pardalote—is sometimes treated as a separate species due to its distinctive plumage and call and lack of zone of hybridization in southwestern Australia. Within the family the relationships between the subspecies are unclear, although it is thought that the forty-spotted pardalote is closely related to the spotted pardalote.

Image	Scientific name	Common name	Subspecies	Distribution
	Pardalotus punctatus	Spotted pardalote	Yellow-rumped pardalote, Pardalotus punctatus xanthopyge; Pardalotus punctatus militaris	Australia
	Pardalotus quadragintus	Forty-spotted pardalote		Tasmania
	Pardalotus rubricatus	Red-browed pardalote		Australia
	Pardalotus striatus	Striated pardalote	Yellow-tipped pardalote, Pardalotus striatus striatus; Red-tipped pardalote, Pardalotus striatus ornatus; Black-headed pardalote, Pardalotus striatus melanocephalus, Pardalotus striatus uropygialis and Pardalotus striatus melvillensis	Australia

== Description ==
The pardalotes are small, compact birds that range in size from 8.5–12 cm (3.3–4.7 in) in length. The spotted and striated pardalotes conform to Bergmann's rule and are larger in the south than they are in the north. The males and females are the same size as each other, but there are some differences in the plumage of some species. They have short, square-tipped tails and relatively short rounded wings (which are longer in the more dispersive species). The bill is short, deep and robust, but lacks the rictal bristles that surround the bills of many other insectivorous birds.

== Distribution and habitat ==
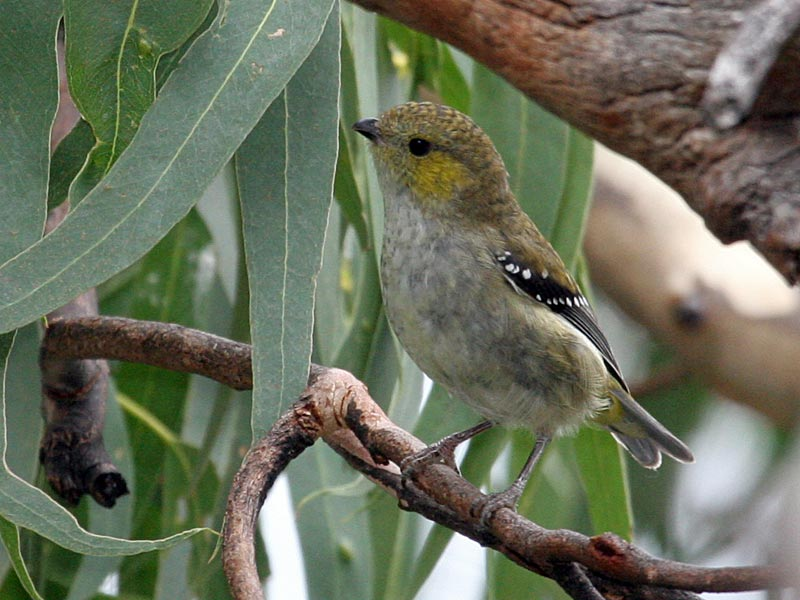
The forty-spotted pardalote is endemic to Tasmania

The pardalotes are endemic to Australia. The forty-spotted has the most restricted distribution of the four species, being endemic to Tasmania; in contrast the most widespread species, the striated pardalote, is found throughout Australia, only absent from some of the driest areas of the inland central and western deserts. The red-browed pardalote is widespread in the north and west of Australia, whereas the spotted pardalote is found closer to the coast in southern and eastern Australia.

The family are eucalyptus forest specialists. While they may occur in forests and woodlands dominated by other tree types, these are marginal habitats for the family and are seldom used. Pardalotes occupy a wide range of eucalypt habitats, from tall forests with a canopy over 30 metres (100 ft) high to low mallee woodlands with a canopy of just 3 metres (10 ft).

== Behaviour and ecology ==
Pardalotes are almost exclusively insectivores. They will occasionally consume some plant materials including seeds, and there has been an observation of one striated pardalote beating and then eating a lizard. They feed singly or in pairs during the breeding season, but have been recorded as joining mixed-species feeding flocks in the winter months. The majority of foraging occurs on Eucalyptus, with other trees being used much less frequently; among the eucalyptus, trees from the subgenus Symphyomyrtus are preferred. Pardalotes forage by gleaning insects from the foliage, as opposed to catching insects while flying. Pardalotes may consume a number of different types of insects, but lerps – a honeydew casing exuded by insects of the family Psyllidae – form the major component of their diet and the one to which they are most adapted. These lerps are also highly sought after by the larger honeyeaters, which aggressively defend the resource. A study of pardalotes in Australia estimated that 5% of a pardalote's day is spent evading honeyeater attacks.

== Movements ==
Patterns of dispersal include regular winter movements northwards and to lower altitudes. Striated Pardalotes migrate from Tasmania across Bass Strait to winter on the Australian mainland. Spotted and Striated Pardalotes move from higher altitude forests to lower rainfall inland plains in SE Australia. Spotted and Striated Pardalotes also move intermittently following increases in psyllids food sources. Some Pardalote populations are sedentary. Forty-spotted Pardalotes are probably sedentary with local seasonal movements restricted to eastern Tasmania and its adjacent islands. Movements of Red-browed Pardalotes are unknown.

== Status and conservation threats ==
The Striated, Spotted and Red-browed Pardalotes are widespread and common but their populations are decreasing due to habitat loss. Land clearing and commercial forestry in native eucalypt forests results in the loss of foraging habitat, nesting hollows and forest linkages essential for dispersal. The Forty-spotted Pardalote is listed as Endangered by the IUCN and under Australian legislation. The distribution of the Forty-spotted Pardalote is restricted to a narrow habitat range and the population is small and fragmented. Threats include habitat loss, competition with colonial honeyeaters, especially the Noisy Miner, and parasitism. The Tasmanian ectoparasite, Passeromyia longicornis demonstrates a higher parasite load and virulence with high nestling mortality in Forty-spotted Pardalote nests compared to Striated Pardalotes. Over the 2-year study by Edworthy et al., Forty-spotted Pardalotes fledged fewer nestlings (18%) than sympatric Striated Pardalotes (26%). Climate change effects are uncertain but anticipated. Reductions in the distribution of the Striated Pardalote in the Western Australian wheatbelt are predicted due to climate change.
