= Elizabeth Nodder =

Publisher and artist

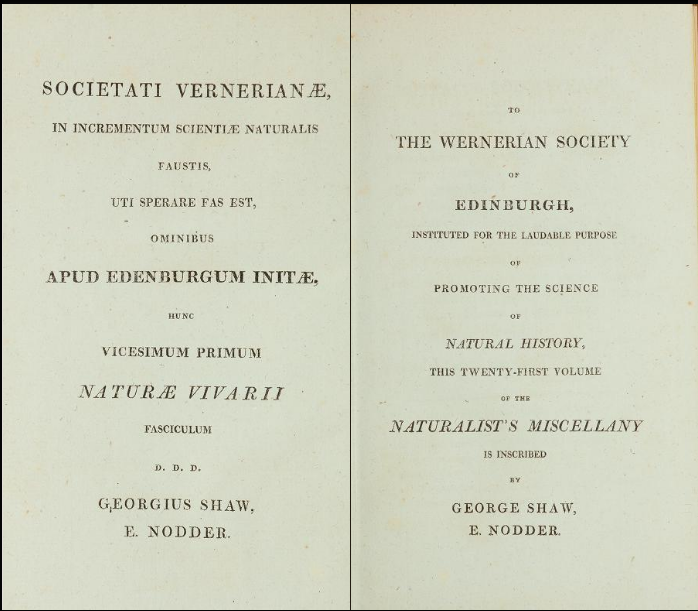
Naturalist's miscellany by George Shaw, E. Nodder

Elizabeth Nodder was a 19th-century publisher of the illustrated The Naturalist's Miscellany. She is listed in the database of scientific illustrators as an artist. She and her husband, Frederick Polydore Nodder collaborated in the publishing of this work, until his death circa 1800, when she continued to publish further volumes in the series, with Richard Polydore Nodder (their son) as illustrator.

George Kearsley Shaw, the naturalist, authored the texts of the miscellany from 1798 to 1813. The title pages of Volumes 1-12 give George Shaw and F.P. Nodder as authors. In vol 13 E.R. Nodder is listed after George Shaw. In vol 14, George Shaw is followed by E. & R. Nodder, while in the remaining volumes (15-24) (vols 13, 14) E. Nodder is listed together with George Shaw (vols 15–24). The Biodiversity heritage library lists her as publisher in their metadata, and this is the view of Dickinson, and is borne out be the evidence of the plates.

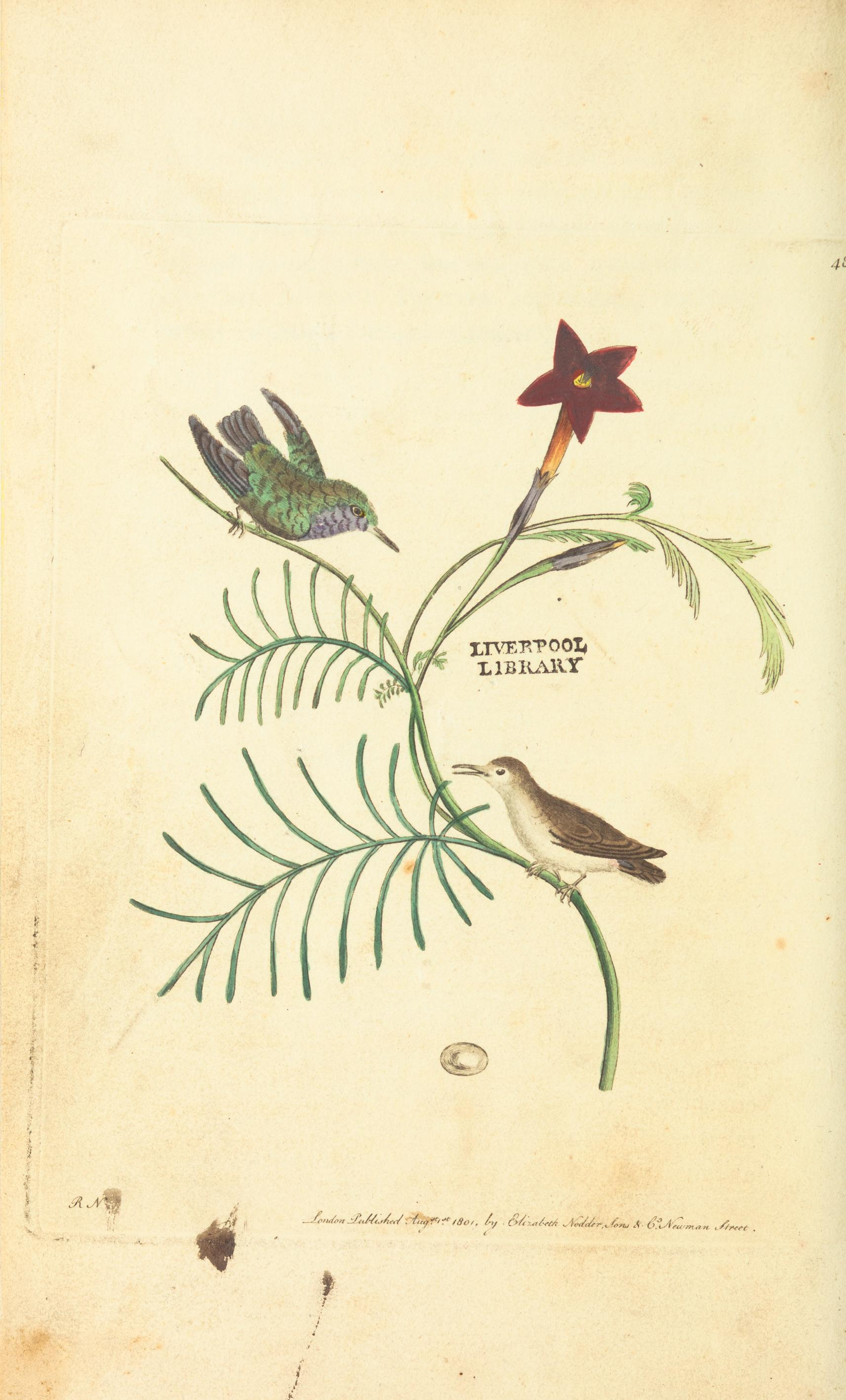
Trochilus minimus, August 1, 1801, Published by Elizabeth Nodder, Sons & Co.

Her contribution to George Shaw and Frederick Nodder Vivarium naturae or The Naturalist's Miscellany, in addition to publication after her husband's death, was proposed by evidence of signatures on the wrappers of some volumes. A revision of her attribution to any artwork found little evidence to support the theory, and no signatures at the printing plates, and any involvement in preparation of the illustrations remains uncertain.

== Gallery ==
Frederick Polydore Nodder illustrations from the naturalist's miscellany:

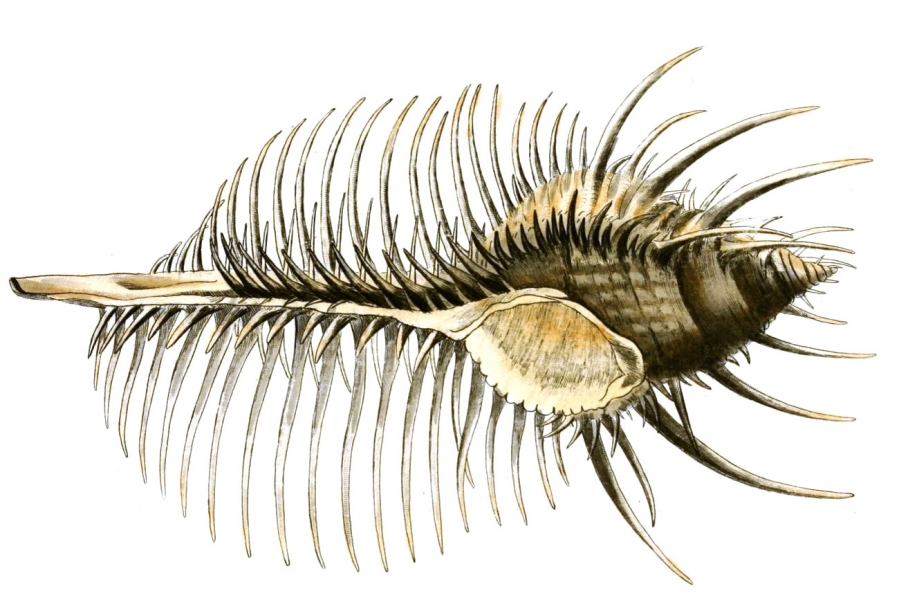

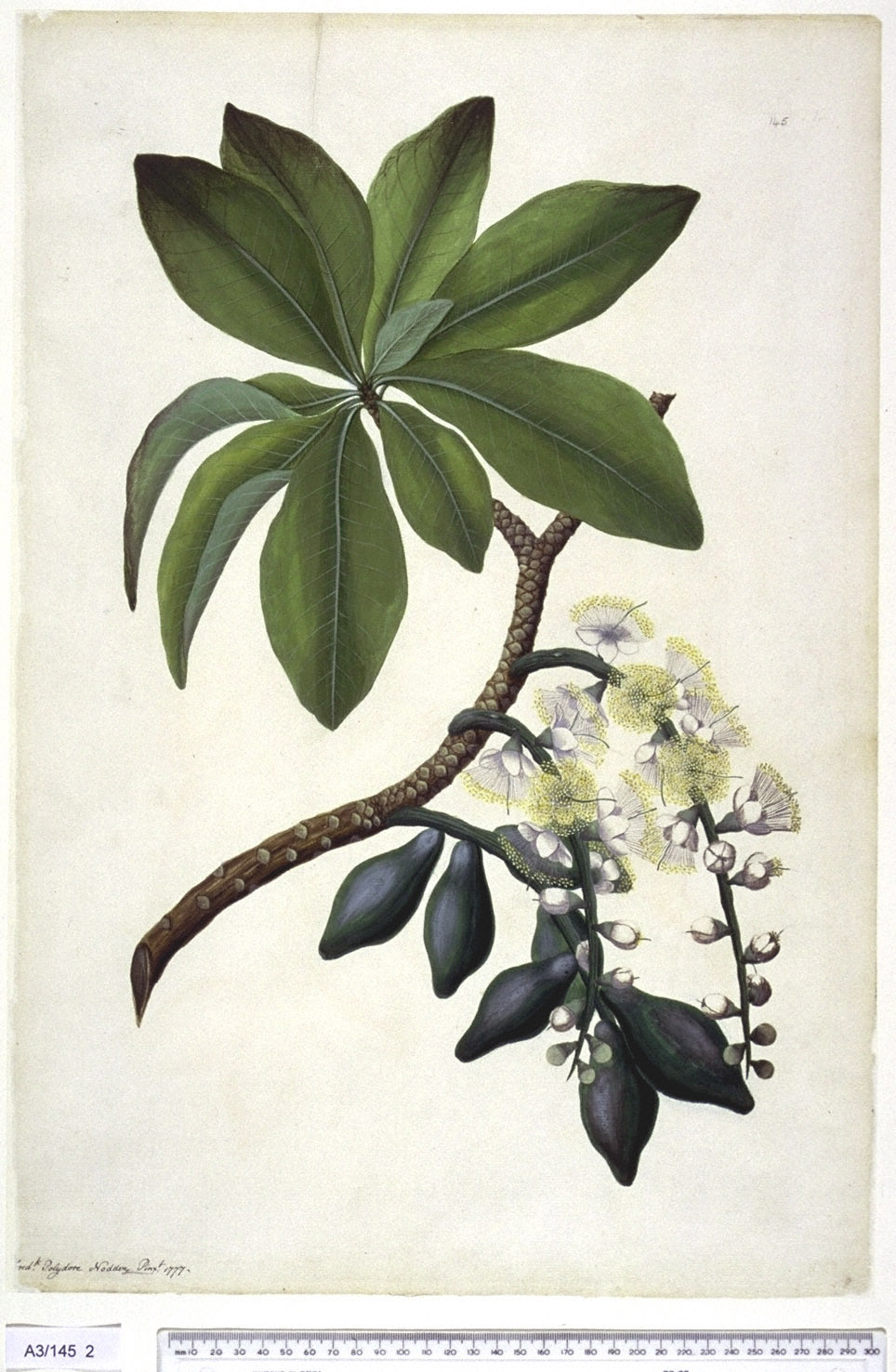

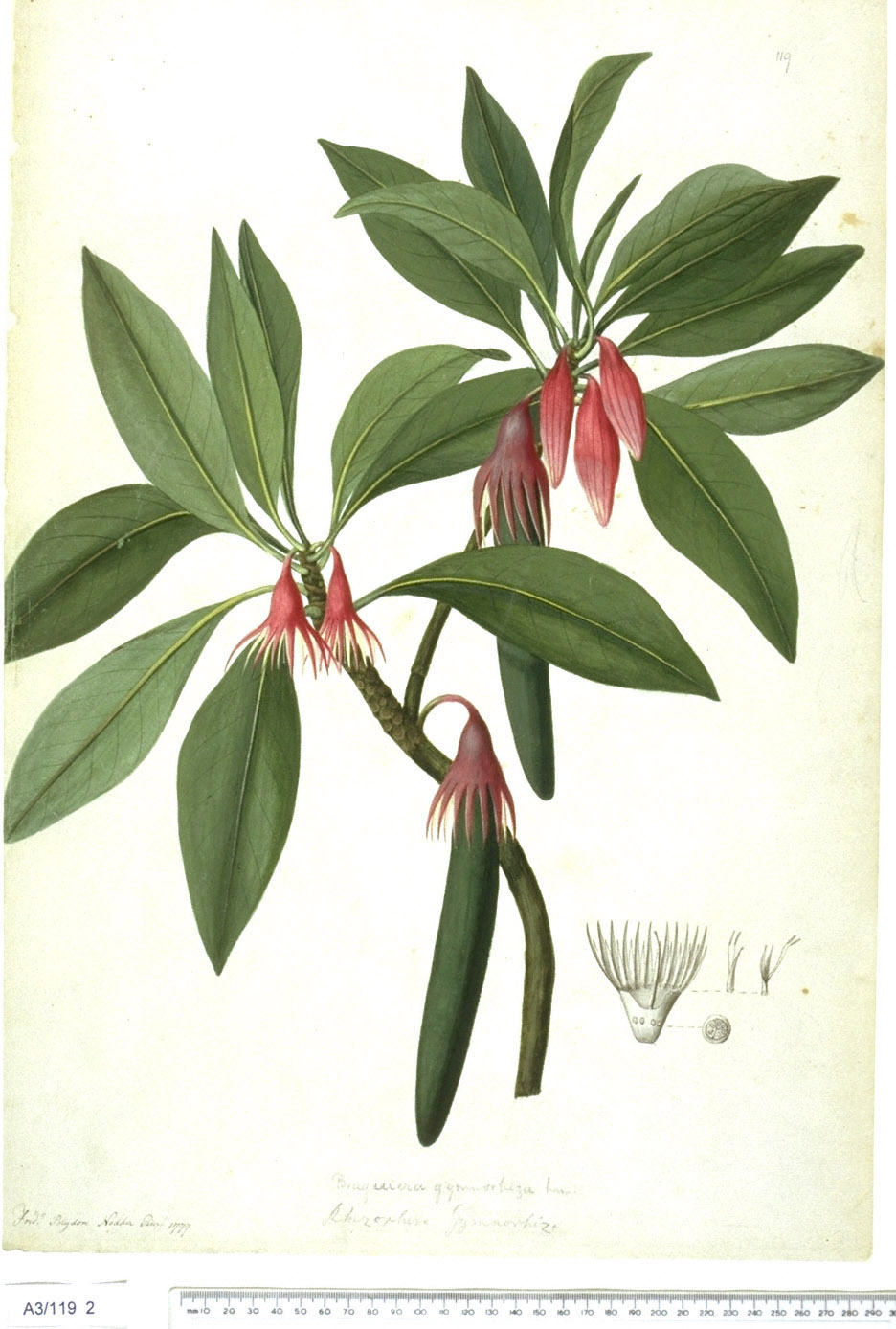

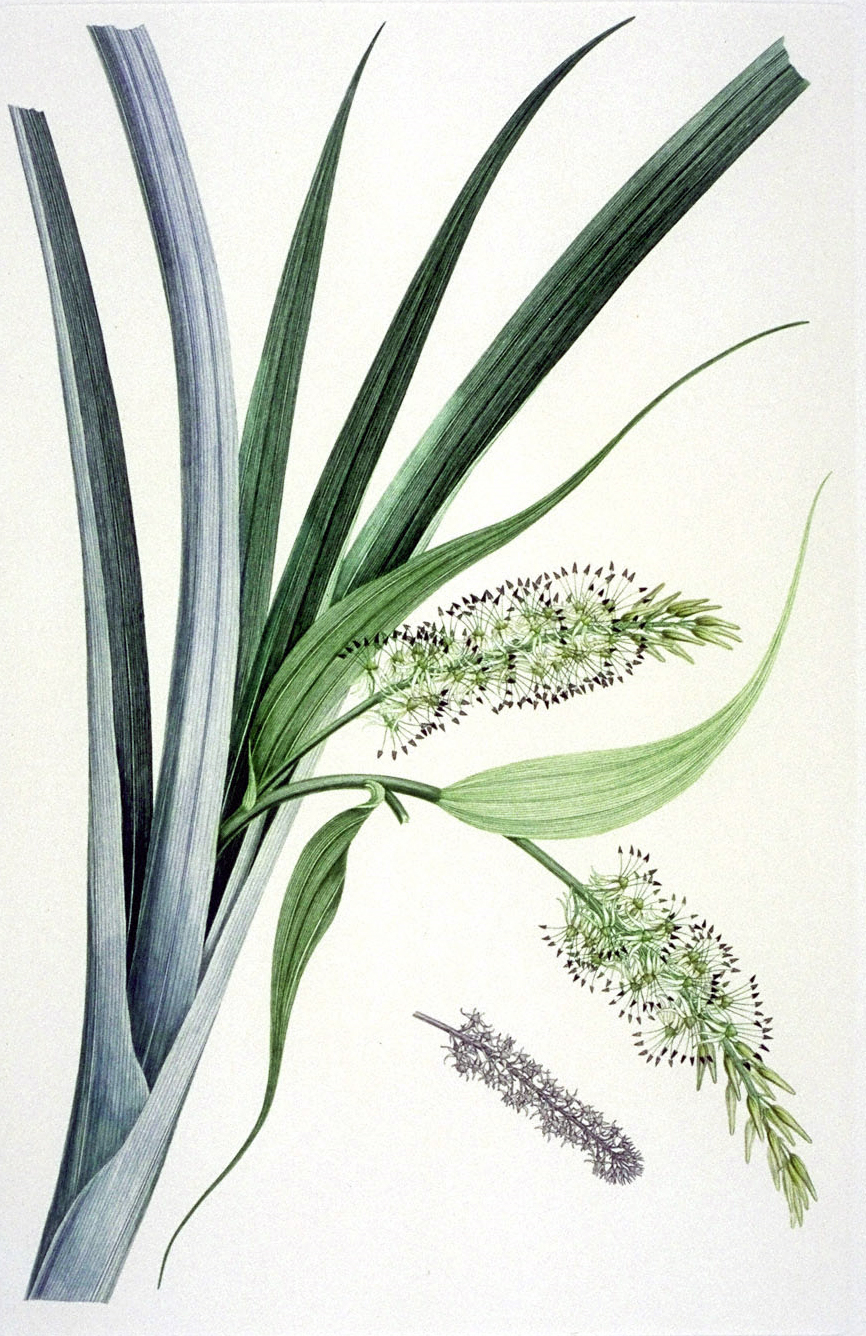

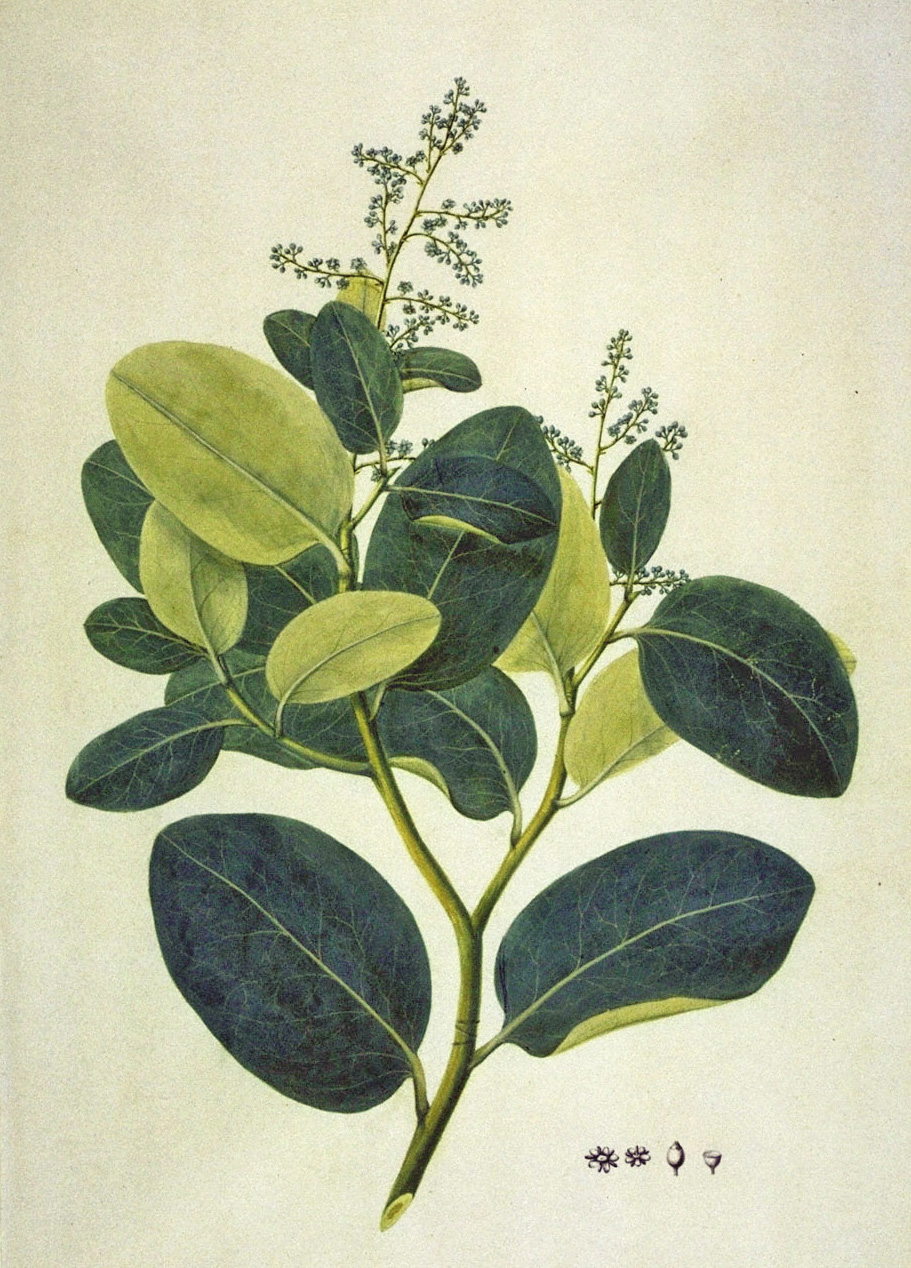
