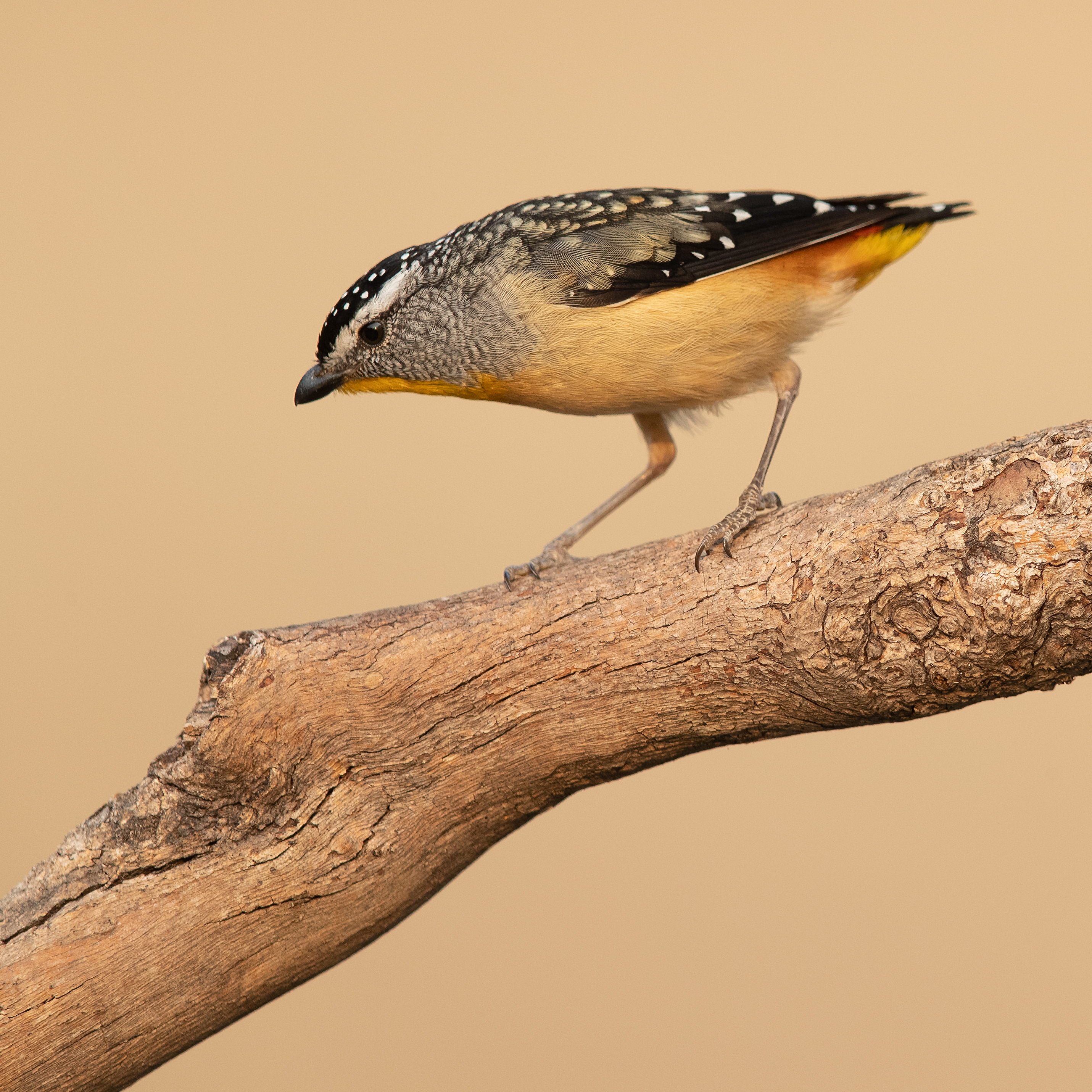
- Male, New South Wales
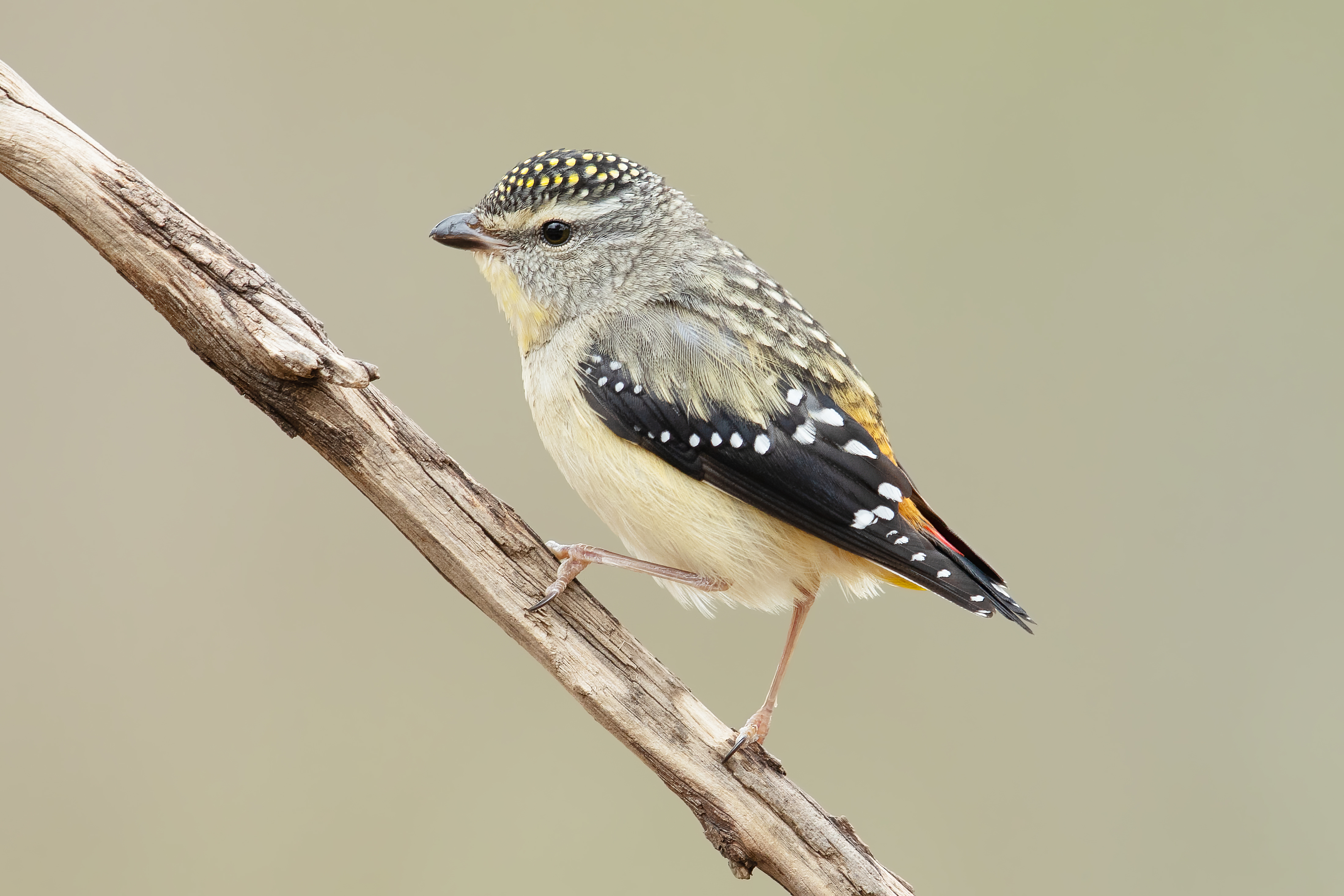
- Female, New South Wales

Conservation status
- Least Concern (IUCN 3.1)

Scientific classification
- Kingdom: Animalia
- Phylum: Chordata
- Class: Aves
- Order: Passeriformes
- Family: Pardalotidae
- Genus: Pardalotus
- Species: P. punctatus

Binomial name
- Pardalotus punctatus (Shaw, 1792)
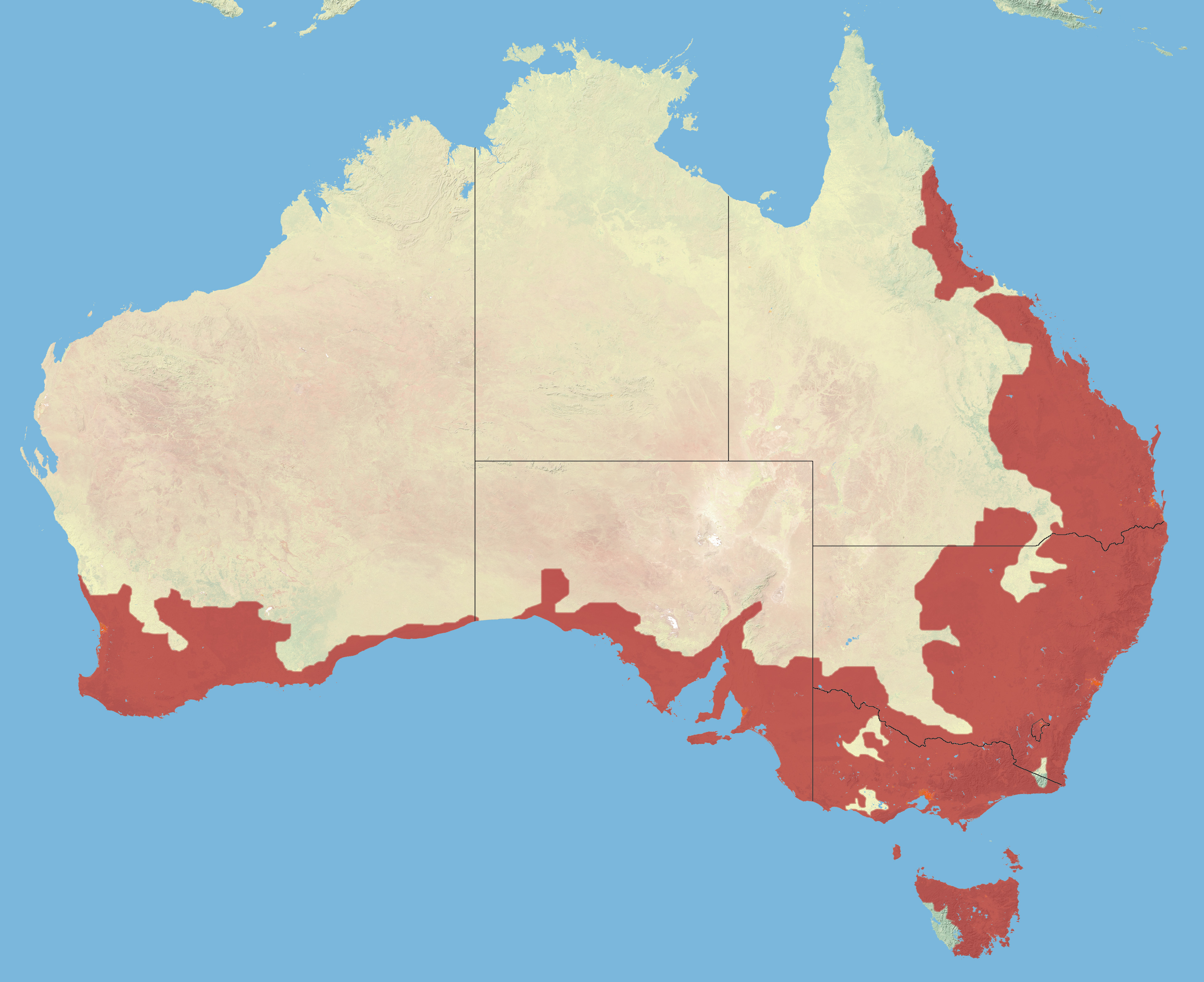
- Approximate distribution

= Spotted pardalote =

Species of bird

The spotted pardalote (Pardalotus punctatus) is a small passerine bird native to eastern and southern Australia, at elevations of up to 2,000 metres (6,600 ft). It is part of the pardalote family, Pardalotidae. One of the smallest of all Australian birds at 8 to 10 centimetres (3.1 to 3.9 in) in length, and one of the most colourful; it is sometimes known as the diamondbird. Although moderately common in all of the reasonably fertile parts of Australia (the east coast, the south-east, and the south-west corner) it is seldom seen closely enough to enable identification.

Three subspecies are recognised. The wet tropics spotted pardalote (subspecies militaris) is found in northeastern Queensland, while the distinctive subspecies, the yellow-rumped pardalote (subspecies xanthopyge), is mostly found in drier inland regions of southern Australia, particularly in semi-arid Mallee woodlands. Also occasionally found nesting in burrows in semi-rainforest areas inland from the coast in Mid North Coast NSW.

== Taxonomy ==
The spotted pardalote was described by English naturalist George Shaw and drawn by Frederick Polydore Nodder in the 1792 work The Naturalist's Miscellany: Or, Coloured Figures Of Natural Objects; Drawn and Described Immediately From Nature. Calling it Pipra punctata, or speckled manakin, Shaw conceded that nothing had been reported of its habits in New Holland (Australia). Early settlers of New South Wales knew it as the Diamond Bird, on account of the spots on its plumage, and John Gould called it the spotted diamond-bird. Other early names include diamond sparrow, bank diamond and diamond dyke, the last two relating to its nest burrows in riverbanks. Indigenous people from lowlands and Perth districts of southern Western Australia knew it as widopwidop and bilyabit, though the terms were also used for the striated pardalote. Headache bird is a colloquial name given it because of the repetitive "sleep-may-be" call uttered in the breeding season.

The species was placed in the new genus Pardalotus by Louis Pierre Vieillot in 1816, who also coined the word "pardalote". Within the genus, its closest relative is the forty-spotted pardalote (Pardalotus quadragintus) based on size and plumage similarities.

Three subspecies are recognised. The nominate subspecies (P. punctatus punctatus) is found from southeastern Queensland through eastern New South Wales, eastern and southern Victoria and into southeastern South Australia, as well as southwestern Western Australia. It is also found across eastern and northwestern Tasmania.

The yellow-rumped pardalote (P. punctatus xanthopyge) was considered for many years to be a separate species native to dryer inland southern Australia. It was described in 1867 amid some controversy. Amateur ornithologist Edward Pierson Ramsay, then 24 years old, recorded that a specimen at the Australian Museum that had been collected by John Leadbeater near the Murray River differed in its plumage from the typical spotted pardalote. The director of the museum, Gerard Krefft, lent the specimen to Ramsay to describe, which he did as Pardalotus chrysoprymnus in a manuscript on 10 December 1866. Krefft advised him that Leadbeater was pushing for the species to be named after him, hence the paper was read but not published in London at a meeting of the Zoological Society of London on 28 February 1867. Meanwhile, Professor Frederick McCoy of the National Museum of Natural History and Geology in Melbourne also published a description of the species from a specimen collected near Swan Hill, in The Australasian newspaper on 29 December 1866, which was formally described on 1 March 1867. McCoy named it Pardalotus xanthopygus, or yellow-backed diamondbird. Ramsay suspected that discussion of his description prompted McCoy to publish his own description; however, McCoy countered that they had been aware it was a separate species for some time. In any case, McCoy's description stood and Ramsay's was consigned to synonymy.

In a 1983 paper, Lester Short and colleagues noted the similarity of plumage and calls between the two taxa and occurrence of hybrid specimens from Victoria where the two forms overlapped. John Woinarski found that around Bendigo (where both taxa occur), more pairs appeared to contain members of both forms than not. Western Australian ornithologist Julian Ford felt evidence of hybridization in Western Australia was lacking and also wondered whether land clearing and habitat alteration had promoted hybridization in southeastern Australia. In their 1999 Directory of Australian Birds, Richard Schodde and Ian Mason relegated the yellow-rumped pardalote to subspecies status on account of the intermediate characteristics of subspecies militaris and the widespread hybridization in southeastern Australia. They felt Ford's evidence for lack of interbreeding in Western and South Australia was not strong, but conceded fieldwork in Western Australia was needed.

The Wet Tropics spotted pardalote (Pardalotus punctatus militaris) is found in coastal central-northern Queensland. It has features in common with both other subspecies.

== Description ==
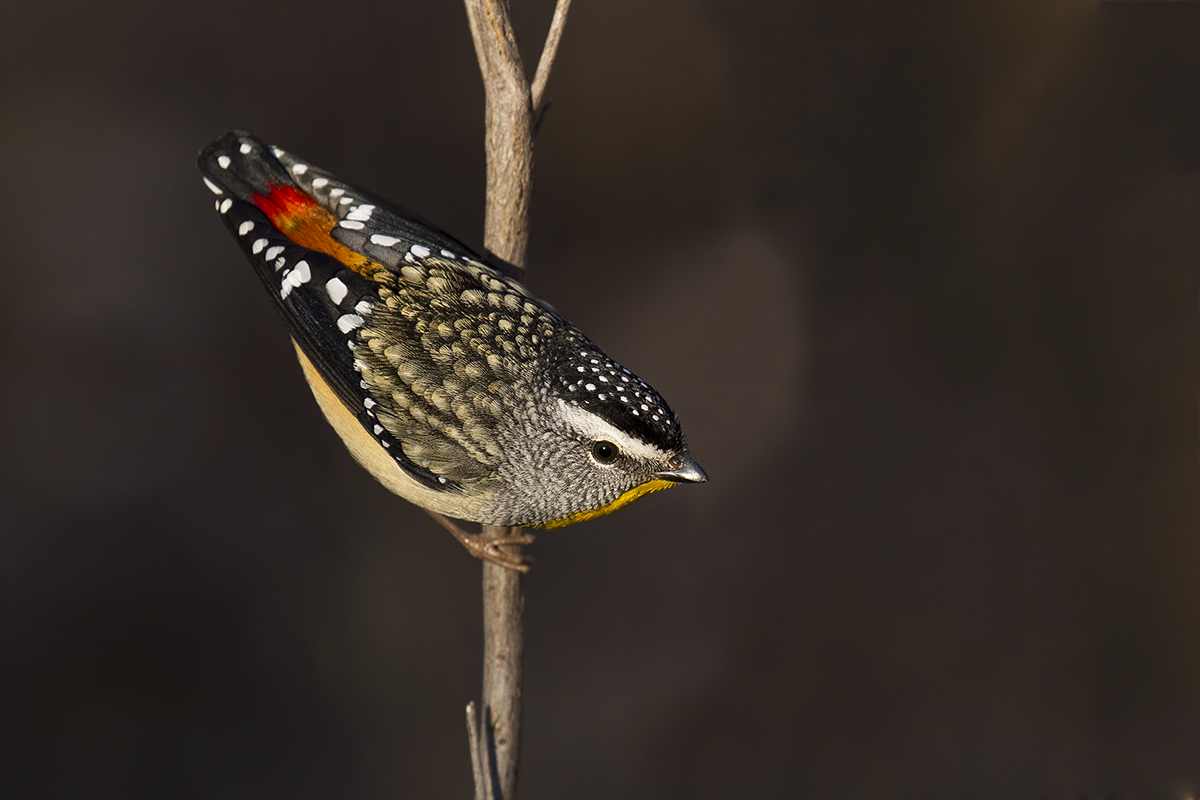
The reddish rump of the nominate subspecies is clearly visible (Strangways, Victoria).

Weighing around 6 grams (0.21 oz), the spotted pardalote is 8 to 10 cm (3.1 to 3.9 in) long. The adult male of the nominate subspecies has grey-brown upperparts with numerous paler buff spots, a black crown, wings and tail all with white spots, white eyebrows and reddish rump. The underparts are pale-buff-cinnamon, darkening to a more ochre at the breast, with a demarcated yellow throat and vent. The female is duller overall. The yellow-rumped subspecies is larger overall with a relatively smaller bill. The adult male has finer, white spots on its back, a bright yellow rump, and a cream breast. The adult female has finer spots than the adult female of the nominate subspecies. The Wet Tropics subspecies is smaller with a relatively larger bill. The adult male has a reddish rump and pale- to cinnamon-buff underparts.

== Distribution and habitat ==
George Caley reported that it was not common around Sydney even in early settlement days. Spotted pardalote numbers appear to be declining, especially in urban areas, but the species is not considered endangered at this time.

== Nesting ==
Spotted pardalotes breed between August or September to December or January—generally earlier in the year in northern parts of their range and later in southern areas. The nest is an underground horizontal oval chamber lined with shredded bark, linked by a tunnel 0.5 to 1.5 metres (1 ft 8 in to 4 ft 11 in) long to a hole in the side of a riverbank or slope in a shaded location. The chamber is generally higher than the entrance tunnel, presumably to avoid flooding. Birds have used carpet rolls and garage roll-a-doors to nest in on occasion. Pairs breed once a year, producing a clutch of 3 to 4 round shiny white eggs 16 mm (0.63 in) long by 13 mm (0.51 in) wide. The eggs are incubated for 19 days until they hatch, with nestlings spending another 21 days in the nest.

Pairs make soft, whistling wheet-wheet calls to one another throughout the day, which carry for quite a distance. One of the difficulties in locating a pardalote is that the contact call is in fact two calls: an initial call and an almost instant response, and thus can come from two different directions.

== Gallery ==
Samsonvale, Queensland, Australia

Singing male (Armstrong Creek, Queensland, Australia)

Male and female burrowing
(Thirlmere NSW, Australia)

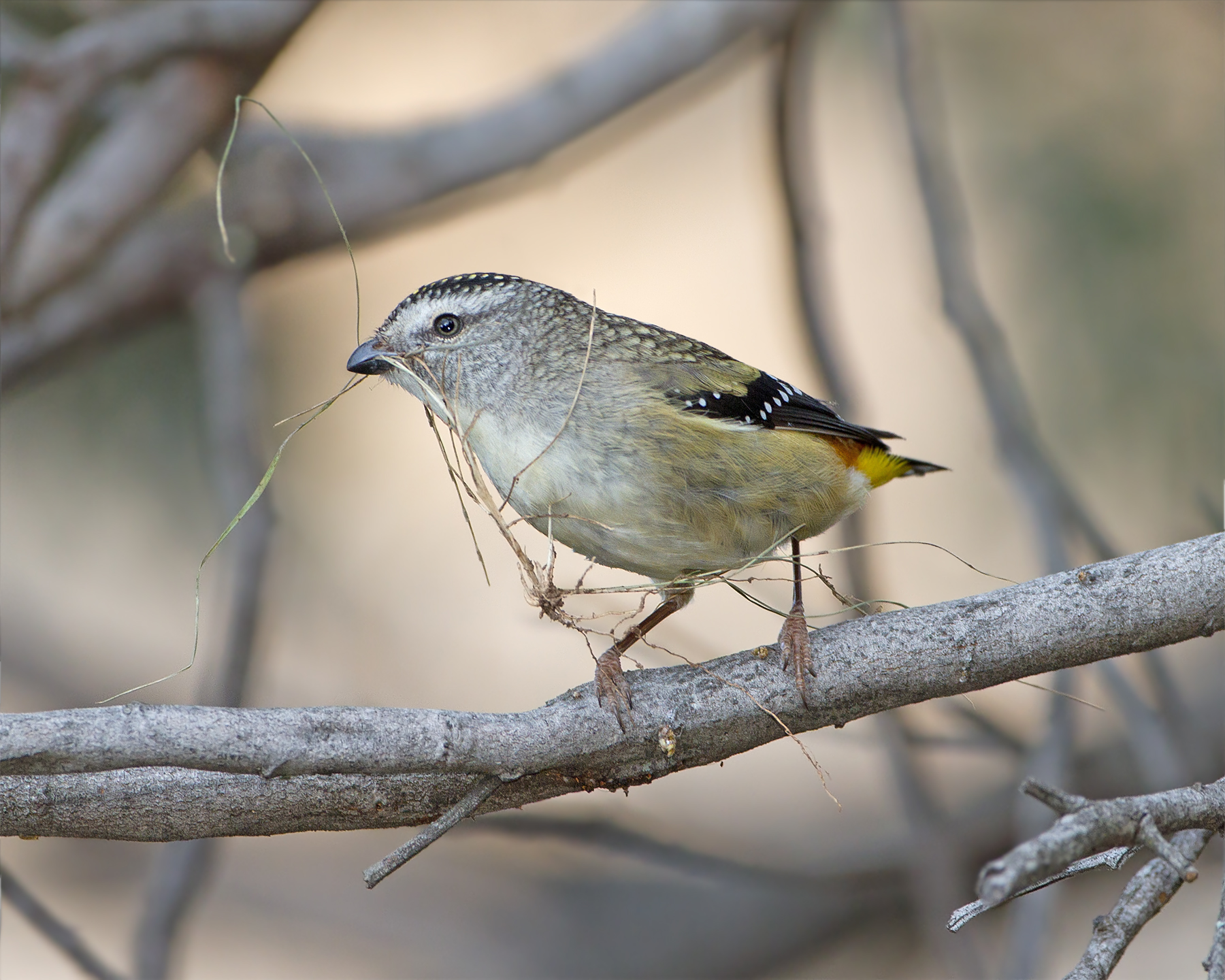
Female with nesting material
(Risdon Brook, Tasmania, Australia)
