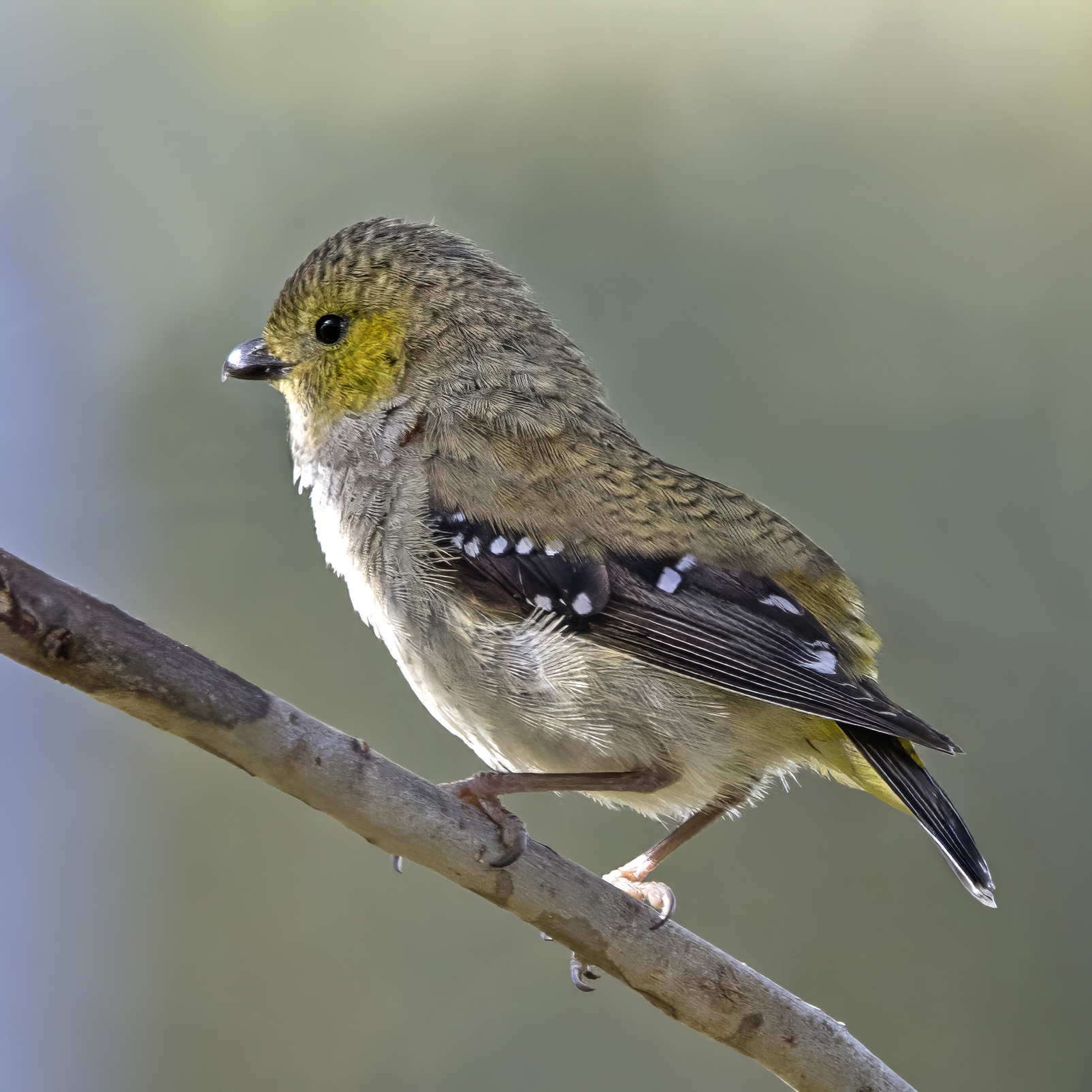
- South Bruny, Tasmania

Conservation status
- Endangered (IUCN 3.1)

Scientific classification
- Kingdom: Animalia
- Phylum: Chordata
- Class: Aves
- Order: Passeriformes
- Family: Pardalotidae
- Genus: Pardalotus
- Species: P. quadragintus

Binomial name
- Pardalotus quadragintus Gould, 1838
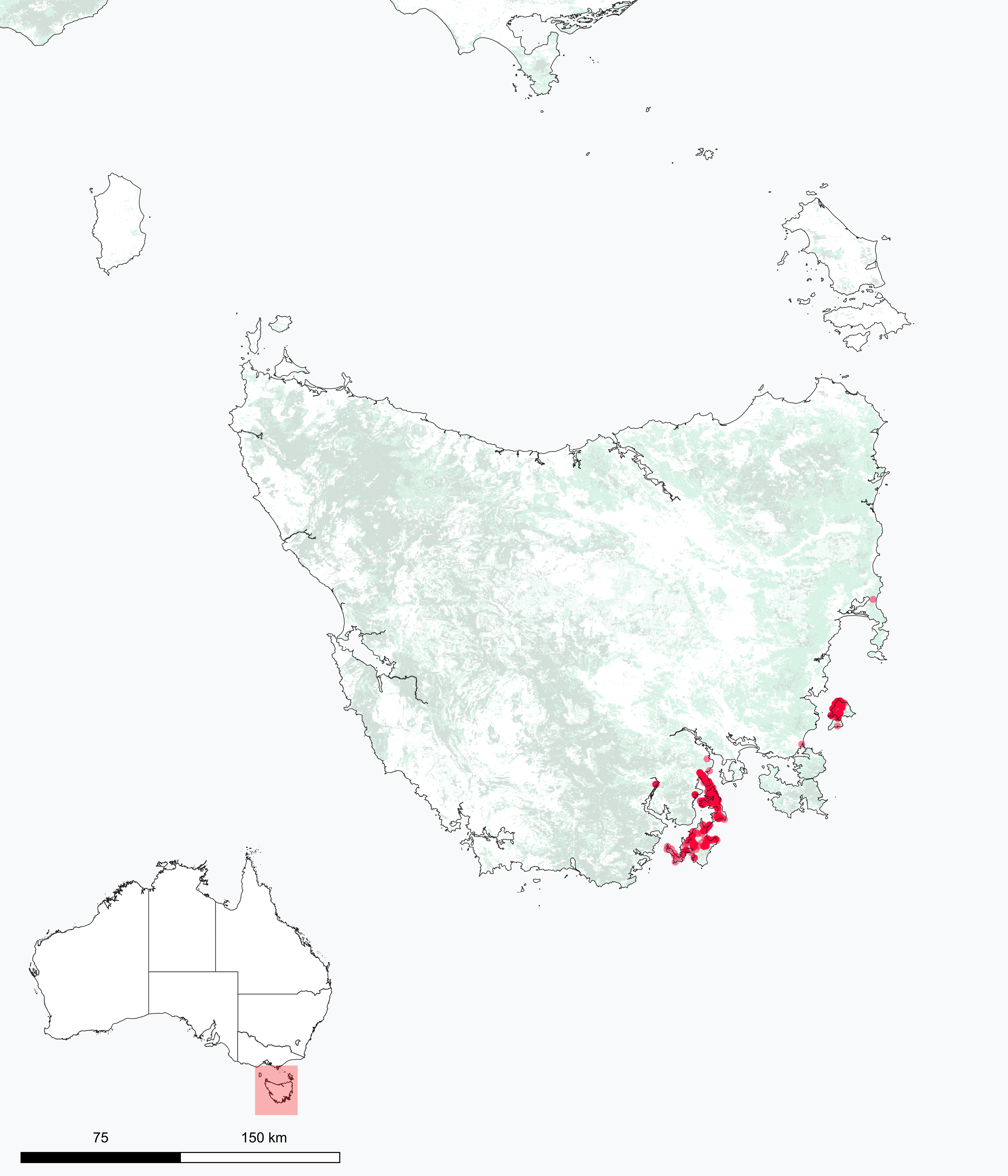

= Forty-spotted pardalote =

Species of bird

The forty-spotted pardalote (Pardalotus quadragintus) is one of Australia's rarest birds and by far the rarest pardalote, being confined to a few colonies in the south-east corner of Tasmania, mainly on Maria Island and Bruny Island.

== Description ==
A small, energetic passerine about 9 to 10 cm (3.5 to 4 in) long, the forty-spot is similar to the much commoner spotted pardalote (Pardalotus punctatus), but has a dull greenish-brown back and head, compared to the more colourful plumage of the latter, with which it shares its range, and there is no brow line. The rump is olive, the under-tail dull yellow. The chest is white with light yellow tints. The wings are black with white tips, appearing as many (closer to 60 than 40) discrete dots when the wings are folded. There is no seasonal variation in plumage; juveniles are slightly less colourful than the adults.

== Distribution and habitat ==
The forty-spotted pardalote is as of September 2021 found reliably only in a few isolated colonies on south-eastern Tasmania, most notably on Maria Island and Bruny Island. These two islands contain 99% of the species' population; there are a few colonies scattered across mainland Tasmania, and there may be a few left on Flinders Island. In 2009 there were 450 individuals on Bruny Island and 974 on Maria Island. A 2009 survey counted 1,486 birds at 54 of the 102 colonies surveyed; this compares with 3,840 individuals counted in 121 colonies in 1991 to 1997 – a loss of 47% of colonies.

The birds are found almost exclusively in dry eucalypt forests with high concentration of the Eucalyptus viminalis (white gum), where it forages almost exclusively. This species provides around 80% of the nestlings' diet.

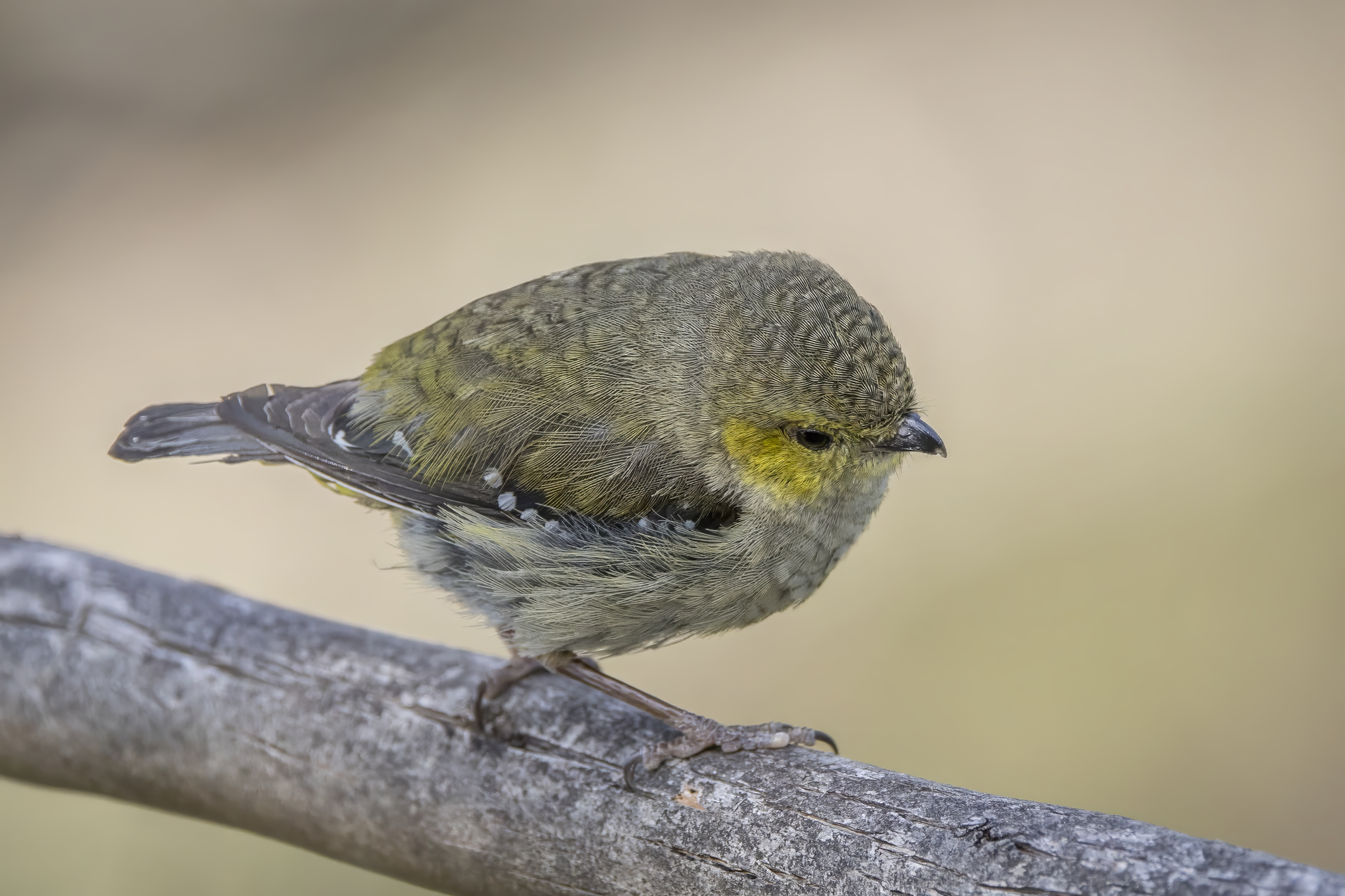

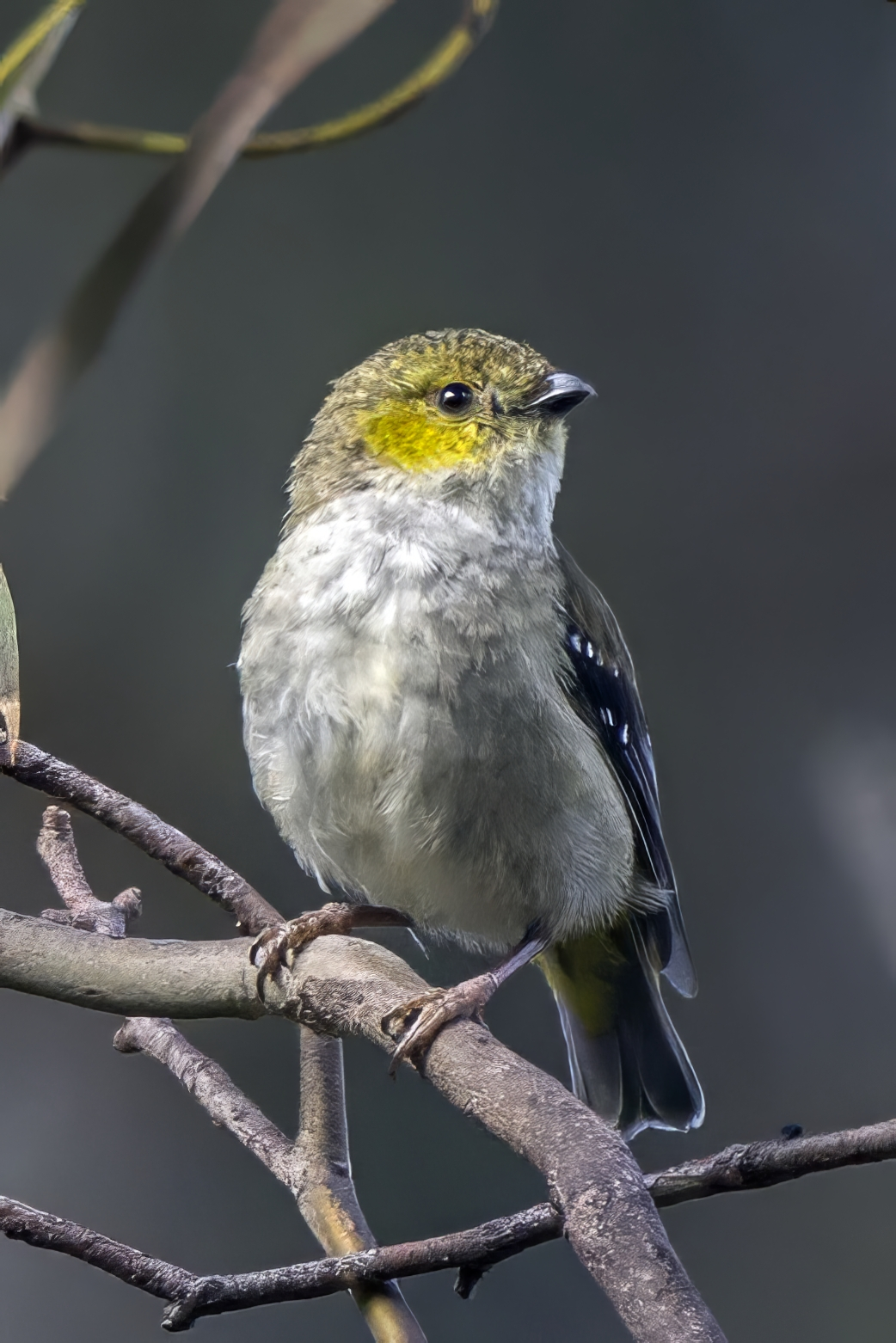

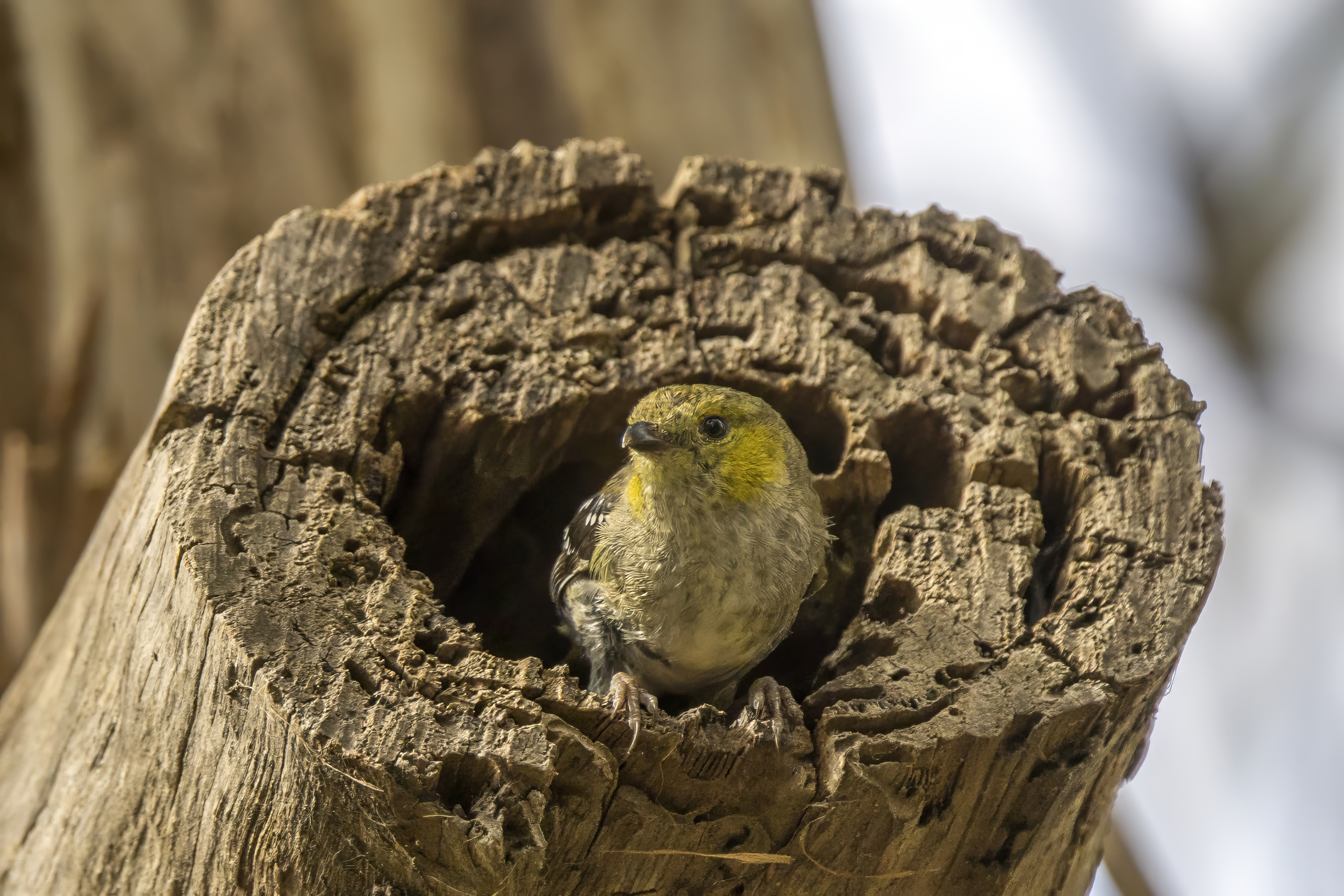
at a man-made nest

== Conservation ==
In the 17 years prior to 2010/2011, there had been a decrease of up to 60% in overall population. It is listed by the IUCN as endangered, because of its very small range, its highly fragmented distribution and its very small breeding area.

Threats include land clearing for sheep farming, low rainfall linked to climate change; bushfires; competitors such as noisy miners and striated pardalotes; predators such as the (introduced) laughing kookaburras; and the native parasitic fly Passeromyia longicornis.

== Behaviour ==
Forty-spots form pairs and are territorial during the breeding season, but may form small flocks during the winter. They are insect hunters and forage methodically for small insects in the canopy. They nest in tree hollows and occasionally in ground burrows.
