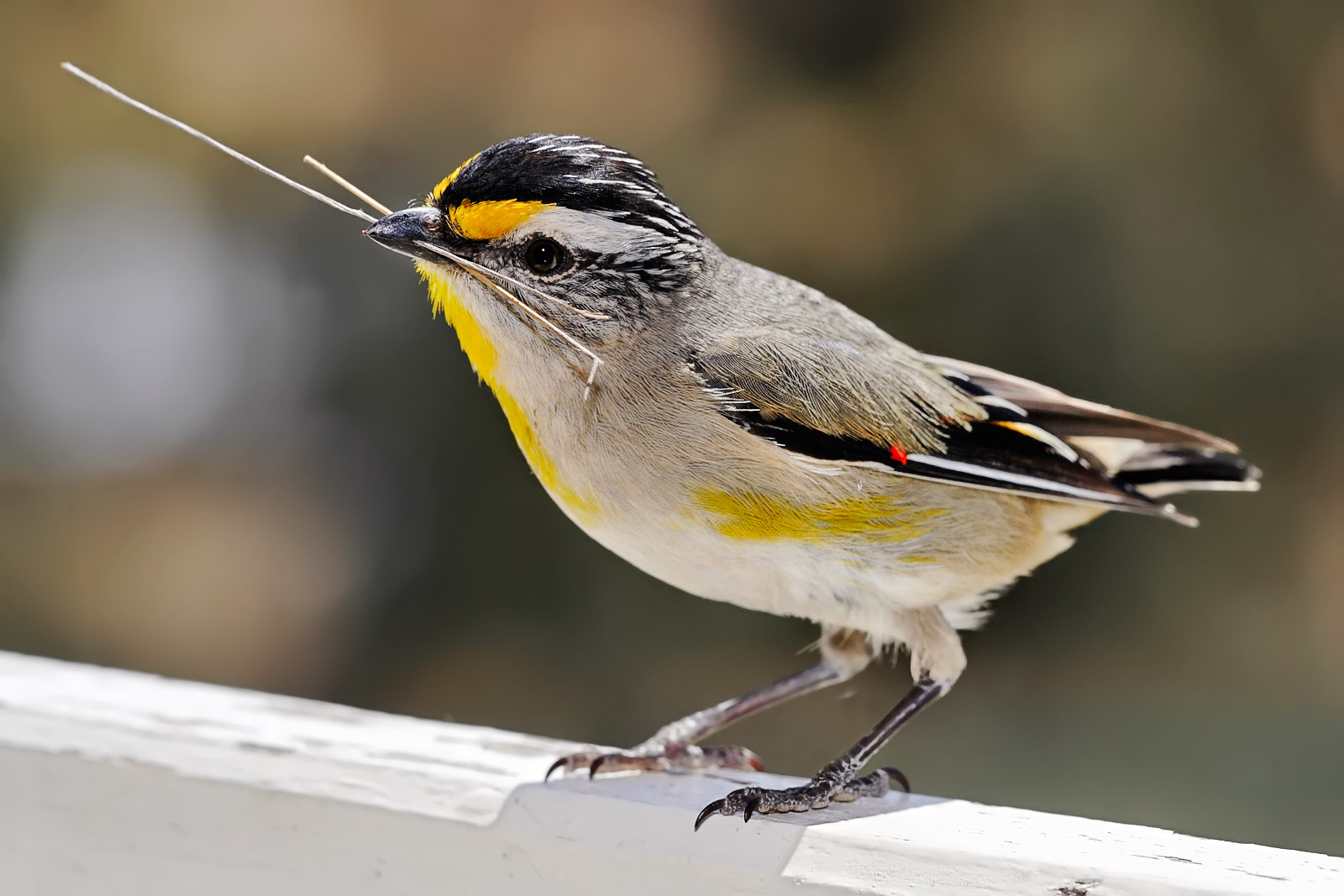
- Pardalotus striatus ornatus

Conservation status
- Least Concern (IUCN 3.1)

Scientific classification
- Kingdom: Animalia
- Phylum: Chordata
- Class: Aves
- Order: Passeriformes
- Family: Pardalotidae
- Genus: Pardalotus
- Species: P. striatus

Binomial name
- Pardalotus striatus (Gmelin, JF, 1789)

= Striated pardalote =

Species of bird

The striated pardalote (Pardalotus striatus) is the least colourful and most common of the four pardalote species. Other common names include pickwick, wittachew and chip-chip. It is a very small, short-tailed bird that is more often heard than seen, foraging noisily for lerps and other small creatures in the treetops.

== Taxonomy ==
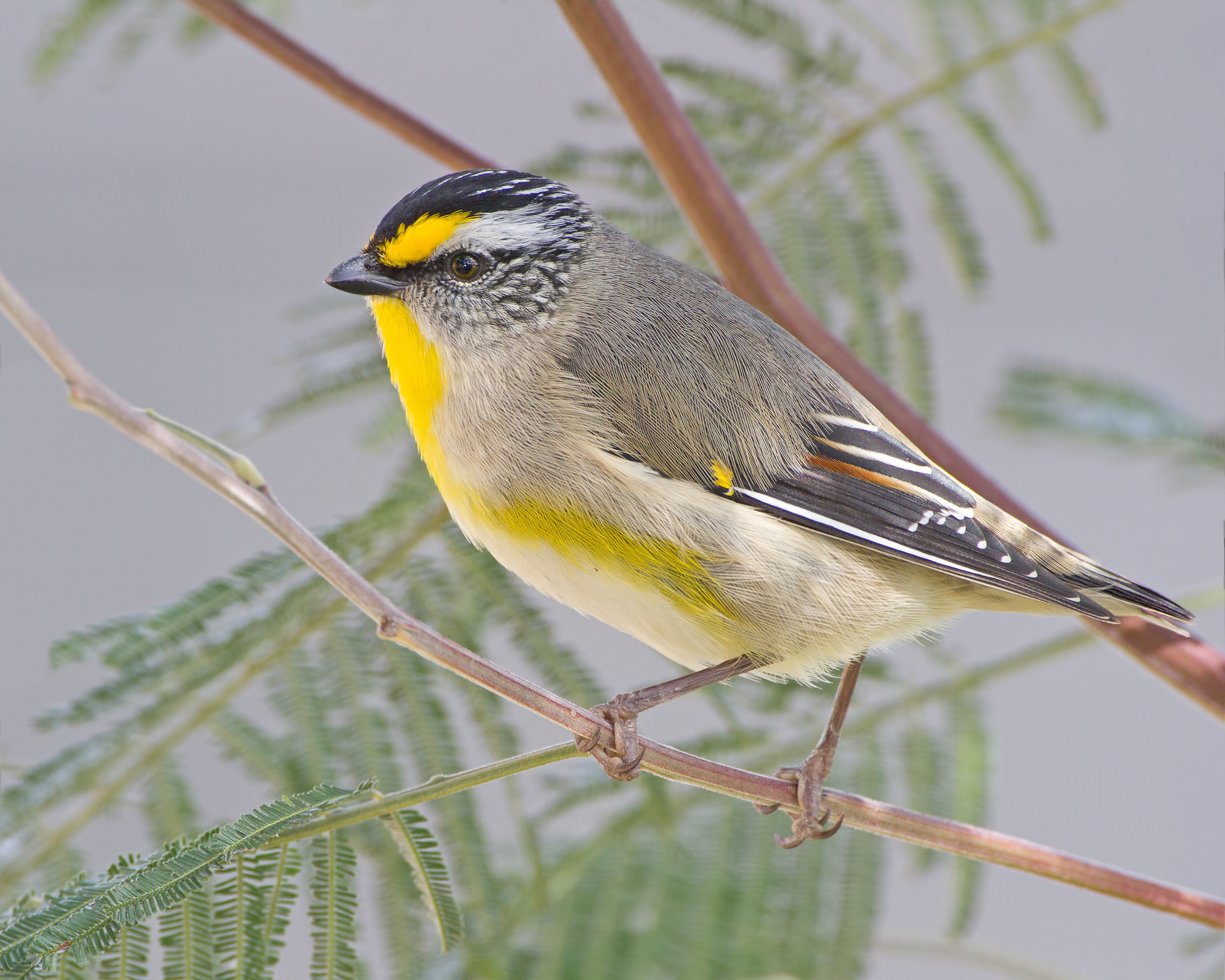
Nominate race, note the yellow spot on the wing

The striated pardalote was formally described in 1789 by the German naturalist Johann Friedrich Gmelin in his revised and expanded edition of Carl Linnaeus's Systema Naturae. He placed it with the manakins in the genus Pipra and coined the binomial name Pipra striata. Gmelin based his description on the "striped-headed manakin" that had been described and illustrated in 1783 by the English ornithologist John Latham in his book A General Synopsis of Birds. Latham had examined a specimen in the collection of the naturalist Joseph Banks. The type locality is Tasmania. The striated pardalote is now placed with the three other pardalotes in the genus Pardalotus that was introduced in 1816 by the French ornithologist Louis Pierre Vieillot.

Six subspecies are recognised:

- P. s. uropygialis Gould, 1840 – northeast Western Australia to Cape York Peninsula, northeast Queensland (north Australia)
- P. s. melvillensis Mathews, 1912 – Tiwi Islands (north of Northern Territory; central north Australia)
- P. s. melanocephalus Gould, 1838 – central east to southeast Queensland (east Australia)
- P. s. ornatus Temminck, 1826 – northeast New South Wales to southeast Victoria (southeast Australia)
- P. s. substriatus Mathews, 1912 – west, south Western Australia to central west Queensland and west Victoria (west, central Australia)
- P. s. striatus (Gmelin, JF, 1789) – breeds on Bass Strait islands and Tasmania; non-breeding in east, southeast Australia

In the past, the nominate, substriatus and ornatus races were sometimes treated as separate species. The three northern races uropygialis, melvillensis and melanocephalus were treated as a fourth species. They are all now considered as subspecies of the striated pardalote as there is substantial evidence of interbreeding.

== Description ==
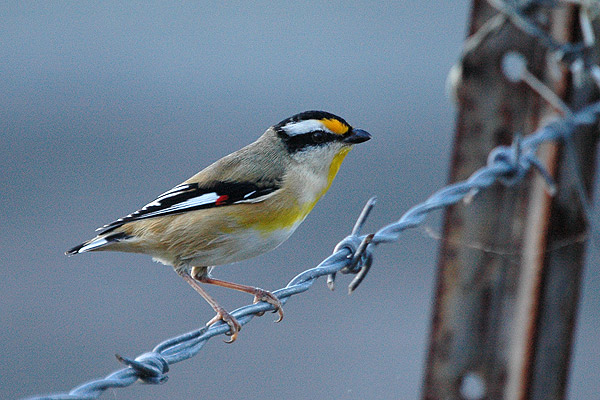
Black-headed race of striated pardalote near Brisbane, Australia

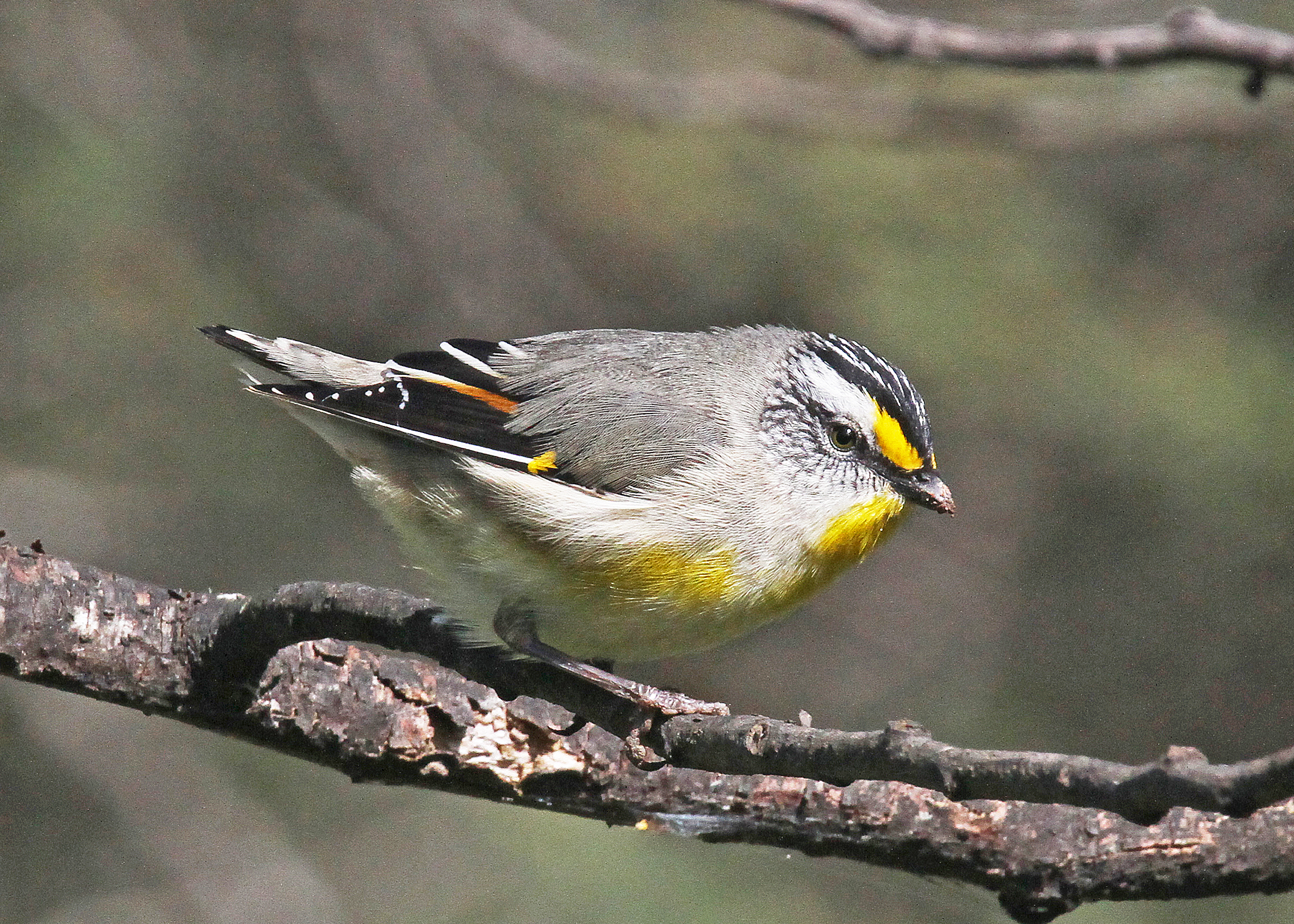
Yellow-tipped pardalote near Loongana, Tasmania, Australia

The striated pardalote's plumage varies considerably across its range. The crown is black, with subspecies substriatus, striatus and ornatus having white streaks. The eyebrow is white, starting with a yellow mark near the beak. All races have a white stripe on the wing and olive backs. The nominate race has a yellow spot on the wing, whilst the other subspecies have a red dot. The male and female are similar, juveniles have duller plumage. Similar species include the spotted pardalote and the red-browed pardalote.

== Distribution and habitat ==
Striated pardalotes occupy a vast range of habitat types from tall mountain rainforest to arid scrubland, although they favour eucalyptus forest and woodlands. They are found in all parts of Australia except some of the Western Australian deserts.

== Behaviour ==
=== Feeding ===
Striated pardalotes feed on insects and insect larvae. They usually do so in the high foliage of eucalyptus trees, but may come closer to the ground where there are lower shrubs. Feeding takes place in small groups.

==== Breeding ====
Breeding occurs from June to February. Two to five white, oval-shaped eggs are laid in a nest is made of bark fiber, rootlets and fine grass, and placed in tree hollow, a tunnel excavated in the side of a bank or within crevices in man-made objects. Both sexes incubate and care for the young.

==== Call ====
Call is a clear, sharp, musical witta-witta, the second part slightly lower, repeated regularly in intervals for long periods; striated pardalotes also give off soft, low trills.

== Gallery ==
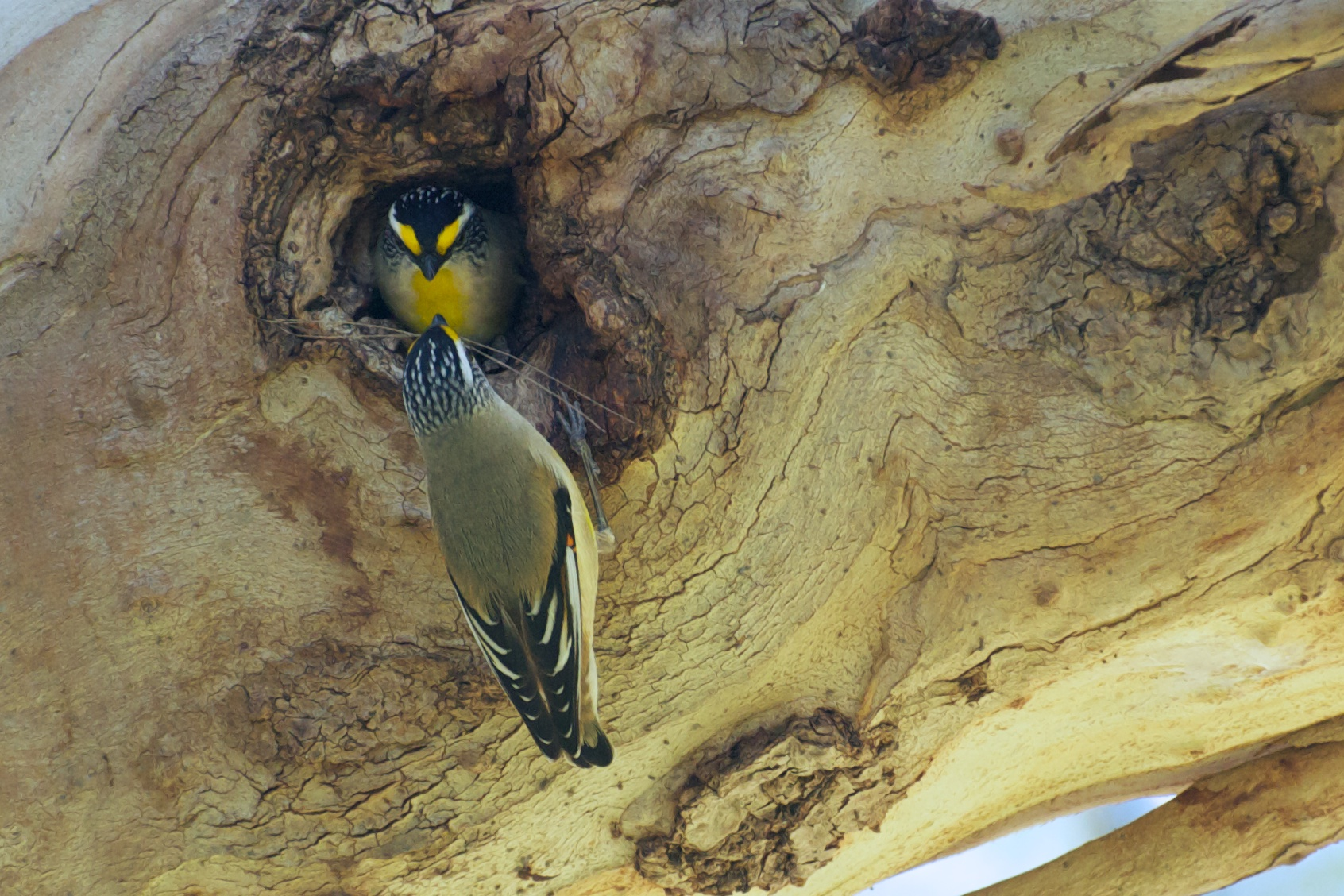
Building a nest - Redcliffe, Perth, Western Australia

Rush Creek, SE Queensland, Australia
