= Frederick Polydore Nodder =

English flora and fauna illustrator (1770–1801)

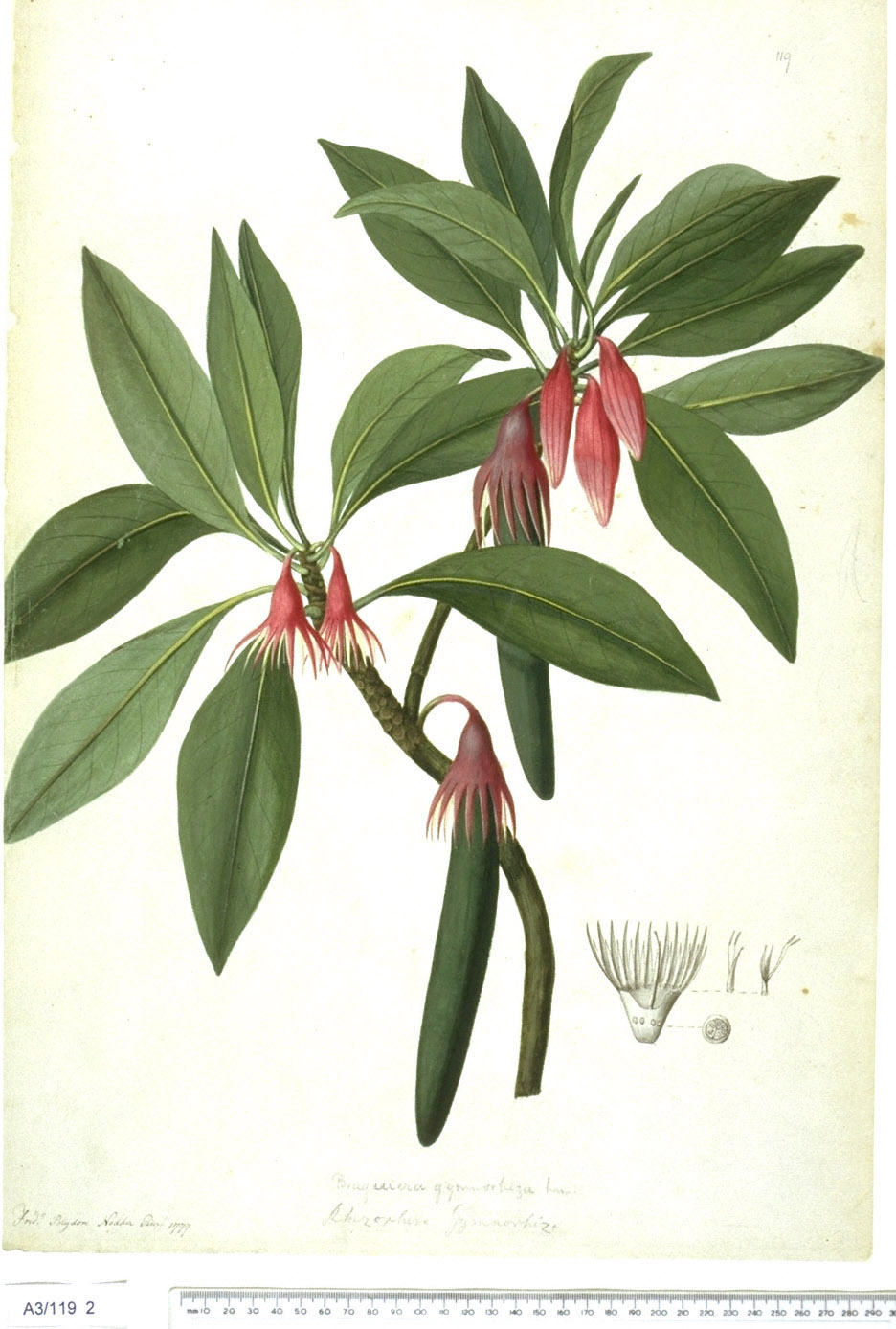
Bruguiera gymnorhiza by Frederick Polydore Nodder

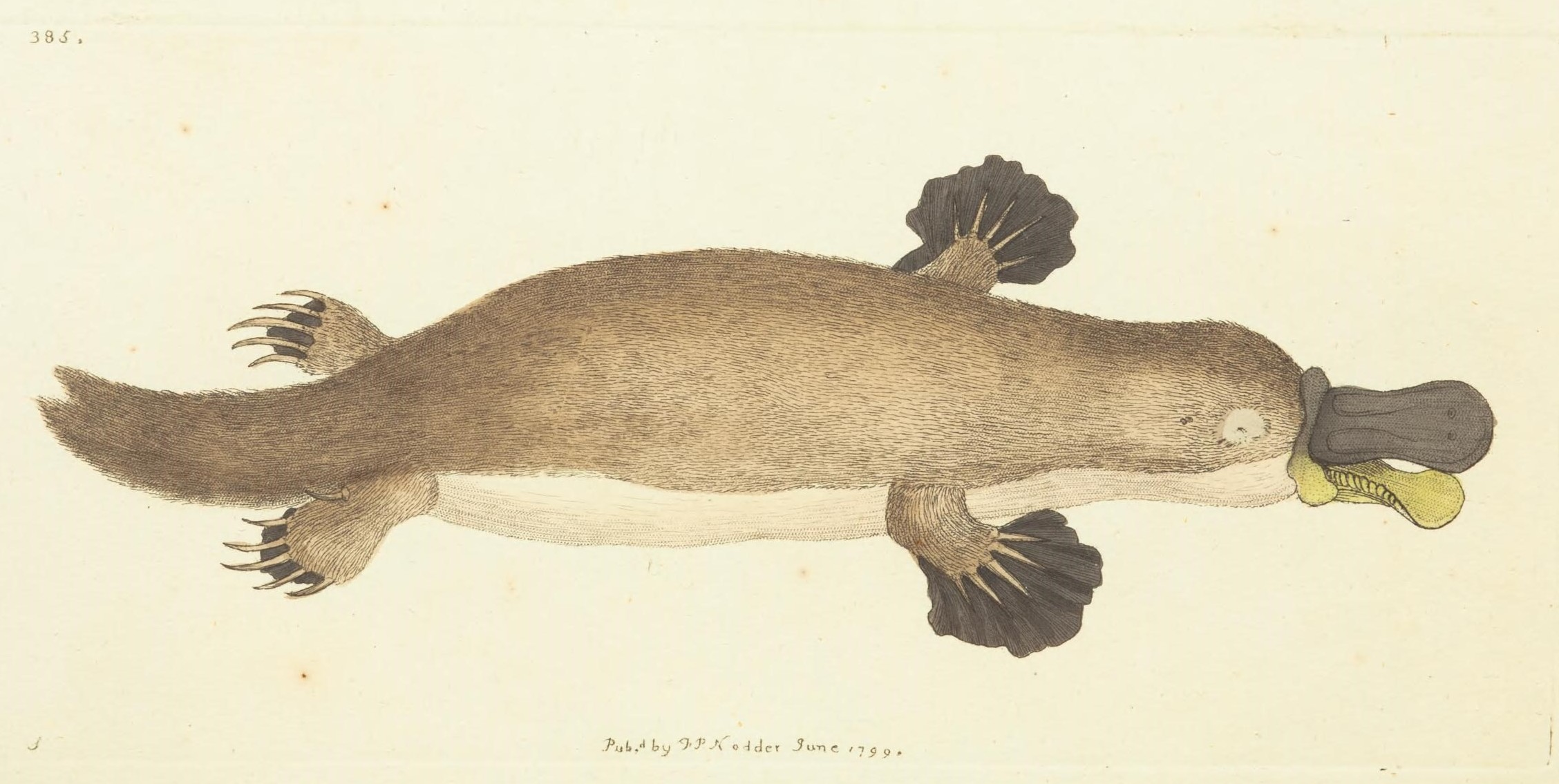
First published illustration of a platypus, by Frederick Nodder in 1799

Frederick Polydore Nodder (fl. 1770 – 1801) was an English illustrator, engraver, painter, and publisher.

Nodder illustrated and published George Shaw's periodical The Naturalist's Miscellany, and Thomas Martyn's Flora Rustica. He also helped Joseph Banks prepare the Banks' Florilegium and converted most of Sydney Parkinson's Australian plant drawings from the Endeavour expedition into paintings and helped engrave them for publication. He illustrated the first published scientific description of the duck-billed platypus. There are Nodder drawings and paintings of Australian birds and butterflies in the Natural History Division of the National Museum of Ireland.

Toward the end of his life, his second son Richard P. Nodder began contributing illustrations to The Naturalist's Miscellany, and after his death Frederick's wife Elizabeth took over as publisher. Family members with other initials also contributed illustrations.

== See also ==
- Elizabeth Nodder
