= Mallee whipbird =

Conservation status
- Vulnerable (EPBC Act)

Scientific classification
- Kingdom: Animalia
- Phylum: Chordata
- Class: Aves
- Order: Passeriformes
- Family: Psophodidae
- Genus: Psophodes
- Species: P. leucogaster
- Subspecies: P. l. leucogaster

Trinomial name
- Psophodes leucogaster leucogaster Howe & Ross, 1933

Subspecies of bird

The Mallee whipbird (Psophodes leucogaster leucogaster) is a terrestrial bird that inhabits dense habitats in mallee ecosystems of south-eastern Australia. It is a rare and elusive subspecies that is more often heard than seen.

== Taxonomy ==
The Mallee whipbird is a member of the family Psophididae. The taxonomic history of the Mallee whipbird is complicated and has at times been controversial. It was previously treated as a subspecies of the Western whipbird; however, based on more recent morphological and mitochondrial DNA analysis, it is currently accepted as a subspecies of the white-bellied whipbird and a sister taxon to the Kangaroo Island whipbird.

== Distribution ==
The Mallee whipbird is endemic to coastal and inland areas of mainland southern South Australia (SA) and north-western Victoria (Vic). The subspecies is thought to consist of four highly disjunct subpopulations centred on:

1. southern Yorke Peninsula (SA);
2. southern Eyre Peninsula (SA);
3. Billiatt Conservation Park in the eastern Murray Mallee region of SA; and
4. Ngarkat Conservation Park in the eastern Murray Mallee region of SA and Big Desert Wilderness Park in north-western Vic.

These subpopulations are largely confined to protected areas; however, it is estimated that there is enough suitable habitat on private land on the Yorke and Eyre Peninsulas to facilitate sufficient dispersal to be considered a single continuous subpopulation.

The two eastern-most subpopulations are estimated to be very small and the subspecies was previously thought to be locally extinct in Ngarkat Conservation Park and north-western Victoria until surveys in late 2022 confirmed the presence of the subspecies. Whilst known to historically occur in Billiatt Conservation Park, the surveys undertaken in 2022 did not detect any individuals and this subpopulation is not thought to be locally extinct.

== Description ==
The Mallee whipbird is a medium-sized bird that is 20–25 cm in length with a wing span of 24–26.5 cm and a mass of approximately 43 - 47 g. It has a short, grey-brown, triangular erectile crest on the forehead that is often raised in alarm. The bill in adults is grey-brown, stout and slightly decurved, measuring 13–14 mm in length. Nestings and juveniles have a darkish-grey bill with a pale yellow cutting-edge (tomium). The legs are long, slender and dark-grey in colour and the wings are short and elliptical allowing for short bursts of high speed and manoeuvring through dense vegetation when seeking cover. Upper- and lowerparts are mostly dull olive to olive-grey and greyish-brown blending into a prominent white submoustachial stripe on each cheek, a broad white stripe down the breast and belly and a black chin and throat. The tail is long, graduated and fan-shaped when spread, with a rounded tip and rectrices that have a black subterminal band and white tips. The eye is dull red with a narrow grey eye-ring.

Juveniles are uniformly olive-grey-brown and are separable from adults in that they lack the black and white colouring on the cheeks, chin and throat and have a rudimentary crest. Immatures are thought to closely resemble adults within 3 months of fledging but retain juvenile remiges, coverts and rectrices.

The Mallee whipbird does not display sexual dimorphism nor seasonal variation in plumage.

=== Vocalisation ===
The Mallee whipbird has a loud and distinctive song that is often the only indication of its presence. It has been reported that the song can be audible up to 800 m away. The Mallee whipbird does not produce the typical loud, whip-crack' call of the Eastern whipbird (Psophodes olivaceus) but rather a loud, repetitive, metallic-sounding reel that has been likened to the sound of a squeaking gate. Male and female pair members frequently engage in an antiphonal duet, each with their own song - males producing a series of grating whistles and females having a shorter and less varying song. Males will defend their territory by engaging in calling periods of up to 15 minutes in duration. Singing birds occasionally perch in the open but retreat to cover immediately upon disturbance and remain concealed at the base of dense vegetation. When alarmed, individuals will produce various scolding calls and chucks.
