= Wedgebill =

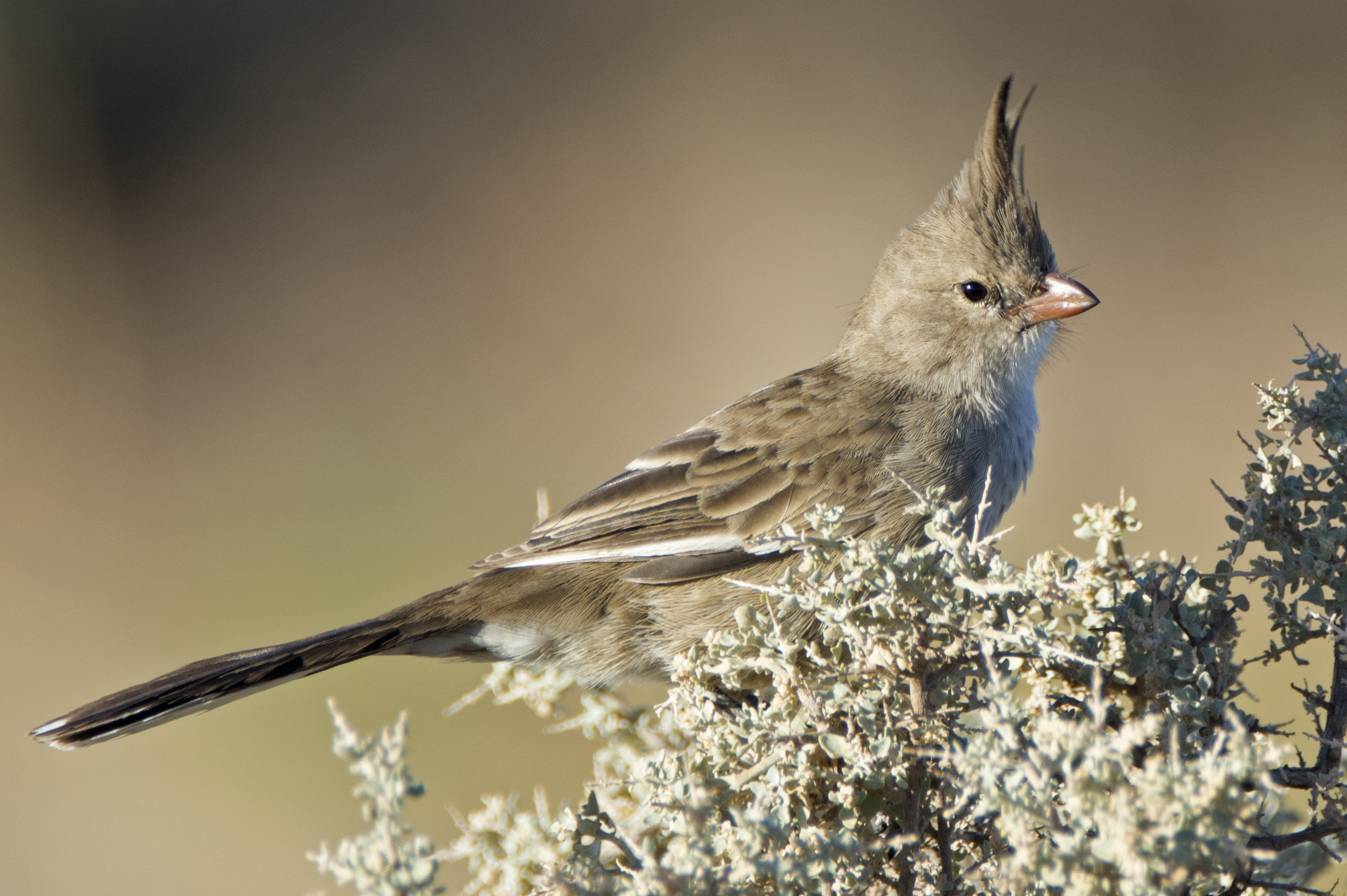
Chirruping wedgebill, Pt Augusta, South Australia

Wedgebill or wedge-bill is a common name for several birds and may refer to

- Australian endemic birds in the genus Psophodes:
  - Chiming wedgebill (Psophodes occidentalis)
  - Chirruping wedgebill (Psophodes cristatus)

== See also ==
- Cachar wedge-billed babbler
- Sikkim wedge-billed babbler
- Wedge-billed woodcreeper
