= Julian Ralph Ford =

Australian chemist and ornithologist

Dr Julian Ralph Ford (3 November 1932 – 31 January 1987) was an Australian chemist and ornithologist. He was born in Perth and graduated in chemistry from the University of Western Australia in 1955. He worked for the Shell Oil Company until 1960 when he went on to a career of lecturing on chemistry, first at the Perth Technical College and then the Western Australian Institute of Technology.

Ford's early ornithological work included a study of yellow-rumped thornbills. Later he focused on the speciation of birds in inland Australia, making several expeditions in the course of his research. He also discovered that the wedgebill comprised two separate species, the chirruping and chiming wedgebills. He was a member of the Royal Australasian Ornithologists Union (RAOU) and served on its Taxonomic Advisory Committee. He also contributed numerous papers to its journal, the Emu. In 1983 he was awarded a PhD by the University of Western Australia for his ornithological studies.

Julian Ralph Ford is commemorated in the scientific name of a species of lizard, Ctenophorus fordi.

== Sources ==
- Davies SJJF (1987). "Obituary. Dr Julian Ford". Emu 87: 132.
- Robin, Libby (2001). The Flight of the Emu: a hundred years of Australian ornithology 1901-2001. Carlton, Victoria: Melbourne University Press. ISBN 0-522-84987-3
- Keast, J. Allen (1990). "In Memoriam: Julian R. Ford, 1932-1987". The Auk 107: 601.
