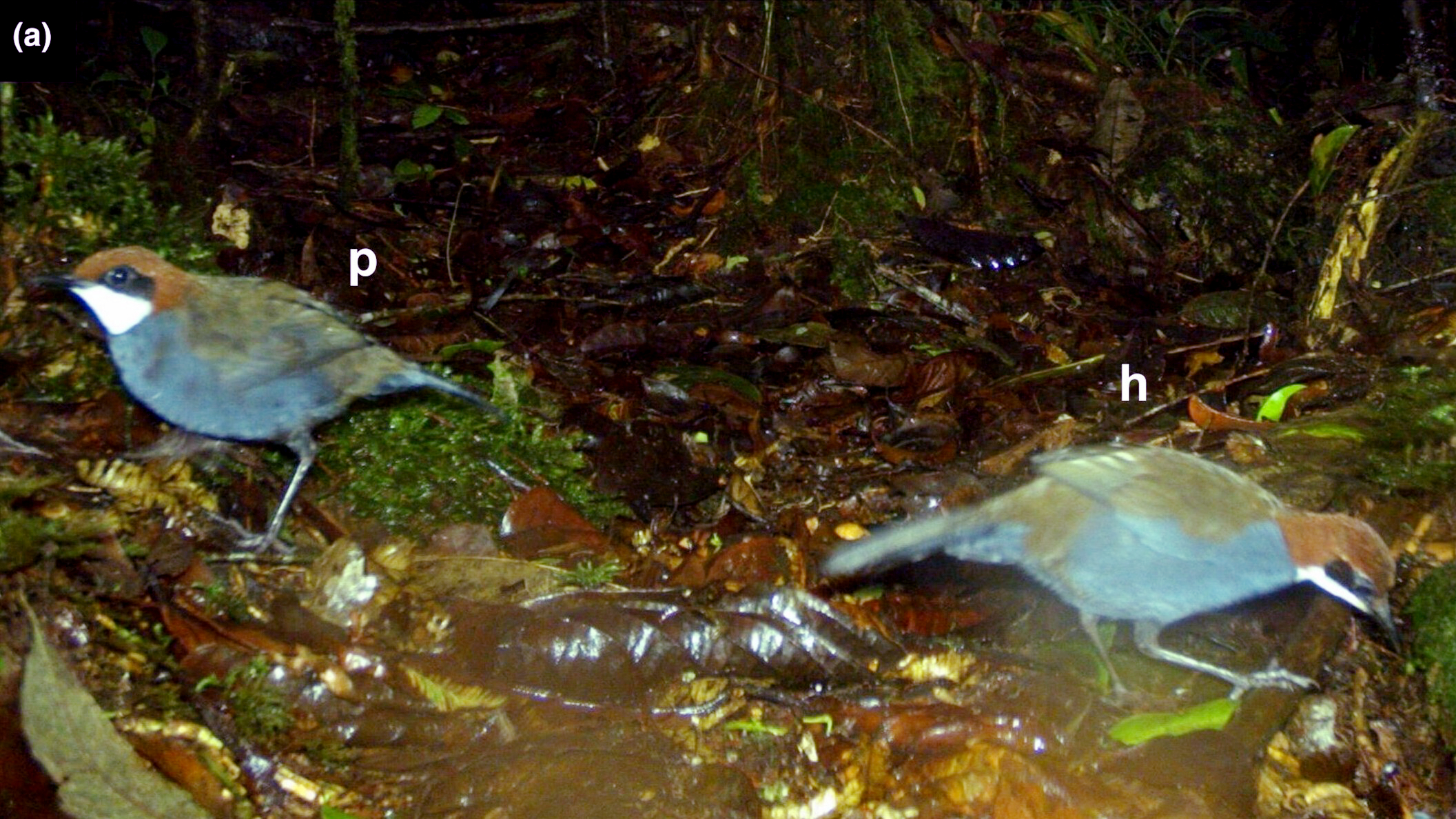
- Holotype (h) and paratype (p) individuals

Scientific classification
- Kingdom: Animalia
- Phylum: Chordata
- Class: Aves
- Order: Passeriformes
- Family: Cinclosomatidae
- Genus: Ptilorrhoa
- Species: P. urrissia

Binomial name
- Ptilorrhoa urrissia Woxvold et al., 2025
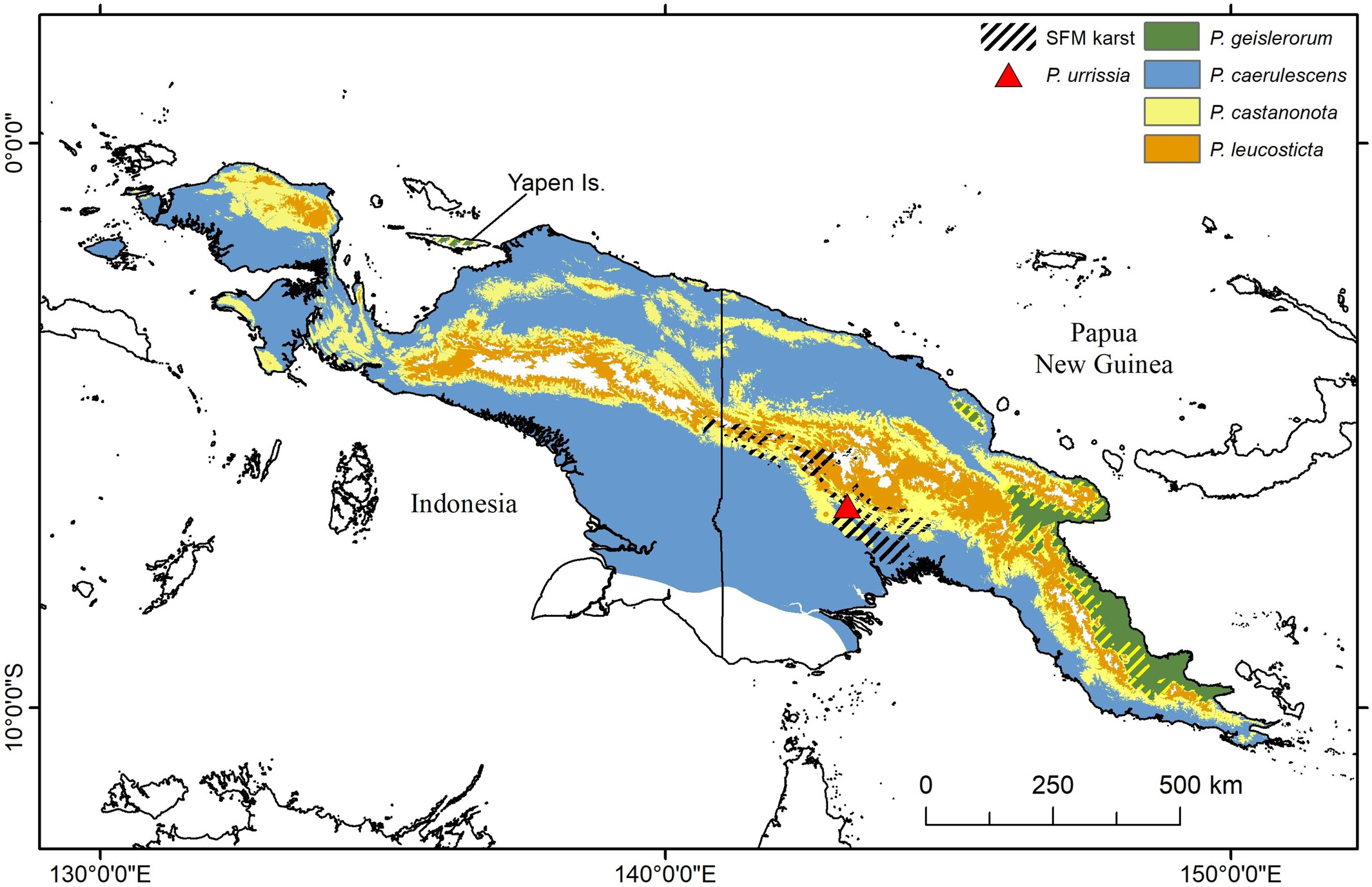
- Type locality [▲] in Papua New Guinea

= Hooded jewel-babbler =

Species of bird

The hooded jewel-babbler (Ptilorrhoa urrissia) is a species of bird in the family Cinclosomatidae, endemic to the forested karst of the Southern Fold Mountains in Papua New Guinea. It is one of five named species in the genus Ptilorrhoa (jewel-babblers), currently known only from camera trap photograph sequences obtained between 2017 and 2024.

== Taxonomy ==
The name urrissia refers to location at it was discovered, "Urrissia", in the local Fasu language.

== Description ==
Two plumage forms of the species have been recorded. Both forms share the characteristic black mask and white throat of most Ptilorrhoa species, with a chesnut crown and nape. Plumage type A (which is presumed to be the male pattern) shows a blue dorsal and ventral plumage below the neck. Plumage type B (which is presumed to be the female pattern) is similar to type A but has predominantly olive-green upperparts and rear flanks, and a narrow white supercilium has been seen in some individuals of this plumage type.

== Distribution ==
The species appears to be a permanent resident on the top of Iagifu Ridge, which is located in the Southern Highlands Province of Papua New Guinea. The species is currently only known from the Iagifu Ridge population, but it is speculated that the located supports part of a highly fragmented population that inhabits isolated low mountains where the spotted jewel-babbler is not present. All known specimens were seen at an altitude range of 1335–1400 m, from an area of less than 22 hectares. Suitable sites may be restricted to the area between Mount Bosavi and Mount Karimui in southern Papua New Guinea.

== Behaviour and ecology ==
=== Vocalizations ===
No songs have yet been attributed to the species. Two call types have been recorded on video. The first is a harsh, rasping call centred on about 7 kHz and lasting 2 to 2.4 seconds. It contains four rasping notes delivered over a quieter hissing sound, with a brief introductory note followed by three longer swelling notes. The second is a single clear, up-slurred note lasting 0.3 seconds, rising from 3.7 to 6.6 kHz and increasing in volume at the end.

== Discovery ==
The species was originally photographed by camera traps on Iagifu Ridge in 2017. Fieldwork was led by Iain Woxvold and included local collaborators including Banak Gamui and Bonny Koane.

=== Threats ===
The area that the bird lives in faces pressure from logging and development.
