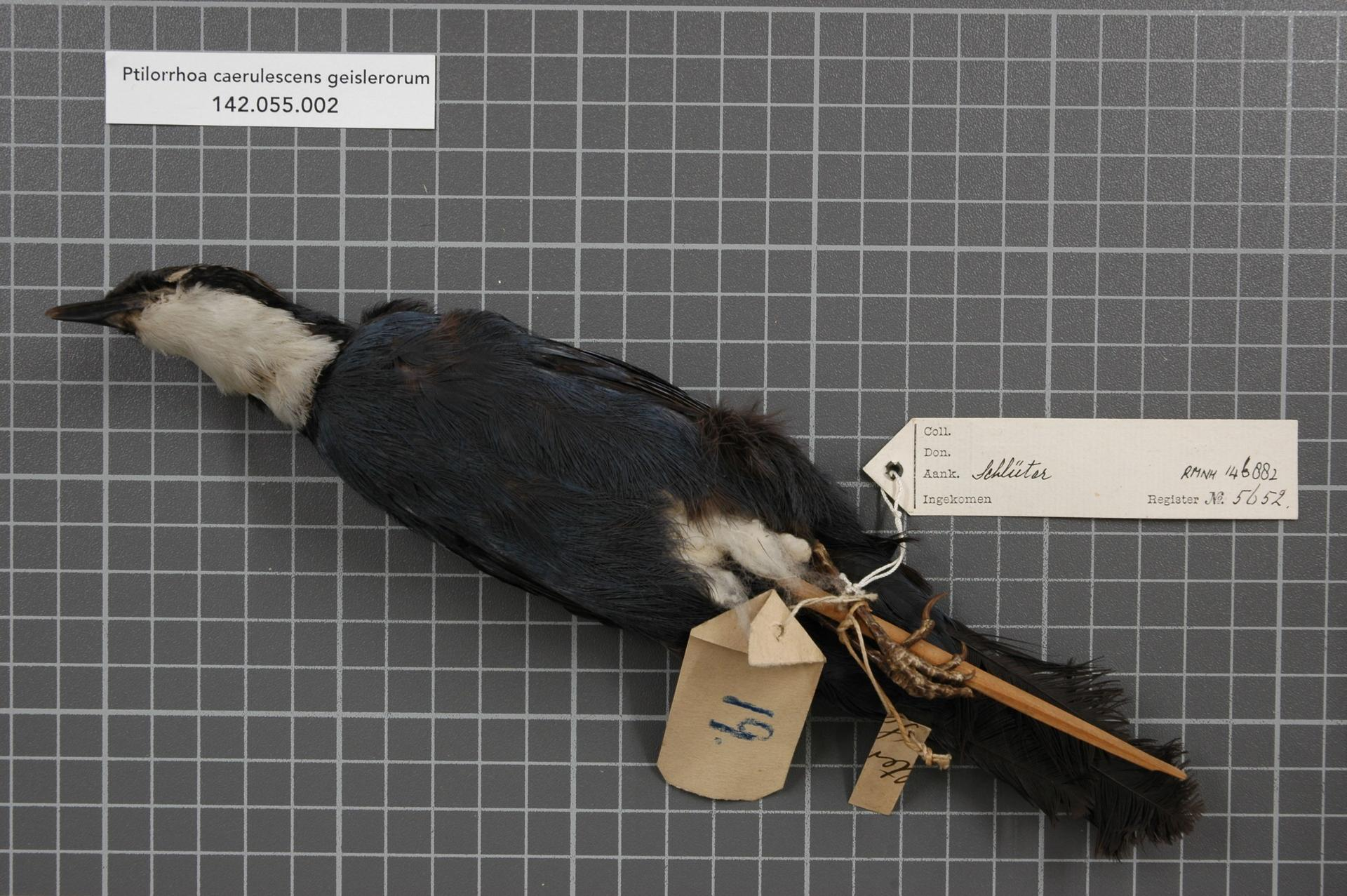
- Ptilorrhoa caerulescens geislerorum (Meyer, 1892)

Conservation status
- Least Concern (IUCN 3.1)

Scientific classification
- Kingdom: Animalia
- Phylum: Chordata
- Class: Aves
- Order: Passeriformes
- Family: Cinclosomatidae
- Genus: Ptilorrhoa
- Species: P. geislerorum

Binomial name
- Ptilorrhoa geislerorum (A.B. Meyer, 1892)

= Brown-headed jewel-babbler =

Species of bird

The brown-headed jewel-babbler (Ptilorrhoa geislerorum), also known as the dimorphic jewel-babbler or brown-capped jewel-babbler, is a jewel-babbler in the family Cinclosomatidae. It is now usually considered to be distinct from the blue jewel-babbler, separated altitudinally and by varying behaviour, calls and female plumage.
