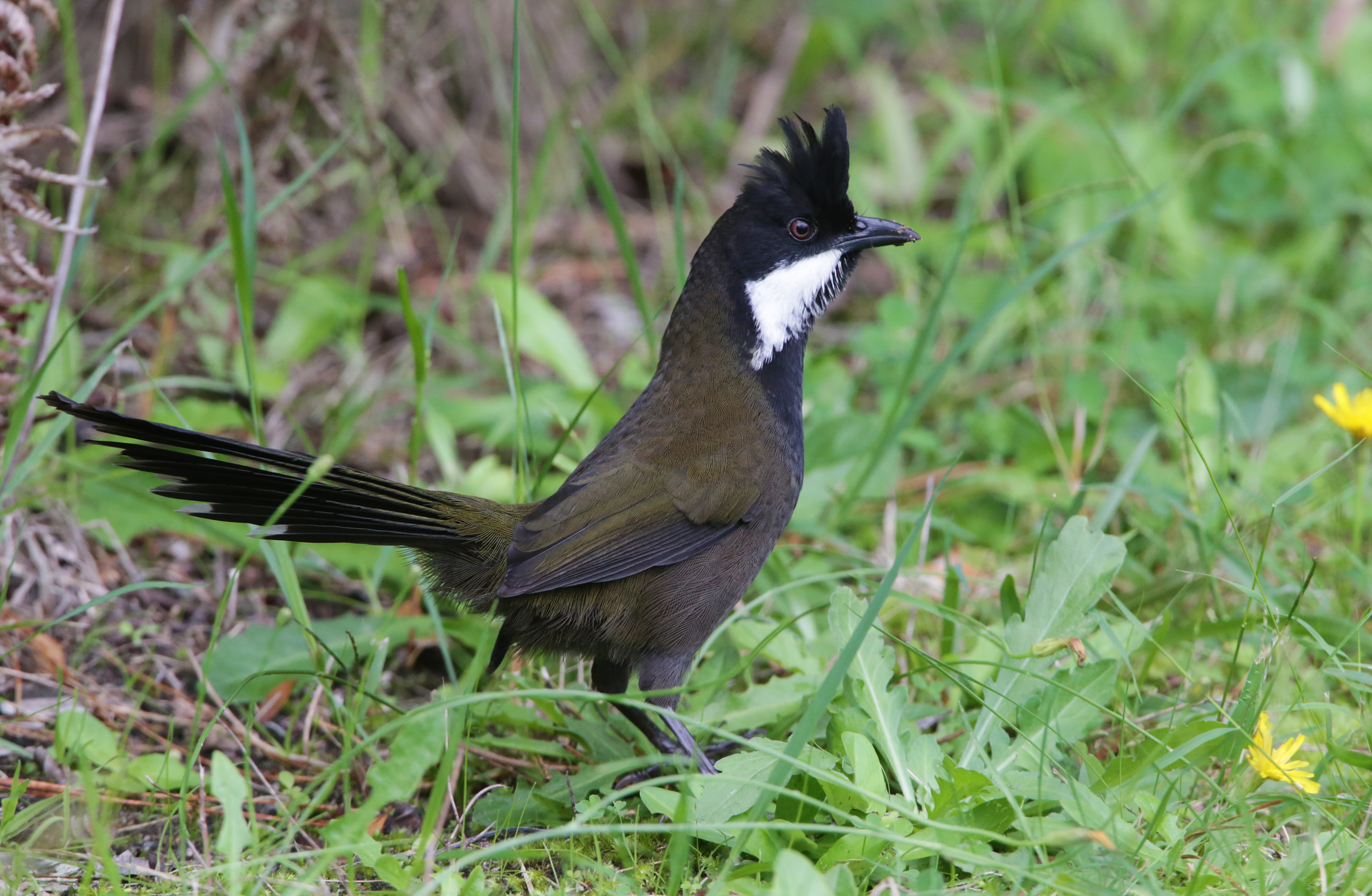
- Eastern whipbird (Psophodes olivaceus)

Scientific classification
- Kingdom: Animalia
- Phylum: Chordata
- Class: Aves
- Order: Passeriformes
- Superfamily: Orioloidea
- Family: Psophodidae; Bonaparte, 1854

Genera
- See list below

= Psophodidae =

Family of birds

Psophodidae is a family of passerine birds native to Australia and nearby areas. It has a complicated taxonomic history. The family has a complicated taxonomic history. Quail-thrushes (Cinclosoma) and jewel-babblers (Ptilorrhoa) were formerly included in a broadly circumscribed Psophodidae, but molecular phylogenetic studies showed this assemblage to be polyphyletic, then quail-thrushes and jewel-babblers form a separate lineage now recognized as the family Cinclosomatidae.

== Taxonomy ==
The quail-thrushes, jewel-babblers, whipbirds and wedgebills were traditionally included with the logrunners (Orthonyx) in the family Orthonychidae. Sometimes the Malaysian rail-babbler and blue-capped ifrit (Ifrita kowaldi) were also included in the family. In 1985, Sibley and Ahlquist found that the logrunners were not related to the others and included only the logrunners in the Orthonychidae. They treated the others as the subfamily Cinclosomatinae within their expanded family Corvidae.

A number of authors later treated the quail-thrushes and allies as the family Cinclosomatidae, a name coined by Gregory Mathews in 1921–1922. However, if the whipbirds are included in the family, the older name Psophodidae Bonaparte, 1854 has priority. If the Malaysian rail-babbler is also included, the name Eupetidae Bonaparte, 1850 has priority.

The Malaysian rail-babbler has now been shown to be unrelated to the others, probably being an early offshoot of the Passerida. Another study found the quail-thrushes and jewel-babblers to be related to each other but did not show them to have a close relationship with Psophodes or Ifrita.

== Description ==
Whipbirds and wedgebills are 19–31 cm long. They are mainly olive-green or brown in colour and have a crest.

== Distribution and habitat ==
The whipbirds and wedgebills are all found in Australia, occurring in a range of habitats from rainforest to arid scrub. The western whipbird is considered to be near-threatened because of habitat loss and fires while the Papuan whipbird is classed as data deficient.

== Behaviour ==
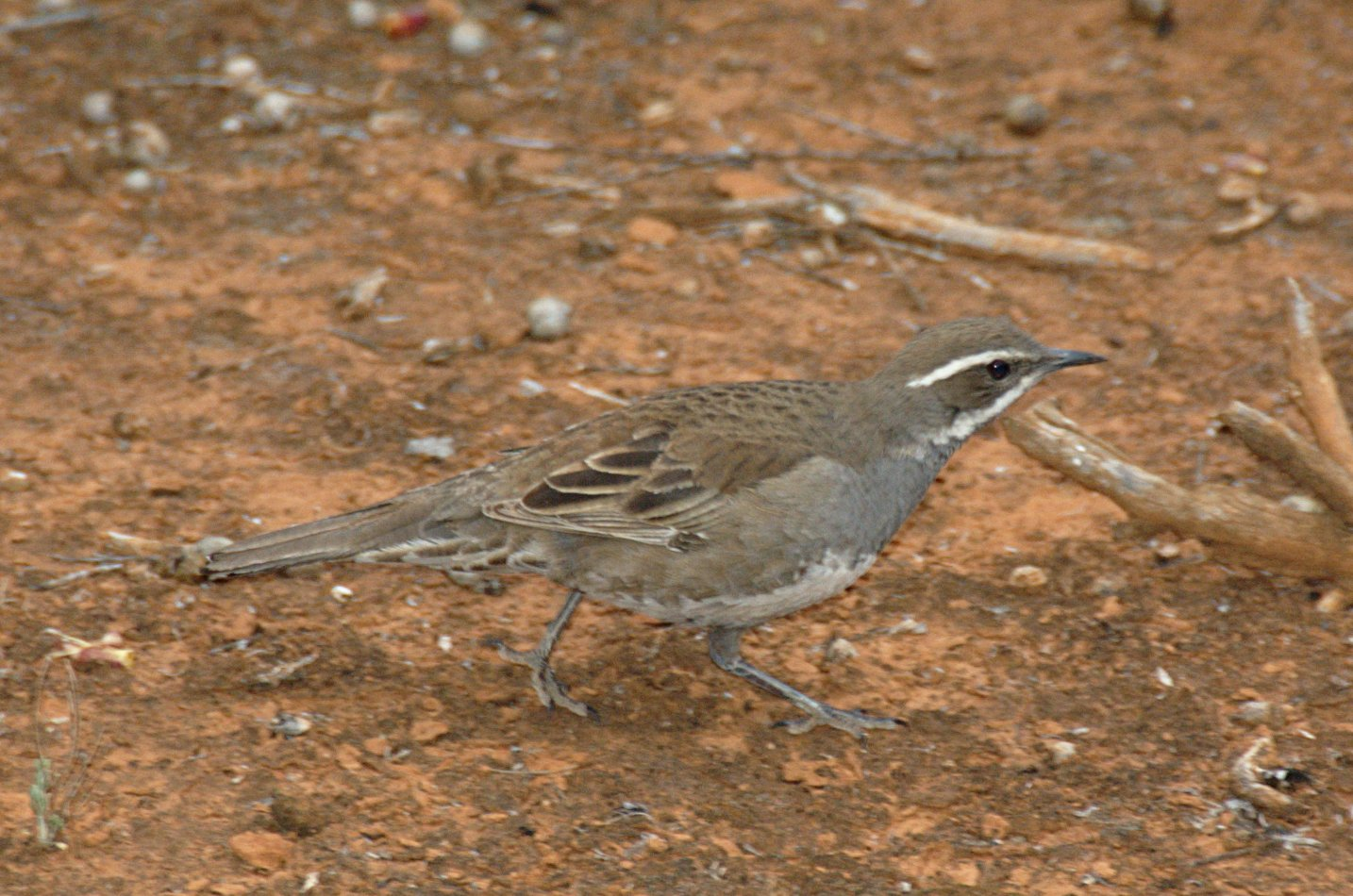
Chestnut-backed quail-thrush (Cinclosoma castanotum)

They are terrestrial birds which fly fairly weakly and prefer to squat or run when disturbed. They forage on the ground feeding mainly on insects and other invertebrates. In the desert, quail-thrushes also eat some seeds.

They build a cup-shaped nest among shrubs or on the ground. Two or three eggs are laid.

== Species list ==
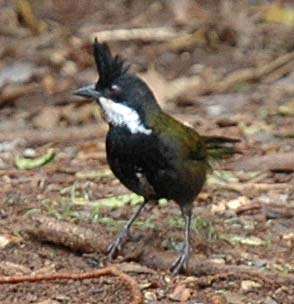
Eastern whipbird (Psophodes olivaceus)

- Genus Androphobus
  - Papuan whipbird, Androphobus viridis
- Genus Psophodes
  - Eastern whipbird, Psophodes olivaceus
  - Black-throated whipbird, Psophodes nigrogularis
  - White-bellied whipbird, Psophodes leucogaster
  - Chiming wedgebill, Psophodes occidentalis
  - Chirruping wedgebill, Psophodes cristatus
