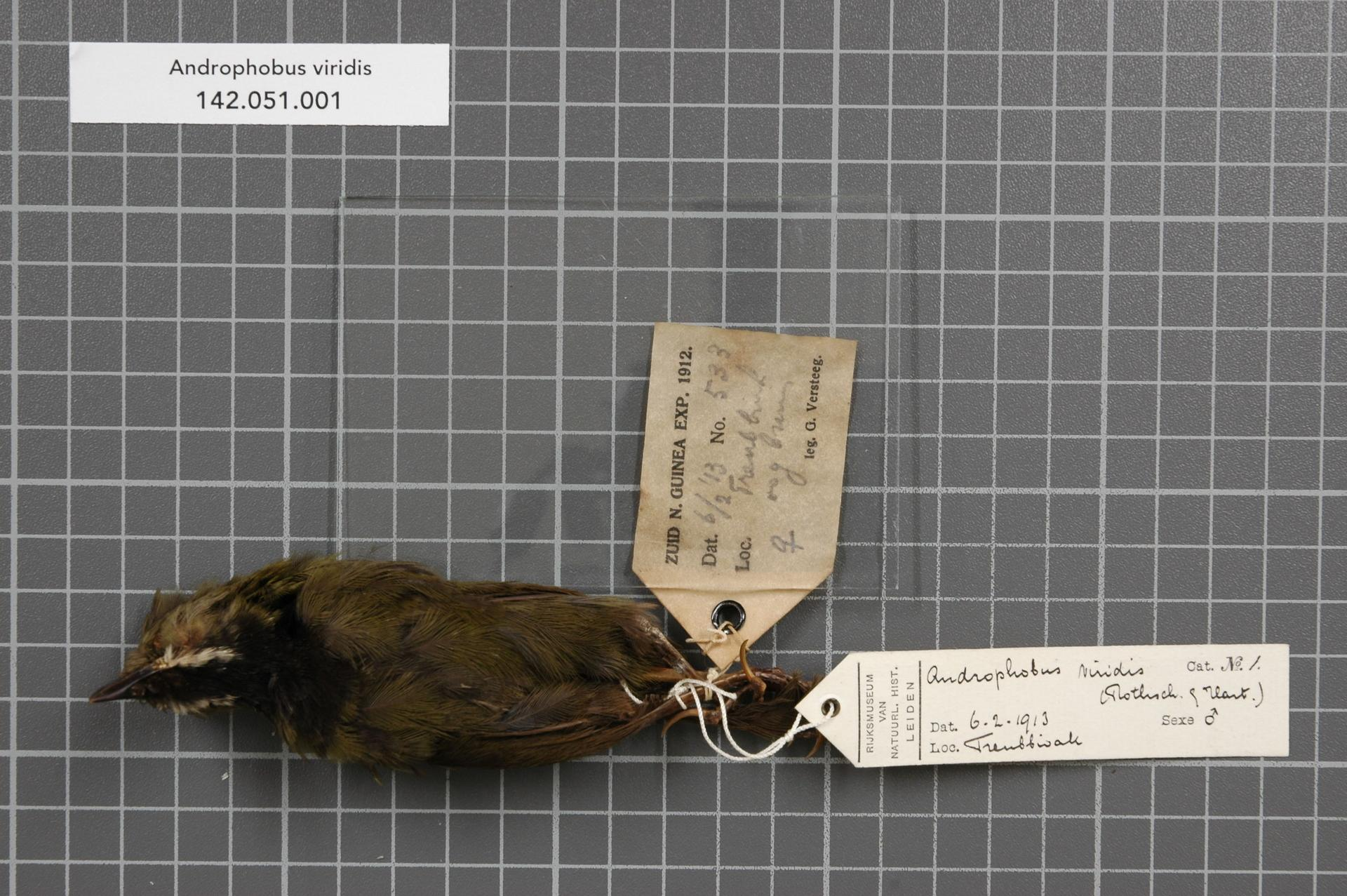

Conservation status
- Least Concern (IUCN 3.1)

Scientific classification
- Kingdom: Animalia
- Phylum: Chordata
- Class: Aves
- Order: Passeriformes
- Family: Psophodidae
- Genus: Androphobus; Hartert & Paludan, 1934
- Species: A. viridis

Binomial name
- Androphobus viridis (Rothschild & Hartert, 1911)

= Papuan whipbird =

Species of bird

The Papuan whipbird (Androphobus viridis) is a little-known and unobtrusive species of bird in the family Psophodidae. It is monotypic within the genus Androphobus. It is found in Western New Guinea.

It is currently classified as Least concern. This is probably due to the fact that it is very secretive, and, despite not being too restricted, thinly spread throughout its range; it is likely to be overlooked unless singing. It is apparently insectivorous.

== Description ==
This species is 16–17 cm (6.3–6.7 in), making it significantly smaller than Australian whipbirds. Males have a moustachial white stripe and black throat while females are all moss green. Juveniles are darker green with blackish faces and underparts.

== Habitat ==
It lives in montane forest, from 1,400 to 2,700 meters, where it inhabits the thick understory. It appears unlikely to be affected by habitat destruction, as steep slopes and inaccessible terrain make the area a difficult target for logging activity. However, this also contributes to the lack of information on this species, as the area is little visited by ornithologists. Specimens were collected in the Snow Mountains, along with other mountainous areas around the Pegunungan Makoke; despite being recorded at only seven sites, it is likely that this species occurs far more widely.
