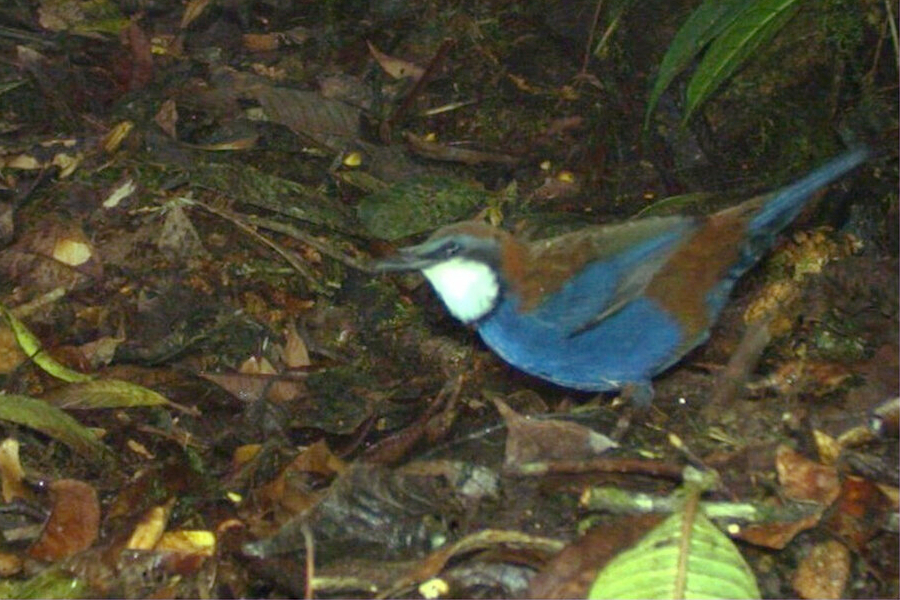

Conservation status
- Least Concern (IUCN 3.1)

Scientific classification
- Kingdom: Animalia
- Phylum: Chordata
- Class: Aves
- Order: Passeriformes
- Family: Cinclosomatidae
- Genus: Ptilorrhoa
- Species: P. castanonota

Binomial name
- Ptilorrhoa castanonota (Salvadori, 1876)

= Chestnut-backed jewel-babbler =

Species of bird

The chestnut-backed jewel-babbler (Ptilorrhoa castanonota) is a species of bird in the family Cinclosomatidae. It is endemic to New Guinea. Its natural habitats are subtropical or tropical moist lowland forests and subtropical or tropical moist montane forests.
