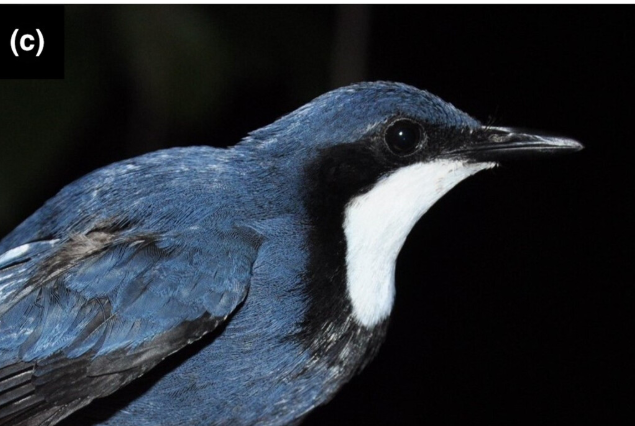

Scientific classification
- Kingdom: Animalia
- Phylum: Chordata
- Class: Aves
- Order: Passeriformes
- Family: Cinclosomatidae
- Genus: Ptilorrhoa
- Species: P. nigricrissus

Binomial name
- Ptilorrhoa nigricrissus (Salvadori, 1876)

Synonyms
- Ptilorrhoa caerulescens nigricrissus

= Southern blue jewel-babbler =

Species of bird

The southern blue jewel-babbler (Ptilorrhoa nigricrissus) is a species of bird in the family Cinclosomatidae, endemic to the southern lowlands of New Guinea. It was described by Tommaso Salvadori in 1876. It is monotypic.

== Taxonomy and systematics ==
This species was formerly considered conspecific with the northern blue jewel-babbler (Ptilorrhoa caerulescens), but was split from it based on morphological differences, ecology and the call.

== Description ==
This species is similar to the blue jewel-babbler, but the female has a small white stripe above the eye, the undertail is black, and the undertail coverts are partly marked with black.

== Habits and habitat ==
This species lacks the characteristic hezok call of the blue jewel-babbler.

This species is found in the southern lowlands of New Guinea in both Indonesian Western New Guinea and Papua New Guinea. It is found from the Wanggar River and Etna Bay to the Milne Bay. In the Bird's Neck Isthmus, its range overlaps with the blue jewel-babbler, however, it separates altitudinally, with this species occupying a higher elevation.
