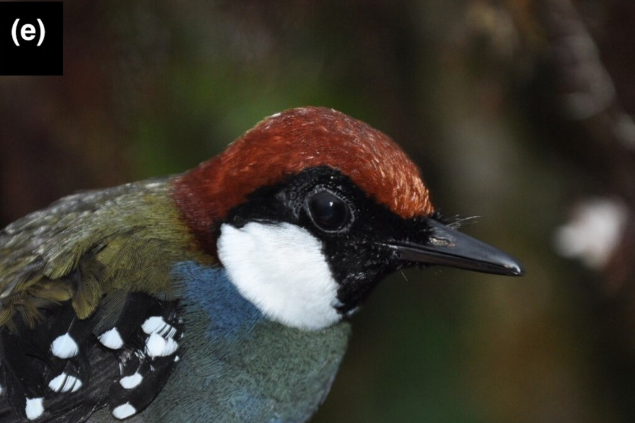

Conservation status
- Least Concern (IUCN 3.1)

Scientific classification
- Kingdom: Animalia
- Phylum: Chordata
- Class: Aves
- Order: Passeriformes
- Family: Cinclosomatidae
- Genus: Ptilorrhoa
- Species: P. leucosticta

Binomial name
- Ptilorrhoa leucosticta (Sclater, PL, 1874)

= Spotted jewel-babbler =

Species of bird

The spotted jewel-babbler (Ptilorrhoa leucosticta) is a species of bird in the family Cinclosomatidae. It is found in the New Guinea Highlands. Its natural habitat is subtropical or tropical moist montane forests.
