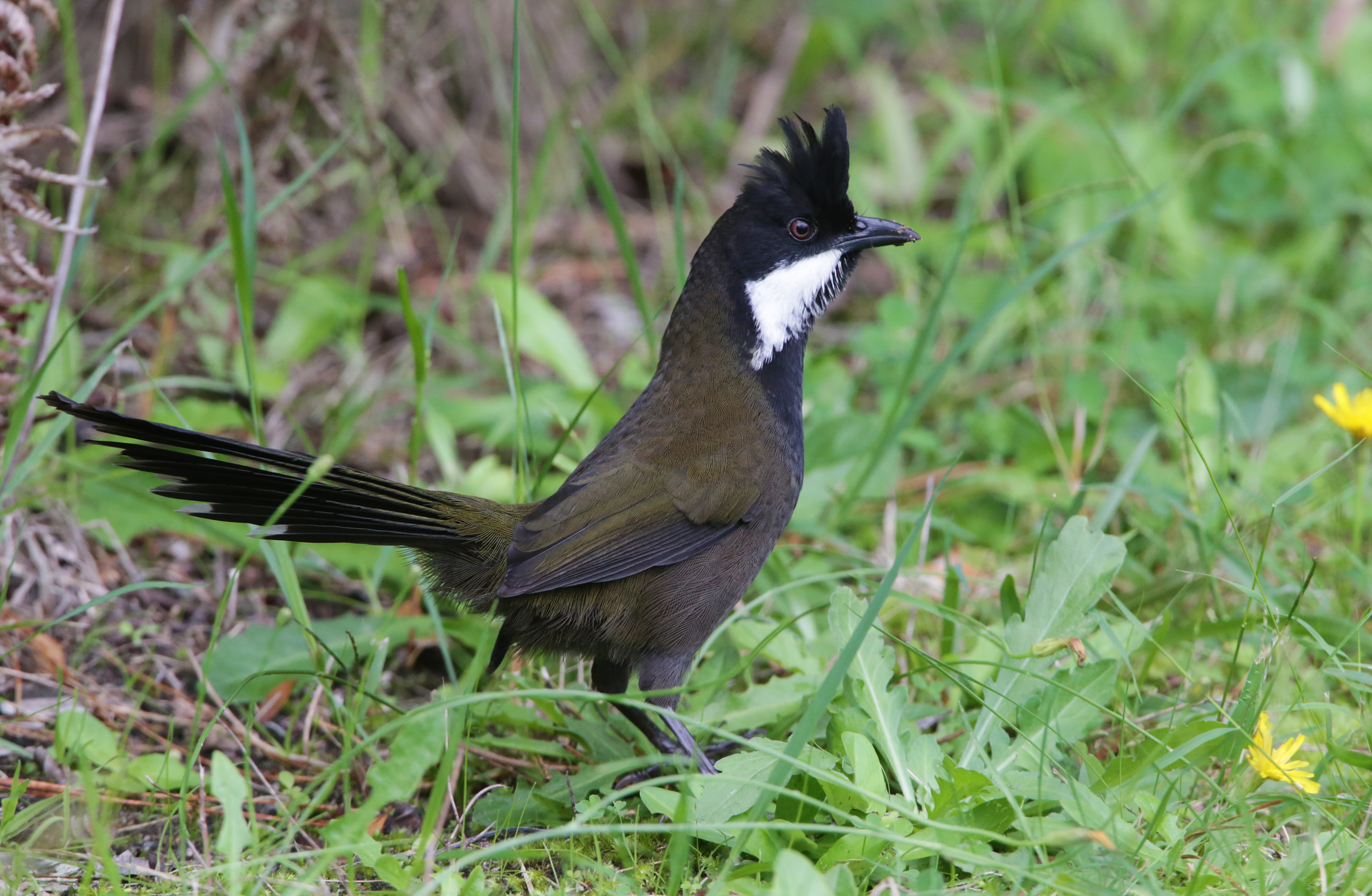
- P. o. olivaceus, New South Wales Eastern whipbird whistle, recorded at Tamborine Mountain, Queensland, Australia

Conservation status
- Least Concern (IUCN 3.1)

Scientific classification
- Kingdom: Animalia
- Phylum: Chordata
- Class: Aves
- Order: Passeriformes
- Family: Psophodidae
- Genus: Psophodes
- Species: P. olivaceus

Binomial name
- Psophodes olivaceus (Latham, 1801)

= Eastern whipbird =

Species of bird

The eastern whipbird (Psophodes olivaceus) is an insectivorous passerine bird native to the east coast of Australia. Its whip-crack song is a familiar sound in forests of eastern Australia. Two subspecies are recognised. Heard much more often than seen, it is dark olive-green and black in colour with a distinctive white cheek patch and a black crest. The male and female are similar in plumage.

== Taxonomy ==
The eastern whipbird was mistakenly described by John Latham as two separate species in 1801 from early colonial illustrations, first as the white-cheeked crow (Corvus olivaceus) and as the coachwhip flycatcher (Muscicapa crepitans). The bird became commonly known as coachwhip bird or stockwhip bird. John Gould recorded the aboriginal term Djou from the Hunter Region of New South Wales.

Its specific name is derived from its olive colouration, though it was soon placed in the new genus Psophodes by Nicholas Aylward Vigors and Thomas Horsfield, derived from the Greek psophōdes/ψοφωδης meaning 'noisy'. The family placement has changed, some now placing it in a large broadly defined inclusive Corvidae, while others split it and several other genera into the quail-thrush family Cinclosomatidae. Other research proposes that the quail-thrushes are themselves distinctive, leaving the whipbirds and wedgebills in a family with the proposed name Psophodidae. The name "Eupetidae" had been used for this grouping; however, because of the distant relationship of the rail-babbler to the other members of this group uncovered in research by Jønsson et al. (2007) that name is more appropriately used for the monotypic family which contains this species.

=== Subspecies ===
Two subspecies are recognized:

- P. o. olivaceus, the nominate subspecies, is found from eastern Victoria to southeastern Queensland.
- P. o. lateralis is found on the Atherton Tableland and is smaller and browner.
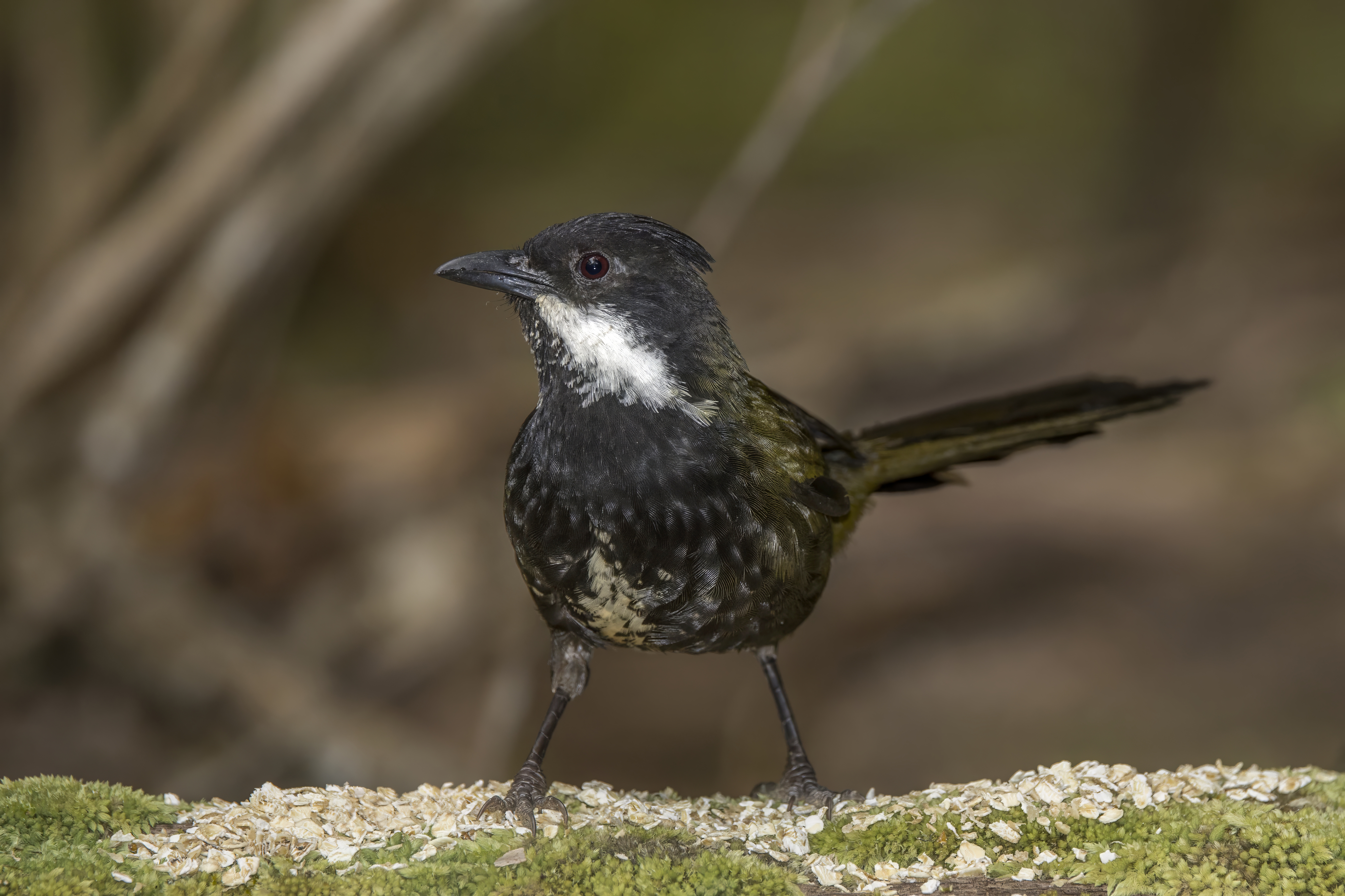
Adult P. o. lateralis

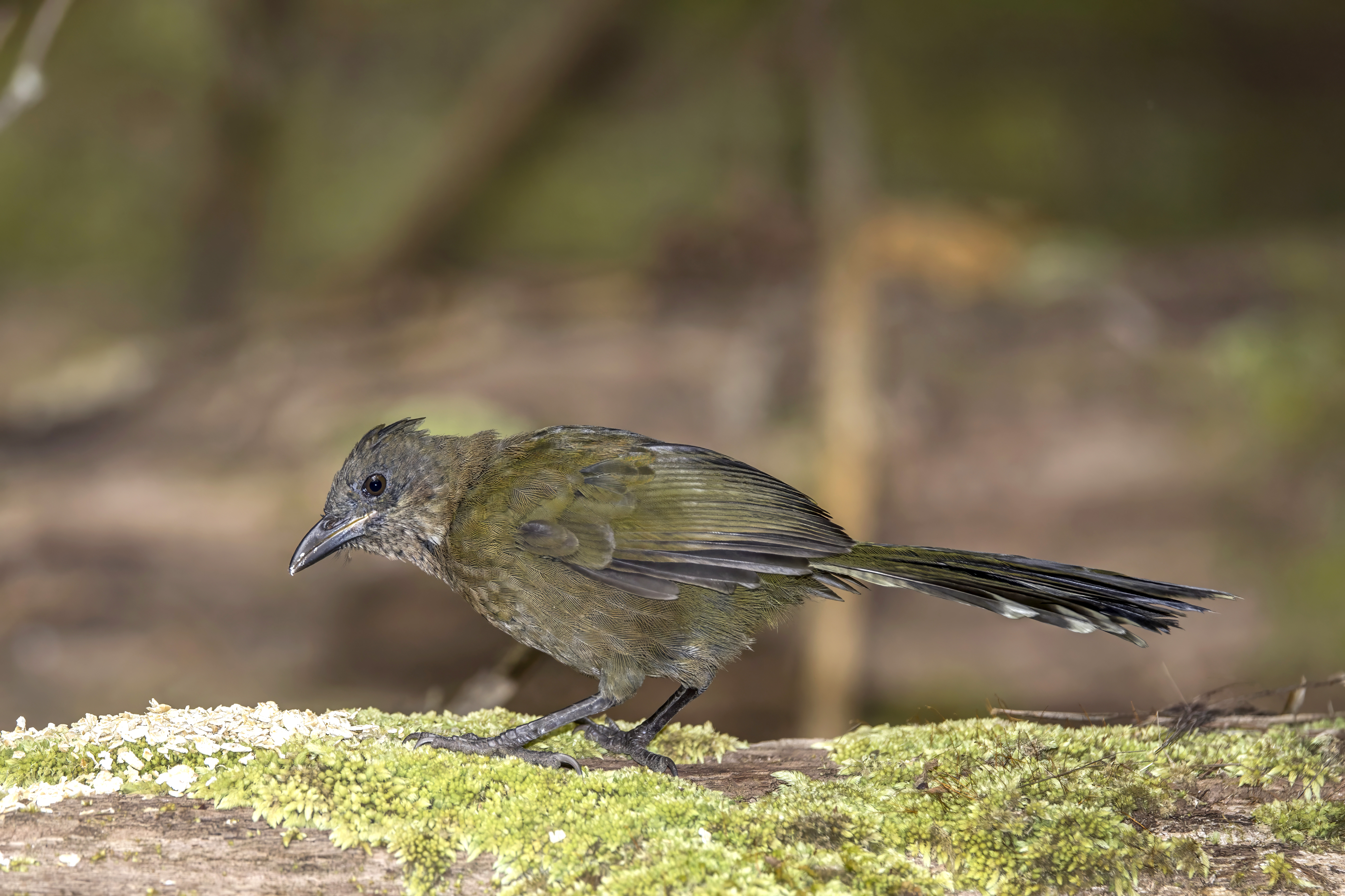
Juvenile P. o. lateralis

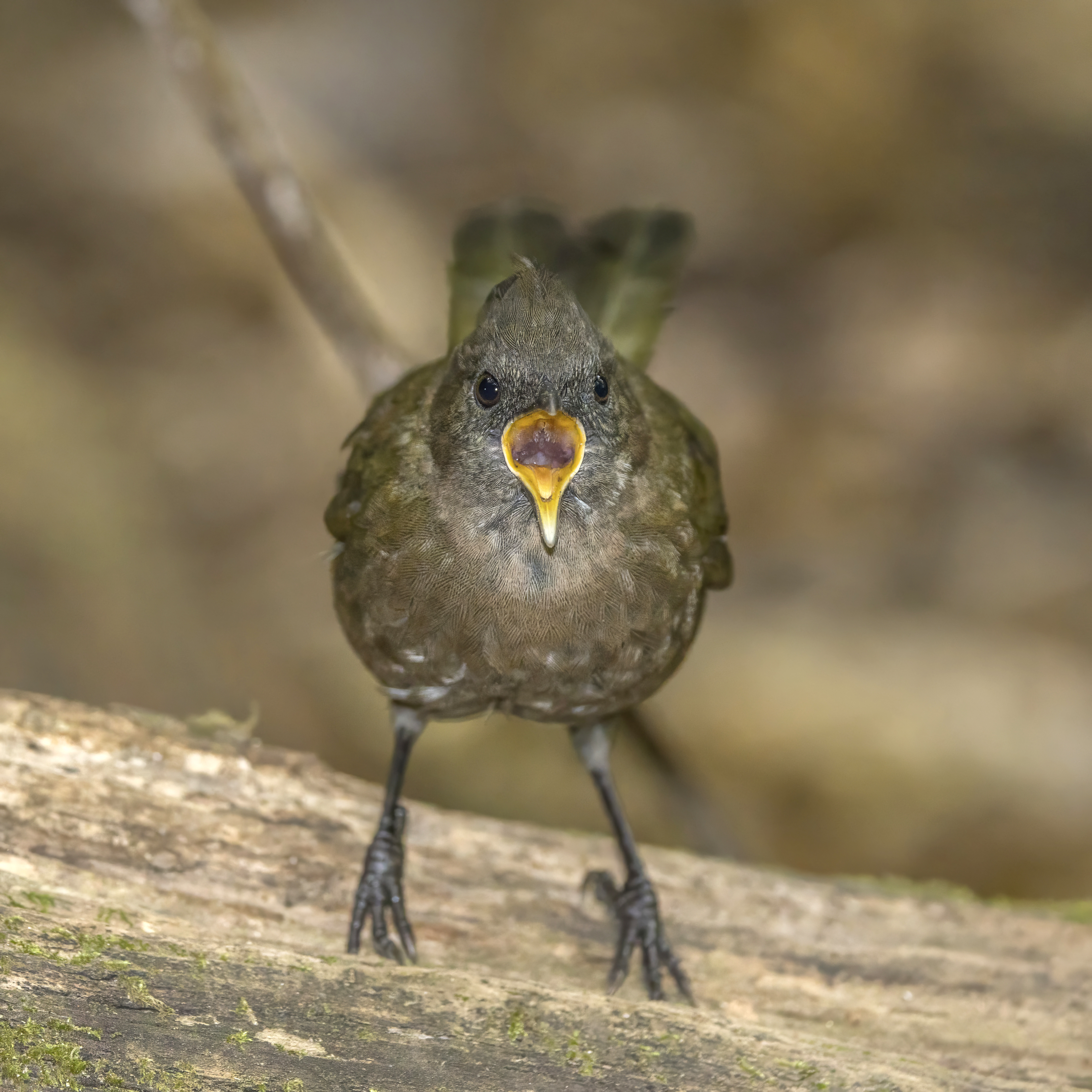
Juvenile P. o. lateralis

== Description ==
A slim bird some 26–30 cm (10–12 in) in length and 47–72 grams (1.7–2.5 oz) in weight, it is olive green with a black head and breast. It has a small black crest with a white cheek-patch on its face. It has a paler abdomen with a long dark olive-green tail tipped with white. The iris is brown and bill is black with blackish feet. The male is slightly larger than the female. Juveniles are a duller olive-brown and lack the white cheek stripes and dark throat.

The eastern whipbird is generally shy, and is heard much more often than seen. Its long drawn out call – a long note, followed by a 'whip crack' (which is the source of the common name) and some follow-on notes – is one of the most distinctive sounds of the eastern Australian bush. The call is usually a duet between the male and female, the male producing the long note and whip crack and female the following notes. Calls are most frequent in the early morning, though do occur through the day with small peaks at noon and sunset. Though male calls are consistent across the species range, a high degree of variation in female calls has been reported. The call samples have been used in many films such as: Bush Christmas (1983) and The Dark Crystal (1982).

== Distribution and habitat ==
The eastern whipbird is found in wet temperate forests including both rainforests and wet sclerophyll forests, generally near water. It occurs from eastern Victoria north through to central Queensland. A northern race, sometimes known as the northern whipbird (Psophodes olivaceus lateralis) is found in the wet tropics of North Queensland from Cooktown to Townsville. At least one study has found it to be a specialist species in terms of habitat and threatened by urbanisation.

== Behaviour ==
The eastern whipbird is insectivorous, recovering insects from leaf litter on the forest floor.

=== Breeding ===
Whipbirds are monogamous. Breeding occurs from late winter through spring; a loosely built bowl of twigs and sticks lined with softer material such as grasses, located in shrubs or trees less than 3–4 m (9.8–13.1 ft) above the ground. Several broods may occur in an extended breeding season. A clutch of two eggs, pale blue with blackish splotches and spots, measuring 28 x 20 mm, is laid. The female incubates the eggs and broods the nestlings, though the male helps feed and take a more active role in looking after fledglings for 6 weeks after leaving the nest.
