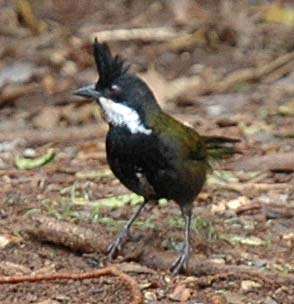
- Eastern whipbird (Psophodes olivaceus)

Scientific classification
- Kingdom: Animalia
- Phylum: Chordata
- Class: Aves
- Order: Passeriformes
- Family: Psophodidae
- Genus: Psophodes; Vigors & Horsfield, 1827

Type species
- Muscicapa crepitans Latham, 1801

= Psophodes =

Genus of birds

Whipbirds and wedgebills are collectively recognised in the genus Psophodes. Wedgebills are divided into the chirruping wedgebill (Psophodes cristatus) and the chiming wedgebill (Psophodes occidentalis). Whipbirds are divided into the eastern whipbird (Psophodes olivaceus) and the western whipbird (Psophodes nigrogularis). Subspecies of the western whipbird residing in Western Australia are known to be endangered. Psophodes is a genus of four species of songbirds endemic to Australia, known as whipbirds and wedgebills.

== Description ==
Psophodes are shy, medium-sized, insectivorous birds that live in the undergrowth. Characteristics of Psophodes include the presence of a crest and a heavy, laterally compressed bill. They have a long tail with strongly developed legs and feet as well as short rounded wings. Wedgebills have their sixth and seventh primary feathers as well as the bends in the edges of the wings in white. The[wedgebill has eight restrices on the outside tipped with white, while the whipbird has only six white tips. Their movements of both whipbirds and wedgebills in walking, bowing, and postures are almost identical.

The chirruping wedgebill and the chiming wedgebill are plain grey-brown in appearance with small crests. The two wedgebills are nearly undecipherable except for their vocalisations and song. In contrast, the whipbirds (eastern and western) whilst sharing many similarities with the wedgebills, are evidently different, especially in plumage. The majority are olive-green with white malar patches, as well as black throats or upper chests. The vocalisations of the western whipbird are very similar to the wedgebills, however, the eastern whipbird differs once again in vocalisation. The eastern whipbird's plumage is similar to that of the western whipbird, however, they have a far more conspicuous white malar patches and are a richer olive-green colour.

== Distribution and habitat ==
Psophodes are found in many areas of Australia. The chirruping wedgebill is located on the plains of central Australia, mainly among the Lachlan and Darling, however, they have been found on the lower Naomi. Currently, the chirruping wedgebill is found as far east as the Darling River near Louth (30°35’S, 145°05’E), Coronga Peak (30°45’S, 146°19’E), and Cobar (31°30’S, 145°50’E). There have been records of the chirruping wedgebill in Victoria near the southwestern border with New South Wales.

The eastern whipbird distribution is from the eastern side of Australia from northeastern Queensland to eastern New South Wales and Victoria. The western whipbird is found in coastal areas from Perth to Hopetoun and in mallee heath between Wongan Hills and Hopetoun. The bird also covers areas within the southwest of Australia and west of the sclerophyll forest. Records indicate the western whipbird is also found in Mt Gardner, Two People Bay, Mallee country, Banksia, stunted heath around Gnowangerup, and Borden.

The black-throated whipbird is found in coastal thickets and dense forest understorey vegetation. Their preferred habitat consists of two-layered formation 2–3 metres high with understoreys which are dense to mid-dense. The black-throated whipbird is known as the ‘rain bird’ as it seeks the summit of coastal areas preceding rain. The bird is difficult to find as it is a ground runner and it rarely leaves low shrub areas. It is observed that the eastern whipbird prefers tall moist forest and riparian areas, even though the upper layer is rarely used.

Common amongst all species of Psophodes, the surrounding flora has a ground layer of approximately 5 cm deep mainly made from sclerophyllous leaves. Between the species of Psophodes, there is a theme of preferences of structure over floristics. There is also a preference for broombush (Melaleuca uncinata) likely due to the rapid growth after fire, however, harvesting of this plant is a cause for concern for these birds. Areas such as open grassy understorey can equate to a lower quality habitat and therefore a smaller population of birds per hectare than densely shrub covered locations.

== Taxonomy ==
Members within the genus Psophodes are closely related to the quail thrushes within the Corvida family Cinclosomatidae. The eastern whipbird is known to be one of four species of Psophodes. Rogers and Mulder (2004) also suggest two subspecies of the eastern whipbird, the southern P. livaceus and the northern P. lateralis. These two subspecies have been identified based on their geographic location within Australia as well as their morphology and plumage.

Two subspecies of the black-throated whipbird include: Psophodes nigrogularis oberon and Psophodes nigrogularis nigrogularis.

The wedgebills have their own place in Psophodes. Ford and Parker (1972) note that the wedgebill consists of two species: the eastern and the western. The current species is known as Psophodes cristatus, however, the differences between the eastern and the western wedgebill are quite substantial. While morphologically similar, the contrast in their behaviour and vocalisations are quite large.

Phylogenetic research has found that the two whipbirds are not sister taxa. Toon, Joseph, and Burbidge's (2013) study found that the eastern whipbird shares a more recent ancestor with wedgebills than the western whipbird. The inclusion of the Papuan whipbirds (Androphobus) in the genus may see the western whipbird become the sister species to that group. Schodde and Mason (1999) recognised that there could be three lineages within Psophodes; the eastern whipbird, western whipbird and the wedgebills. This however, has not yet been confirmed.

Further conjecture has occurred through other DNA sequencing studies of birds. A recent study has found that the Psophodidae (whipbirds and quail thrushes) was polyphyletic, with Cinclosomatidae (quail thrushes) and Ptilorrhoa (jewel-babblers) comprising a lineage unrelated to Psophodes (whipbirds and wedgebills). This too has yet to be confirmed.

Passeriformes (order in which Psophodes is in) has been linked with DNA sequencing to Gondwana, the centre of origins for a myriad of avian orders. Australia has played an integral role in the diversification of many animals and plants throughout the years including Passeriformes (perching birds).

Specifically for the whipbird, the evolution has been described as a dry Epoch in the pan-austral population of ancestral whipbirds saw a split into the eastern and western ends of Australia. The following pluvial (rain) periods allowed the whipbirds on the western side to migrate east and take up areas near the Murray basin.

The Psophodes are said to have diverged from its main group approximately 13.8 mya. Similarly, the eastern whipbird has evolved highly divergent from the other species within Psophodes. With regards to vocalisations, the similarities between wedgebills and whipbirds reflects the ancestral link.

=== Species ===
The genus contains four species:

Image	Scientific name	Common name	Distribution
	Psophodes olivaceus	Eastern whipbird	east coast of Australia
	Psophodes nigrogularis	Western whipbird	southwest Australia
	Psophodes occidentalis	Chiming wedgebill	Australia
	Psophodes cristatus	Chirruping wedgebill	southeastern inland Australia

== Behaviour ==
Psophodes are known to be ‘monogamous’ and have low divorce rates. Within the monogamous relationship, both the male and female feed their young. Territories within Psophodes species are highly sought after with the males defending their territory for dominance. When males are locked in a territorial battle, it is known that the species of Psophodes match the ‘crack’ of the song and produce the ‘cracks’ in an overlapping style. Females normally do the same when competing for territory. This is usually done with the male present and both of them singing. The female would match the other female in their pitch and frequency. When a pair bond, both the male and female defend the territory through vocalisations.

=== Song ===
From what we know about the song of Psophodes, the different types of songs used are used for three major functions: (1) Maintenance of contact, (2) maintenance of a pair bond, and (3) territorial advertisement. The majority of birds’ song is at dawn as it is the best time for sound transmission in different environments.

Psophodes are known as duetters, meaning their songs are acoustically displayed and coordinated to produce precise, consistently timed, alternating or overlapping songs. The chiming wedgebill is not known to form pair duets. Furthermore, Rogers (2005) suggests that the duet function is associated with a convergence of sexual roles, such as territorial defense and courtship. Psophodes duets are perfectly timed making it sound as though the song is coming from an individual bird. In addition, Watson (1969) indicates that antiphonal song is linked to the monogamous bond between the birds and is an evolutionary adaptation to the environment.

Psophodes males sing a long drawn-out whistle with a sudden and explosive whip-like crack (giving them their name). The female usually responds with a ‘chew-chew’ simultaneously so the song sounds as one (antiphonal). Psophodes have different types of calls, some where the ‘crack’ frequency decreases, and some where the ‘crack’ frequency increases. The pattern of use between different calls is not well known, however, if a male is singing, they will usually switch between songs after several bouts of the same tune. The structure of the song within the eastern whipbird changes around 9 times depending on the pitch of the introductory whistle and the frequency and speed of the ‘crack’.

Song is used for many situations, such as specifying location. This would be done by using a complete cycle of their song (introduction whistle, and crack). In addition, song is used for territory purposes as well as mate locating. When males and females in a monogamous relationship feed, they would generally sing to give their locality to their partner indicating they were not far away from each other. In other situations, such as when the birds did not want to be located, they would commonly only sing the introductory whistle which is harder to pick the locality because of the lack of a changing pitch and frequency. The use of the whistle is used in situations such as when the bird is approaching their nest, or when feeding fledglings.

=== Food and feeding ===
Whipbirds and wedgebills generally feed on prey including insects (hexapoda) and spiders (Araneae). Methods used by these birds include gleaning (approximately 64%), probing and prizing (approximately 34%), and snatching (approximately 2%).

In an analysis of the eastern whipbird feeding environment, it is noted that most food is found on the ground (53%), however, bark branches (32%), tree trunks (6%), loose bark (6%), and foliage (3%) are additional food substrates. In addition to this research, the eastern whipbird has an average foraging height of 1.1m showing the bird does not feed very high off the ground.

Psophodes are known as predators to the endangered Caley's Grevillea tree (Grevillea caleyi). They eat this fruit by dropping it onto the ground, hitting the fruit with its bill and breaking it in pieces.

Psophodes are also known to eat sunflower seeds. Whilst eating these seeds, two eating positions are used including the ‘upright’ and ‘downward’ stance. The ‘upright’ stance consists of raising the tibia from the tarsus holding the body up and forward. The ‘downward’ stance includes dropping the knee and ankle joints so they are resting on the ground. The tip of the tail rests on the ground for further support. Psophodes do not seem to have a preference for left or right foot feeding (as consistent with other species of birds).

=== Breeding ===
Little is known about the reproductive success and breeding of Psophodes, which is unfortunately the same for the rest of the family Cinclosomatidae. It is known, however, that in the eastern whipbird, the female would produce clutches of two or occasionally three eggs. A feature that can be seen in other Psophodes; it is an evolutionary characteristic of endemic Australian Passerines. The reason for the low number of clutches is not well known, however, it has been put down to limited food availability, predation risk, and seasonal fluctuations in resources.

The breeding season for Psophodes is approximately 5–6 months and have an average incubation period of 20 days. Females are responsible for nest building and incubation. In order to accommodate for the low clutch sizes, Psophodes normally produces multiple clutches during the breeding season.

Nests are bowl shaped usually 95mm (average) deep and 131mm (average) in diameter. They are tightly made using sedges (A. scabra, Lepidosperma spp.) and Dasypogon bromelifolius on the outside and finer sedges, grasses, and twigs on the inside. Once fledged, the birds usually stay close to the nest as they cannot yet fly. The adults continue to feed their young for 2 months after their young have fledged.

== Threats ==
Much of the land in which Psophodes inhabit has been plagued by deforestation and fire as well as alterations in climate and agriculture. Fire and deforestation has occurred mostly in the wheat-belt of Australia since the 1920s. Today, most deforestation has ceased as agricultural land and cities are well established. Fires and climate, however, still pose a serious threat to the conservation of these birds as re-establishing territories can take between 3 and 14 years. As Psophodes are not migratory and are slow moving, fires can cause devastation as Psophodes have only been observed in approximately 50m flights. Smith also implies that Psophodes species living outside of reserves are not viable and may become extinct. Only birds living within reserves have a fair chance at survival.

Since the 1960s, there has been a decrease in the frequency of fires in the Western Australia area which has helped increase the population of birds. It is considered, that fire intervals of less than 10 years would drive the species to extinction. Given the phenomenon of climate change, fires in the area are set to increase and further harm the survival chances of Psophodes. Fire management strategies are useful for conservation, however, it is imperative that proper measures are taken into account for Psophodes protection when using these strategies.
