= Northern blue jewel-babbler =

Blue jewel-babbler

Conservation status
- Least Concern (IUCN 3.1)

Scientific classification
- Kingdom: Animalia
- Phylum: Chordata
- Class: Aves
- Order: Passeriformes
- Family: Cinclosomatidae
- Genus: Ptilorrhoa
- Species: P. caerulescens

Binomial name
- Ptilorrhoa caerulescens (Temminck, 1836)

Species of bird

The northern blue jewel-babbler (Ptilorrhoa caerulescens) is a species of bird in the family Cinclosomatidae, endemic to New Guinea. It was formerly considered to be conspecific with the southern blue jewel-babbler (Ptilorrhoa nigricrissus) and together they were known as the "blue jewel-babbler".

== Taxonomy ==
The northern blue jewel-babbler was formerly described and illustrated in 1836 by the Dutch zoologist Coenraad Jacob Temminck based on a specimen that had been collected by the German naturalists Heinrich Christian Macklot and Salomon Müller at Lobo in western New Guinea. Temminck coined the binomial name Eupetes caerulescens. The specific epithet is Latin meaning " bluish". The northern blue jewel-babbler is now placed in the genus Ptilorrhoa that was introduced in 1940 by James L. Peters.

Two subspecies are recognised:

- P. c. caerulescens (Temminck, 1836) – western New Guinea (Bird's Head Peninsula to Etna Bay), including Misool (Raja Ampat Islands, off western New Guinea)
- P. c. neumanni (Mayr & Meyer de Schauensee, 1939) – northern New Guinea (Mamberamo River to Astrolabe Bay)

In Wampar, spoken among the people who live in Markham Valley of New Guinea, it is referred to as the birisis. Its natural habitat is tropical moist lowland rainforests, typically primary rather than secondary forests. The call consists of a series of rapid notes at a constant pitch; it starts loud and gets progressively louder.
