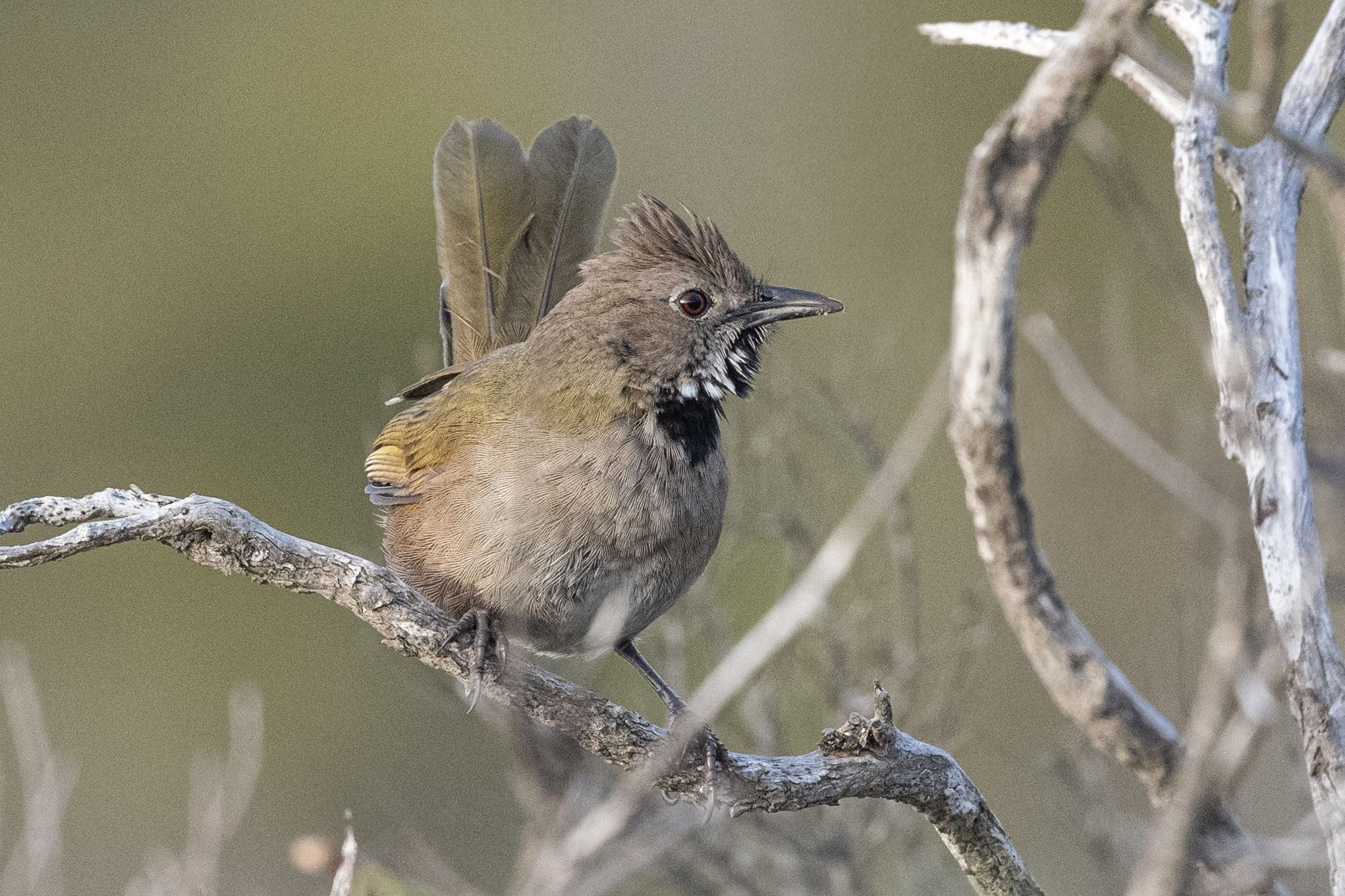

Conservation status
- Least Concern (IUCN 3.1)

Scientific classification
- Kingdom: Animalia
- Phylum: Chordata
- Class: Aves
- Order: Passeriformes
- Family: Psophodidae
- Genus: Psophodes
- Species: P. nigrogularis

Binomial name
- Psophodes nigrogularis Gould, 1844

= Western whipbird =

Black-throated whipbird

Species of bird

The western whipbird (Psophodes nigrogularis) is a passerine bird found in several scattered populations in Southwest Australia. It is predominantly olive green in colour. The western whipbird has sometimes been split into two species: the black-throated whipbird and the white-bellied whipbird.

== Taxonomy ==
The western whipbird was formally described in 1844 by the English ornithologist John Gould based on a specimen collected by John Gilbert in the Wongan Hills of Western Australia. Gould coined the current binomial name Psophodes nigrogularis. The specific epithet combines the Latin niger meaning "black" with Modern Latin gularis meaning "throated".

Four subspecies are recognised:

- P. n. nigrogularis Gould, 1844 – Two Peoples Bay, far southwest South Australia: (Endangered) The western heath subspecies is now restricted to a small patch east of Albany, having disappeared from large parts of its range due to land clearance.
- P. n. oberon Schodde & Mason, IJ, 1991 – southwest Western Australia, east of Two Peoples Bay: (Rare) The western mallee subspecies is found in scattered populations between the Stirling Ranges and Ravensthorpe. It is apparently common in the Fitzgerald River National Park.
- P. n. leucogaster Howe & Ross, JA, 1933 – coastal central south South Australia (white-bellied whipbird group)
- P. n. lashmari Schodde & Mason, IJ, 1991 – Kangaroo Island (off southeast South Australia) (white-bellied whipbird group)

The subspecies P. n. leucogaster and P. n. lashmari have been considered as a separate species, the white-bellied whipbird.

== Description ==
The western whipbird is a slim bird some 21–25 cm (8.3–9.8 in) in length. It is predominantly olive green with a black throat and a narrow white cheek-patch edged with black on its face. It has a small crest and a long dark olive-green tail tipped with white, its underparts are a paler olive colour. The bill is black with blackish feet. Juveniles are a duller olive-brown in colour and lack the white cheek stripes and dark throat.

== Breeding ==
Breeding occurs in spring. The nest is a bowl of twigs and sticks lined with softer material such as grasses, located in shrubs or trees less than 1–2 m (3–7 ft) above the ground. A clutch of two eggs, pale blue with blackish splotches and spots, measuring 26 mm × 19 mm (1.0 in × 0.7 in), is laid.

== Sources ==
- Garnett, S. (1993) Threatened and Extinct Birds Of Australia. Royal Australasian Ornithologists Union. National Library, Canberra. ISSN 0812-8014
