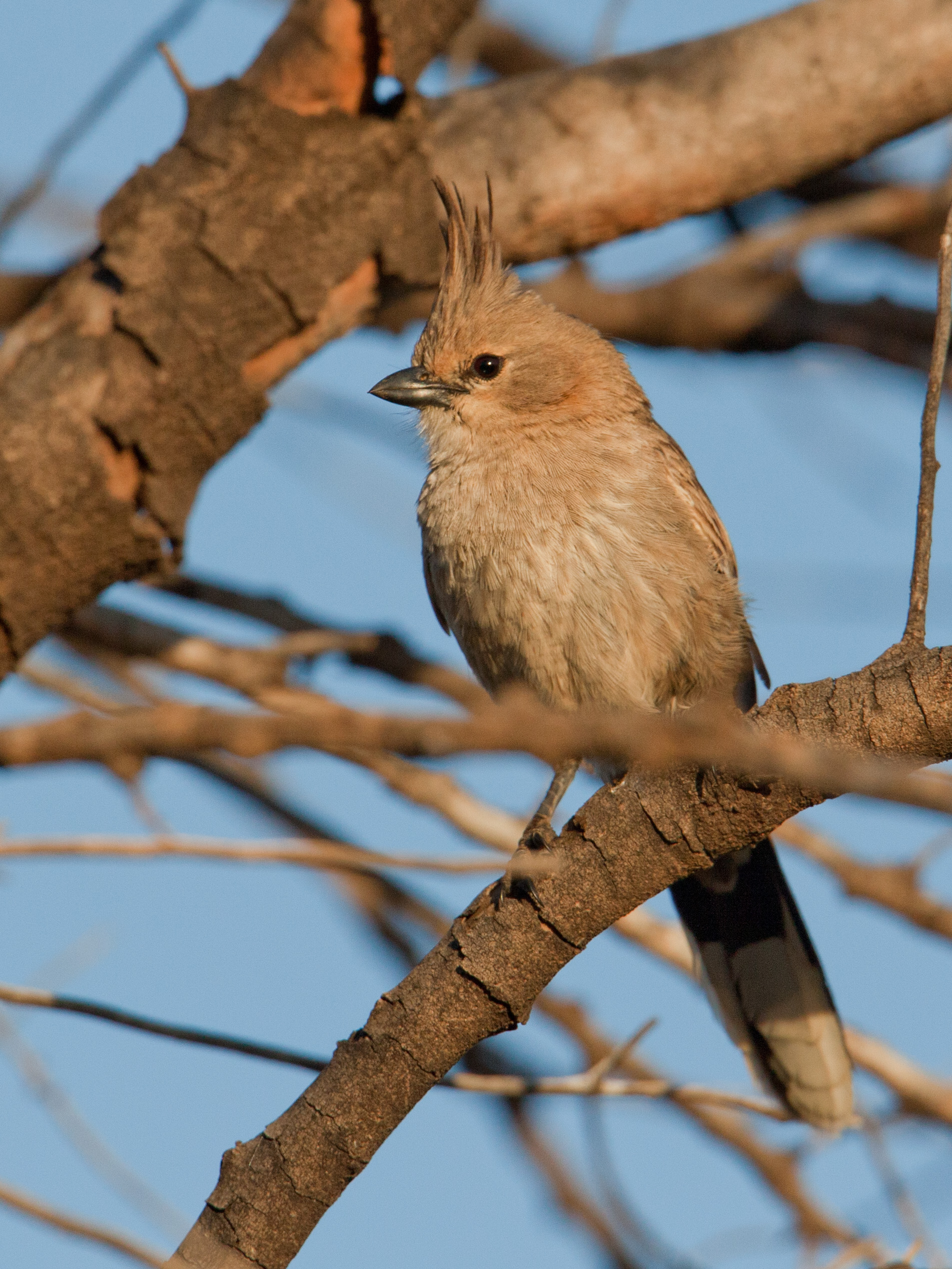

Conservation status
- Least Concern (IUCN 3.1)

Scientific classification
- Kingdom: Animalia
- Phylum: Chordata
- Class: Aves
- Order: Passeriformes
- Family: Psophodidae
- Genus: Psophodes
- Species: P. cristatus

Binomial name
- Psophodes cristatus (Gould, 1838)

= Chirruping wedgebill =

Species of bird

The chirruping wedgebill (Psophodes cristatus) is a medium-sized member of the genus Psophodes, which consists or four to five songbirds endemic to Australia. Commonly found in low shrublands in south-eastern inland Australia, the species is distinguished by its distinctive, chirruping call. The chirruping wedgebill and chiming wedgebill (Psophodes occidentalis) were considered to be a single species until as late as 1973, when they were separated due to marked differences in their calls.

== Taxonomy ==
John Gould originally described P. cristatus and P. occidentalis as one species (Sphenostoma cristatum), and this remained common practice until c. 1973. The separation of the species at that date was based mainly on differences in song and range.

== Description ==
The chirruping wedgebill is a medium-sized bird, measuring approximately 18–21 cm and weighing 31-64 g. Its bill is dark and wedge-shaped when mature, and horn-coloured when immature. It possesses a slim upright crest, and long rounded tail. Adult plumage consists of pale brown upperparts, with white/pale grey underparts. Flight feathers are edged with white, and the tail is coloured dark black-brown with a white tip. Immature individuals possess similar plumage, the only key differences being buff-tipped flight feathers, unlike the white tips of the mature individual.

This bird is often misidentified as the chiming wedgebill (Psophodes occidentalis). Key identifying features include the faint breast streaking, slightly longer tail, and repetitive chirruping call.

=== Call ===
The distinctive call of this species is described as an antiphonal duet. Accounts of the call differ slightly. Pizzey and Knight describe the male as calling sitzi-cheeri (similar to the budgerigar's rolling chirrup), while the female replies with an upward rolling r-e-e-e-t CHEER. The call is described by Simpson and Day, however, as "sparrow-like and repetitive". Male chirrrp, female response of ee cheer.

== Distribution and habitat ==
The chirruping wedgebill is found throughout south-eastern inland Australia, inhabiting low, open shrublands with acacia species. Distribution is patchy, but where found, the species is usually locally abundant. Though the species covers a large area, it is rarely found in the southern part of its range. It tends to favour areas with vegetation of bluebush, acacia stands, emu bush and lignum species.

== Ecology ==
The chirruping wedgebill is territorial throughout the year. Adults are generally sedentary, with small flocks of up to 20 birds being regularly recorded. Juvenile birds tend to be more widely dispersed, sometimes forming loose foraging flocks of up to 100 individuals, that wander over greater distances than the adults. The species is unobtrusive and reserved (though less shy than the chiming wedgebill), except when calling. While foraging, individuals make short flights (small flutters and glides) or run between cover. The species is non-migratory.

=== Diet ===
The chirruping wedgebill feeds predominantly by foraging for seeds and insects.

=== Breeding ===
The species has several breeding seasons throughout the year: from March to May, and August to November, as well as after rain. The nest consists of a loose, shallow cup of grass, twigs and bark (lined with smaller, fine material). It is generally built in the fork of a dense tree, shrub or mistletoe, generally no more than 3 metres above the ground. Two to three blue-green eggs with sparse dark blotches are laid at a time. The eggs are of a tapered-oval shape, measuring approximately 24 x 17 mm. Incubation length is unknown. The life span of this species is approximately 6.4 years. It is not known if the sexes possess different roles in food collection or parenting.

== Conservation ==
The chirruping wedgebill is classified as Least Concern by the IUCN.
