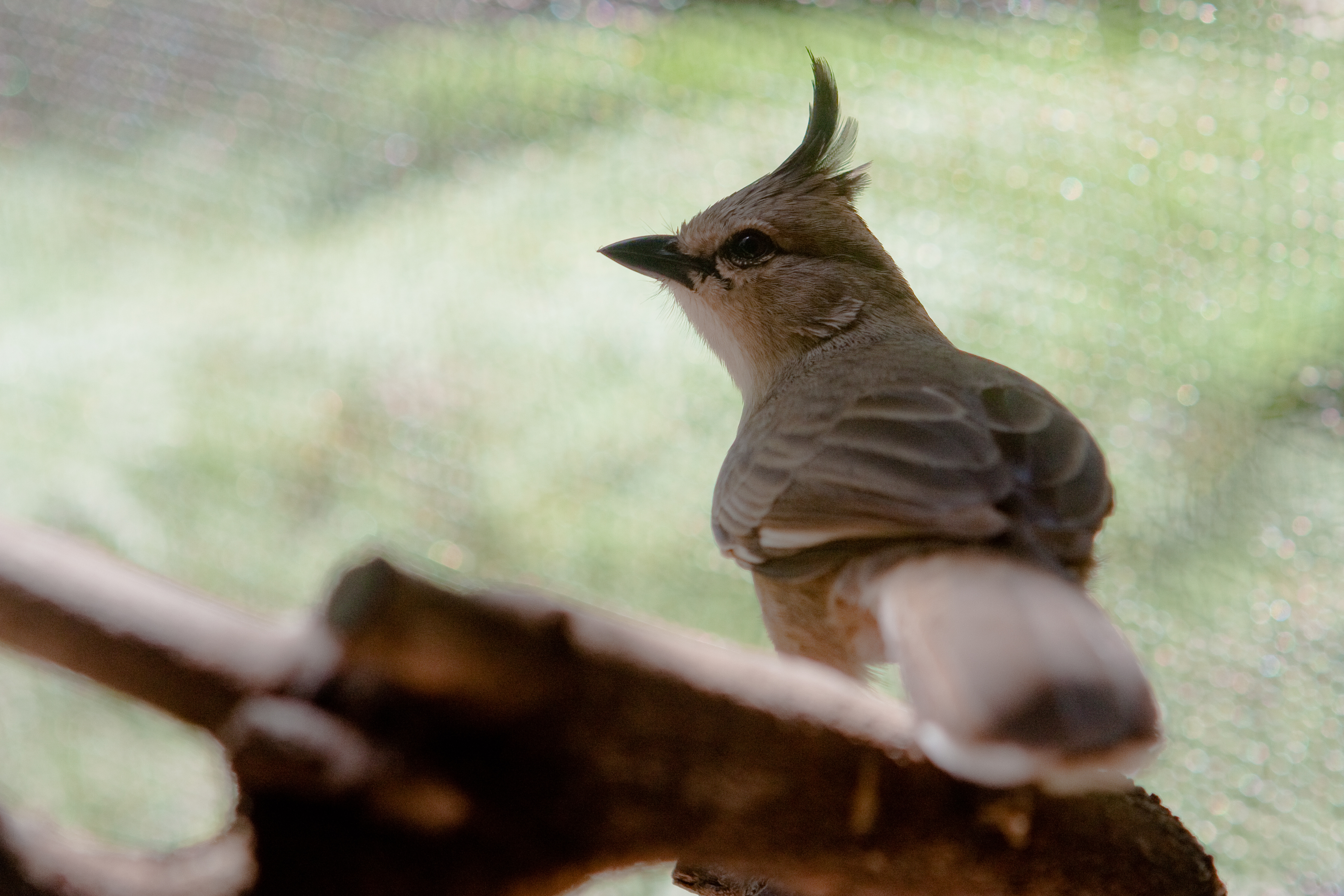

Conservation status
- Least Concern (IUCN 3.1)

Scientific classification
- Kingdom: Animalia
- Phylum: Chordata
- Class: Aves
- Order: Passeriformes
- Family: Psophodidae
- Genus: Psophodes
- Species: P. occidentalis

Binomial name
- Psophodes occidentalis (Mathews, 1912)

= Chiming wedgebill =

Species of bird

The chiming wedgebill (Psophodes occidentalis), sometimes referred to as chiming whipbird, is a species of bird in the family Psophodidae. It is endemic to Australia. The chiming wedgebill and chirruping wedgebill (Psophodes occidentalis) used to be considered one species until as late as 1973, when they were separated due to marked differences in their calls. Its sound consists of 4-6 descending notes sounding like loud chimes, and the final note is underlined and interpreted as "did-you-get-drunk" or "sweet-kitty-Lintorf". There is nothing documented about the female and male producing the same sound.

== Subspecies ==
The chiming wedgebill is a monotypic species.

== Description ==
The male chiming wedgebill weighs 38-45 grams and the female chiming wedgebill weighs 30-36 grams. The chest is forward-curving and the entire upper body is dark gray-brown, with the wings being a darker color. The tail is also dark gray-brown, but the tip of the tail is black. The tail contains a central pair of feathers with white tips. The chin, throat, and the center of the belly are grayish-white, and the belly and breast side are gray-brown ("little contrast with upperparts"). The undertail cover is brown, the iris is dark brown, the bill is black, and the legs are dark gray. Both the female and the male are similar in appearance. The young ones are similar in appearance to the adults but they are a little bit lighter in color "with plumage fluffier, secondaries and upper wing-coverts edged with light cinnamon, bill pale; immature also like an adult, but bill horn-brown, edges of secondaries and wing-coverts paler".

== Habitat ==
The chiming wedgebill can be found in the western and northern parts of Australia and stretches as far as the western side of Queensland and to the northwest and south of Australia. This bird is not documented to do migrations and tends to stick around the drier areas and move through local regions.

== Threat to species ==
The chiming wedgebill species is not considered "Vulnerable" because its range is very large, and even though its population is getting smaller, the decline isn't fast enough to meet the criteria for being at risk. The habitat it lives in may be changing, but not drastically enough to qualify it as vulnerable. Even though the exact size of the population isn't known, it's large enough to not worry about extinction. Essentially, the species' range, population decline, and size are not extreme enough to be labeled as endangered or vulnerable.

== Diet ==
There is nothing documented about the chiming wedgebill’s diet except that it eats insects, and seeds from the ground.
