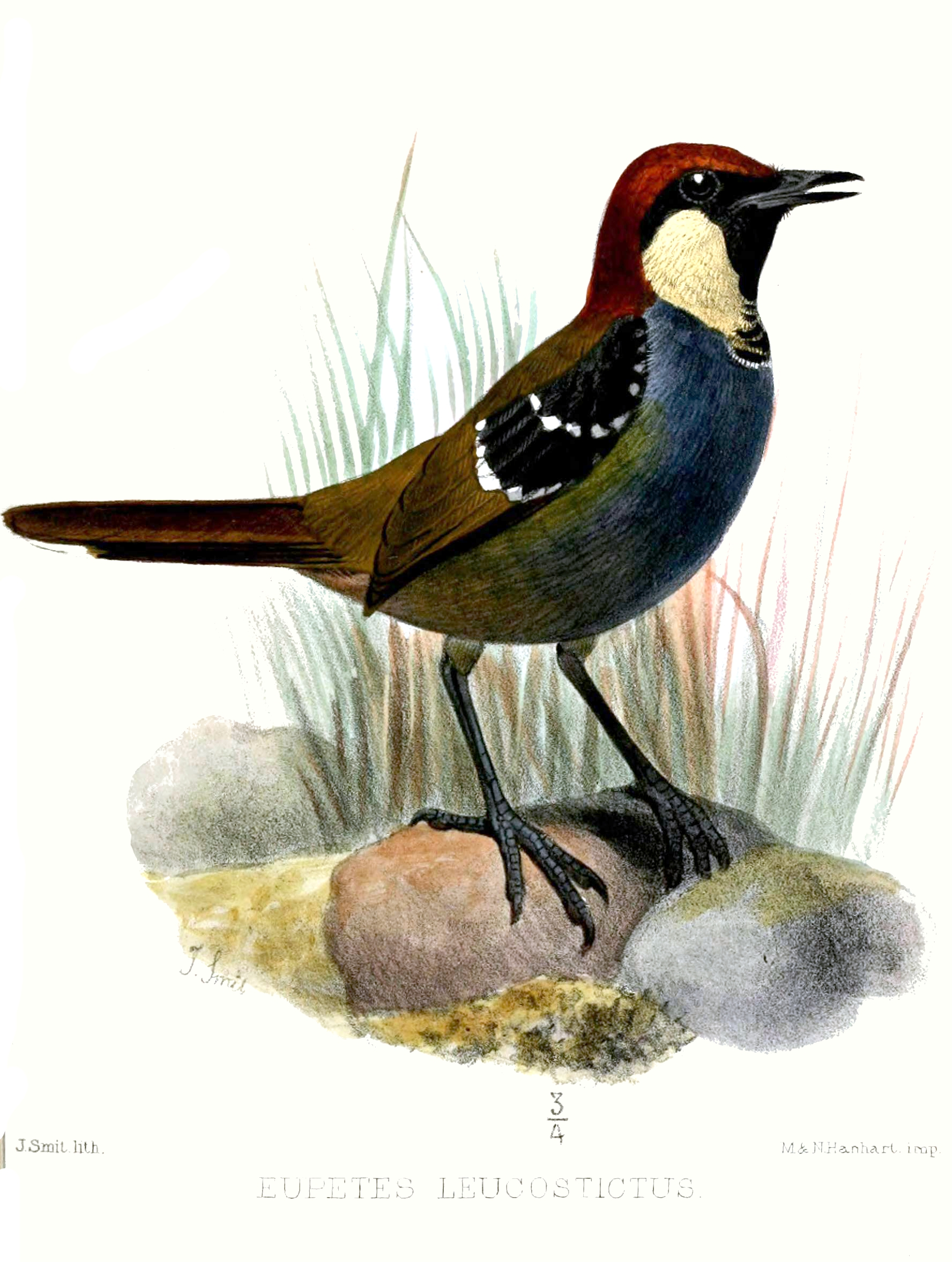
- Spotted jewel-babbler (Ptilorrhoa leucosticta)

Scientific classification
- Kingdom: Animalia
- Phylum: Chordata
- Class: Aves
- Order: Passeriformes
- Family: Cinclosomatidae
- Genus: Ptilorrhoa; J.L. Peters, 1940

Type species
- Eupetes caerulescens Temminck, 1836
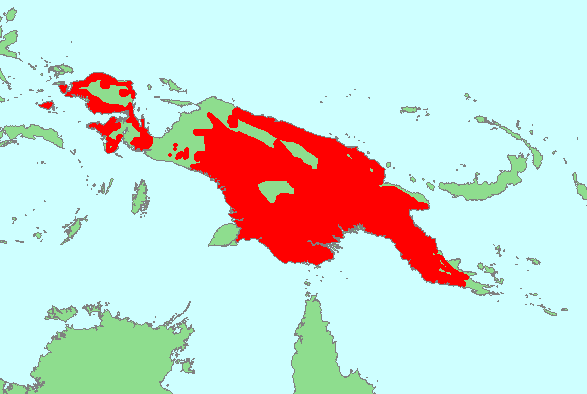
- Global range (In red)

= Jewel-babbler =

Jewel-babblers

Genus of birds

The jewel-babblers are members of the bird genus Ptilorrhoa in the family Cinclosomatidae. The genus contains five species that are endemic to New Guinea. The genus was once considered to contain the rail-babbler, but that species is now considered to belong to its own family. The genus is closely related to the better known quail-thrushes (Cinclosoma) of New Guinea and Australia. Together with a number of other genera they comprise the family Cinclosomatidae, although the validity of this family as a whole has been questioned.

The jewel-babblers resemble the quail-thrushes in shape, being plump, long-tailed and short winged. They are adapted to life on the forest floor. The plumage of this genus is the most striking divergence from the quail-thrushes, having large amounts of blue and often with chestnut on the back. The throats of all species are white and the patch is mostly surrounded by a black edge. There is moderate levels of sexual dimorphism in the plumage, except in the brown-headed jewel-babbler where the female has no blue and is all chestnut coloured. When moving they hold the body horizontally to the ground, and bob their heads back and forth in a similar fashion to pigeons, and move their tail in a fashion similar to wagtails.

The jewel-babblers as a whole are not a well-known or well-studied genus.

The genus Ptilorrhoa contains the following six species:

Image	Common name	Scientific name	Distribution
	Northern blue jewel-babbler	Ptilorrhoa caerulescens	subtropical or tropical moist montane forests, New Guinea
	Brown-headed jewel-babbler	Ptilorrhoa geislerorum	New Guinea
	Chestnut-backed jewel-babbler	Ptilorrhoa castanonota	subtropical or tropical moist lowland forests, New Guinea
	Southern blue jewel-babbler	Ptilorrhoa nigricrissus	subtropical or tropical moist lowland forests, New Guinea
	Hooded jewel-babbler	Ptilorrhoa urrissia	Lower montane forest, Papua New Guinea
	Spotted jewel-babbler	Ptilorrhoa leucosticta	Highland forest, New Guinea
