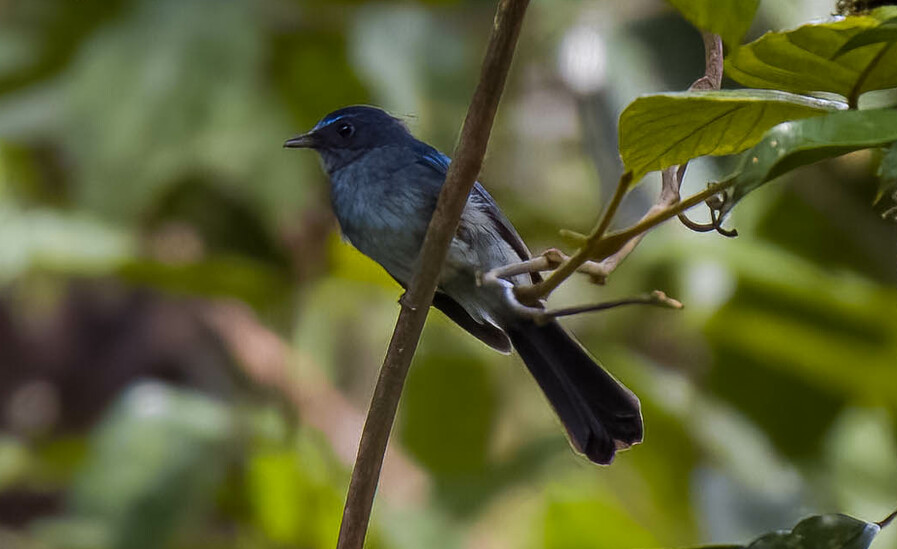

Conservation status
- Least Concern (IUCN 3.1)

Scientific classification
- Kingdom: Animalia
- Phylum: Chordata
- Class: Aves
- Order: Passeriformes
- Family: Rhipiduridae
- Genus: Rhipidura
- Species: R. samarensis

Binomial name
- Rhipidura samarensis (Steere, 1890)

= Visayan blue fantail =

Species of bird

The Visayan blue fantail (Rhipidura samarensis) is a species of bird in the family Rhipiduridae. It is endemic to the Philippines on the islands of Bohol, Leyte and Samar. Its natural habitat is tropical moist lowland forests. It was previously conspecific with the Mindanao blue fantail.

== Description and taxonomy ==
It was previous conspecific with the Mindanao blue fantail and is differentiated by its darker crown, lighter blue wing fringes and tail, a slower paced call and through molecular studies.

This species is monotypic and has no subspecies.

== Ecology and behavior ==
The diet of the Mindanao blue fantail consists of insects. It is often observed in mixed flocks with other birds such as Rufous paradise flycatcher, Black-naped monarch, Celestial monarch, Philippine leaf warbler, Short-crested monarch, Yellow-bellied whistler, Visayan babbler and Visayan pygmy babbler.

Breeding has been recorded from February to August. Nests in low bushes. Not much else information on breeding habits.

== Habitat and conservation status ==
It is found in tropical moist lowland forest up to 1,200 meters above sea level,

IUCN has assessed this bird as least-concern species. Occurs in a few protected areas like Rajah Sikatuna Protected Landscape in Bohol and Samar Island Natural Park but actual protection and enforcement from illegal logging and hunting are lax.
