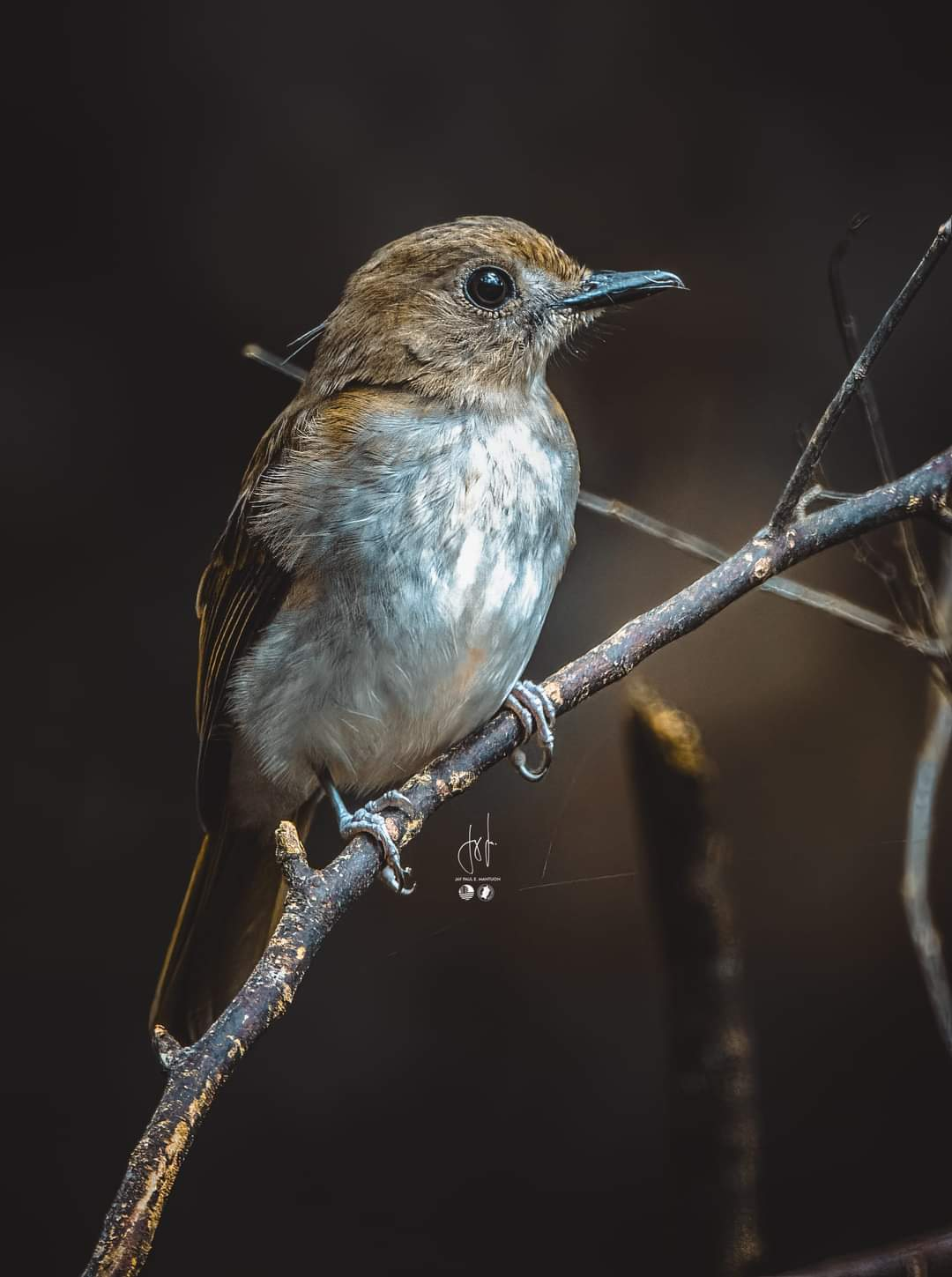
- ssp. zamboanga

Conservation status
- Least Concern (IUCN 3.1)

Scientific classification
- Kingdom: Animalia
- Phylum: Chordata
- Class: Aves
- Order: Passeriformes
- Family: Muscicapidae
- Genus: Cyornis
- Species: C. ruficauda

Binomial name
- Cyornis ruficauda (Sharpe, 1877)

Synonyms
- Rhinomyias ruficauda

= Philippine jungle flycatcher =

Species of bird

The Philippine jungle flycatcher (Cyornis ruficauda) is a species of passerine bird in the Old World flycatcher family Muscicapidae. It is endemic to the Philippines. Its natural habitat is tropical moist lowland forests up to 1,000 meters above sea level.

== Description and taxonomy ==
This species was previously placed in the genus Rhinomyias but was moved to Cyornis based on the results of a 2010 molecular phylogenetic study. The Sulu jungle flycatcher (C. ocularis), which is endemic to the Sulu Archipelago, and the Crocker jungle flycatcher (C. ruficrissa), which is endemic to Borneo, were split as distinct species by the IOC in 2021. With the split, this species was renamed from rufous-tailed jungle flycatcher to Philippine jungle flycatcher.

=== Subspecies ===
Four subspecies are recognized:

- C.r. ruficauda – Found on Basilan
- C.r. zamboanga – Found on Zamboanga Peninsula
- C.r. montanus – Found on Bohol,
- C.r. samarensis – Found on Mindanao (excluding Zamboanga), Leyte Biliran and Samar;

Diet is not well known but pressumed to consist of insects. Usually solitary but also observed in mixed-species flocks. Typically forages close to the forest floor and understorey.

== Habitat and conservation status ==
It is found in tropical moist lowland forestup to 1,000 meters above sea level

IUCN has assessed this bird as least-concern species but populations are decreasing due to deforestation.

Occurs in a few protected areas like Pasonanca Natural Park, Mount Apo and Mount Kitanglad on Mindanao, Rajah Sikatuna Protected Landscape in Bohol and Samar Island Natural Park but actual protection and enforcement from illegal logging and hunting are lax
