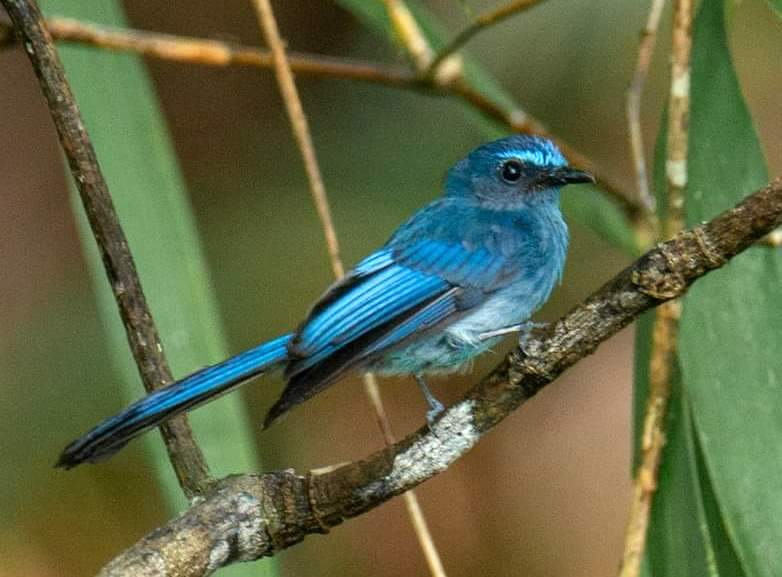
- ssp. superciliaris

Conservation status
- Least Concern (IUCN 3.1)

Scientific classification
- Kingdom: Animalia
- Phylum: Chordata
- Class: Aves
- Order: Passeriformes
- Family: Rhipiduridae
- Genus: Rhipidura
- Species: R. superciliaris

Binomial name
- Rhipidura superciliaris (Sharpe, 1877)

= Mindanao blue fantail =

Species of bird

The Mindanao blue fantail (Rhipidura superciliaris) is a species of bird in the family Rhipiduridae. It is one of 47 species in the genus Rhipidura. It is endemic to the Philippines found only on the island of Mindanao and Basilan. Its natural habitat is tropical moist lowland forests. It was previously conspecific with the Visayan blue fantail.

== Description and taxonomy ==
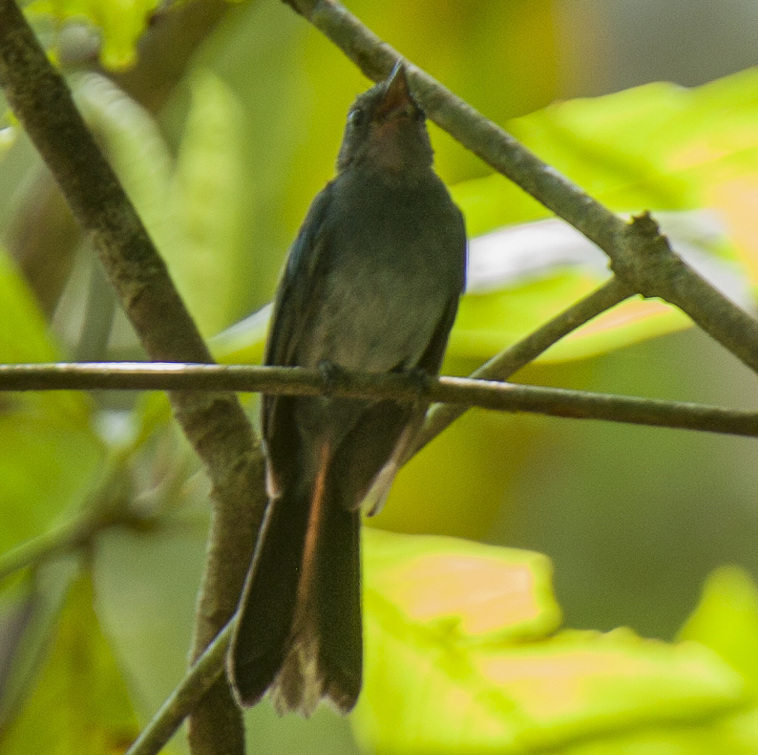
ssp. apo

EBird describes it as "A fairly small, long-tailed bird of lowland and foothill forest on Mindanao and Basilan. Overall dull blue in color with a paler belly. Often pumps tail up and down. Forages in the understory for insects and often joins mixed-species flocks. Similar in size and shape to celestial, short-crested, and black-naped monarchs, but Mindanao blue fantail is darker blue with a contrasting pale blue brow, tail, and wing patch. Song consists of a slightly ascending series of medium-pitched, upslurred whistled notes, increasing in volume. Also gives a sharp "wik!"

It was previous deemed conspecific with the Visayan blue fantail and is differentiated by its lighter crown, darker blue wing fringes and tail, a faster paced call and through molecular studies.

=== Subspecies ===
Two subspecies are recognized:

- R.s superciliaris – Found on Mindanao excluding Zamboanga Peninsula
- R.s. apo – Found on Zamboanga Peninsula and Basilan

Diet is not well known but pressumed to consist of insects. Usually observed in mixed-species flocks where it forages in the understorey.

== Ecology and behavior ==
The diet of the Mindanao blue fantail consists of insects. It is often observed in mixed flocks with other birds such as rufous paradise flycatcher, black-naped monarch, celestial monarch, Philippine leaf warbler, short-crested monarch, yellow-bellied whistler, rusty-crowned babbler and Mindanao pygmy babbler.

Breeding has been recorded from April to August. Nests in low bushes, but not much else is known about its breeding habits.

== Habitat and conservation status ==
It is found in tropical moist lowland forest up to 1,200 meters above sea level.

IUCN has assessed this bird as a least-concern species. It occurs in a few protected areas like Pasonanca Natural Park, Mount Apo and Mount Kitanglad, but actual protection and enforcement from illegal logging and hunting are lax.
