= Blue fantail =

The blue fantail has been split into two species:

- Mindanao blue fantail, Rhipidura superciliaris
- Visayan blue fantail, Rhipidura samarensis
