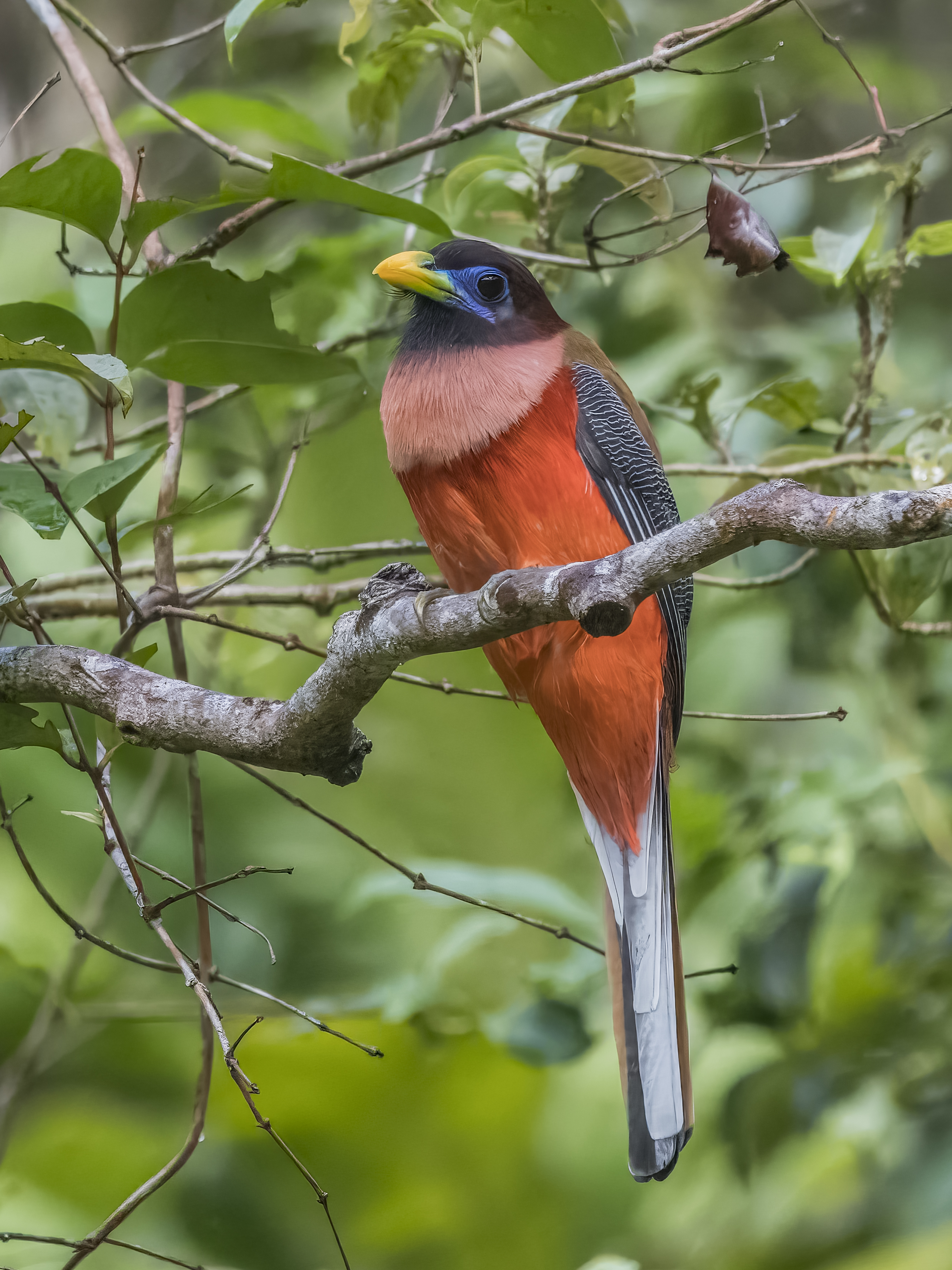
- Male H. a. linae, Bohol
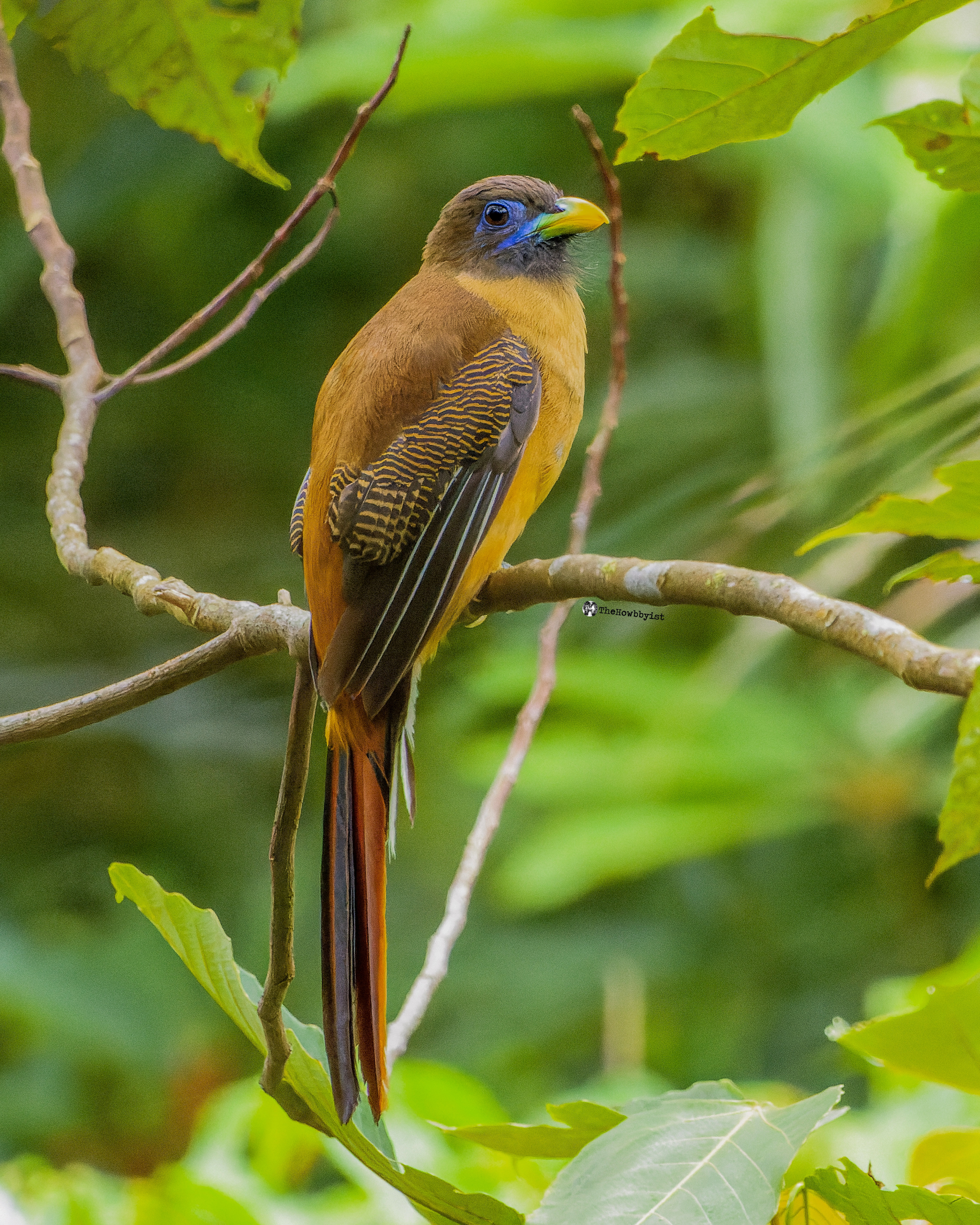
- Female H. a. luzoniensis, Quezon

Conservation status
- Least Concern (IUCN 3.1)

Scientific classification
- Kingdom: Animalia
- Phylum: Chordata
- Class: Aves
- Order: Trogoniformes
- Family: Trogonidae
- Genus: Harpactes
- Species: H. ardens

Binomial name
- Harpactes ardens (Temminck, 1826)

= Philippine trogon =

Species of bird

The Philippine trogon (Harpactes ardens) is a species of bird in the family Trogonidae. It is endemic to the Philippines found on regions of Luzon, Eastern Visayas, and Mindanao. It is the only species of trogon in the country. While not a threatened species, its population is declining due to habitat loss and hunting.

== Description and taxonomy ==
Its Latin name ardens translates to burning, flaming, glowing, fiery which is likely in reference to its bright colors.

=== Subspecies ===
Five subspecies are recognised:

- H. a. ardens – Found in Mindanao, Dinagat, and Basilan
- H. a. linae – Found in Samar, Biliran, Leyte, and Bohol; has a larger throat patch and bill
- H. a.. minor – Found in Polillo Islands; smaller with darker red colors
- H. a. luzoniensis – Found in Luzon (except Northeast), Marinduque and Catanduanes; shorter bill and duller underparts with no maroon hues on crown
- H. a. herberti – Found in Northeast Luzon; strong maroon hues on crown and a larger bill

== Ecology and behavior ==
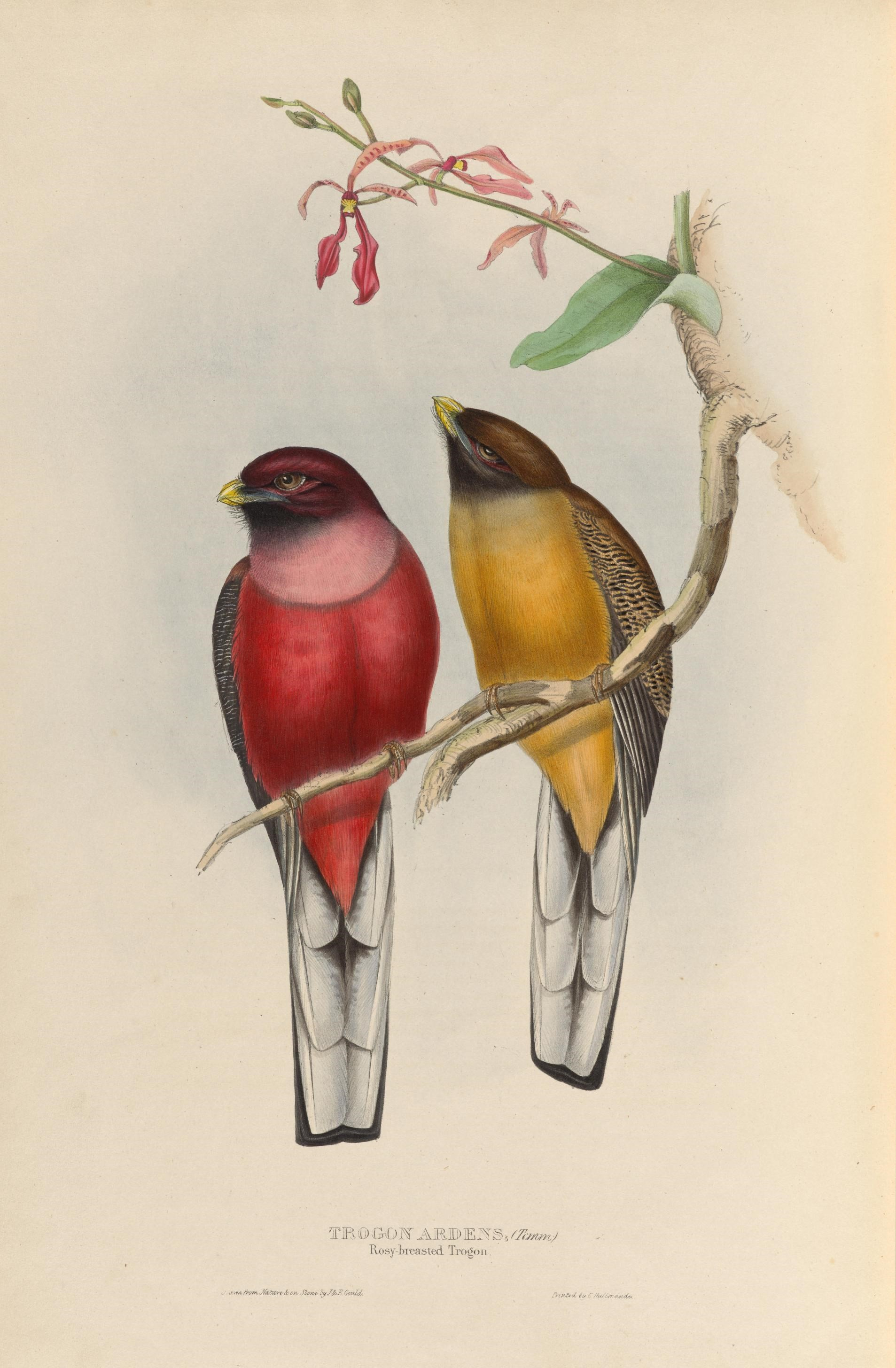
A monograph of a male and female Philippine trogon by John Gould

It is primarily an insectivore that feeds on grasshoppers, stick insects, praying mantises and other insects. It has also been recorded feeding on a small lizards and amphibians.

Breeding season is from March to June. Nest in tree holes above 5 meters from the forest floor. Its clutch size is 3 eggs. Interestingly, only males have been observed incubating but it is presumed that the females also participate.

== Habitat and conservation status ==
It is found in tropical moist lowland forest and the lower reaches of tropical moist mountain forest up to 2,000 meters above sea level but is most common under 600 meters above sea level.

The International Union for Conservation of Nature has assessed this bird as a Least-concern species as it has a large range and is still locally common in some areas. However, despite not being a threatened species, the population is believed to be on the decline. This species' main threat is habitat loss with wholesale clearance of forest habitats as a result of logging, agricultural conversion and mining activities occurring within the range.

Occurs in a many protected areas in Bataan National Park, Bulusan Volcano Natural Park, Angat Watershed Forest Reserve, Northern Sierra Madre Natural Park on Luzon, Pasonanca Natural Park, Mount Kitanglad, Mount Apo on Mindanao; Rajah Sikatuna Protected Landscape in Bohol; and Samar Island Natural Park in Samar. While all of these areas are protected by law, deforestation, mining, hunting and habitat loss still continue in some of these protected areas.

== Relationship with humans ==
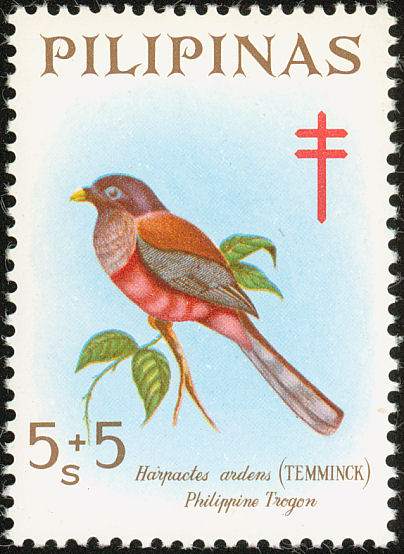
Featured in a 1969 stamp to fight tuberculosis.

Among Philippine endemics, this bird is relatively well known by the public as it is often featured in stamps, murals, artworks, stuffed toys, brands and viral news articles.

Primarily due to its plumage and colors, the bird has been associated with the mythical Ibong Adarna from Filipino epic poem of the same name. However, there is no actual and historical basis for this and based on the descriptions of the mythical bird, it is more akin to the mythical Phoenix or Sarimanok rather than any actual bird. Also, unlike the Ibong Adarna's musical lullaby-like call in the epic, the Philippine trogon's voice is often compared to a laughing horse's neighing This bird is often featured on viral news articles and posts which directly link it to the Ibong Adarna, while the state news outlet Philippine News Agency has erroneously referred to this bird as "critically endangered".

The Philippine trogon has been featured twice on Philippine stamps in 1969 and 1992 respectively.

Despite its attractive plumage, this species is rarely kept in captivity as they do not survive, partly due to their specialized insectivorous diet. There are no records of Philippine trogons in zoos.
