= Mount Pulong Bato =

Mountain in the Philippines

Mount Pulong Bato (Columbato)
- Mount Pulumbato, "Mt. Columbato"
- Location within the Zamboanga Peninsula

Highest point
- Elevation: 360 m (1,180 ft)
- Coordinates: 6°58′22″N 122°04′22″E

Geography
- Location within Philippines
- Location: Mindanao
- Country: Philippines
- Region: Zamboanga Peninsula
- City: Zamboanga City
- Parent range: Zamboanga Cordillera

Geology
- Rock age: Early to Middle Miocene
- Mountain type: Monolith
- Volcanic arc: Zamboanga-Sulu Arc
- Last eruption: Unknown

Mount Pulong Bato (Columbato) is a monolith located in Zamboanga City at the Zamboanga Peninsula, the western tip of the island of Mindanao in the Philippines. The mountain is situated in the Upper Abong-Abong Park within the Pasonanca Natural Park, in Barangay Pasonanca, only a few kilometers away from the city's downtown section.

== Geology ==
Mount Pulong Bato became infamous because when the Philippine Institute of Volcanology and Seismology (PHIVOLCS) confirmed the mountain is a volcano which is unknown to most people. What is unusual about the mountain is, unlike the other mountains surrounding the city, only Mount Columbato is made from solid rock.

According to PHIVOLCS, the volcano is an Intrusion type of volcano meaning it was formed within Earth's crust. Magma was pushed from the beneath the Earth surface but did not come out through an eruption like a typical volcano (Extrusion). The magma eventually solidified while it is still enclosed by softer rocks, which was later exposed by erosion or weathering, a process that could take thousands of years.

== Holy Week observance ==
The mountain is near the premises of the famous Abong-Abong Park, where both domestic and foreign Catholic devotees pilgrimage annually during Holy Week to observe the holiday and meditate.

== Background: from Columbato to Pulong bato ==
The correct name of the mountain is Columbato. The name columbato is from the Tagalog words "Kolum"(column) and bato(stone or rock). The chavacanos spelled the word "kolum" as "colum" but kept the "bato" as is.

The name "pulong bato" only started in the 1980s when the popular mayor of Zamboanga City (Cesar C. Climaco) created the station of the cross in abong-abong beside the mountain of Columbato. It became a very popular place and Christians would congregate and "meet" there during holy week. In Tagalog the word for meeting is "PULONG". That's when they started referring to the place as "Pulong bato".
