= Sulu jungle flycatcher =

Scientific classification
- Kingdom: Animalia
- Phylum: Chordata
- Class: Aves
- Order: Passeriformes
- Family: Muscicapidae
- Genus: Cyornis
- Species: C. ocularis

Binomial name
- Cyornis ocularis (Bourns & Worcester, 1894)

Species of bird

The Sulu jungle flycatcher (Cyornis ocularis) is a species of passerine bird in the Old World flycatcher family Muscicapidae. It is endemic to the Sulu Archipelago. Its natural habitat is tropical moist montane forests. While it has yet to be assessed by the International Union for Conservation of Nature, this species is likely threatened by habitat loss.

The Sulu jungle flycatcher was split from the rufous-tailed jungle flycatcher (Cyornis rufocauda) as distinct species by the IOC in 2021.

It was listed by the Search For Lost Birds as the last photographic evidence of this species was in 1998. Claims of sightings continued in. Notably, Philippines Biodiversity Conservation Foundation, Inc. (PhilBio) claimed to have mistnetted an individual in 2020 but did not take any photos or any documentation. This species was finally found and photographed in 2026 and posted on EBird

== Description and taxonomy ==
This bird is differentiated from its sister species as it has a prominent rufous eyering, light brown upper mandible and paler brown lower mandible, and pinkish legs.

This species was previously placed in the genus Rhinomyias but was moved to Cyornis based on the results of a 2010 molecular phylogenetic study. The Sulu jungle flycatcher (C. ocularis), which is endemic to the Sulu Archipelago, and the Crocker jungle flycatcher (C. ruficrissa), which is endemic to Borneo, were split as distinct species by the IOC in 2021. With the split, this species was renamed from rufous-tailed jungle flycatcher to Philippine jungle flycatcher.

== Ecology and behavior ==
Diet is not well known but pressumed to consist of insects. Usually solitary but also observed in mixed-species flocks. Typically forages close to the forest floor and understorey.

Nothing is known about its breeding habits.

== Habitat and conservation status ==
It is found in tropical moist lowland forest.

IUCN has yet to assess this bird as it does not yet recognize it as a separate species. All other birds endemic to the Sulu Archipelago are endangered species due to the deforestation that has occurred in the past decades. Due to this, as this species is also forest dependent, it is highly likely that it is threatened.
