= Rufous-tailed jungle flycatcher =

Rufous-tailed jungle flycatcher has been split into the following species:

- Philippine jungle flycatcher, Cyornis ruficauda
- Sulu jungle flycatcher, Cyornis ocularis
- Crocker jungle flycatcher, Cyornis ruficrissa
