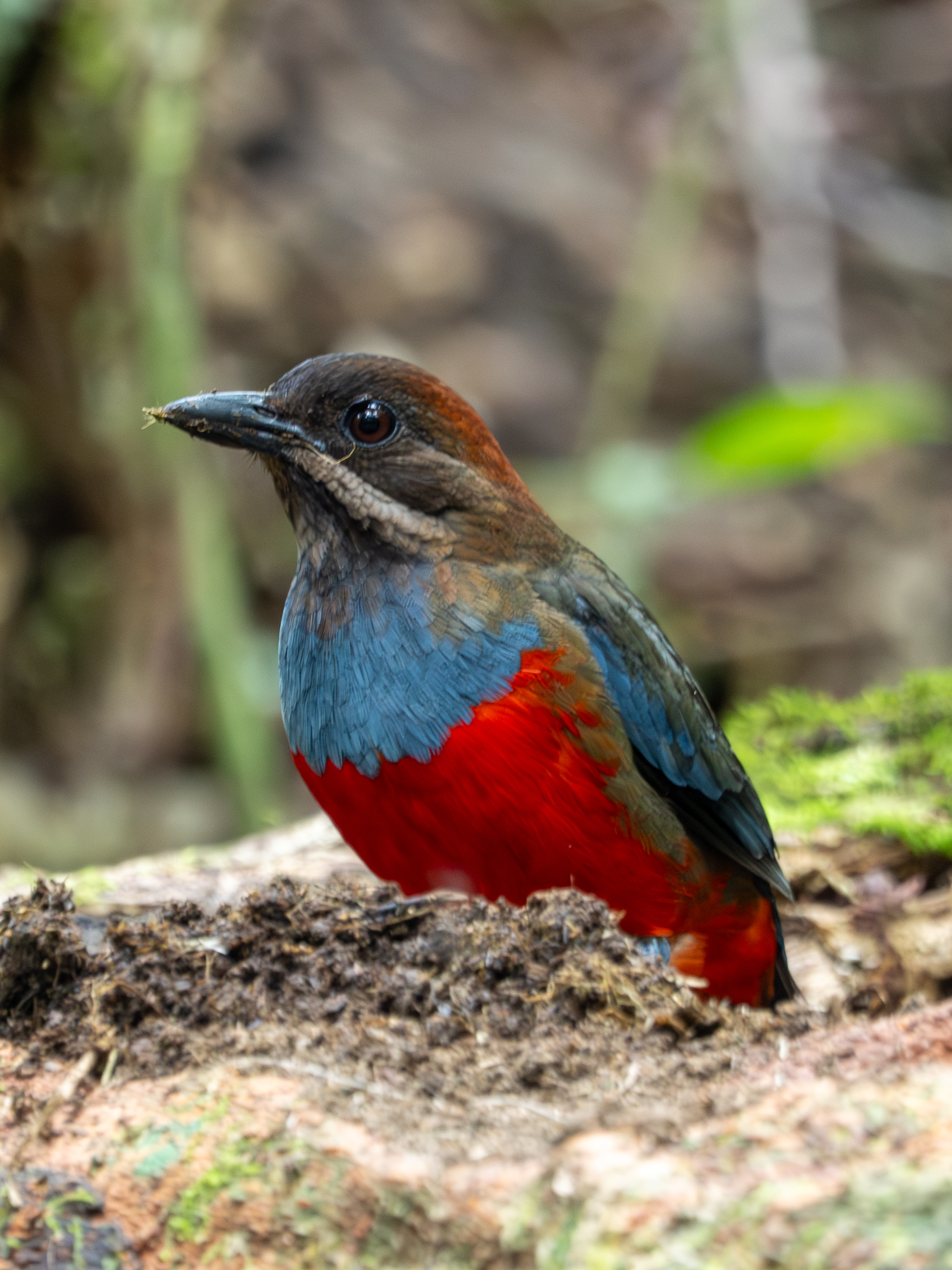
- An adult male
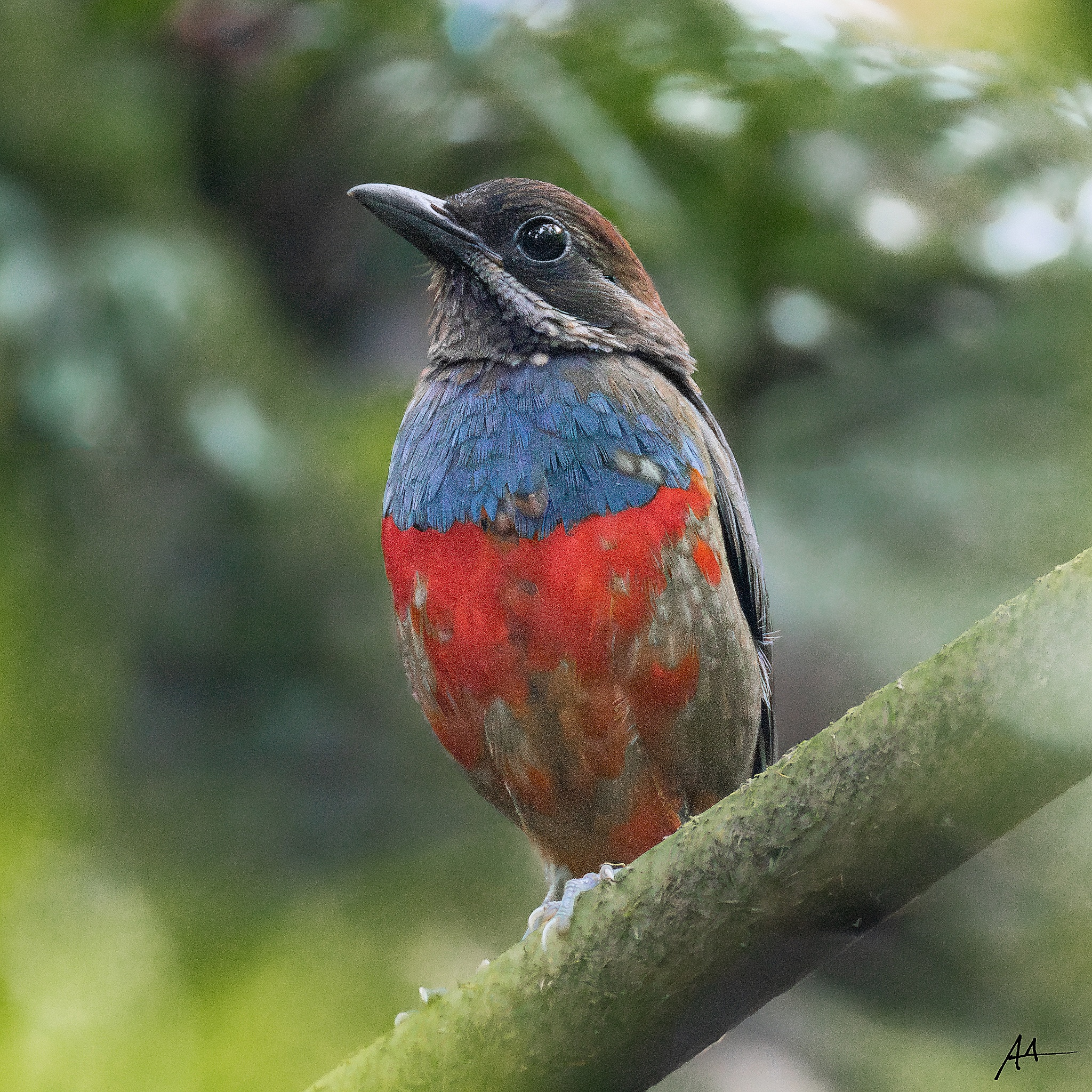
- A sub-adult

Conservation status
- Least Concern (IUCN 3.1)
- CITES Appendix I

Scientific classification
- Kingdom: Animalia
- Phylum: Chordata
- Class: Aves
- Order: Passeriformes
- Family: Pittidae
- Genus: Erythropitta
- Species: E. kochi

Binomial name
- Erythropitta kochi (Brüggemann, 1876)

Synonyms
- Pitta kochi Brüggemann, 1876

= Whiskered pitta =

Species of bird

The whiskered pitta (Erythropitta kochi) is a species of bird in the family Pittidae. It is endemic to Luzon in the Philippines. Along with the Azure-breasted pitta, it is one of two endemic pittas in the country. This bird is the largest pitta in the country reaching 23 cm long and 116 grams in mass. It has a brownish head, blue breast, and red belly. It has broad ash malar or "whiskers". Its natural habitat is tropical moist lowland forest and tropical moist montane forest. It is threatened by habitat loss and trapping. It is one of the most sought after birds by birdwatchers in the Philippines.

== Description and taxonomy ==
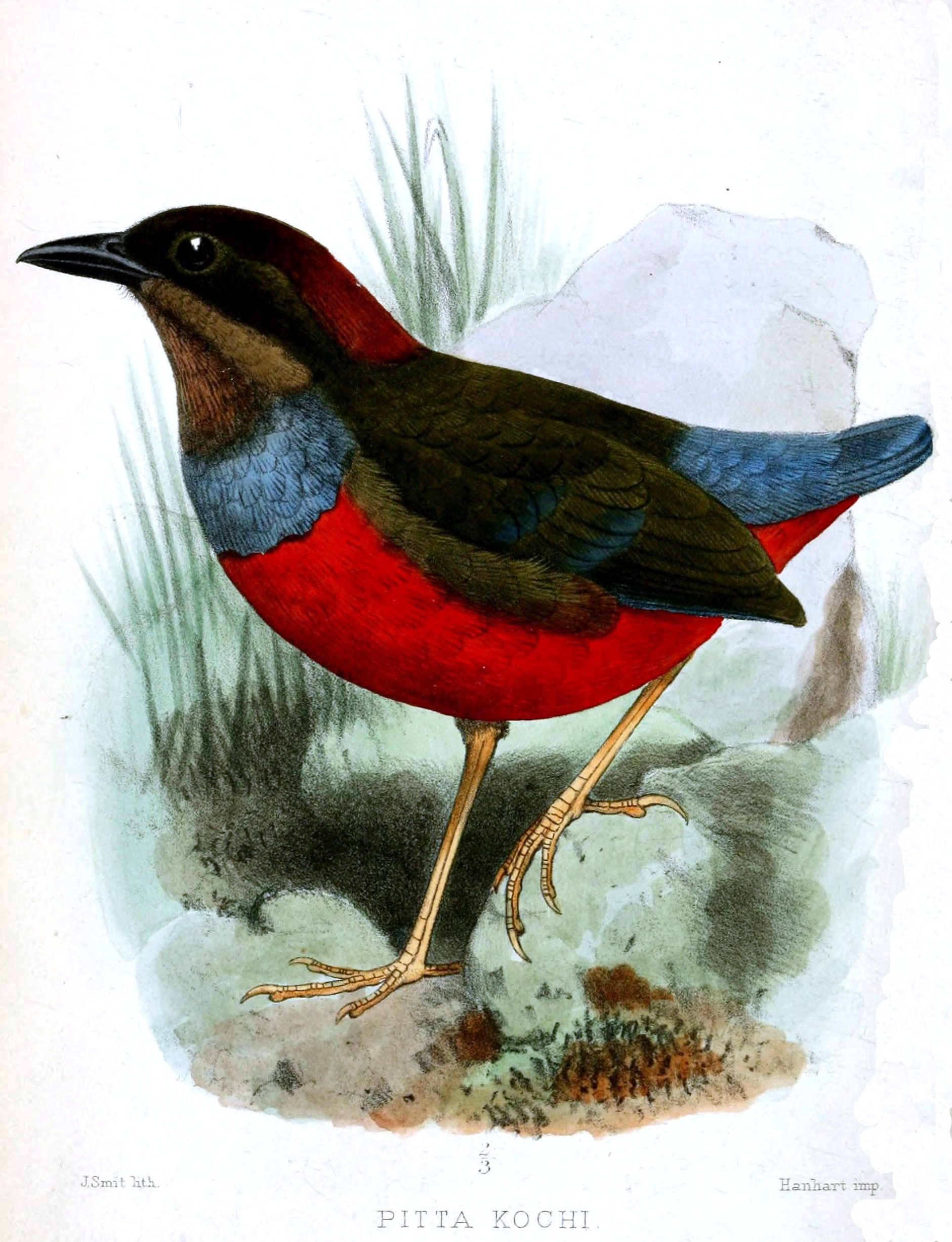
An illustration of a Whiskered Pitta by Joseph Smit.

This is a species of large ground dwelling bird found in the mid montne forests of Luzon. It has a brownish back and sides, a bright red belly and a muted blue chest, tail and wing edge. It has a reddish brown nape, a dark face and a pale moustache from which it derrives its name. Relative to other members of the pitta family, it is much larger.

Whiskered pittas exhibit sexual dimorphism in which the female has less grayish blue wing coverts and has a paler belly although these differences are not as obvious to most observers.

Its call is described as a series of 2 to 9 repetitive mournful notes. It also has a single note alarm call.

This species is monotypic.

== Ecology and behavior ==
Has been recorded feeding on small beetles and earth worms. There is a feeding station for this species in Mount Banahaw which is fed earthworms and mealworms. It forages on the ground, and seemingly shows a preference of moist ground. It often seen in areas where wild boar have disturbed the soil. It has been recorded on the migration funnel in Dalton Pass which possibly suggests intra-island migration or post-breeding dispersal.

Barely anything is known about its breeding habits. It is most vocal from February to June but immature birds have been seen as early as January. Nests seen around 1 meter above ground made of dead twigs, recorded nest contained 2 chicks.

== Habitat and conservation status ==
It chiefly inhabits montane forest, tolerating degraded and selectively logged areas. Records span a wide altitudinal range of 360 to 2,200 m. However, the highest densities found at 900-1,500 m where it typically breeds. It appears to prefer closed-canopy, primary montane, oak dominated forest, frequently on steep slopes. Its movements are poorly understood. Records from south Luzon (which may refer to wintering individuals) suggest that there is some intra-island migration.

IUCN has assessed this bird as Least Concern. This species' main threat is habitat loss with wholesale clearance of forest habitats as a result of logging, agricultural conversion and mining activities occurring within the range. It is also threatened by hunting in snare traps.

It occurs in a number of protected areas, including the Northern Sierra Madre Natural Park, Mount Pulag Natural Park, Mt. Isarog, Mount Data, Mounts Banahaw–San Cristobal Protected Landscape, Angat Watershed Forest Reserve and Aurora Memorial National Park. It is also listed as CITES Appendix I.
