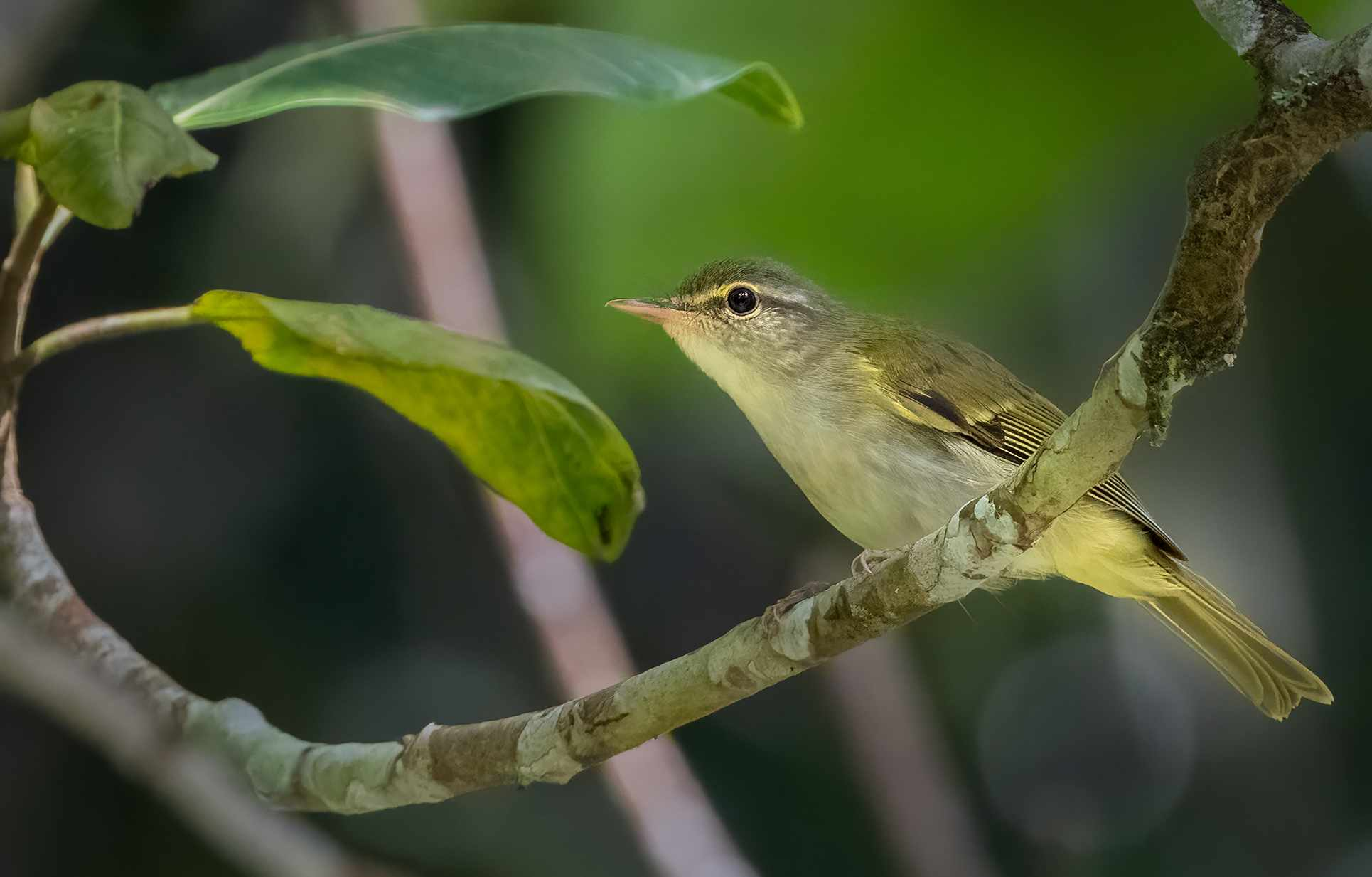

Conservation status
- Least Concern (IUCN 3.1)

Scientific classification
- Kingdom: Animalia
- Phylum: Chordata
- Class: Aves
- Order: Passeriformes
- Family: Phylloscopidae
- Genus: Phylloscopus
- Species: P. olivaceus

Binomial name
- Phylloscopus olivaceus (Moseley, 1891)

= Philippine leaf warbler =

Species of bird

The Philippine leaf warbler (Phylloscopus olivaceus) is a species of Old World warbler in the family Phylloscopidae. It is endemic to the Philippines on the islands Bohol, Samar, Leyte, Negros, Mindanao, Basilan and the Sulu Archipelago.

== Description and taxonomy ==
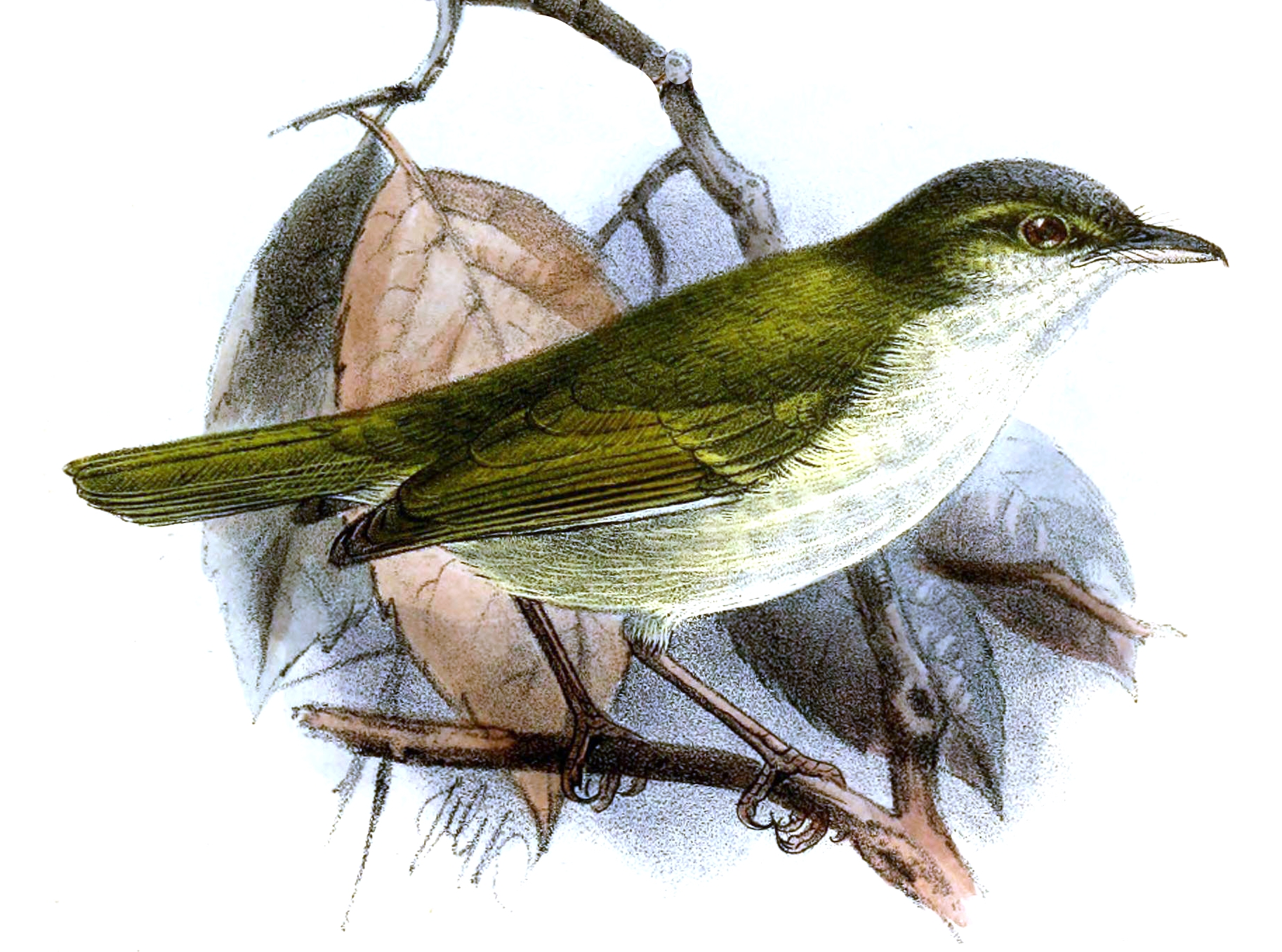
An illustration by Keulemans

This species is monotypic.

== Ecology and behavior ==
Feeds on small insects. Forages alone or joins mixed-species foraging flocks finding insects from the foliage.

Breeds from April to August but otherwise no information is known about its breeding habits and nest.

== Habitat and conservation status ==
It is found in tropical moist lowland forest and forest edge up to 1,500.

IUCN has assessed this bird as least-concern species with the population believed to be stable.

Occurs in a few protected areas like Pasonanca Natural Park, Mount Apo and Mount Kitanglad on Mindanao, Rajah Sikatuna Protected Landscape in Bohol and Samar Island Natural Park but actual protection and enforcement from illegal logging and hunting are lax.
