= Rajah Sikatuna Protected Landscape =

- IUCN category V (protected landscape/seascape)
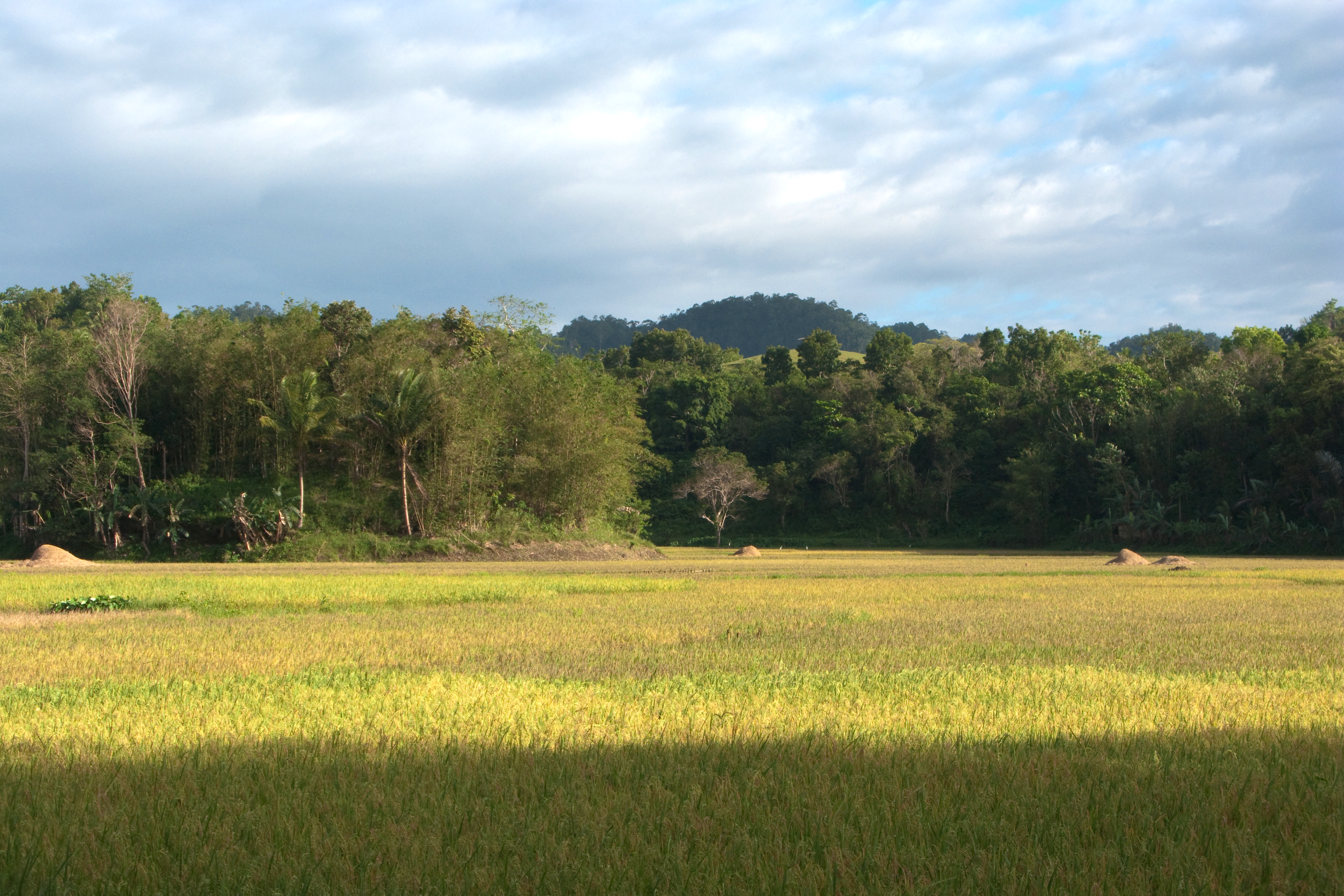
- View of the hills of Rajah Sikatuna Protected Landscape

- Location within Philippines
- Location: Bohol, Philippines
- Nearest city: Tagbilaran
- Coordinates: 9°42′19″N 124°7′27″E
- Area: 10,452.6 hectares (25,829 acres)
- Established: July 10, 1987 (National park); April 23, 2000 (Protected landscape)
- Governing body: Department of Environment and Natural Resources

The Rajah Sikatuna Protected Landscape is a protected landscape area of forested limestone hills, grasslands and natural springs in the island province of Bohol in the Central Visayas region of the Philippines. It is the largest remaining tract of natural forest in Bohol and one of the Philippines' top birdwatching sites. The park was initially gazetted a national park in 1987 covering approximately 9,023 hectares (22,300 acres). In 2000, it was reestablished as a protected landscape under the National Integrated Protected Areas System covering its present area of 10,452.6 hectares (25,829 acres). The park is one of the island's major tourist attractions located just south of the famous Chocolate Hills. It was named after the Bohol chieftain who entered into a blood-compact with Spanish conquistador Miguel López de Legazpi on the island in 1565.

== Description ==
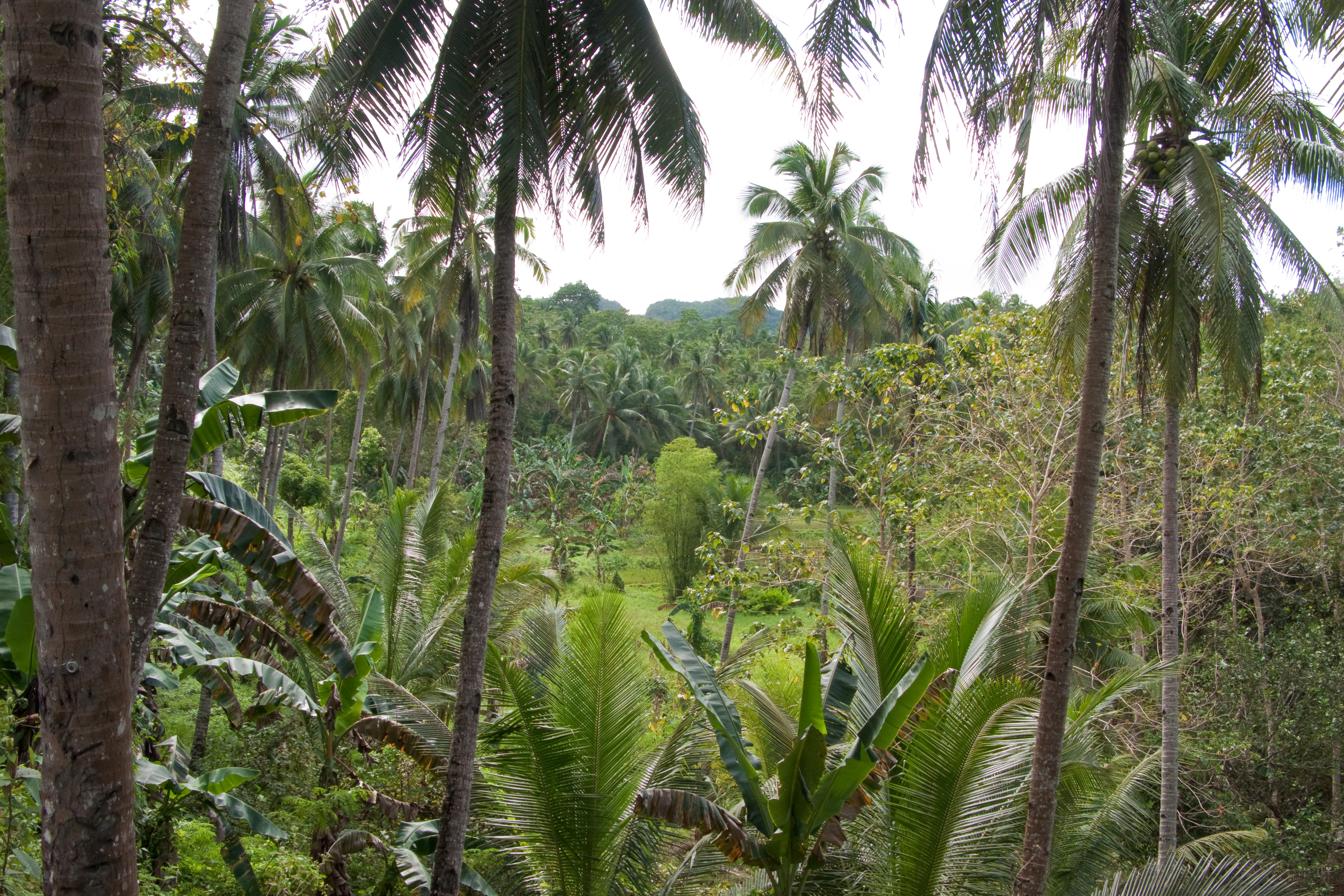
Forest in Rajah Sikatuna

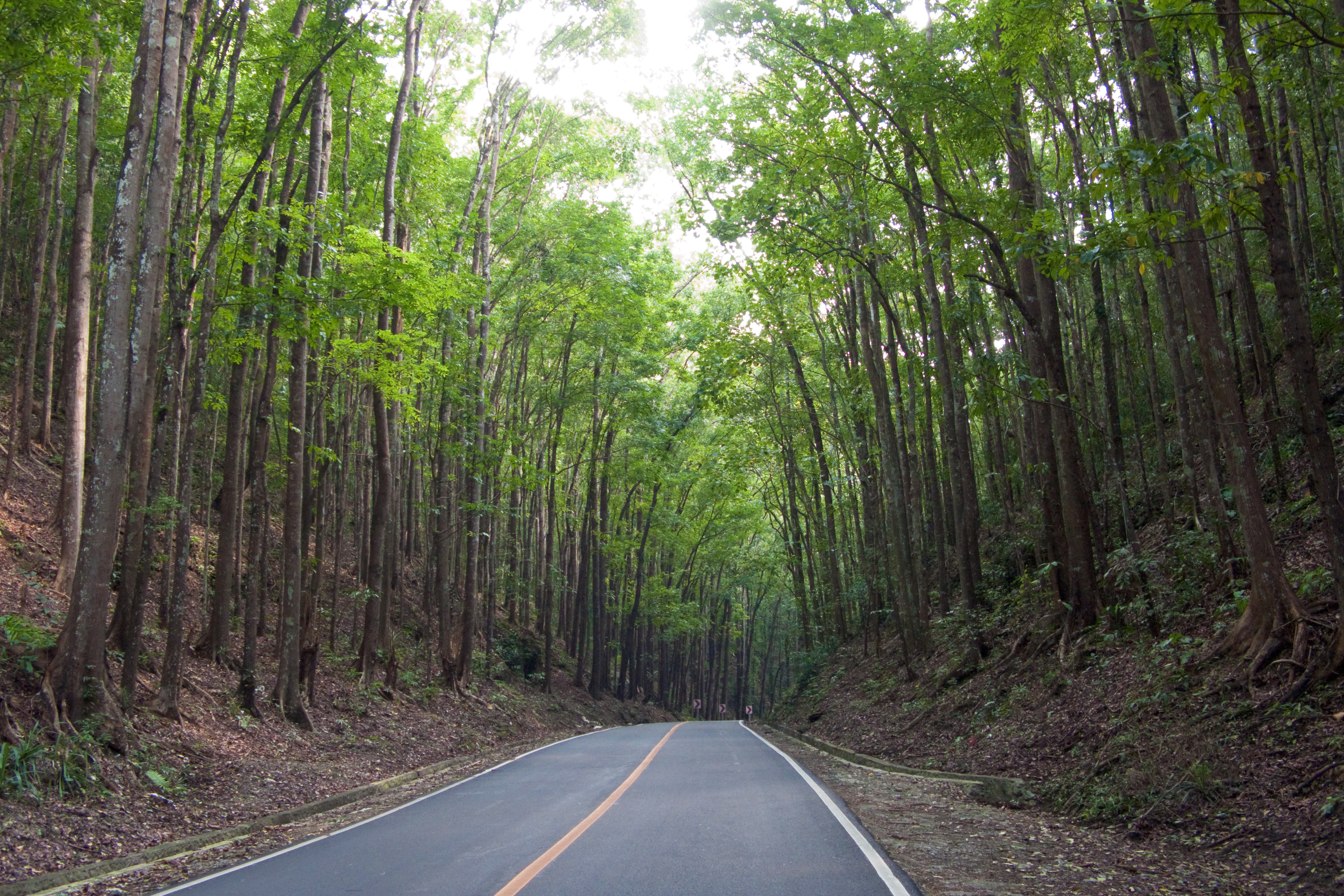
The Rajah Sikatuna forest along the national road in Bilar

The Rajah Sikatuna park occupies the low mountain range in the south of Bohol island which corresponds geographically with the municipalities of Carmen, Sierra Bullones, Garcia Hernandez, Valencia, Dimiao, Bilar, Loboc and Batuan. It is characterized by rolling hills with remnants of natural forest on steep limestone terrain surrounded by plantation forest, denuded hills and grasslands. The park has an average elevation of 400 metres (1,300 ft) and is composed of 60% limestone forest, 15% grassland, 5% plantations, and 10% permanent agricultural areas. It also contains the Bilar Peak, one of the highest in the province at 1,673 feet (510 m) above sea level, as well as 4 mountain springs that supply water to the surrounding communities namely, the Logarita, Anislag, Mabugnao and Aghuban springs.

The park has more than 30 kilometers of marked trails for wildlife observation, over 100 caves, a camping area and a swimming pool. At the summit of Bilar Peak, an observation tower has been constructed providing panoramic views of the park and surrounding countryside, including the nearby island of Panglao and even Cebu. Near the park's entrance is a tunnel that leads to Magsaysay Park, a cleared area situated next to a ranger station and the Logarita spring. The park charges an entrance fee of P100.

== Wildlife ==
The Rajah Sikatuna Protected Landscape is an important bird area being home to over 120 bird species, many of which are endemic to the Philippines, which include the endangered streaked reed warbler and Philippine cockatoo, as well as the Philippine hawk-eagle, Visayan broadbill, Samar hornbill, Mindanao bleeding-heart, Philippine eagle-owl, Philippine oriole, Philippine frogmouth, azure-breasted pitta, rufous-tailed jungle flycatcher, rufous-lored kingfisher, southern silvery kingfisher, yellow-breasted tailorbird, yellow-bellied whistler, black-crowned babbler, Philippine hanging parrot, Philippine fairy-bluebird, Philippine trogon and Philippine leaf warbler.

The park also supports six species of large mammals namely, the Philippine tarsier, long-tailed macaque, Philippine flying lemur, Malayan civet, Asian palm civet and Philippine warty pig. It is also a habitat of some rodent species, such as the Philippine forest rat, rice-field rat and Mindanao hairy-tailed rat. The more than 100 caves also hold several species of bats and swiftlets. Its forest cover is dominated by native dipterocarp trees such as molave.

== Accessibility ==
The park is located approximately 40 kilometres (25 mi) east of the island's capital and largest city, Tagbilaran. It is easily accessible via an 8-kilometer road from the Loay Interior Road in Bilar which also leads to the Chocolate Hills, from either the Tagbilaran–Corella–Sikatuna–Loboc Road or the Tagbilaran East Road from Panglao.

== See also ==
- Central Cebu Protected Landscape
- Olango Island Group
- Loboc River
