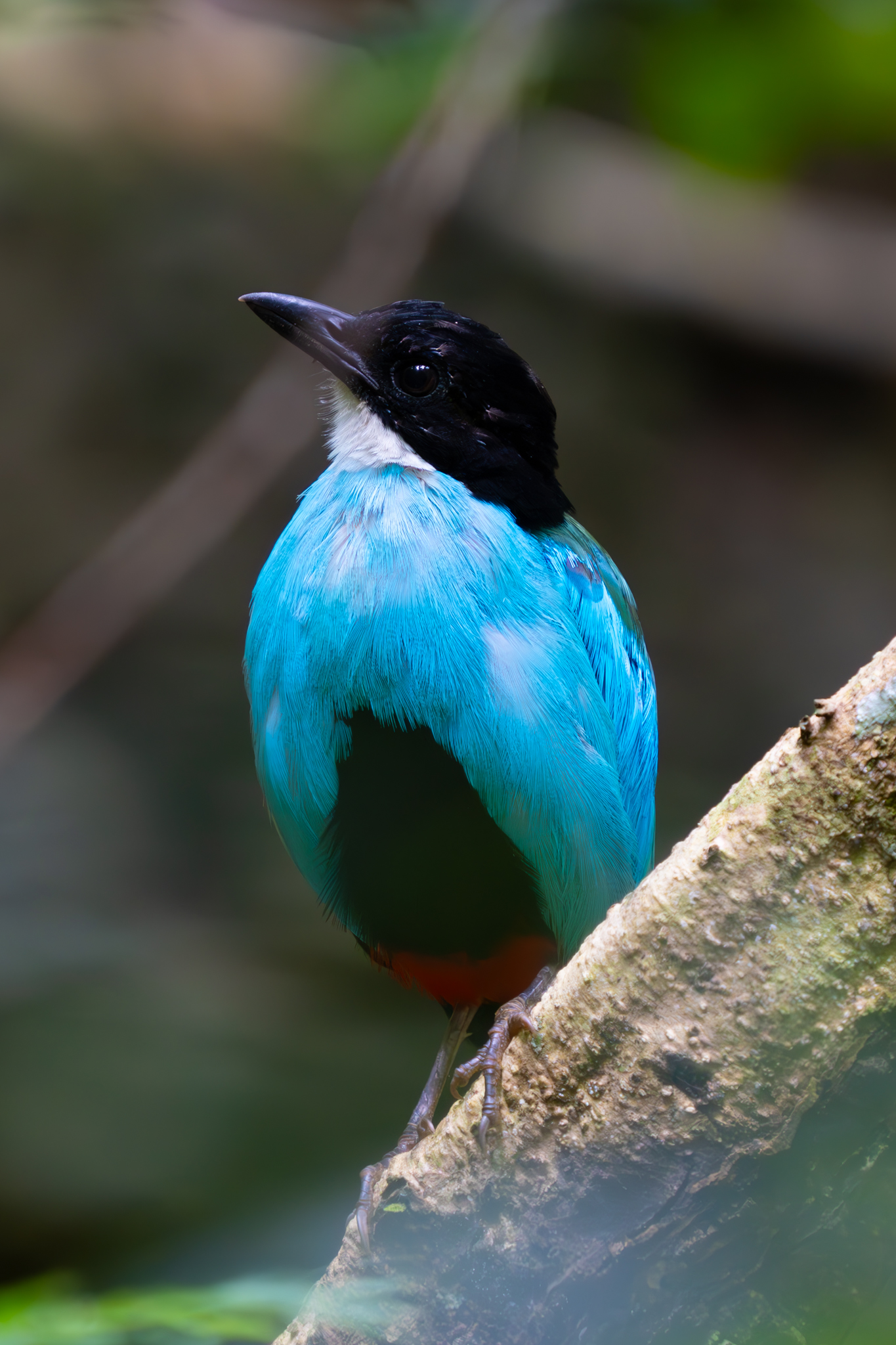
- ssp. coelestis
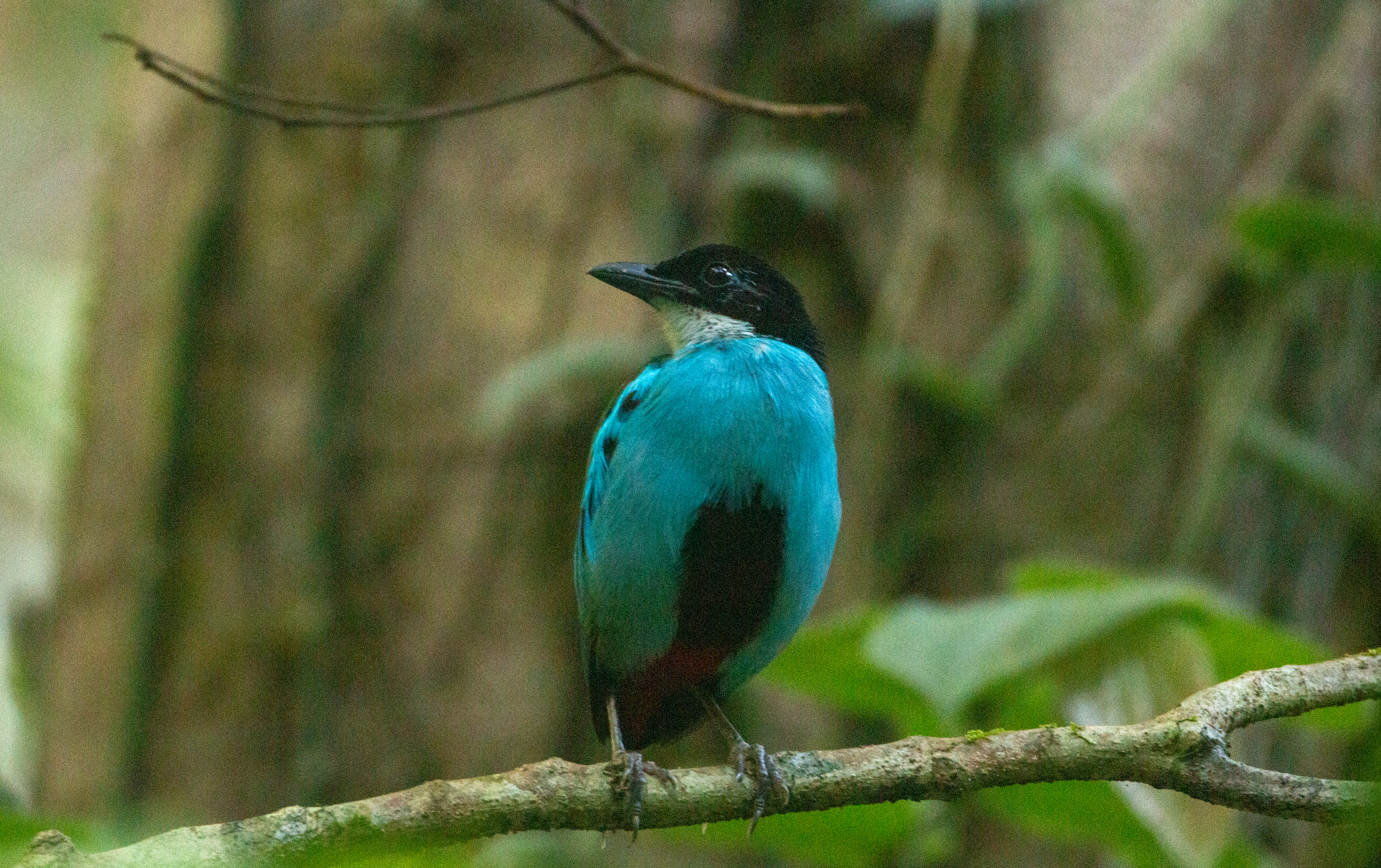
- nominate subspecies

Conservation status
- Vulnerable (IUCN 3.1)

Scientific classification
- Kingdom: Animalia
- Phylum: Chordata
- Class: Aves
- Order: Passeriformes
- Family: Pittidae
- Genus: Pitta
- Species: P. steerii

Binomial name
- Pitta steerii (Sharpe, 1876)

= Azure-breasted pitta =

Species of bird

The azure-breasted pitta (Pitta steerii) is a species of bird in the family Pittidae. It is a striking and colorful bird having colors of red, azure, green, black and white, It is endemic to the islands of Mindanao, Bohol, Leyte and Samar in the Philippines. Along with the Whiskered pitta, it is one of two endemic pittas in the country. Its natural habitat is tropical moist lowland forest. It is threatened by habitat loss.

== Description and taxonomy ==
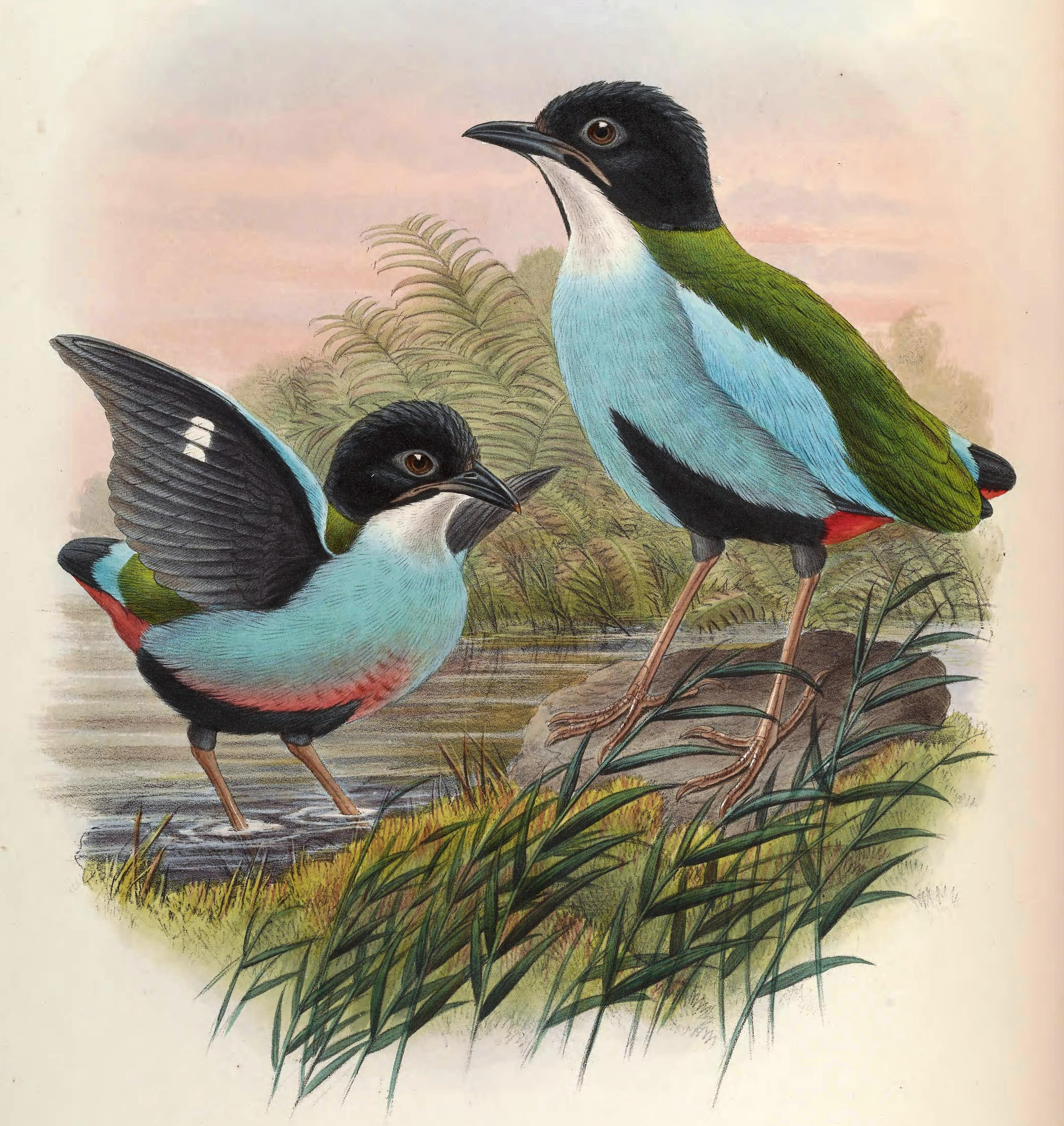
An illustration by John Gould

This is a medium sized bird found on the forest floor in the lowland forests of East Visayas and Mindanao. It has a green back, black head, a red vent, a blue wing, a black belly and a striking azure on its chest. Like all pittas, it is long legged and has a very short tail. Iris is dark brown and the bill is black. It has pinkish brown legs.

This species does not exhibit any clear sexual dimorphism.

=== Subspecies ===
Two subspecies are recognized:

- P. s. steeri – Found on Mindanao; Darker and has a stronger green tinge
- P. s. coelestis – Found on Bohol, Leyte and Samar; Paler in colour

== Ecology and behavior ==
Feeds on insects and worms. Forages on the ground, fallen logs and boulders, flicking over dead leaves with its bill.

Breeding basically unknown. On Bohol, most vocal active in April to June, which serves as the breeding season for a large majority of Philippine birds. Juveniles seen on Samar and Bohol in the months of Jun and July. Nest is still undescribed.

== Habitat and conservation status ==
It is found in tropical moist lowland forest with dense understory up to 1,000 meters above sea level but more common below 600 meters. It prefers forests with limestone outcrops.

IUCN has assessed this bird as Vulnerable with the population being estimated at 2,500 to 9,999 mature individuals remaining. This species' main threat is habitat loss with wholesale clearance of forest habitats as a result of logging, agricultural conversion and mining activities occurring within the range. The most affected part of its range is Bohol which only has 4% forest cover remaining.

Occurs in a few protected areas in Rajah Sikatuna Protected Landscape in Bohol and Samar Island Natural Park but actual protection and enforcement from illegal logging and hunting are lax.

Conservation actions proposed are to do fieldwork and exploration to better understand its status and distribution. It's also recommended that its preference for limestone areas be further studied.

== Gallery ==
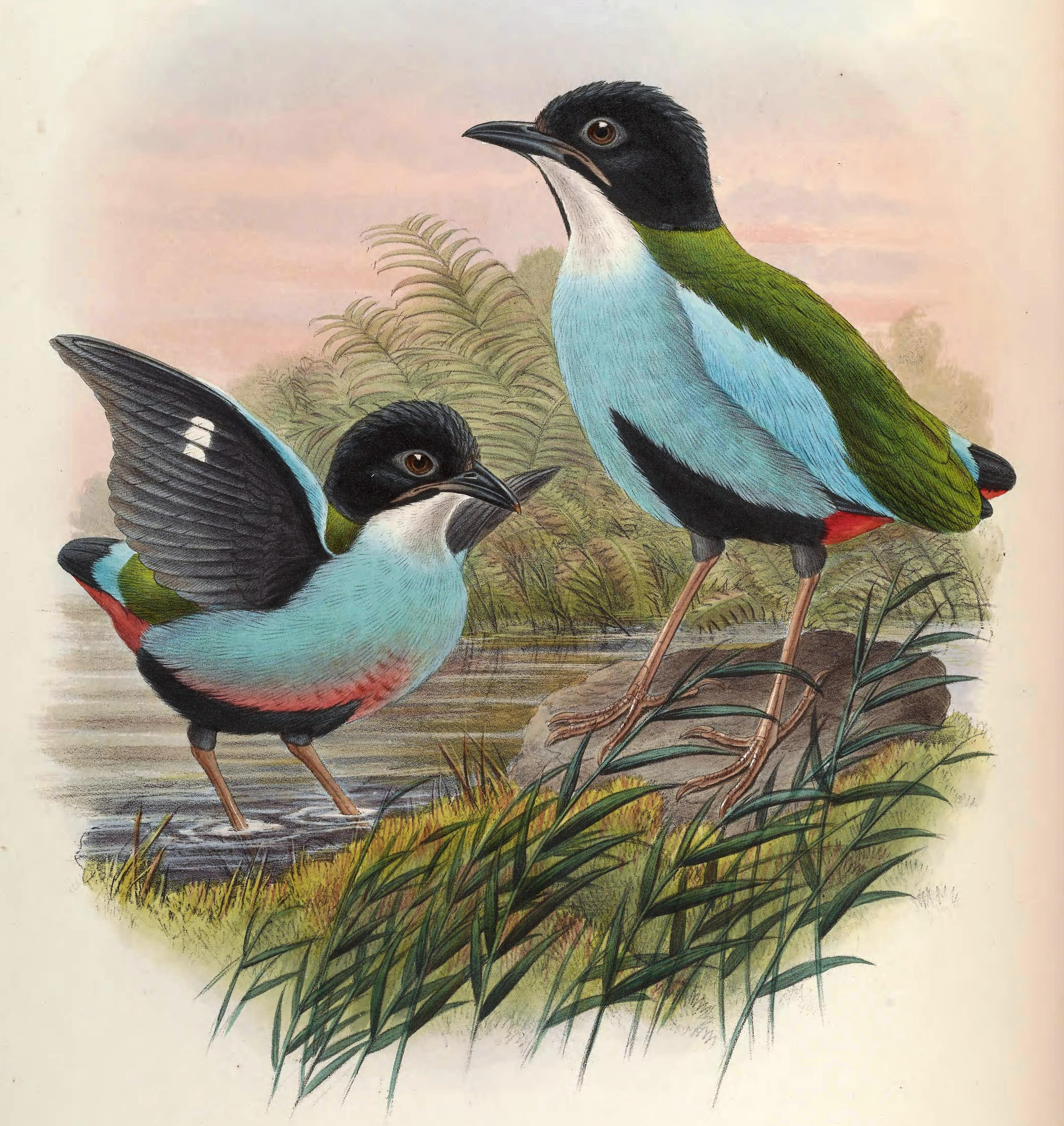
An illustration.

ssp. steerii

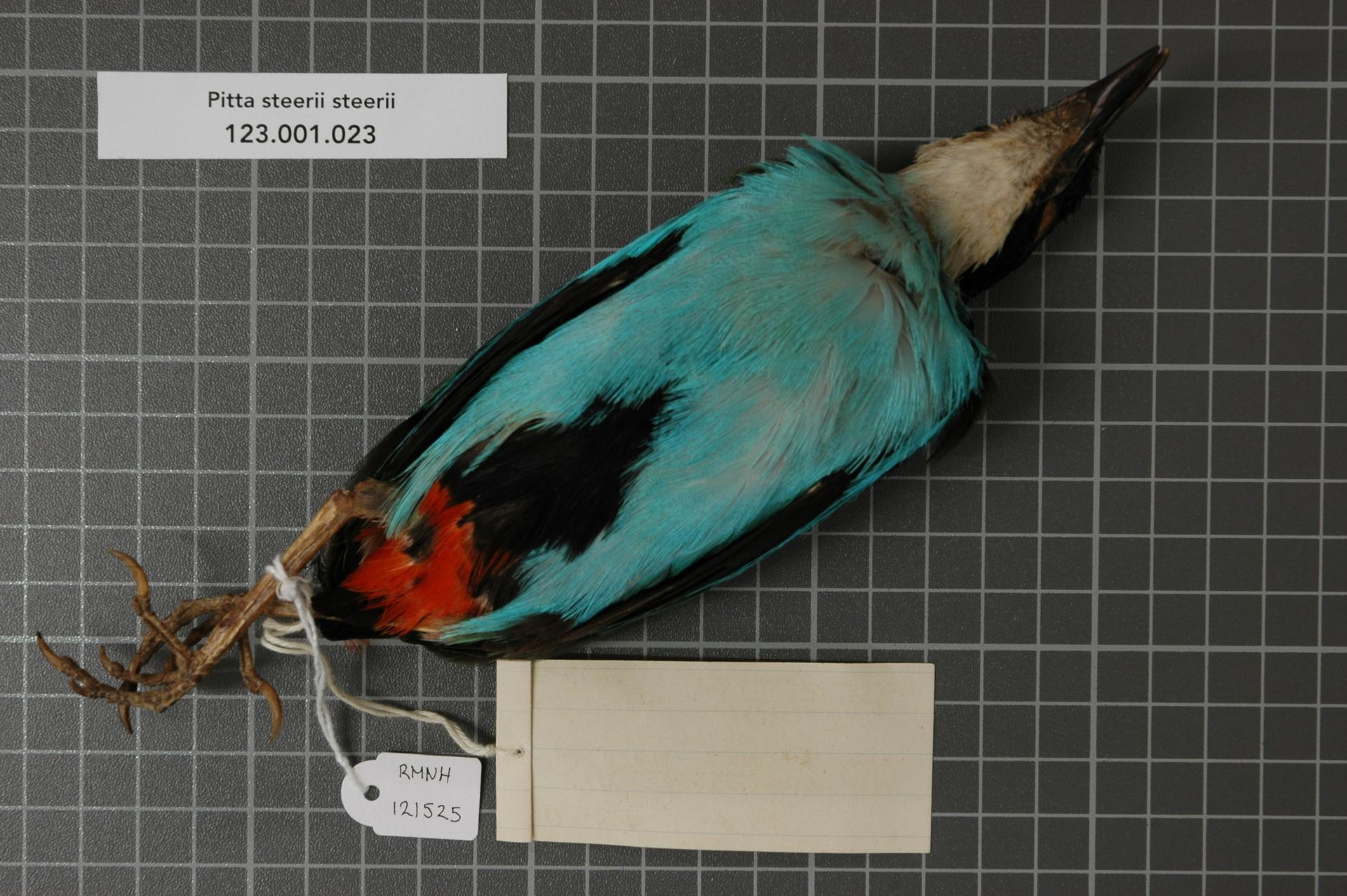
A specimen from the Naturalis Biodiversity Center

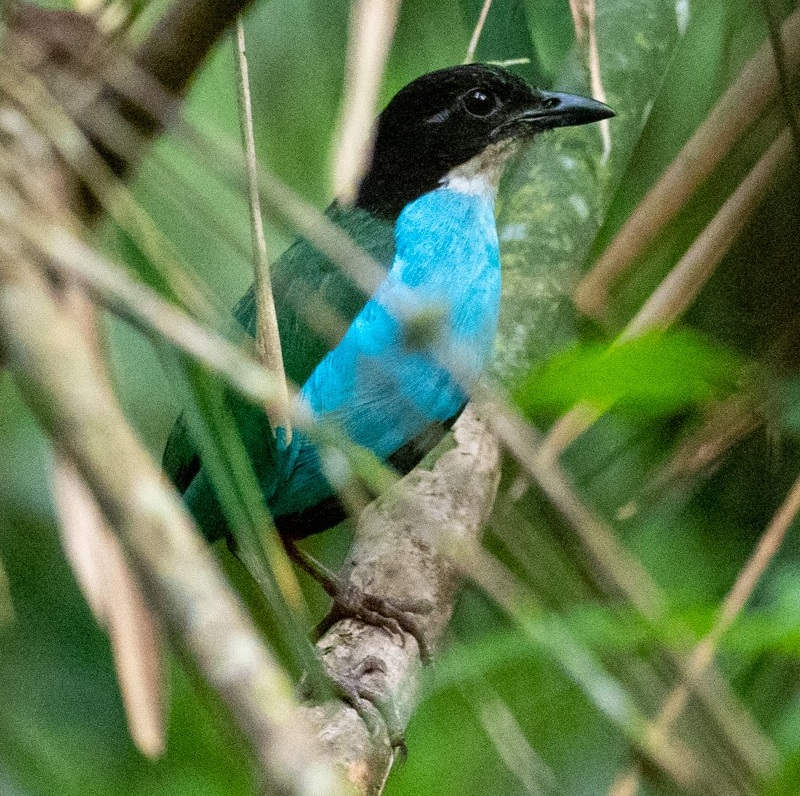
ssp. steerii
