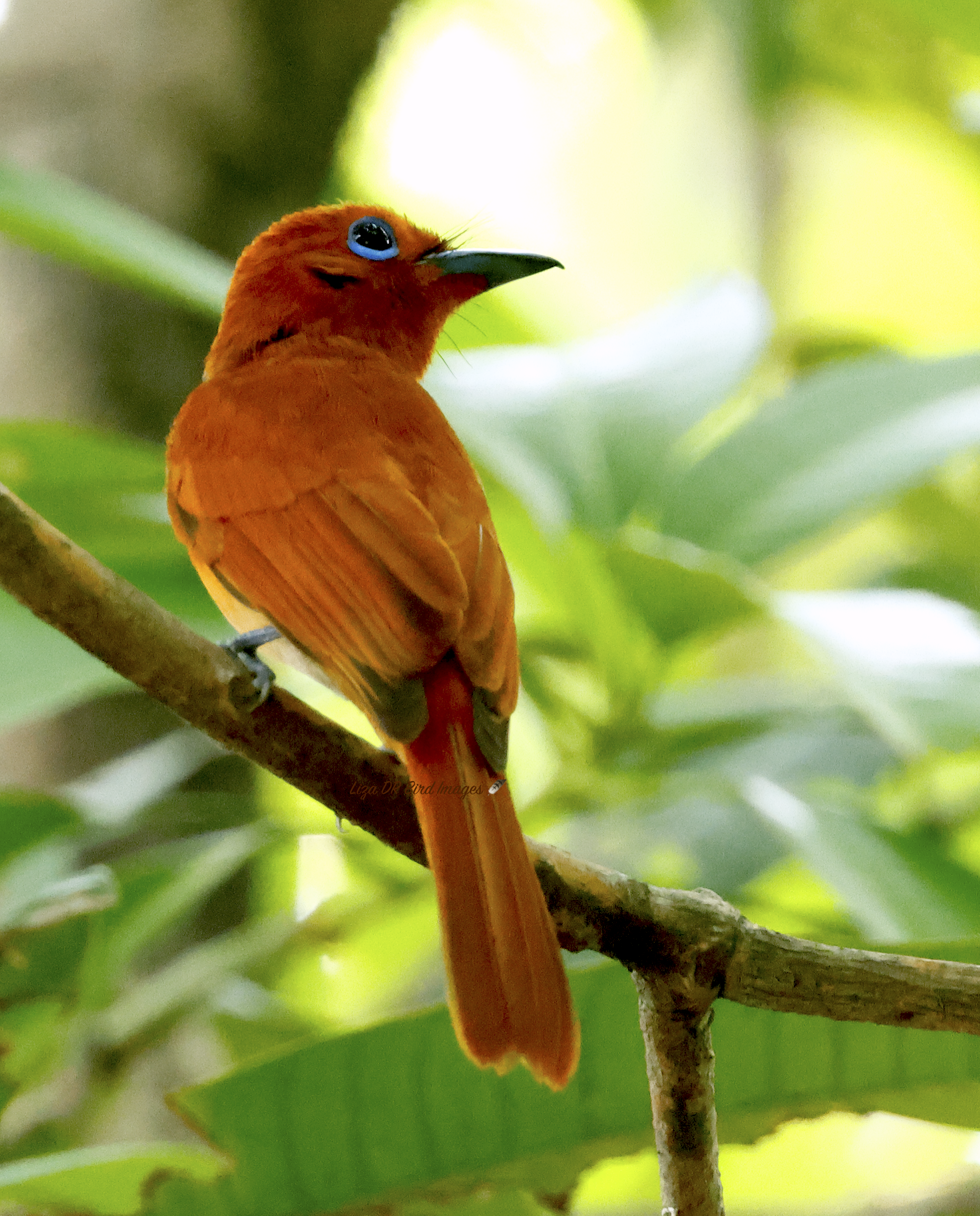
- A male ssp. unirufa in Luzon
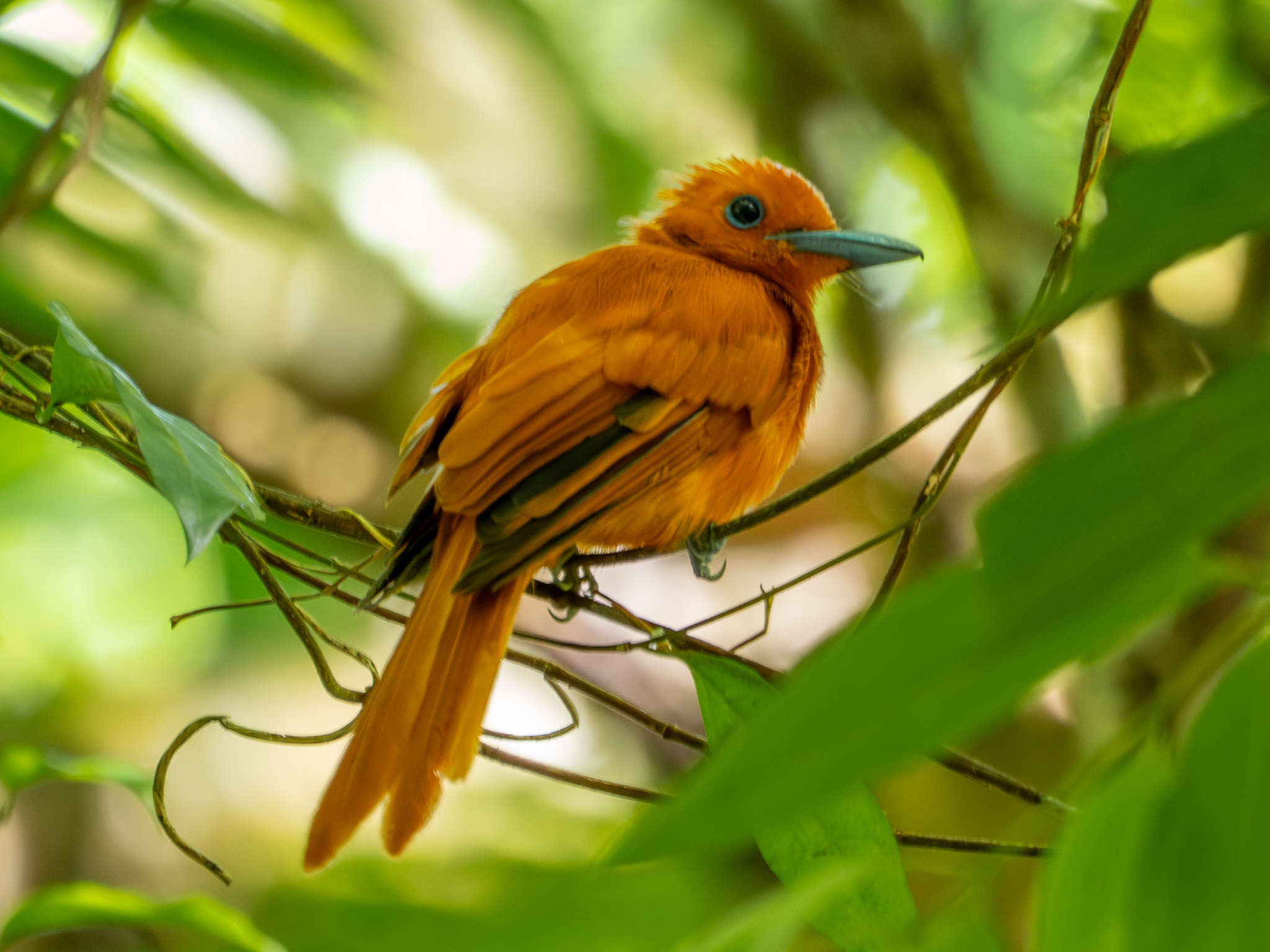
- A male of the nominate subspecies in Camiguin

Conservation status
- Least Concern (IUCN 3.1)

Scientific classification
- Kingdom: Animalia
- Phylum: Chordata
- Class: Aves
- Order: Passeriformes
- Family: Monarchidae
- Genus: Terpsiphone
- Species: T. cinnamomea

Binomial name
- Terpsiphone cinnamomea (Sharpe, 1877)

Subspecies
- See text

Synonyms
- Zeocephus cinnamomeus

= Rufous paradise flycatcher =

Species of bird

The rufous paradise flycatcher (Terpsiphone cinnamomea) is a species of bird in the family Monarchidae native to Indonesia and the Philippines. Its natural habitat is tropical moist lowland forests.

== Description ==
The rufous paradise flycatcher is rufous with a blue bill and a blue eye-ring. Northern males have extended central tail feathers. Females and southern males have a paler belly. Its call is a repetitive series of upslurred whistled notes or a shorter, nasal grating call, "greet grr-grr," with the first note upslurred".

== Taxonomy ==
Three subspecies are recognized:

- Northern paradise-flycatcher (T. c. unirufa) - Salomonsen, 1937: Originally described as a separate species. Found in the northern Philippines
- T. c. cinnamomea - (Sharpe, 1877): Found in the southern Philippines
- Talaud paradise-flycatcher (T. c. talautensis) - (Meyer, AB & Wiglesworth, 1894): Originally described as a separate species. Found on the Talaud Islands (far northern Indonesia)

== Ecology and behavior ==
The rufous paradise flycatcher forages in the understory for insects and often joins mixed-species flocks that include Celestial monarch, Short-crested monarch Blue-headed fantail, Golden-crowned babbler, Lemon-throated leaf warbler, Black-crowned babbler, and other small birds. Breeding season thought to be April to July. Nest is a neat cup made out of plant fibers and then covered with moss and lichens. One nest was discovered to contain three eggs but average clutch size is not yet known.

== Distribution and habitat ==
The rufous paradise flycatcher occurs in multiple protected areas such as Pasonanca Natural Park, Kalbario–Patapat Natural Park, Samar Island Natural Park in the Philippines. It inhabits primary and secondary forest up to an elevation of 1,200 m (3,900 ft).

IUCN has assessed both the Northern and Southern rufous paradise flycatchers as least-concern species. It is generally uncommon. While not threatened, deforestation in the Philippines continues throughout the country due to slash and burn farming, mining, illegal logging and habitat conversion.
