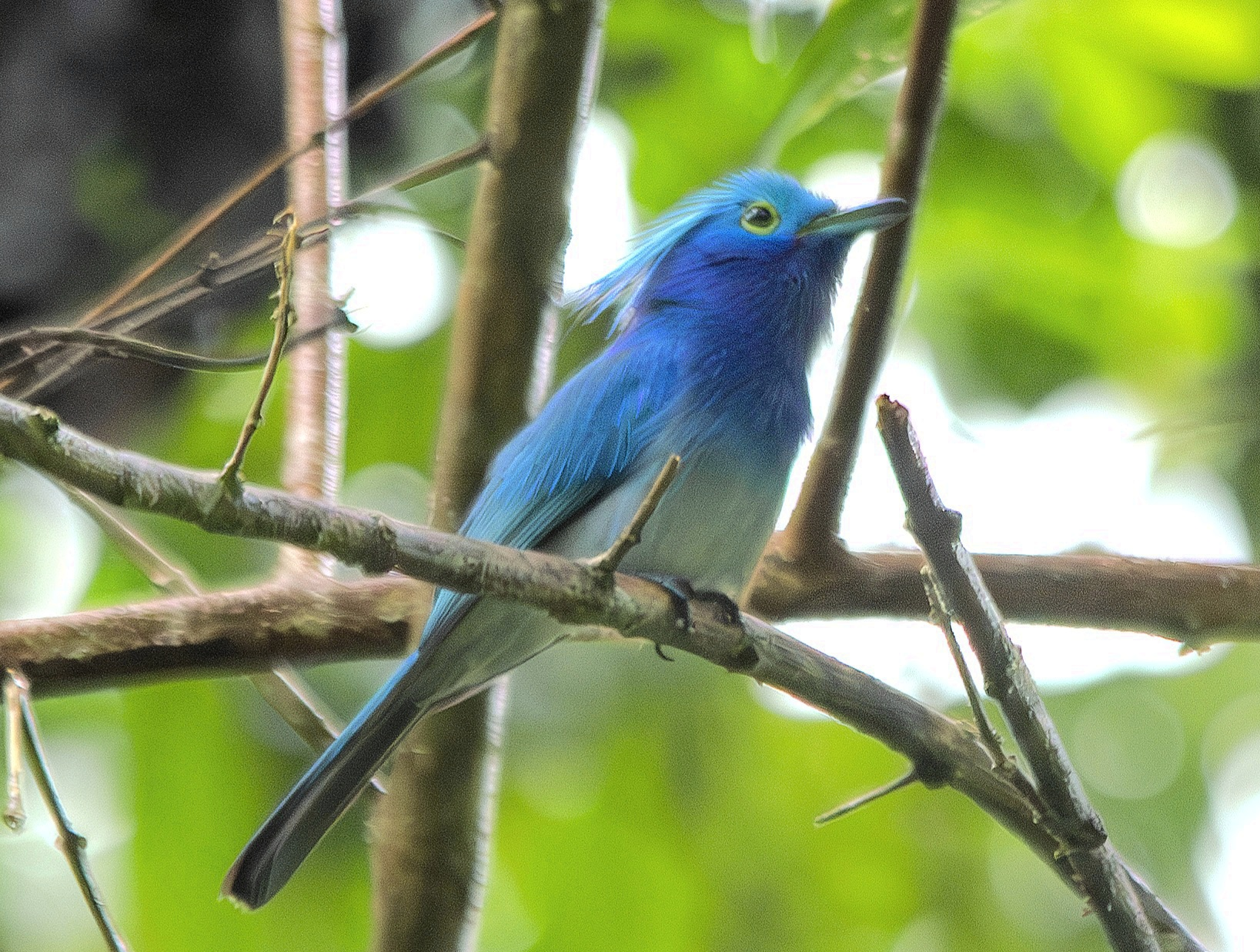
- A photo of a calling male in Bislig
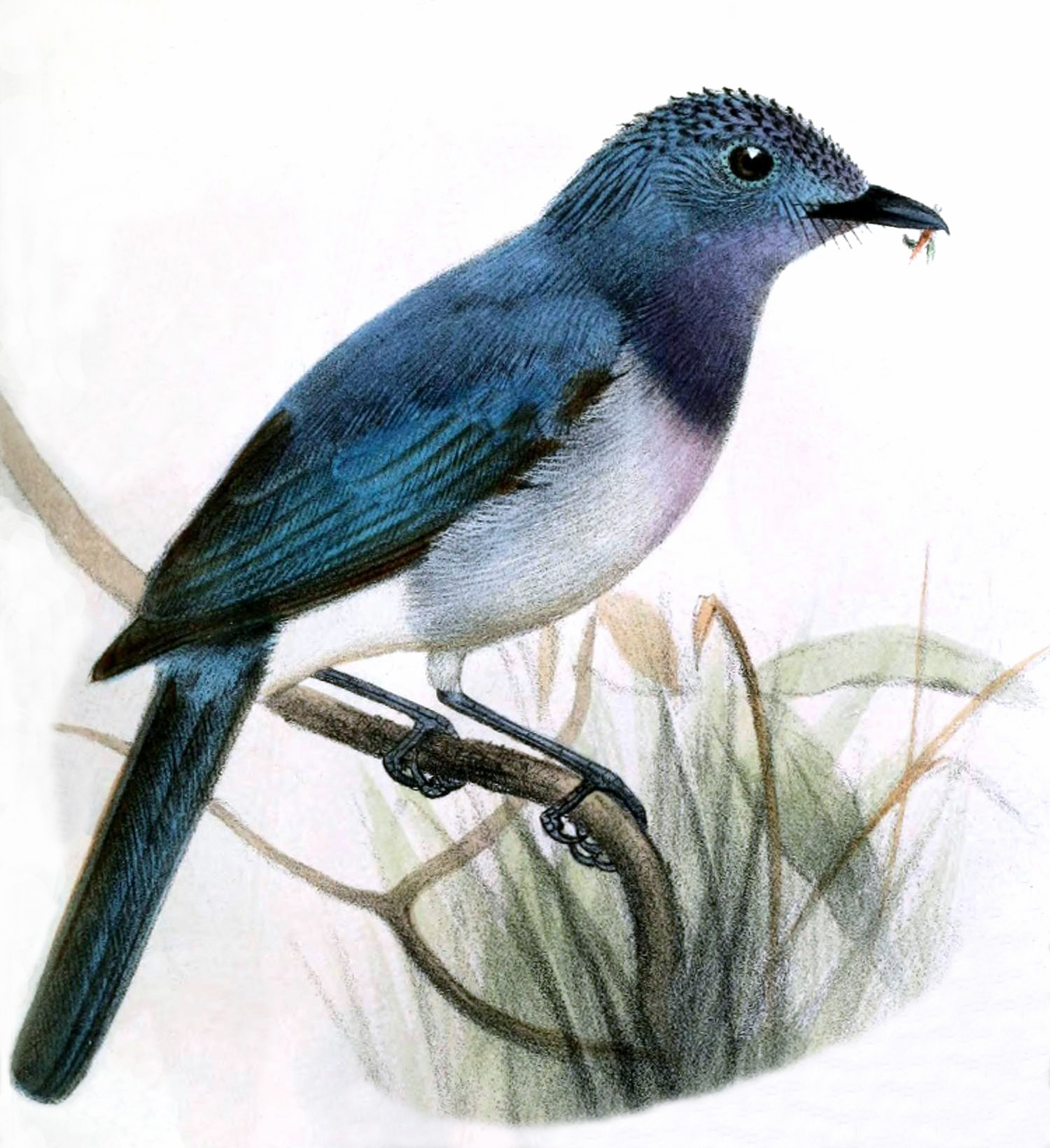
- Female lithograph by Smit. Yellow eye-ring and crest not drawn in.

Conservation status
- Vulnerable (IUCN 3.1)

Scientific classification
- Kingdom: Animalia
- Phylum: Chordata
- Class: Aves
- Order: Passeriformes
- Family: Monarchidae
- Genus: Hypothymis
- Species: H. coelestis

Binomial name
- Hypothymis coelestis Tweeddale, 1877

Subspecies
- Hypothymis coelestis coelestis; Hypothymis coelestis rabori

= Celestial monarch =

Species of bird

The celestial monarch (Hypothymis coelestis) is a species of bird in the family Monarchidae, and one of the most attractive of all the monarch flycatchers. It is identified as a turquoise blue bird with a long and spectacular cerulean blue crest and large greenish-yellow wattle. It is endemic to the Philippines with its extant range being in Luzon, Samar, Mindanao Tawi-Tawi and Basilan and it being possibly extinct on Negros and Sibuyan Island.Its natural habitat is tropical moist lowland forests up to 750 masl. There is an unverified report of this bird in 2024 in Leyte. It is one of the most sought after birds by birdwatchers in the Philippines and in the world.

== Description and taxonomy ==
A small bird found in lowland primary forest. It has turquoise colored wings and tail, a white belly, a darker indigo chest and neck, cerulean blue head and crest and a greenish-yellow wattle.

These birds exhibit sexual dimorphism in which the males have much longer crests and a more intense coloration overall while the females having shorter crests, less intense blue colors and a generally smaller size. Males are known to raise their crests when agitated, usually seen in response hearing other males or sensing a threat.

Its call is described as a loud ringing three note whistle transcribed as "pwee pwee pwee". It also has a raspy contact call.

An alternate name for the celestial monarch is the celestial blue monarch.

=== Subspecies ===
Two subspecies are recognized:

- H. c. coelestis - Tweeddale, 1877: Found on Luzon, Samar, Dinagat, Mindanao, Basilan and Tawi-Tawi.
- H. c. rabori - Rand, 1970: Found on Sibuyan and Negros. This subspecies has not been recorded in Negros since 1959 and in Sibuyan in the 1990s and may now be extinct.

== Ecology and behavior ==
The diet of the celestial monarch consists of insects. It is often observed in mixed flocks with other birds such as blue fantails, rusty-crowned babblers, rufous paradise flycatchers, both short-crested monarchs and black-naped monarchs and other small forest birds.

Barely anything is known about this species breeding behaviour. Immature birds have been seen in the months of May in Luzon and December in Negros. Males with enlarged gonads have been collected in April on Samar and May to June on Mindanao. Mating behaviour, nesting behaviour and nests are undescribed.

== Habitat and conservation status ==
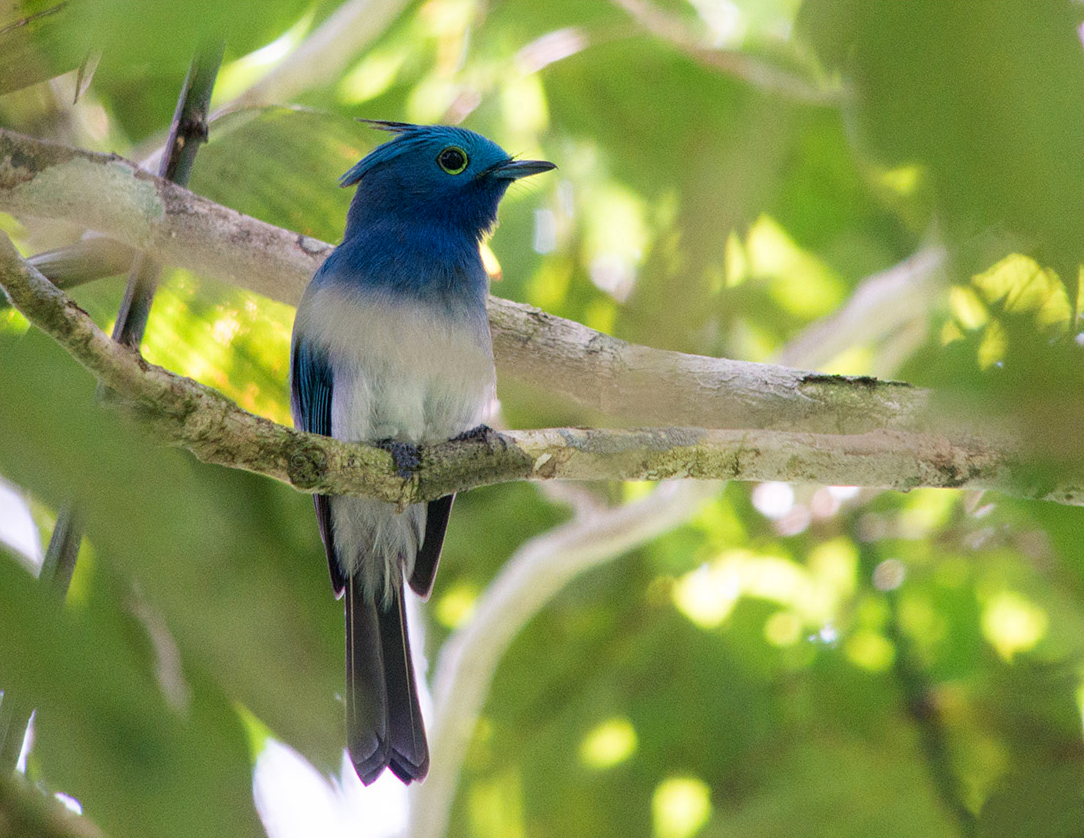
Male seen in Bislig, Surigao del Sur. Photo by Adri Constantino of Birding Philippines.

Its natural habitat is tropical moist lowland forests up to 750 meters above sea level but usually much lower. It is believed to be a riverine specialist especially in areas with a distinct dry season. It is often seen in the canopy.

IUCN has assessed this bird as vulnerable with estimates the population to be just 1,000 to 2,499 mature individuals remaining with the population continuing to decrease due to habitat loss.

Lowland forests is the most threatened type of forest in the country. This is due to them being deforested for high-value lumber and destroyed through Slash-and-burn or kaigin. This bird is now extremely rare in Luzon with most records now being in Mindanao and Samar. Majority of the records in Mindanao are in Bislig, Surigao del Sur which has faced rapid destruction in the past few years after the company that once owned a concession was closed down in 2005 and was overrun with illegal logging and converted into exotic monoculture plantations which cannot support these birds. This beautiful insectivore is declining rapidly, with recent surveys revealing its presence at only 10 sites with many local extinctions occurring in its former range. The West Visayas sub-species rabori is now feared extinct. Widespread and continuing reduction of its lowland habitat leaves its population severely fragmented and its status is vulnerable according to the Red Data Book of Threatened Birds of Asia.The Philippine Red List goes further lists the celestial monarch as critically endangered.

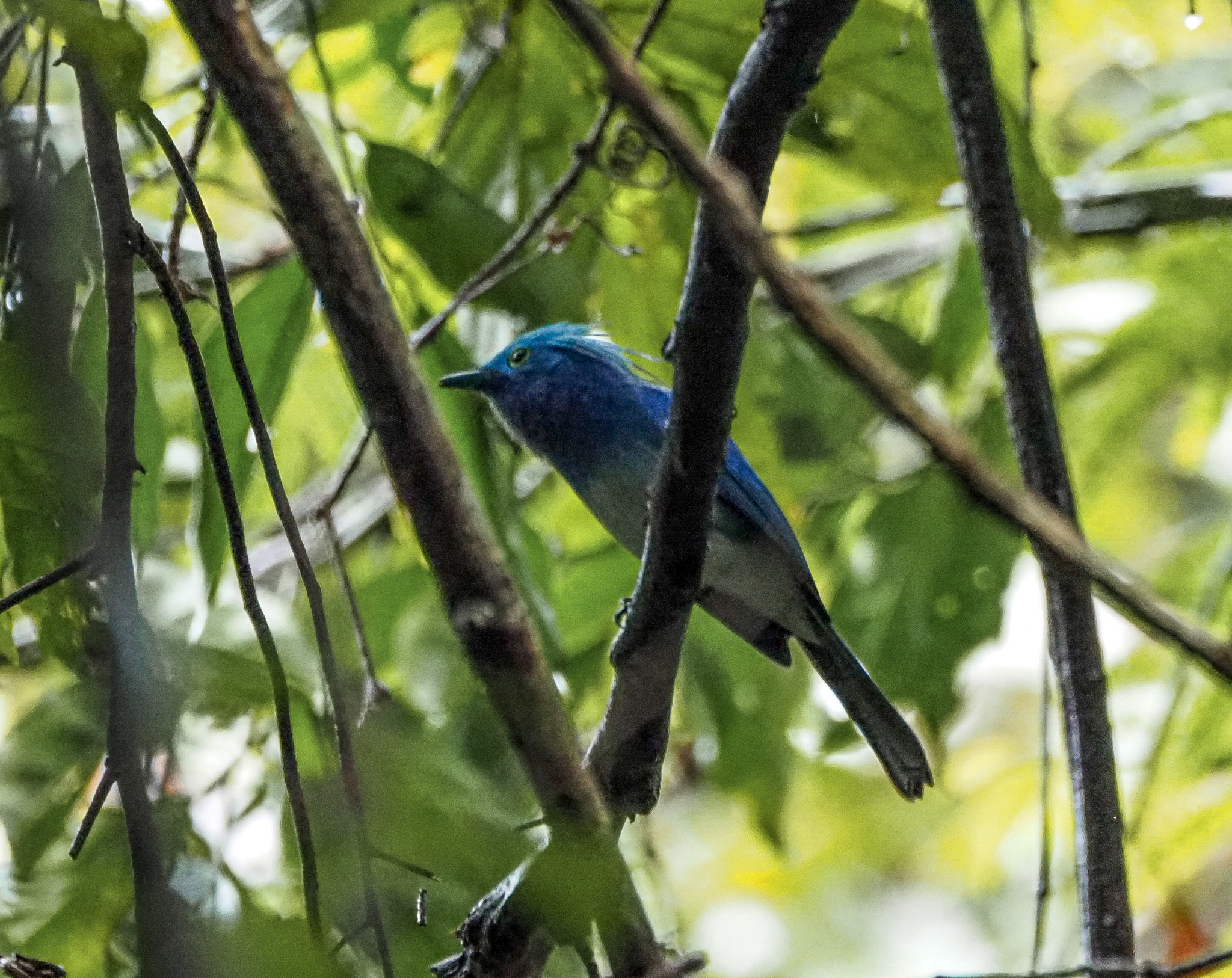
Male seen in Samar

It has been recently recorded in the protected areas in the Northern Sierra Madre Natural Park and Samar Island Natural Park and two further sites proposed for conservation funding on Tawi-Tawi and Dinagat Islands. However, these "protected" areas face lax protection and enforcement from Illegal logging and land conversion. As of 2021 there are no species specific conservation plans.

Conservation actions proposed are more surveys across its range and in areas with suitable habitat for this bird. This bird has not been recorded in Luzon since the 2010s, Negros and Sibuyan since the 1970s and Tawi-tawi in the 1990s so these areas must be resurveyed to verify if they still exist. The islands of Leyte and Panay may also hold these birds. In 2024, a biologist from the Philippine Eagle Foundation reported hearing this bird in Leyte but this record is yet to be fully verified. More effective management and protection of its habitat must be done to better protect this bird. It's also proposed that this species may be a flagship species due to its striking appearance.
