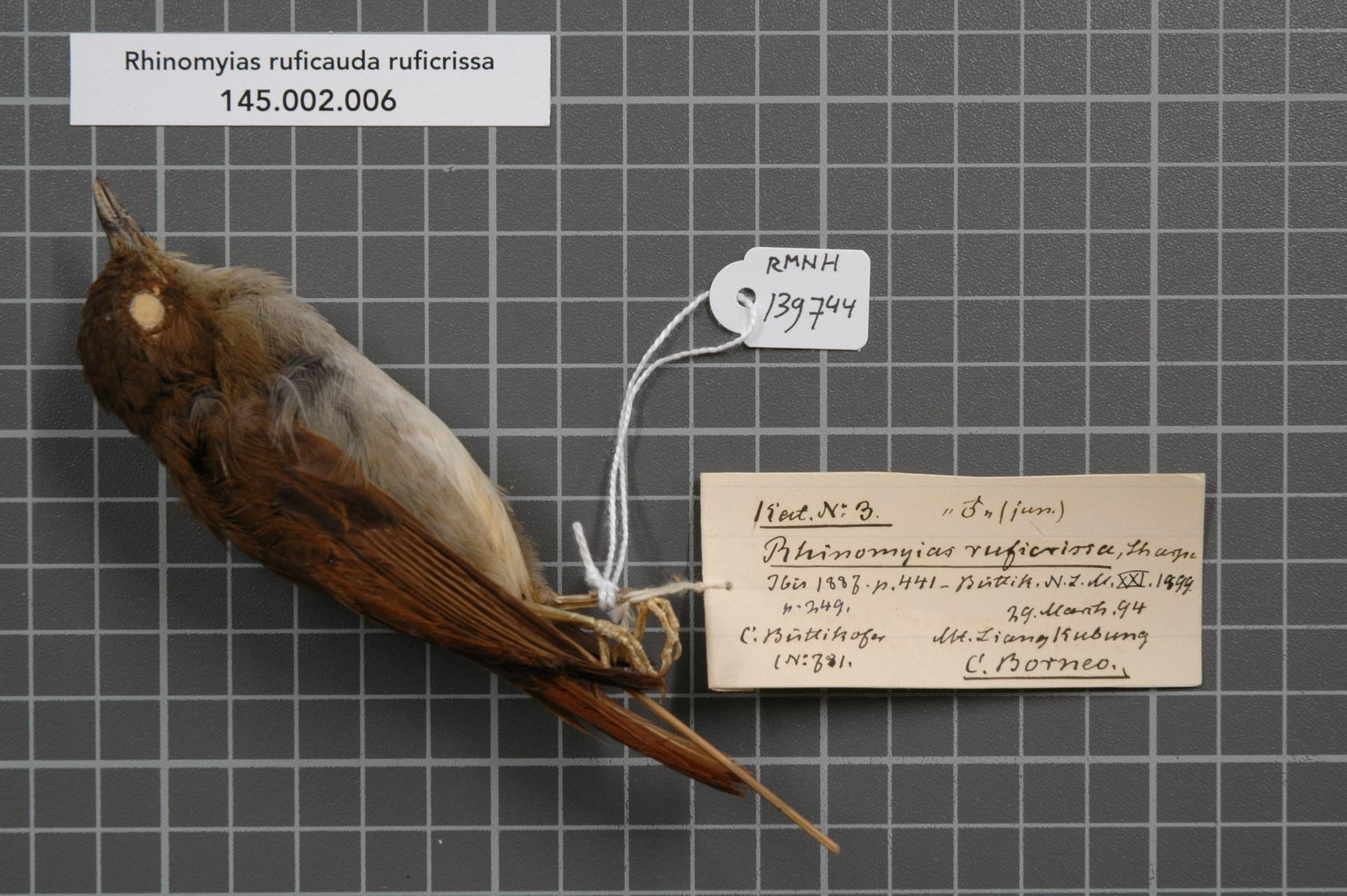
- Preserved specimen at Naturalis Biodiversity Center

Scientific classification
- Domain: Eukaryota
- Kingdom: Animalia
- Phylum: Chordata
- Class: Aves
- Order: Passeriformes
- Family: Muscicapidae
- Genus: Cyornis
- Species: C. ruficrissa

Binomial name
- Cyornis ruficrissa (Sharpe, 1887)

= Crocker jungle flycatcher =

Species of bird

The Crocker jungle flycatcher (Cyornis ruficrissa) is a species of passerine bird in the Old World flycatcher family Muscicapidae. It is endemic to Borneo. Its natural habitat is subtropical or tropical moist montane forests.

The Crocker jungle flycatcher was split from the rufous-tailed jungle flycatcher (Cyornis ruficauda) as distinct species by the IOC in 2021.
