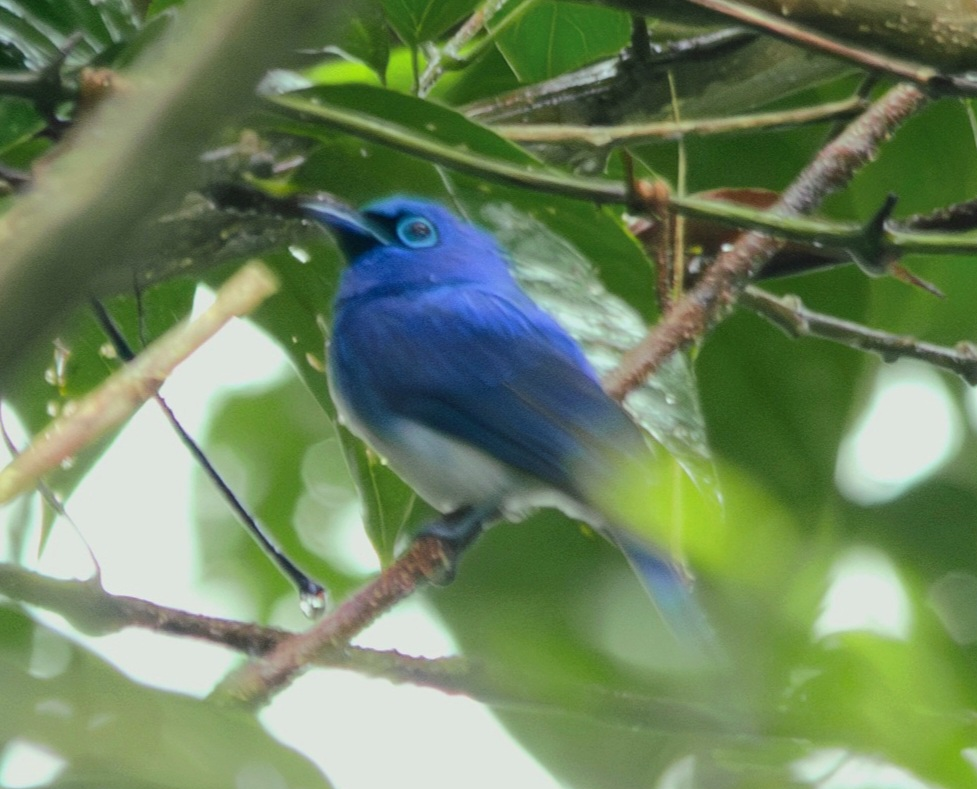
- An adult male ssp. agusanae
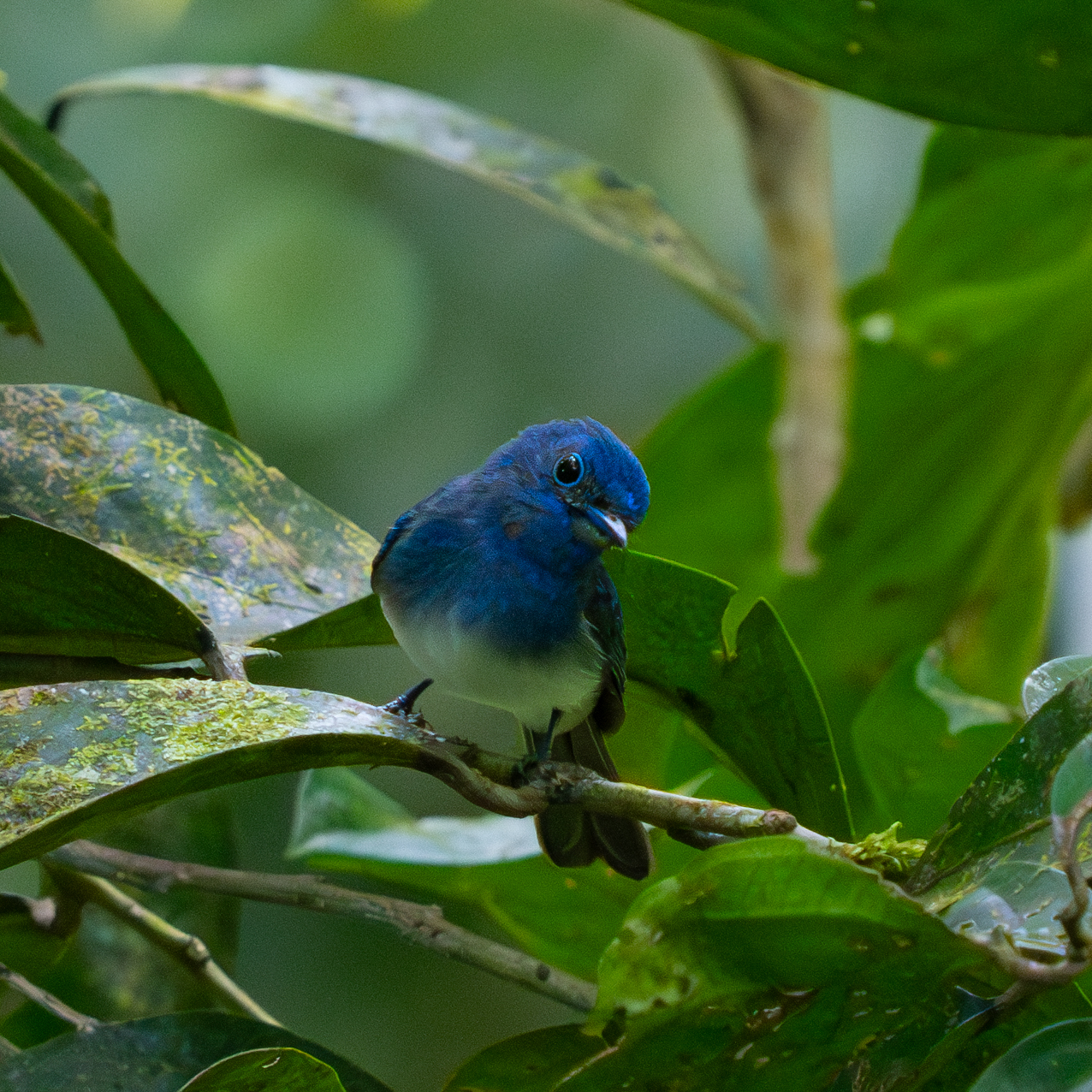
- A sub-adult male ssp. helanae which lacks the distinct black mask

Conservation status
- Near Threatened (IUCN 3.1)

Scientific classification
- Kingdom: Animalia
- Phylum: Chordata
- Class: Aves
- Order: Passeriformes
- Family: Monarchidae
- Genus: Hypothymis
- Species: H. helenae

Binomial name
- Hypothymis helenae (Steere, 1890)

Subspecies
- See text

Synonyms
- Cyanomyas [sic] Helenae

= Short-crested monarch =

Species of bird

The short-crested monarch (Hypothymis helenae) is a species of bird in the family Monarchidae and one of the most attractive of all the monarch flycatchers. It is a brilliant ultramarine blue bird with the males having a black facial markings with an electric blue eyering and a short crest contrasted with a pearly white belly. It is endemic to the Philippines found on the islands of Luzon, Camiguin Norte, Polilio, Catanduanes, Samar, Dinagat and Mindanao. It is found in tropical moist lowland forest. It is threatened by habitat loss. Along with the Celestial monarch, It is one of the most sought after birds among birdwatchers.

== Description and taxonomy ==
A small bird of lowland forest. Male is brilliant ultramarine blue and a white belly with a distinct electric blue eyering and black lores. This species exhibits sexual dimorphism - females are plainer grayish blue and have no eye ring.

It is often seen in mixed species flocks along with other birds such as Blue-headed fantail, Rufous paradise flycatcher, Sulphur-billed nuthatch and other small forest birds.

Its call is described as a series of high pitched and metallic series of 8-12 sylables in increasing loudness. It also has a raspy contact call.

Alternate names for the short-crested monarch include the paradise flycatcher monarch and short-crested blue-monarch.

=== Subspecies ===
Three subspecies are recognized:

- H. h. helenae - (Steere, 1890): Found on Luzon, Polillo Island, Catanduanes and Samar (northern Philippines)
- H. h. agusanae - Rand, 1970): Found on Dinagat Island, Siargao and eastern Mindanao (east-central and south-eastern Philippines); paler and brighter blue
- Camiguin blue-monarch (H. h. personata) or Camiguin monarch - (McGregor, 1907): Originally described as a separate species. Found on Camiguin Norte (northern Philippines)

== Ecology and behavior ==
Not much is known about its diet but it is presumed to the insectivorous. Seen singly or in pairs but is most often observed feeding with mixed species flocks with other species such as Celestial monarch, fantails, Brown tit-babbler, Rufous paradise flycatcher and other small birds.

Not much is known about its breeding behaviour. Nests made out moss, dry leaves have been found in April and May on Mindanao and June on Luzon.

== Habitat and conservation status ==
This species is poorly known, but is reported to occupy the understorey of forest below 1,000 m. It is said to be more common on smaller islands such as Camiguin but no surveys for done for it in recent years.

IUCN has assessed this bird as near threatened This species' main threat is habitat loss with wholesale clearance of forest habitats as a result of logging, agricultural conversion and mining activities occurring within the range.

Lowland forests are the most threatened type of forest in the country. This is due to them being deforested for high-value lumber and destroyed through Slash-and-burn or kaigin. Like the Celestial monarch majority of the sight records are in Mindanao in Bislig, Surigao del Sur which has faced rapid destruction in the past few years after the company that once owned a concession was closed down in 2005 and was overrun with illegal logging and converted into exotic monoculture plantations which cannot support these birds. It is otherwise rare throughout its range. This beautiful insectivore is declining rapidly. Widespread and continuing reduction of its lowland habitat leaves its population severely fragmented.
