= Pasonanca Natural Park =

Protected area in the Philippines

- IUCN category II (national park)
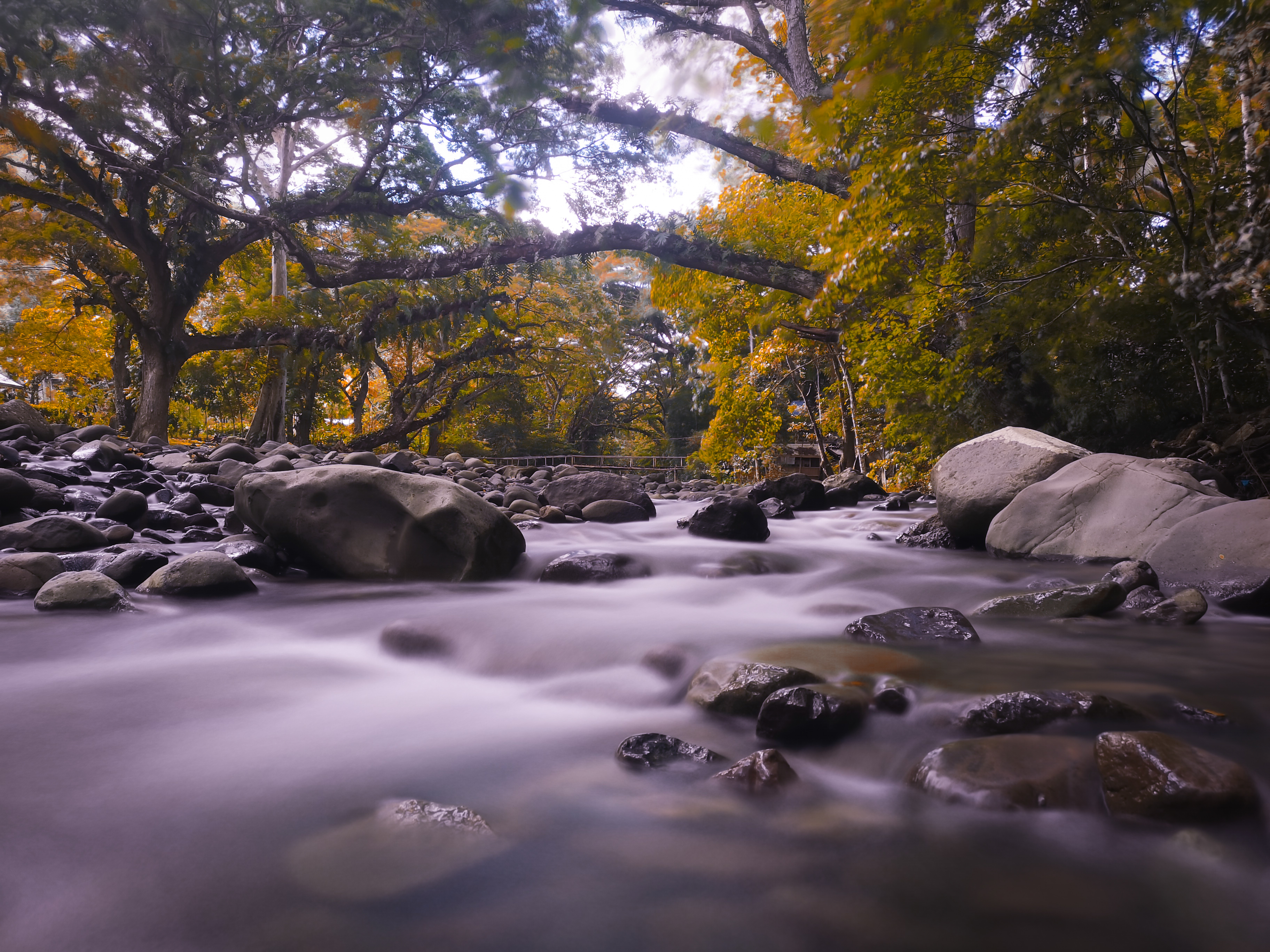

- Location within Philippines
- Location: Zamboanga del Norte and Zamboanga del Sur, Philippines
- Nearest city: Zamboanga City
- Coordinates: 7°4′15.96″N 122°4′31.8″E
- Area: 12,107 hectares (29,920 acres)
- Established: December 17, 1987 (Watershed forest reserve); July 5, 1999 (Natural park)
- Governing body: Department of Environment and Natural Resources

The Pasonanca Natural Park is a protected area that preserves a major watershed in the southern Philippine island of Mindanao in the Zamboanga Peninsula. It contains the headwaters of the Tumaga River in the southern Zamboanga Cordillera mountain range that serves the water requirements of some 800,000 residents in Zamboanga City. It was named after the village of Pasonanca located in the city's northern fringes where the Pasonanca Park, a public eco-park, and the Abong-Abong Park, a pilgrimage site, can also be found.

The natural park is managed as part of the Philippines' National Integrated Protected Areas System. It was initially established in 1987 as the Pasonanca Watershed Forest Reserve encompassing an initial area of 10,560 hectares (26,100 acres) declared through Proclamation No. 199 issued by President Corazon Aquino. In 1999, through Proclamation No. 132 issued by President Joseph Estrada, the park was enlarged and reclassified as a natural park. It has the largest remaining block of old growth lowland dipterocarp forest in Zamboanga.

On May 13, 2024, Secretary Toni Yulo-Loyzaga and Mayor John M. Dalipe led the inauguration ceremony of the Pasonanca Natural Park as the 52nd of ASEAN Heritage Parks in Sitio Canucutan, District I, Barangay Pasonanca, Zamboanga City. The park is the first old-growth dipterocarp forest in the Zamboanga Peninsula. The ASEAN Center for Biodiversity, DENRA unveiled the Park's pyramid-Philippine eagle monument, since it is the national bird's-Mindanao bleeding-heart habitat and Refugia

== Description ==
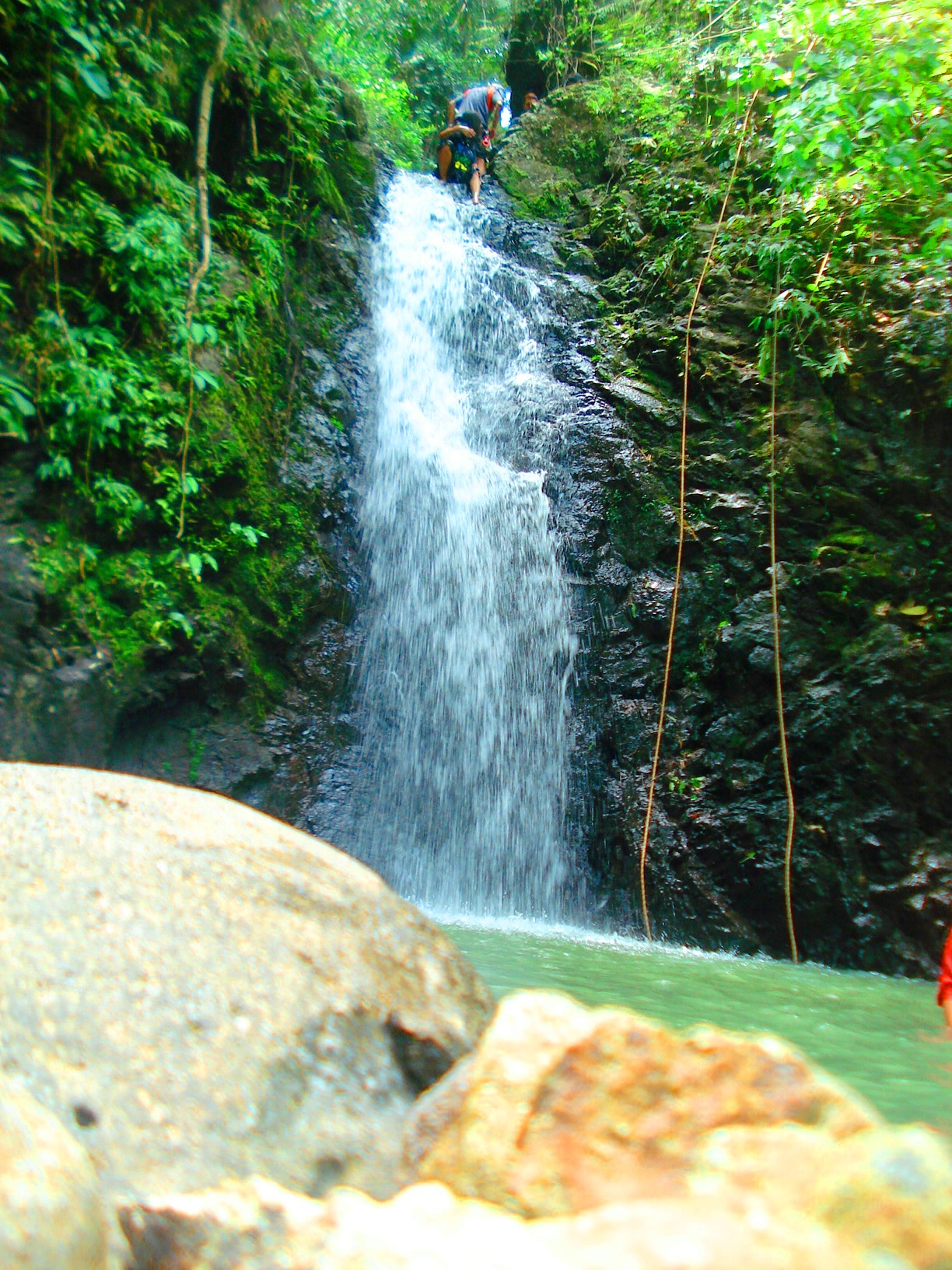
Dulian Falls

The Pasonanca Natural Park covers an area of 12,107 hectares (29,920 acres) and a buffer zone of 5,307 hectares (13,110 acres) in the southern end of the Zamboanga Cordillera mountain range that runs north to south serving as the backbone for the peninsula of Zamboanga. It is contained within the local government areas of Pasonanca, Lunzuran, Lumayang Cacao, Lapacan, Lamisan, Bungiao, La Paz, Balurno and Dulian in Zamboanga City and parts of the municipality of Sibuco in Zamboanga del Norte. Mount Pulong Bato is a prominent peak located within the park rising to 360 metres (1,180 ft). It is crossed by Tumaga River and its tributaries which serve the bulk of the water supply for the Zamboanga City Water District through a diversion dam. The park also contains several rock formations, springs and waterfalls including the Dulian Falls.

The park is composed of 60% old growth and secondary growth forests with the remaining areas devoted to agricultural lands, coconut plantations, and built up areas. It has a rolling terrain with moderate to steep slopes. Facilities within the park include a clonal nursery, four outposts, an information center and a wildlife rescue center. There are also a few resorts, a hotel, cottages and restaurants near the park's entrance in Pasonanca.

The park is located just 10 kilometres (6.2 mi) north of the Zamboanga City Proper. It is easily accessible from the Zamboanga International Airport via the Pasonanca–Santa Maria Road.

== Wildlife ==
The Pasonanca Natural Park provides a habitat to many threatened and restricted-range species of the Mindanao and Eastern Visayas Endemic Bird Area including the Zamboanga bulbul, Mindanao bleeding-heart, Philippine kingfisher, Philippine leafbird and little slaty flycatcher.

It also supports the Philippine eagle, Mindanao broadbill, azure-breasted pitta, celestial monarch, southern silvery kingfisher, blue-capped kingfisher, spotted imperial pigeon, giant scops owl, Japanese night heron, Chinese egret, rufous-lored kingfisher, Philippine dwarf kingfisher and Philippine cockatoo.

It is home to several unique reptile species, including the endemic lizard Eutropis alcalai, known only from specimens collected within its boundaries. Additionally, the park is the sole known location for the two adult specimens of the Zamboanga false gecko. The holotype of Cyrtodactylus jambangan was also discovered here, with this gecko species observed to be common in the park's pristine, low-elevation gallery forests. Other endemic reptiles found in the park include the Mindanao keelback and the Philippine small-disked frog.

The park also hosts endemic flora such as Sonerila mapelo (described in 2022, one of only three Sonerila species in the country) and Amomum zamboangense (described in 2025, one of only two Amomum species in the country), both first identified from specimens collected within the park itself.

It contains at least 18 Philippine endemic trees including the white lauan, katmon, antipolo, balakat, Celtis luzonica, Hopea acuminata, and Myristica philippensis.

== See also ==
- List of natural parks of the Philippines
