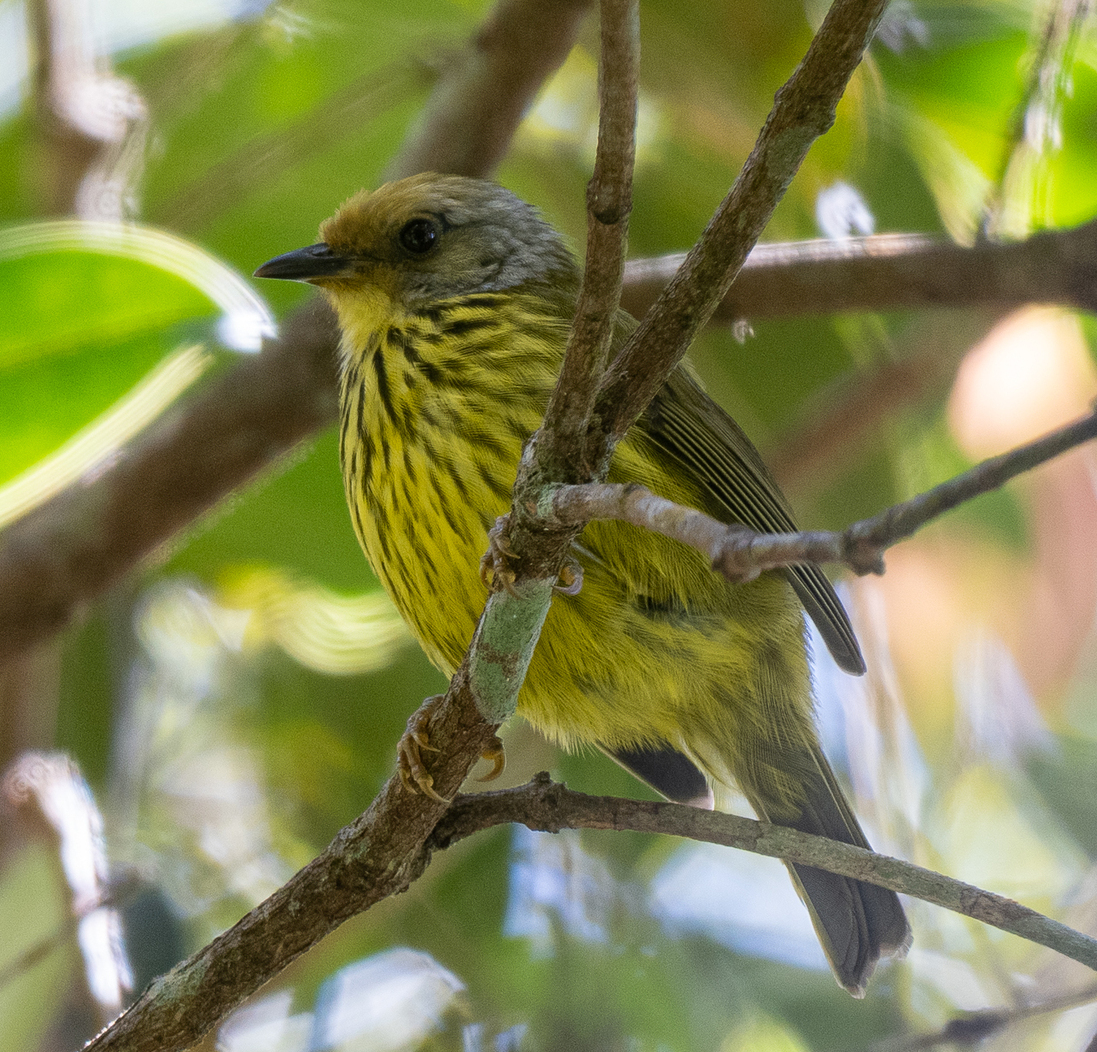

Conservation status
- Least Concern (IUCN 3.1)

Scientific classification
- Kingdom: Animalia
- Phylum: Chordata
- Class: Aves
- Order: Passeriformes
- Family: Zosteropidae
- Genus: Zosterornis
- Species: Z. hypogrammicus

Binomial name
- Zosterornis hypogrammicus (Salomonsen, 1961)

Synonyms
- Stachyris hypogrammicus

= Palawan striped babbler =

Species of bird

The Palawan striped babbler (Zosterornis hypogrammicus) is a species of bird in the family Zosteropidae. It is one of the four striped babblers along with the Negros striped babbler, Panay striped babbler and Luzon striped babbler. It is endemic to the Philippines, where it is only found in Palawan. Its natural habitat is tropical moist montane forest. It is threatened by habitat loss.

== Description ==
This is a small bird found only in the motane forests on Palawan. Its upper parts are greenish brown and has a grayish olive underparts with heavy black streaks. Has a gray face, white throat and a light reddish brown crown.

Contrary to its name, this species is closer related to White-eyes than true babblers and are in the same family as them.

It is the most distinctive among the four striped babblers (others being the Luzon striped babbler, the Panay striped babbler and the Negros striped babbler), which are generally plain brown versus the Palawan striped babbler's olive yellow markings.

== Ecology and behavior ==
The stomach contents of 2 individuals contained insects, seeds and some vegetable matter. Found singly, in pairs and small groups. Joins mixed-species feeding flocks that include Warbling white-eye, Mangrove whistler, Mountain leaf warbler and Palawan tit. Gleans dead leaves searching for food and forages in all levels of the cannopy.

Birds in breeding condition with enlarged gonads found in the months of April and May. Otherwise, no information on breeding, nest and fledgling stages.

== Habitat and conservation status ==
This species is known from primary montane mossy forest from 1,000 m to 2,000 m. It is only found on three mountains, namely Mount Mantalingajan, Mt. Victoria and Mt. Borangbato.

Despite its extremely limited range, IUCN has assessed this bird as least concern but was formerly assessed as near-threatened. This species' main threat is habitat loss with wholesale clearance of forest habitats as a result of logging, agricultural conversion and mining activities occurring within the range.The whole of Palawan was designated as a Biosphere Reserve; however, protection and enforcement of laws has been difficult and these threats still continue.
