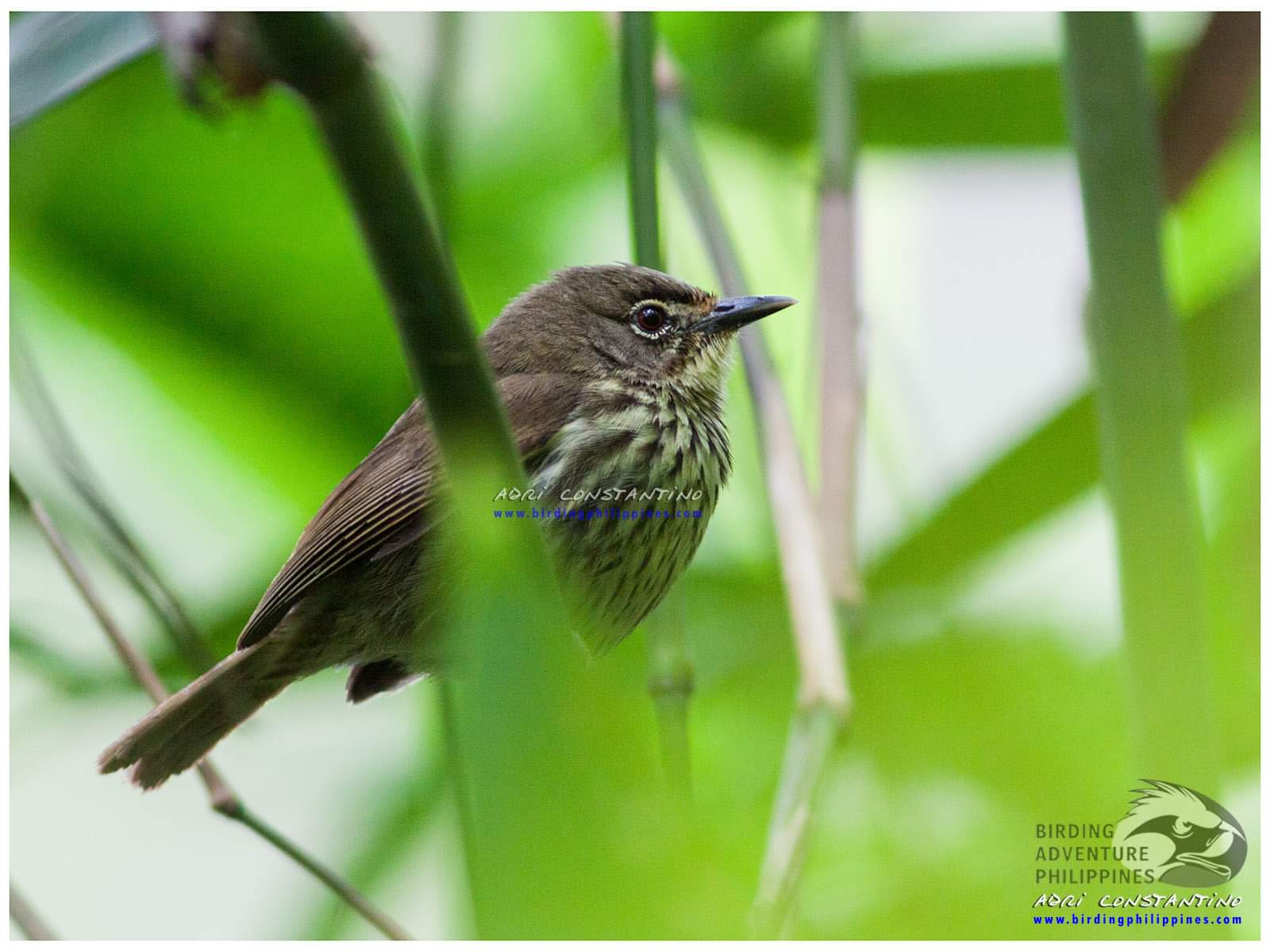

Conservation status
- Least Concern (IUCN 3.1)

Scientific classification
- Kingdom: Animalia
- Phylum: Chordata
- Class: Aves
- Order: Passeriformes
- Family: Zosteropidae
- Genus: Zosterornis
- Species: Z. striatus

Binomial name
- Zosterornis striatus Ogilvie-Grant, 1894

Synonyms
- Stachyris striatus

= Luzon striped babbler =

Species of bird

The Luzon striped babbler (Zosterornis striatus) is a species of bird in the family Zosteropidae. It is one of the four striped babblers along with the Negros striped babbler, Panay striped babbler and Palawan striped babbler. It is endemic to the Philippines, where it is only found in northern Luzon and in Bataan. Its natural habitat is tropical moist lowland forest. It is threatened by habitat loss.

== Description and taxonomy ==
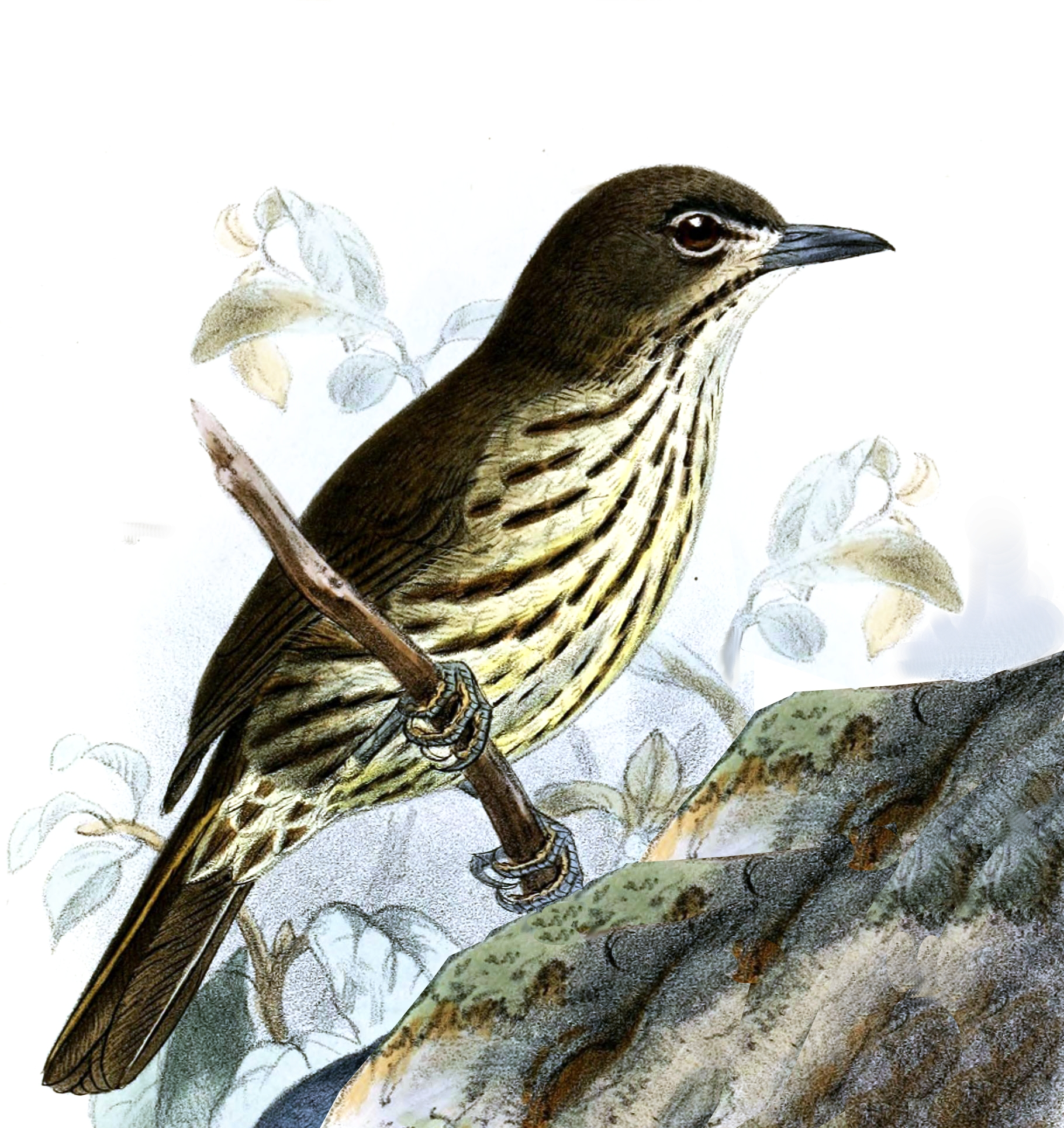
An illustration of Luzon striped-babbler

This is a small bird found in lowland and foothill forest in Luzon. It is reddish brown on the back, wings and tail and a gray head. It has a heavily streaked belly and chest and a black face with a moustace stripe. It has a white eyering. Contrary to its name, this species is closer related to White-eyes and are in the same family as them

This species does not exhibit sexual dimorphism. .

It is differentiated from the three other striped babblers namely, the Palawan striped babbler, Panay striped babbler and the Negros striped babbler, by its heavy black streaking on its belly, gray face with a distinct striped moustache and faint eyering.

== Ecology and behavior ==
Feeds on berries, small fruits and insects. Found singly, in pairs and small parties but is most often seen in mixed species flocks with other small forest birds like Golden-crowned babbler, Blue-headed fantail, Rufous paradise flycatcher, Lemon-throated leaf warbler, Yellow-wattled bulbul, white-eyes, sunbirds and flowerpeckers. Forages in all levels but is usually seen in the understorey where it methodically gleans on leaves searching for insects.

Almost nothing is known about its breeding habits. In May, two birds were seen returning to berries believed to have been feeding a chick. Otherwise, mating habits, nest and fledgling stages all completely unknown.

== Habitat and Conservation Status ==
It is found in lowland and foothill forest and overgrown disturbed areas on Luzon. It also persists in heavily degraded forest and overgrown clearings. It is primarily a bird of forest floor and understorey, although it is sometimes also found in the middle and upper storeys. It mainly occupies forest below 500 m, although in the Sierra Madre it is locally common up to 1,000 m. Interestingly, compared with the other striped babblers (Panay striped babbler, Palawan striped babbler and Negros striped babbler), which are all mid to high elevation species, the Luzon striped babbler is seen in lower lying areas.

IUCN has assessed this bird as least concern but was formerly assessed as Near-threatened with the population believed to be on the decline. This species' main threat is habitat loss with wholesale clearance of forest habitats as a result of logging, agricultural conversion and mining activities occurring within the range.

There are currently no targeted conservation plans for the species. It does occur in the protected area of Northern Sierra Madre Natural Park but protection and enforcement from loggers and hunters is still lax. It will indirectly benefit from the conservation of other North Luzon species like the Critically Endangered Isabela oriole. The stronghold of the Isabela oriole in Baggao is being proposed as a protected area and will thus preserve (on paper) key habitat for this beautiful babbler.
