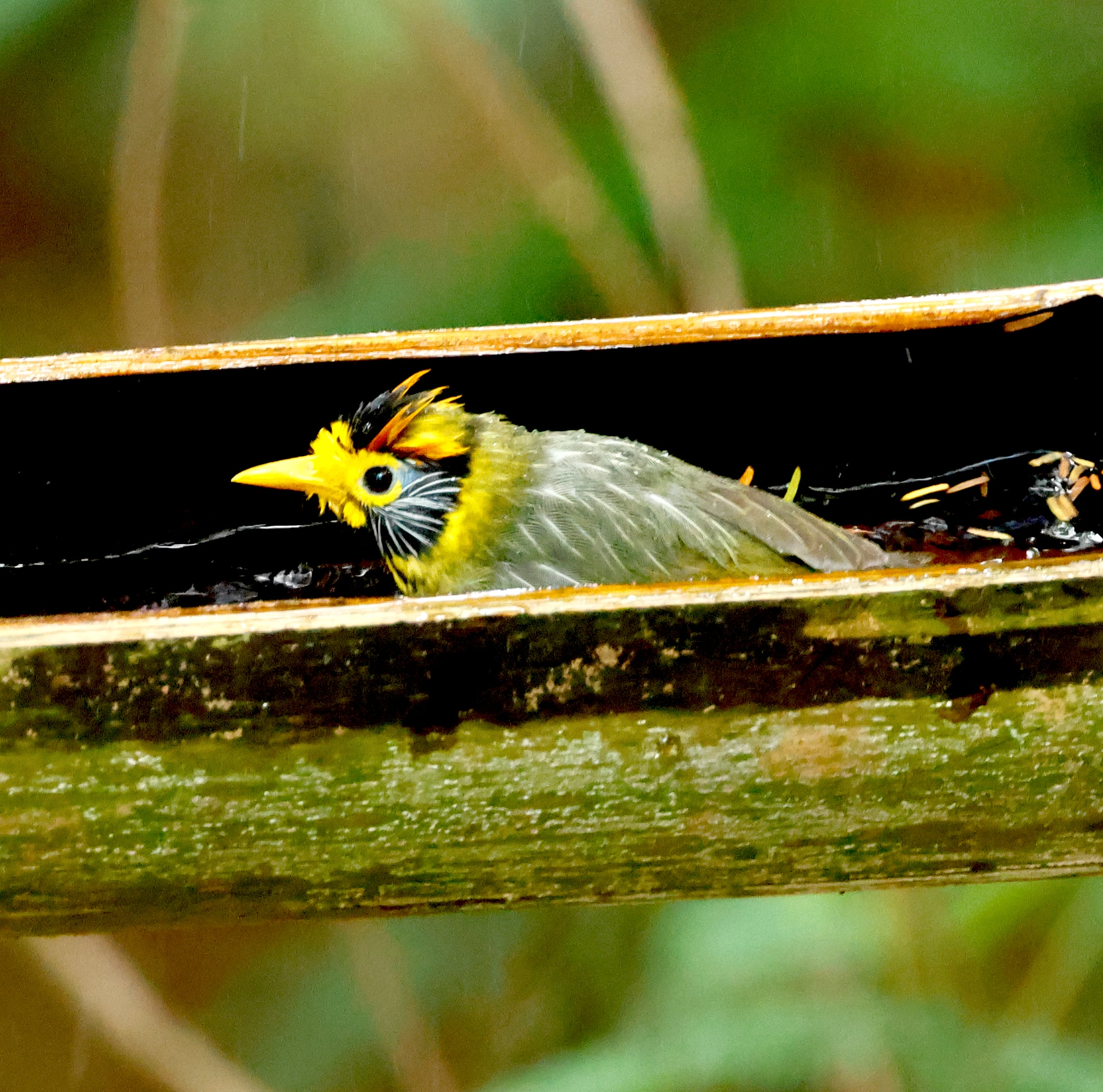
- A Flame-templed babbler on Negros Island
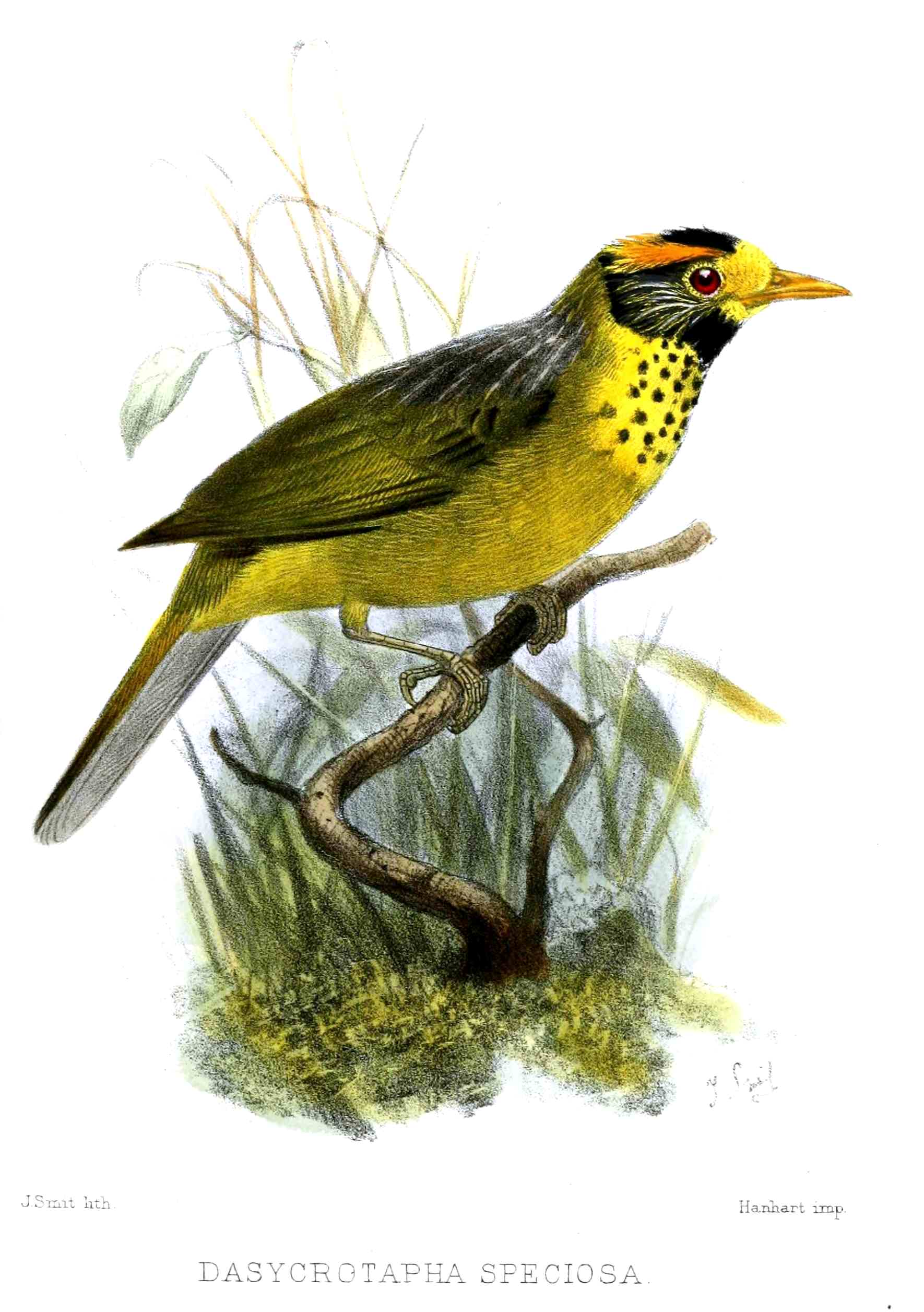
- An illustration of a Flame-templed Babbler by Joseph Smit

Conservation status
- Near Threatened (IUCN 3.1)

Scientific classification
- Kingdom: Animalia
- Phylum: Chordata
- Class: Aves
- Order: Passeriformes
- Family: Zosteropidae
- Genus: Dasycrotapha
- Species: D. speciosa

Binomial name
- Dasycrotapha speciosa Tweeddale, 1878

Synonyms
- Stachyris speciosa (Tweeddale, 1878)

= Flame-templed babbler =

Species of bird

The flame-templed babbler (Dasycrotapha speciosa) is a species of bird of the family Zosteropidae, in the genus Dasycrotapha. It is one of the most remarkable and distinctive birds with its complex head markings with orange crown tufts, black ears and yellow beak and face. It is endemic to the Philippines, where it is found on the islands of Panay and Negros. Its natural habitat is tropical moist lowland forest. It is threatened by habitat loss. Along with the Negros striped babbler, it is one of the two babbler species extremely sought after by birdwatchers on Negros.

== Description and Taxonomy ==
A small bird found in lowland and hill forest on Panay and Negros. With its complex facial and head pattern that includes white facial streaks, yellow bill, lores, forehead and chin, a black head and the eponymous bright flame brow, it is described as "remarkable" on Birds of the World. It has gray back with pale streaking, a bright yellow chest with black spots. Contrary to its name, this species is closer related to White-eyes and are in the same family as them.

Its song is described as a melodic series of 7 to 10 notes with each note getting proggresively louder. It has a soft one note contact call.

This species is monotypic and has no subspecies.

== Ecology and behavior ==
The flame-templed babbler is an omnivore feeding on small insects and berries, flowers and figs. These babblers feed and breed in understory bushes, trees, vines and ferns. Forms mixed flocks with other small birds such as the Visayan fantail, Philippine tailorbird, Lemon-throated leaf warbler, White-vented whistler and Visayan bulbul.

It seems to breed almost year round but territorial behaviour most apparent in the months of March to April.

== Habitat and conservation status ==
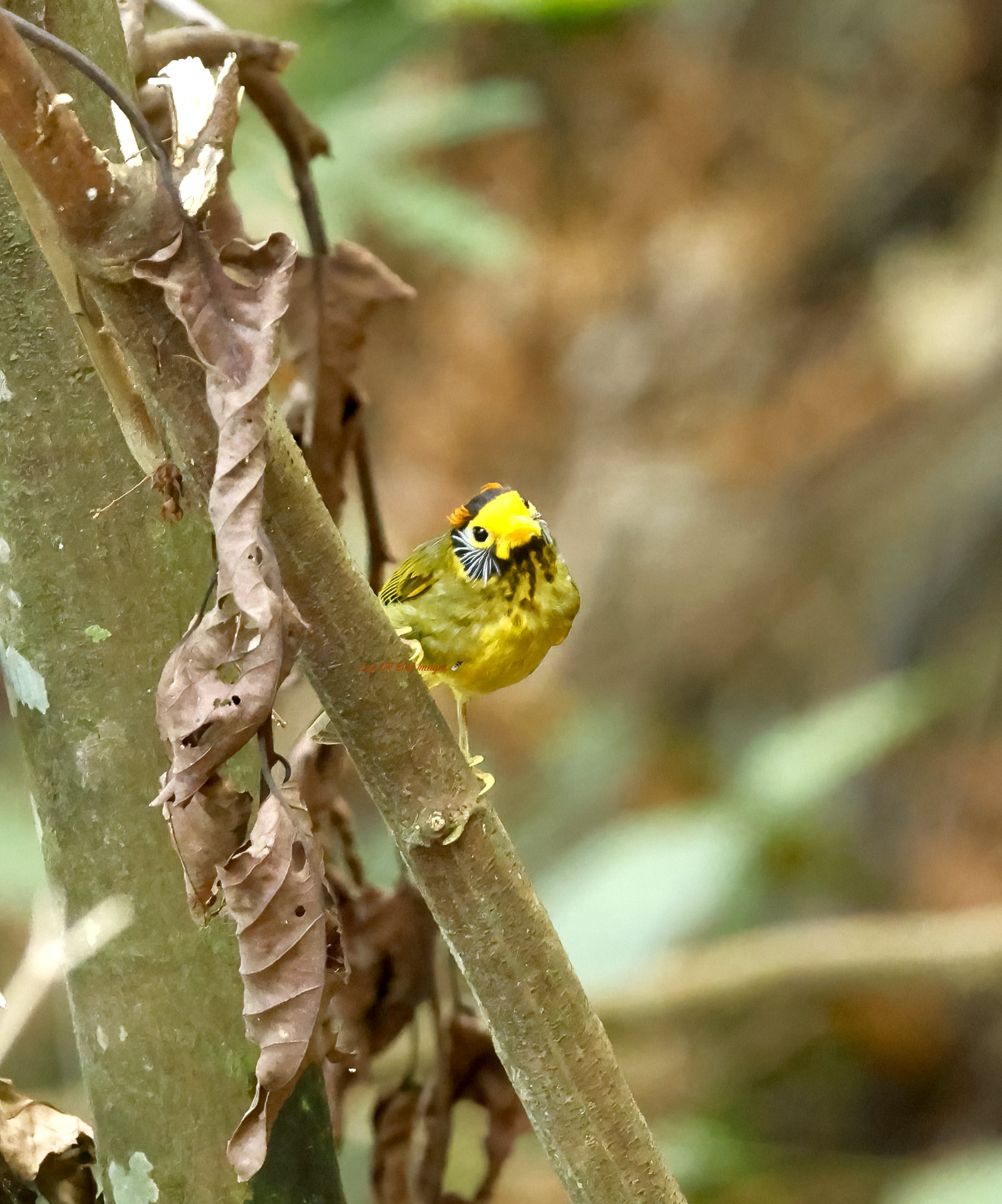
A Flame-templed babbler on Negros Island

The flame-templed babbler inhabits lowland forest, forest edge and secondary growth below 1,000 m, occasionally occurring up to 1,180 m. Highest densities have been recorded in the thick undergrowth of degraded secondary forest and observations come from the lower strata (up to 8 m) in the understory, where birds stay in deep cover and are consequently unobtrusive unless singing.

As of 2025, this species has been downlisted by the IUCN Red List to a Near-threatened species. This is not because the population has increased but rather the general belief that this bird is overlooked and not as endangered as originally thought - this species is seen in the highest densities in degraded habitat. The rate of habitat loss is now much lower and has slowed down. In areas where habitat is still good, they occur in high densities of more than 20 birds per square kilometer; however, overall remaining habitat is greatly reduced. It was only fairly recently discovered in Panay in 1987 and is only found in five localities.

This species' main threat is habitat loss with wholesale clearance of forest habitats as a result of logging, agricultural conversion and mining activities occurring within the range. Negros Island is one of the most deforested areas in the country due to its sugar industry and logging with most of its forests being totally lost before the 21st century. Forest cover on Negros and Panay is just 3% and 6% respectively and these figures are still declining.

It occurs in a few protected areas within Mt. Kanlaon Natural Park and Northern Negros Natural Park; however, protection and enforcement against deforestation is lax. It also occurs in the proposed Central Panay Mountain Range Park which contains the largest block of remaining forest in the Western Visayas, and the tourist destination of Twin Lakes (Mount Talinis). Both sites benefit from conservation funding but are still under threat by deforestation.
