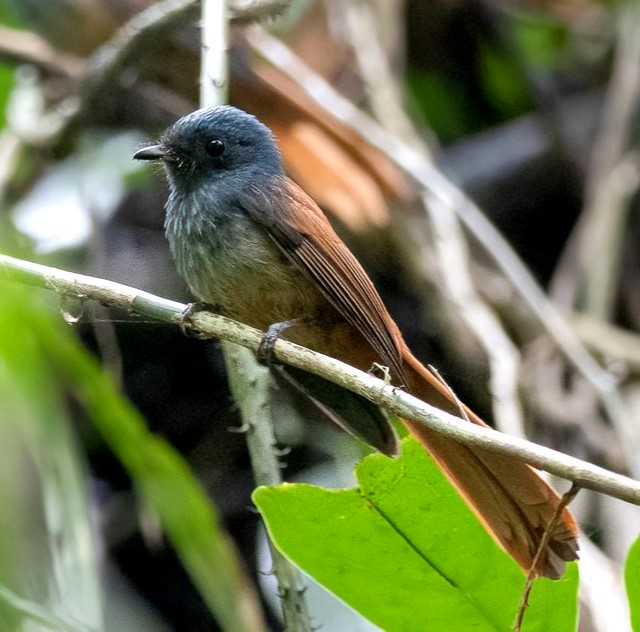

Conservation status
- Vulnerable (IUCN 3.1)

Scientific classification
- Kingdom: Animalia
- Phylum: Chordata
- Class: Aves
- Order: Passeriformes
- Family: Rhipiduridae
- Genus: Rhipidura
- Species: R. sauli

Binomial name
- Rhipidura sauli Bourns & Worcester, 1894
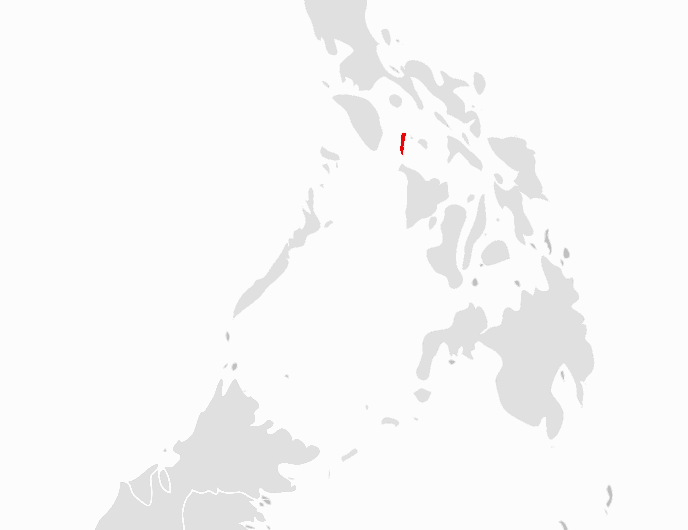
- native range

= Tablas fantail =

Species of bird

The Tablas fantail (Rhipidura sauli) is a fantail endemic to the Philippines on Tablas Island. Until recently, it was considered conspecific with the blue-headed fantail and Visayan fantail. It is threatened by habitat loss.

== Description and taxonomy ==
It was formerly deemed conspecific with the blue-headed and Visayan fantails but it is differentiated from them by its darker brown belly, longer wings, lower pitched calls, and a stronger rufous wingpanel connecting to its back.

This species is monotypic and it has no subspecies.

== Ecology and behavior ==
The diet of the Tablas fantail consists of insects. It is often observed in mixed flocks with other birds such as rufous paradise flycatcher, black-naped monarch, white-vented whistler and other small forest birds.

Barely anything is known about this species' breeding behaviour. Young birds are seen in late March. Breeding habits are presumed to be similar to that of the blue-headed fantail which nests in a small cup made of plant fibers, roots and moss and lays 2 cream colored eggs with gray spots and blotches.

== Habitat and conservation status ==
The species inhabits tropical moist lowland primary forest in areas with mature closed-canopy forest. It is believed to be less tolerant to habitat disturbances compared to its close relatives, the blue-headed fantail and Visayan fantail.

The IUCN Red List classifies this bird as vulnerable with population estimates of 2,500 to 9,999 mature individuals. This species' main threat is habitat loss with wholesale clearance of forest habitats as a result of legal and illegal logging, and conversion into farmlands through Slash-and-burn and other methods. The species does not occur at high density even within the little remaining forest cover on Tablas.

Mt Palaupau serves as a watershed for Tablas Island.

There are no ongoing species specific conservation programs but proposed conservation actions include more species surveys to better understand its habitat and population, the initiation of education and awareness campaigns to raise the species' profile and instill pride in locals, besides lobbying for protection of remaining forest and assessment of the feasibility of reforestation projects.
