= Mount Silay =

Volcano on Negros Island, Philippines

Highest point
- Elevation: 1,535 m (5,036 ft)
- Prominence: 757 m (2,484 ft)
- Coordinates: 10°46′N 123°14′E

Geography
- Location: Negros Island, Visayas, Philippines

Geology
- Mountain type: Stratovolcano
- Last eruption: Holocene

Mount Silay is a stratovolcano and potentially active volcano located on Negros Island, in the Visayas area of the central Philippines. It is located inside the Northern Negros Natural Park. The area is accessible through the Silay−Lantawan Road.

== See also ==
- List of potentially active volcanoes in the Philippines
- Philippine Institute of Volcanology and Seismology
- List of active volcanoes in the Philippines
- List of inactive volcanoes in the Philippines
- Mount Mandalagan
- Northern Negros Natural Park
