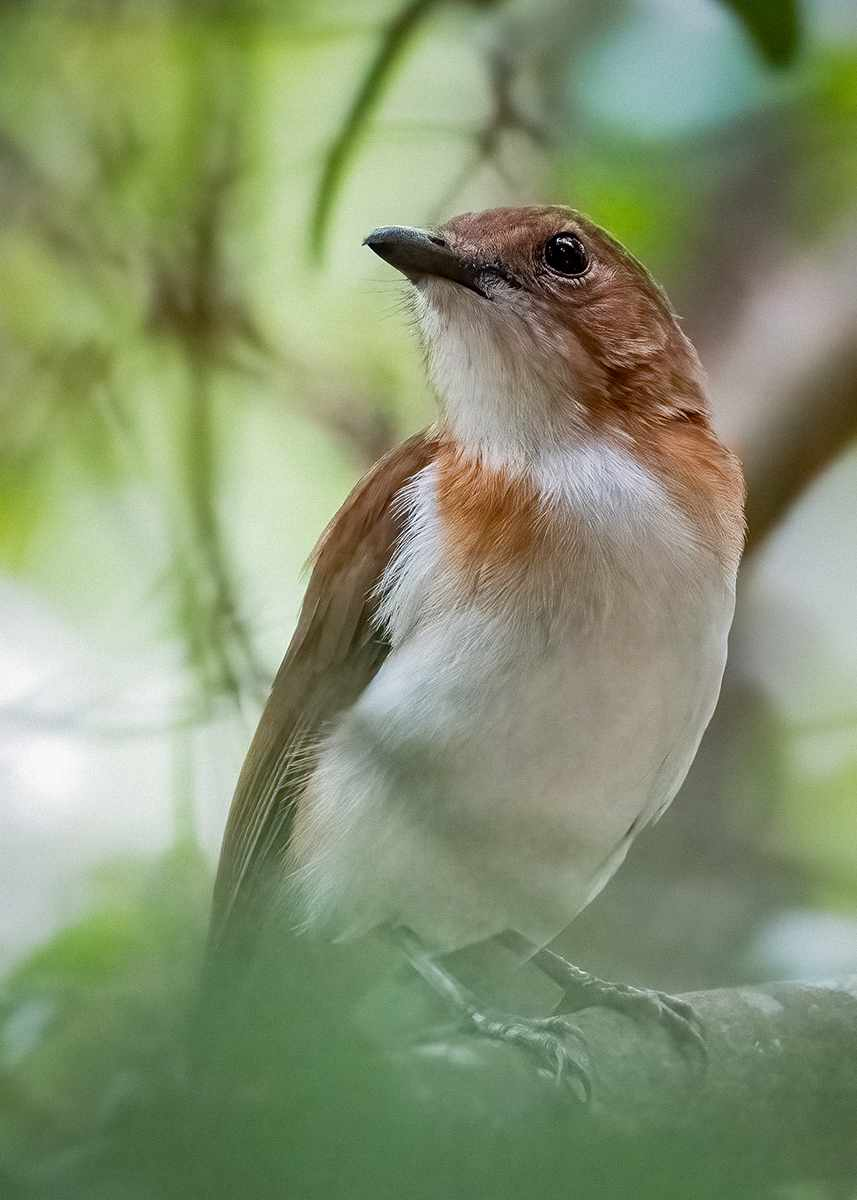
- Nominate subspecies

Conservation status
- Least Concern (IUCN 3.1)

Scientific classification
- Kingdom: Animalia
- Phylum: Chordata
- Class: Aves
- Order: Passeriformes
- Family: Pachycephalidae
- Genus: Pachycephala
- Species: P. homeyeri

Binomial name
- Pachycephala homeyeri (Blasius, W., 1890)

Subspecies
- See text

Synonyms
- Hyloterpe Homeyeri; Pachycephala grisola homeyeri; Pachycephala homeyerei

= White-vented whistler =

Species of bird

The white-vented whistler (Pachycephala homeyeri) is a species of bird in the family Pachycephalidae. It is found in the southern Philippines and a few islands of Malaysia. Its natural habitats are tropical moist lowland forest and tropical moist montane forest.

== Description and taxonomy ==
The alternate name 'white-bellied whistler' should not be confused with the species of the same name, Pachycephala leucogastra. Formerly, some authorities considered the white-vented whistler to be a subspecies of the mangrove whistler.

=== Subspecies ===
Three subspecies are recognized:

- P. h. homeyeri – (Blasius, W., 1890): Found in the Sulu Archipelago and Basilan; Sipadan and Pandanan Islands, off eastern Sabah (Malaysia)
- P. h. major – (Bourns & Worcester, 1894): Found on Cebu (Philippines)
- P. h. winchelli – (Bourns & Worcester, 1894): Originally described as a separate species. Found in Tablas, Sibuyan, Masbate, Ticao, Panay, Gigantes, Pan de Azucar, Negros

== Ecology and behavior ==
Forages in the understory for insects and often joins mixed-species flocks that include Lemon-throated leaf warbler, Visayan fantail, Flame-templed babbler, white-eyes and other small birds. Adults with enlarged gonads from January to May, breeding recorded in September. No other information about breeding.

== Habitat and conservation status ==
This species habitat is primary and secondary forest up to 2,000 meters above sea level.

IUCN has assessed this bird as least-concern species. However, its habitat in the Philippines continues to be deforested throughout the country due to slash and burn farming, mining, illegal logging and habitat conversion.

It is found in multiple protected areas such as Central Cebu Protected Landscape, Mount Kanlaon and Northern Negros Natural Park but like all areas in the Philippines, protection is lax and deforestation continues despite this protection on paper.
