= Carl Constantin Platen =

German scientist

Carl Constantin Platen (24 September 1843, Stralsund – 29 June 1899, Barth) was a German physician and zoological collector of birds and butterflies.

After his medical profession in Amoy in the Chinese Empire Carl Constantin Platen worked as a zoological collector. Between 1878 and 1894 with his wife Margarete he undertook extensive journeys, which led him in 1878 to south Celebes, in 1880 to Borneo, in 1881 Seram, in late 1881 and 1882 to Ambon, 1884/1885 to Celebes, 1887 to the Sulu islands and after to Palawan, 1889 to Mindanao and 1892/1894 to Mindoro. The yield, which consisted of 728 specimens of 141 bird taxa, gathered on these expeditions was acquired mostly by Platens friend Wilhelm Blasius for the natural history museum in Braunschweig. A further part was sold to the natural history dealer Wilhelm Schlüter in Saale. Platen was nearly blind and deaf, when he returned to Germany in 1894 where he lived in Mecklenburg-Western Pomerania until his death in 1899.

== Legacy ==
Bird taxa named in Platen's honour include Aramidopsis plateni, Dasycrotapha plateni, Gallicolumba platenae, Sterrhoptilus plateni, Prioniturus platenae, Ficedula platenae and Thapsinillas longirostris platenae. Butterflies named for him are Euploea platenae, Amathuxidia plateni, Amblypodia plateni, Charaxes platenae, Chionaema plateni, Choaspes plateni, Danaus plateni, Prothoe plateni and Troides plateni.
