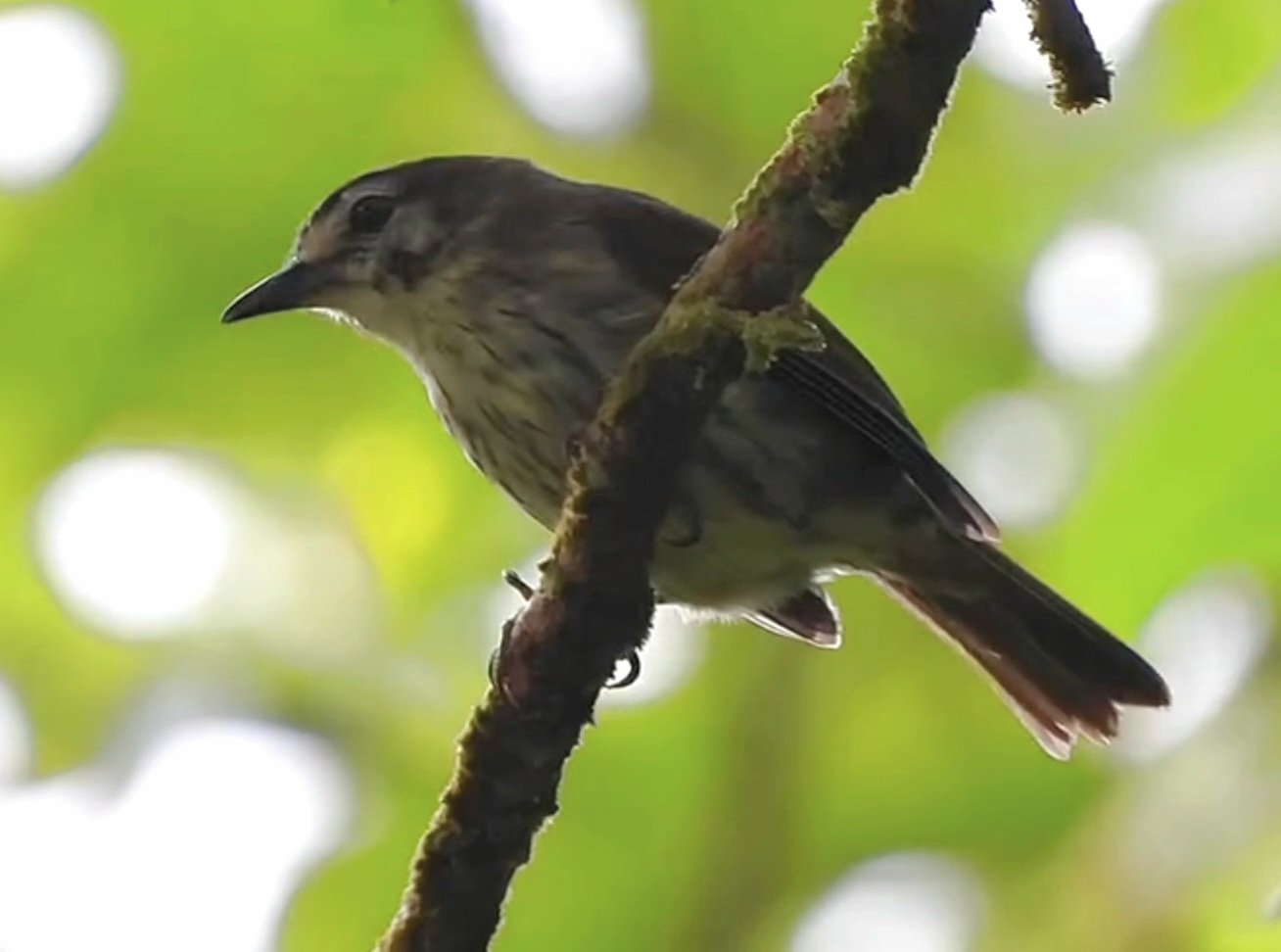

Conservation status
- Endangered (IUCN 3.1)

Scientific classification
- Kingdom: Animalia
- Phylum: Chordata
- Class: Aves
- Order: Passeriformes
- Family: Zosteropidae
- Genus: Zosterornis
- Species: Z. nigrorum

Binomial name
- Zosterornis nigrorum (Rand & Rabor, 1952)

Synonyms
- Stachyris nigrorum

= Negros striped babbler =

Species of bird

The Negros striped babbler (Zosterornis nigrorum) is a species of bird in the family Zosteropidae. It is endemic to Negros Island in the Philippines. Its natural habitat is tropical moist montane forest in the range of 900–1,600 masl. It is threatened by habitat loss.

== Description and taxonomy ==
This is a small bird found only in the motane forests on Negros. Light brown on its upperparts and has a clean underparts with fine black streaking. it has a white throat and a bold facial markings outlining its ear.

Contrary to its name, this species is closer related to White-eyes than true babblers and are in the same family as them.

It looks extremely similar to the closely related Panay striped babbler, with the differences being that the Negros striped babbler has more light and finely streaked underparts, a more distinct mask and overall lighter appearance.

== Ecology and behavior ==
Feeds on insects and small fruits. Found singly, in pairs or even large groups of 20 individuals, an unverified report more than 50 individuals seen. Joins mixed-species feeding flocks that include Visayan bulbul, Visayan fantail, Warbling white-eye, Mountain leaf warbler and Elegant tit. Gleans food from the understorey and bushes, sometimes reaching heights of 20 meters in the canopy, particularly around dusk. Also searches among dead foliage, including on banana plants. A juvenile was seen in September and birds with enlarged gonads were found in November and December, but little else is known about its nesting behavior.

== Habitat and conservation status ==
It inhabits montane forest between 950 and 1,600 m, chiefly occurring between 1,050 and 1,400 m, generally favouring the lower storey. It seems to tolerate degraded habitats, having been recorded in recently degraded forest, secondary forest and dense bushes at the forest edge and in forest opened up for agriculture. However, it appears to be limited to areas with some remaining forest cover.

IUCN has assessed this bird as Endangered. This species' main threat is habitat loss with wholesale clearance of forest habitats as a result of logging, agricultural conversion and mining activities occurring within the range. By 1988, Negros only had 4% forest cover remaining and reached 1,250 m on Mt. Talinis, one of its key habitats. Among the other four striped babblers (Panay striped babbler, Palawan striped babbler and Luzon striped babbler), this bird is the most endangered with population being estimated to be just 600 - 1,700 individuals. This is due to Negros Island being one of the most deforested islands in the country and thus has a lack of suitable habitat.

The Mount Talinis /Balinsasayao Twin Lakes Natural Park area has been proposed for conservation funding. This area includes about 40 km^{2} of high-altitude forest, which affords indirect protection through the Negros Geothermal Reservation. Environmental awareness campaigns have been conducted near Mount Talinis itself. Mount Kanlaon is also a protected area if the babbler still persists there.
