= Northern Negros Natural Park =

Protected area in the Philippines

- IUCN category II (national park)
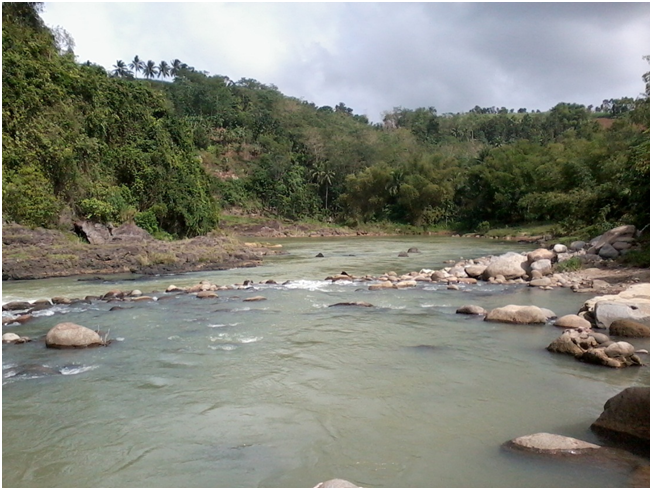
- Himoga-an River in Sagay, part of the Northern Negros Natural Park

- Location within Philippines
- Location: Negros Occidental, Philippines
- Nearest city: Bacolod
- Coordinates: 10°38′00″N 123°13′00″E
- Area: 80,454.5 hectares (198,807 acres)
- Established: April 28, 1935 (Forest reserve); August 15, 2005 (Natural park)
- Governing body: Department of Environment and Natural Resources

The Northern Negros Natural Park is a protected area of the Philippines located in the northern mountainous forest region of the island of Negros in the Visayas. It is spread over five municipalities and six cities in the province of Negros Occidental and is the province's largest watershed and water source for seventeen municipalities and cities including the Bacolod metropolitan area. The park was established first as a forest reserve spanning 107,727 hectares (266,200 acres) on 28 April 1935 through Administrative Act No. 789 signed by Governor-General Frank Murphy. On 7 August 1946, the Northern Negros Forest Reserve was reduced to its present area of 80,454.5 hectares (198,807 acres) with the signing of Proclamation No. 798 by President Manuel Roxas. In 2005, the protected area was converted into a natural park under the National Integrated Protected Areas System (NIPAS) Act by virtue of Proclamation No. 895 signed by President Gloria Arroyo.

== Geography ==
The Northern Negros Natural Park is located some 40 kilometres (25 mi) east-northeast of Bacolod, the largest city and capital of Negros Occidental. It covers the highland interior of the island and spans the cities and municipalities of Murcia, Salvador Benedicto, Talisay, Silay, Enrique B. Magalona, Victorias, Cadiz, Sagay, Toboso, Calatrava and San Carlos near the boundary with the province of Negros Oriental. The park is centered on Mount Mandalagan and Mount Silay with their old-growth forests at over 1,000 metres (3,300 ft). Secondary forests are found in the lower slopes which are crossed by four major river systems namely, the Malogo, Imbang, Himoga-an and Bago rivers.

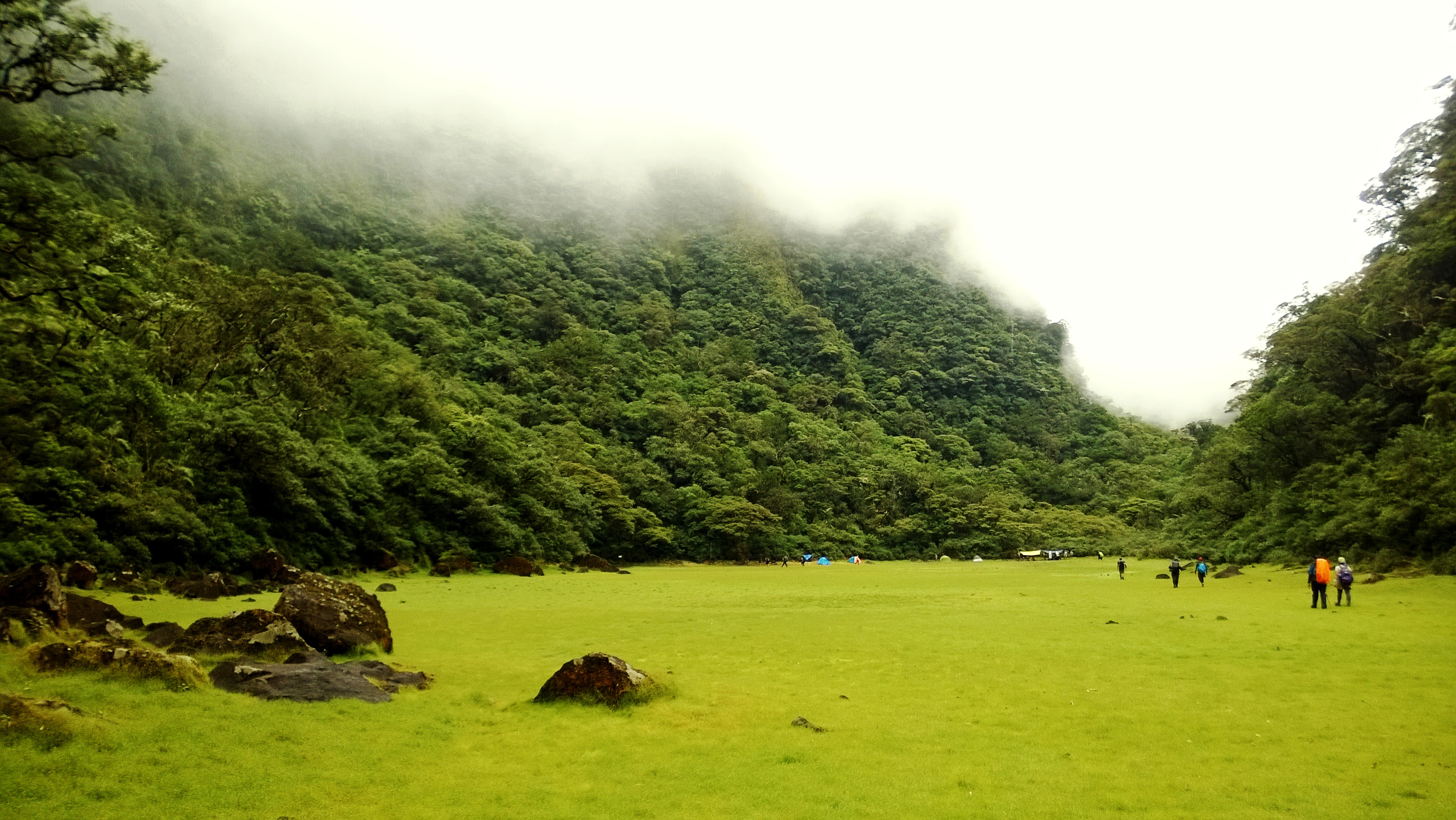
A caldera in Mount Mandalagan.

With a total area of 80,454.5 hectares (198,807 acres), only 16,687 hectares (41,230 acres) of forest remains of which seventy-five percent is primary old-growth and twenty-five percent is secondary. Forty-eight percent of the park is occupied by human dominated landscape with 40,133 hectares (99,170 acres) of agricultural lands and 512 hectares (1,270 acres) of residential areas.

== Biodiversity ==
The park belongs to the Negros–Panay Biogeographic Region. It is one of two remaining lowland forests on Negros island, the other being in the Dumaguete watershed area in Mount Talinis on the southern end of the island in Negros Oriental.

The park is a habitat to important fauna including the Visayan spotted deer, Visayan warty pig, Philippine naked-backed fruit bat, and the endangered Negros shrew.

Number of endemic and threatened species of birds have been documented in the park, which includes the Visayan hornbill, Negros bleeding-heart, white-winged cuckooshrike, flame-templed babbler, white-throated jungle flycatcher, Visayan flowerpecker, Yellow-faced flameback, Negros striped babbler and green-faced parrotfinch.

Flora documented within the park include hardwood tree species (Dipterocarps), as well as palms, orchids, herbs and trees with medicinal value. Very rare is the local species of the cycas tree (locally called pitogo), probably a Cycas vespertilio. Another prehistoric flora is present in the park like the tree ferns and the also protected Agathis philippinensis, (locally known as almaciga).

== Recent events ==
In May 2014, officials of the municipality of Salvador Benedicto submitted a proposal to the Department of Environment and Natural Resources for conversion of 500 hectares (1,200 acres) of the park within the municipality into alienable and disposable land and to open the area for investors and tourists. Salvador Benedicto is considered the "Summer Capital of Negros Occidental" where pine trees line its main highway and where two-thirds of the entire town is within the natural park. Negros Occidental Representative Julio Ledesma IV also filed a bill seeking to create a 200-hectare townsite from the proposed 500-hectare government property. However, Governor Alfredo Marañon was opposed to the idea of encroaching into the protected area and instead offered converting areas in the municipal proper into a townsite.

== See also ==
- List of natural parks of the Philippines
