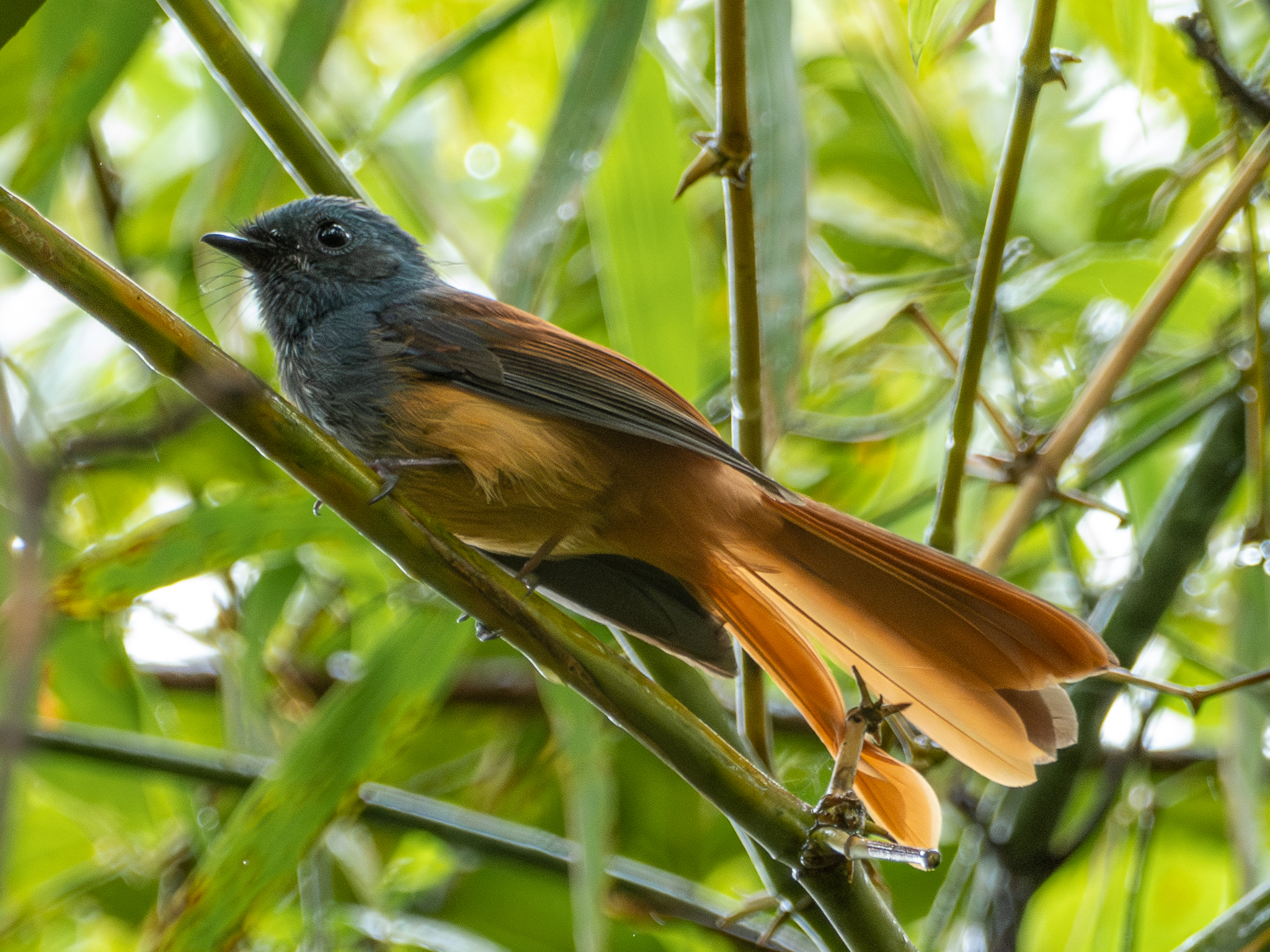

Conservation status
- Least Concern (IUCN 3.1)

Scientific classification
- Kingdom: Animalia
- Phylum: Chordata
- Class: Aves
- Order: Passeriformes
- Family: Rhipiduridae
- Genus: Rhipidura
- Species: R. cyaniceps

Binomial name
- Rhipidura cyaniceps (Cassin, 1855)

= Blue-headed fantail =

Species of bird

The blue-headed fantail (Rhipidura cyaniceps) is a fantail endemic to the northern Philippines where it is found on the islands of Luzon and Catanduanes. Until recently, it was considered conspecific with the Tablas fantail and Visayan fantail.

== Description and taxonomy ==
Forms a species complex with the Tablas fantail and Visayan fantail. It is differentiated through molecular studies, voice, solid blue chest without shaft streaks and brown belly.

=== Subspecies ===
Two subspecies are recognized:

- R. c. cyaniceps – Found on Northwest Luzon down to the Bataan Peninsula
- R. c. pinicola– Northeast Luzon to the Bicol Peninsula and Catanduanes; slightly paler and smaller

The two subspecies are poorly differentiated and may possibly be invalid - more study is required.

== Ecology and behavior ==
Forages in the understory for insects and often joins mixed-species flocks that include Golden-crowned babbler, Lemon-throated leaf warbler, Black-crowned babbler Little pied flycatcher, Turquoise flycatcher, Negros leaf warbler and other small birds. Not much known about its breeding information but breeding season is believed to in February to May, in line with most other Philippine forest birds.

== Habitat and conservation status ==
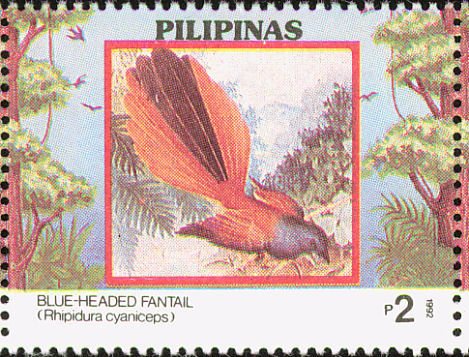
A Philippine Postage Stamp from 1992

Its natural habitats are tropical moist lowland forest and tropical moist montane forest up to 2,000 meters above sea level, it is seen in a wide array of forest types from lowland Dipterocarpus forests and montane pine, oak and laurel forest. The IUCN has classified the species as being of Least Concern where it is said to be locally common and the population is believed to be stable due to its general adaptability and tolerance for degraded forest.

It is found in multiple protected areas such as Mount Banahaw, Mount Makiling, Mount Isarog, Bataan National Park and Northern Sierra Madre Natural Park but like all areas in the Philippines, protection is lax and deforestation and hunting continues despite this protection on paper.

== Gallery ==
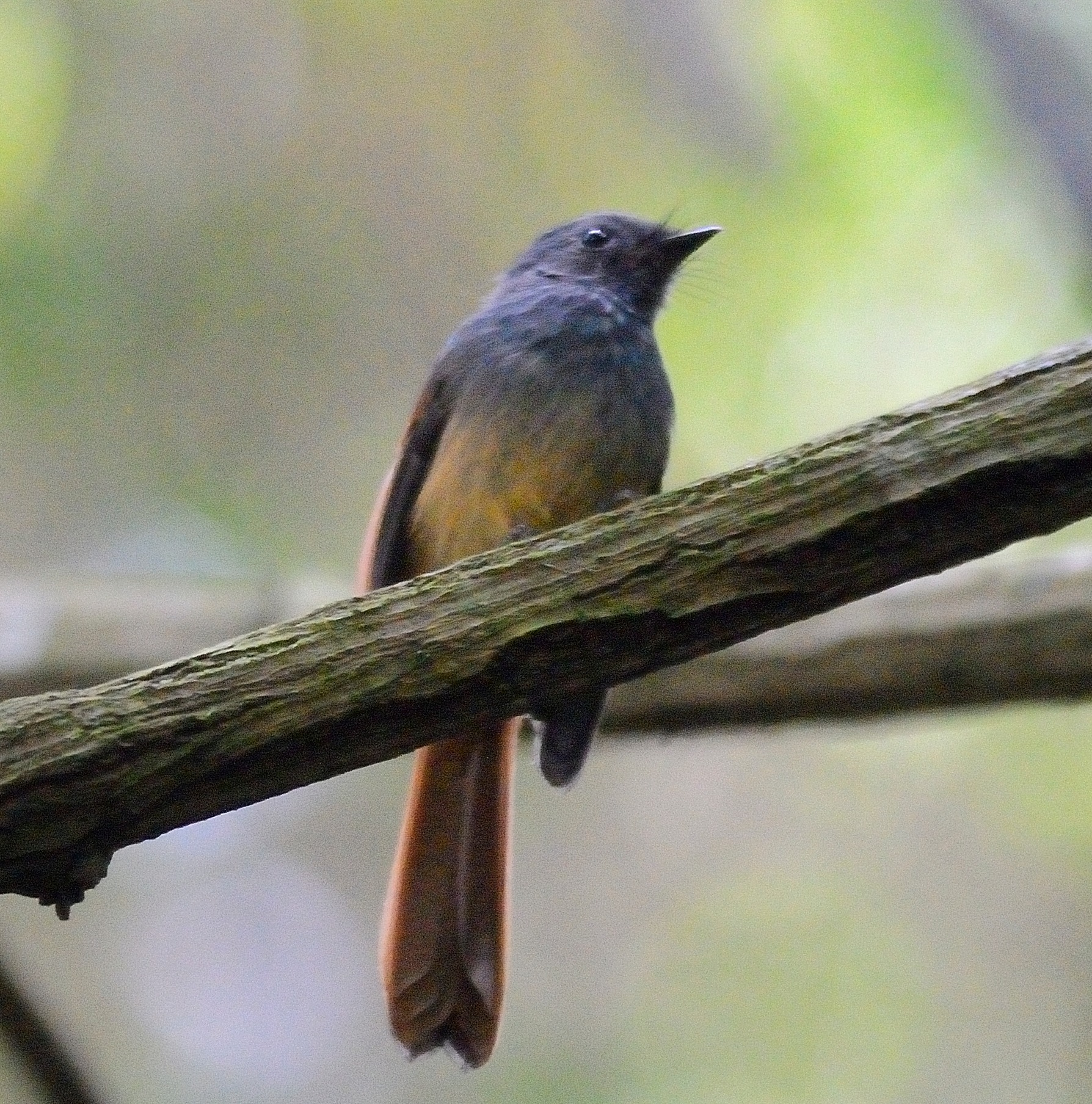

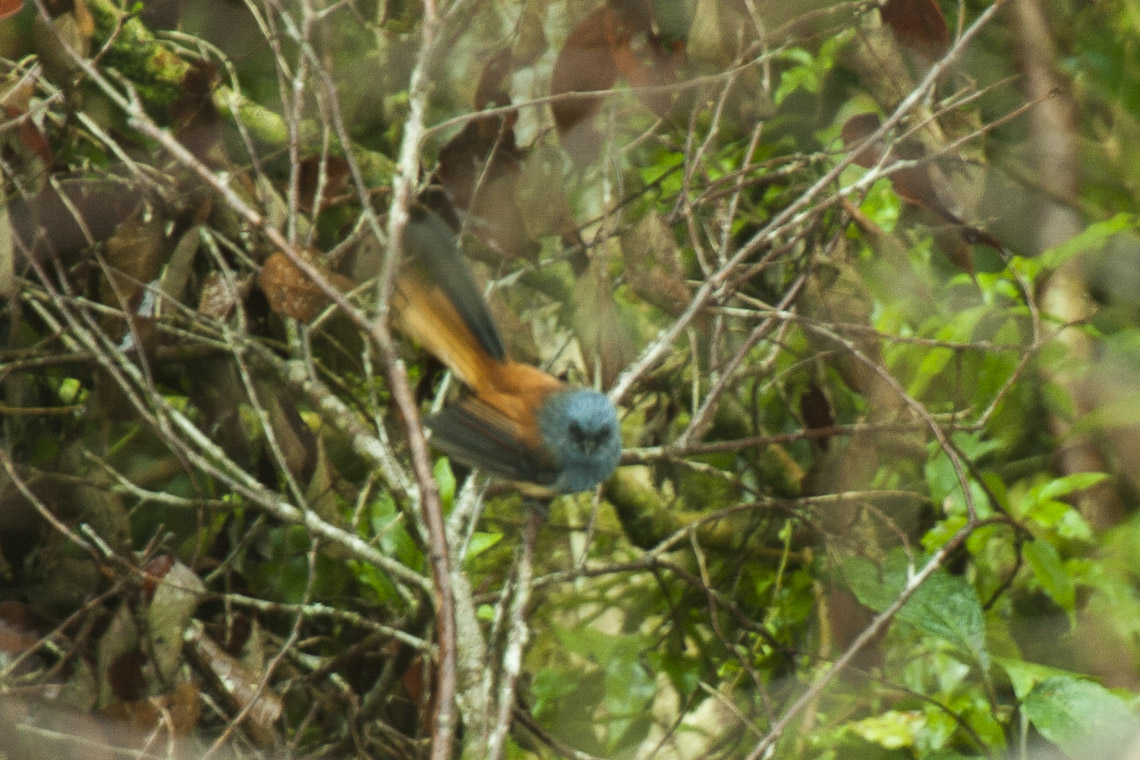

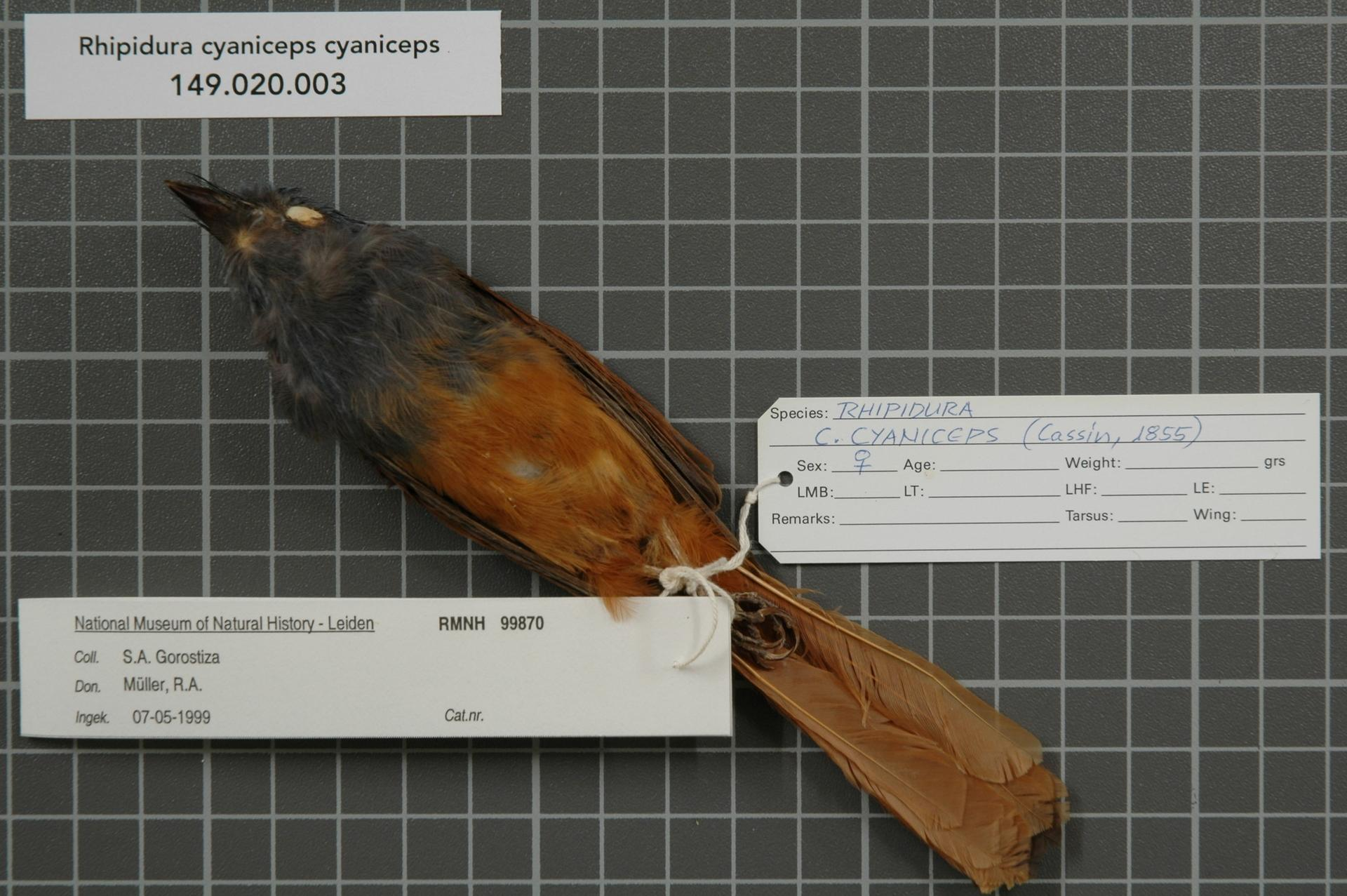
