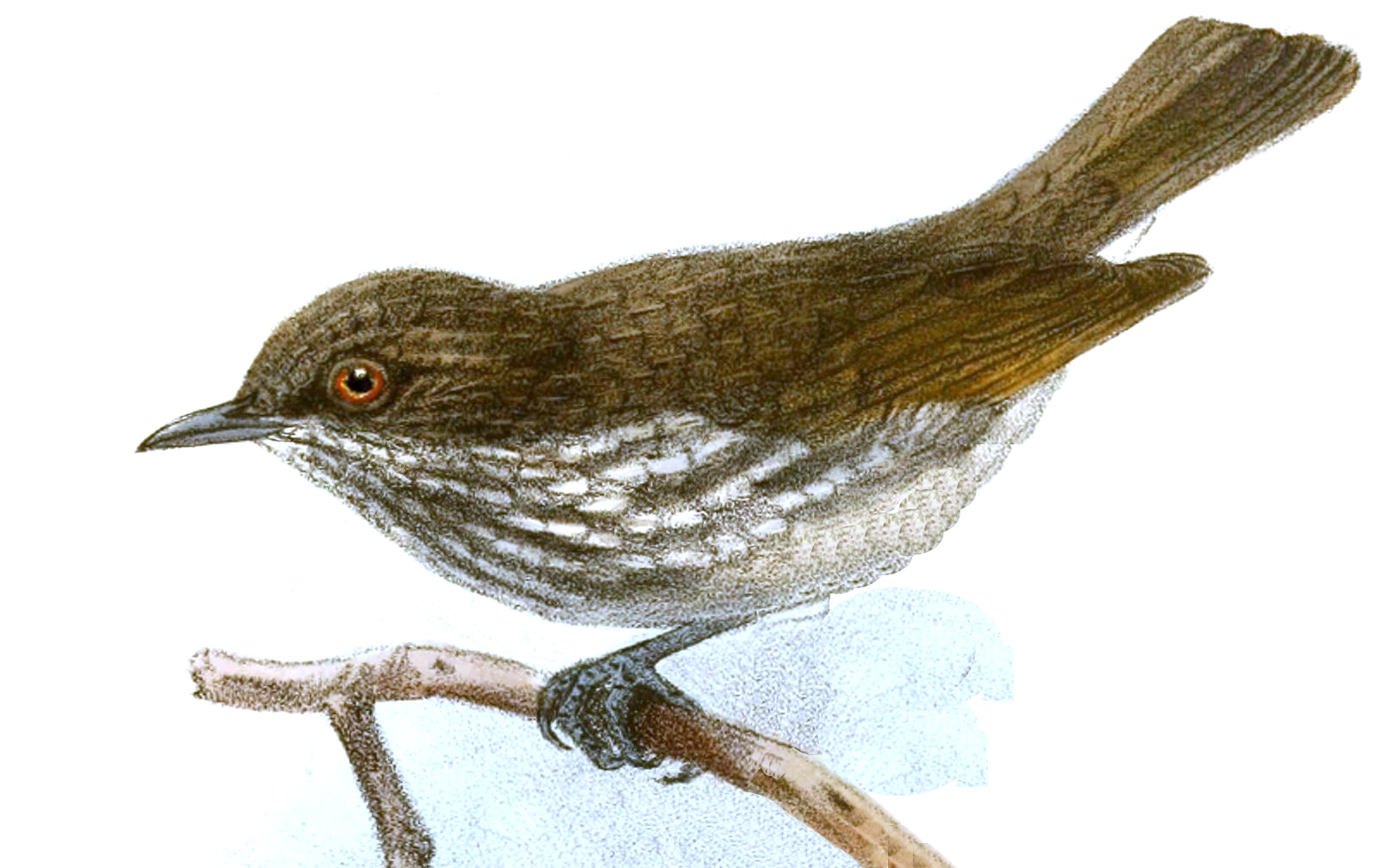

Conservation status
- Near Threatened (IUCN 3.1)

Scientific classification
- Kingdom: Animalia
- Phylum: Chordata
- Class: Aves
- Order: Passeriformes
- Family: Zosteropidae
- Genus: Dasycrotapha
- Species: D. pygmaea

Binomial name
- Dasycrotapha pygmaea (Ogilvie-Grant, 1896)

Synonyms
- Stachyris plateni pygmaea Stachyris pygmaea Sterrhoptilus pygmaeus

= Visayan pygmy babbler =

Species of bird

The Visayan pygmy babbler (Dasycrotapha pygmaea) is a bird species endemic to the Philippines on the islands of Leyte and Samar. It was conspecific with the Mindanao pygmy babbler under the common name of "pygmy babbler".Its natural habitats are tropical moist lowland forests and or tropical moist montane forests.

== Description and taxonomy ==
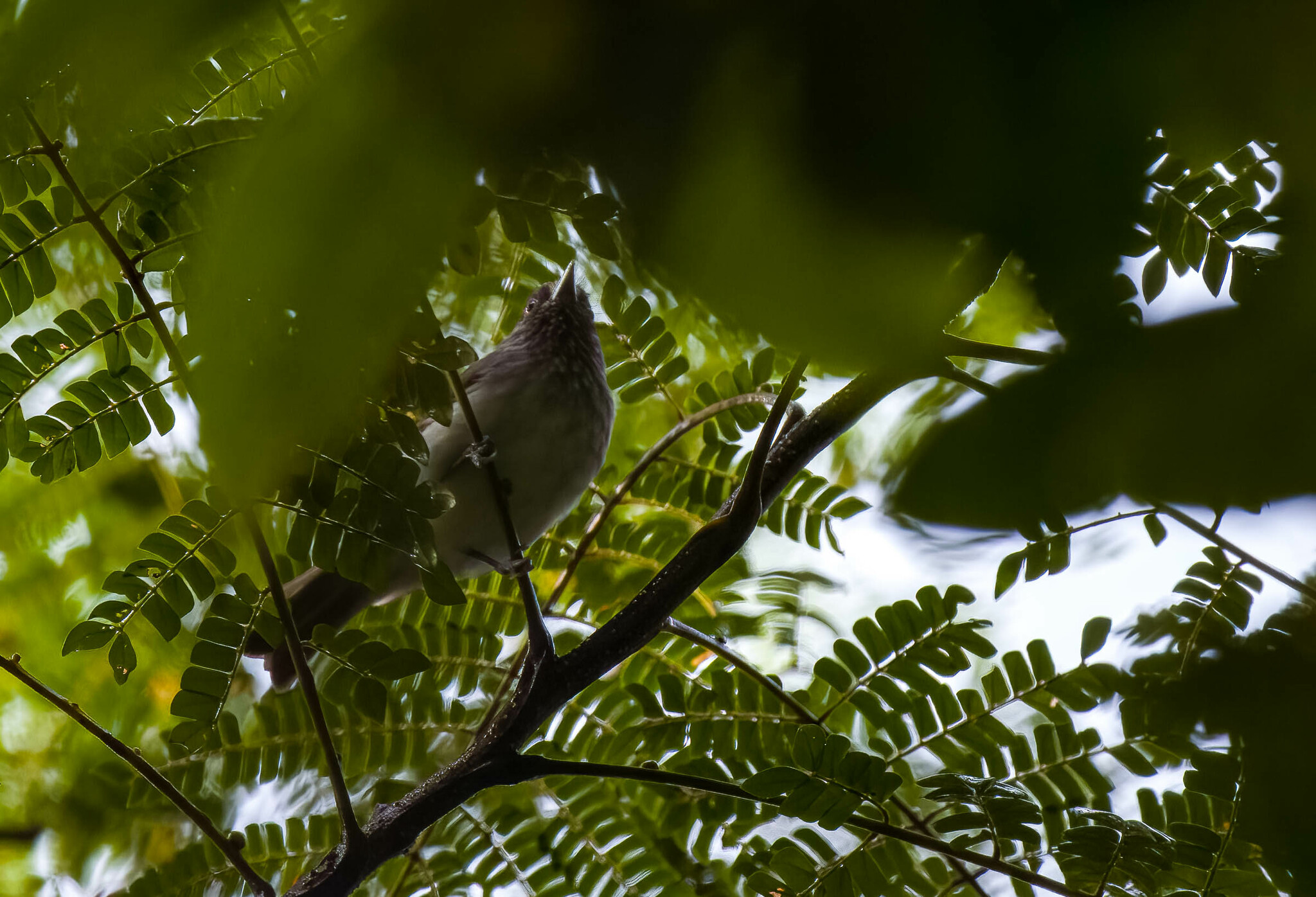
A Visayan pygmy babbler in Samar Island Natural Park

It is a small species of bird found in the lowland forest of Leyte and Samar. It has primarily dark reddish-brown plummage with a gray chest and blackish throat and face, all with fine white streaking. It has dull orange eyes with slaty gray bill and legs.

Its call is described as a series of jumbled twittering.

It belongs to the genus Dasycrotapha. It was placed in the family Timaliidae or true babblers, but recently found to be better placed in the family Zosteropidae or whiteeye . Apart from its range, It is differentiated by a darker smoky plumage compared to the reddish-brown Mindanao pygmy babbler.

== Behaviour and ecology ==
They have been observed to join mixed species flocks foraging through the middle-storey and lower cannopy. Its diet is presumed to be small insects and possibly small fruits.

Birds found in breeding condition with enlarged gonads in April and May which is in line with the general breeding season of Philippine forest birds. Otherwise, basically nothing is known about this bird.

== Habitat and conservation status ==
This bird is found in primary and secondary forest from 100 to 1,100 meters above sea level..

It has been assessed as Near-threatened by the International Union for Conservation of Nature with the population continuing to decline due to habitat loss from illegal logging, land-conversion and slash-and-burn. It is present in a protected area in the Samar Island Natural Park. While this area is listed as a national park, protection is lax and illegal logging and habitat encroachment are still rampant.

Conservation actions proposed include further surveys in suitable habitat especially in Leyte to better understand its range and enforcement of laws on illegal loggers in its habitat.
