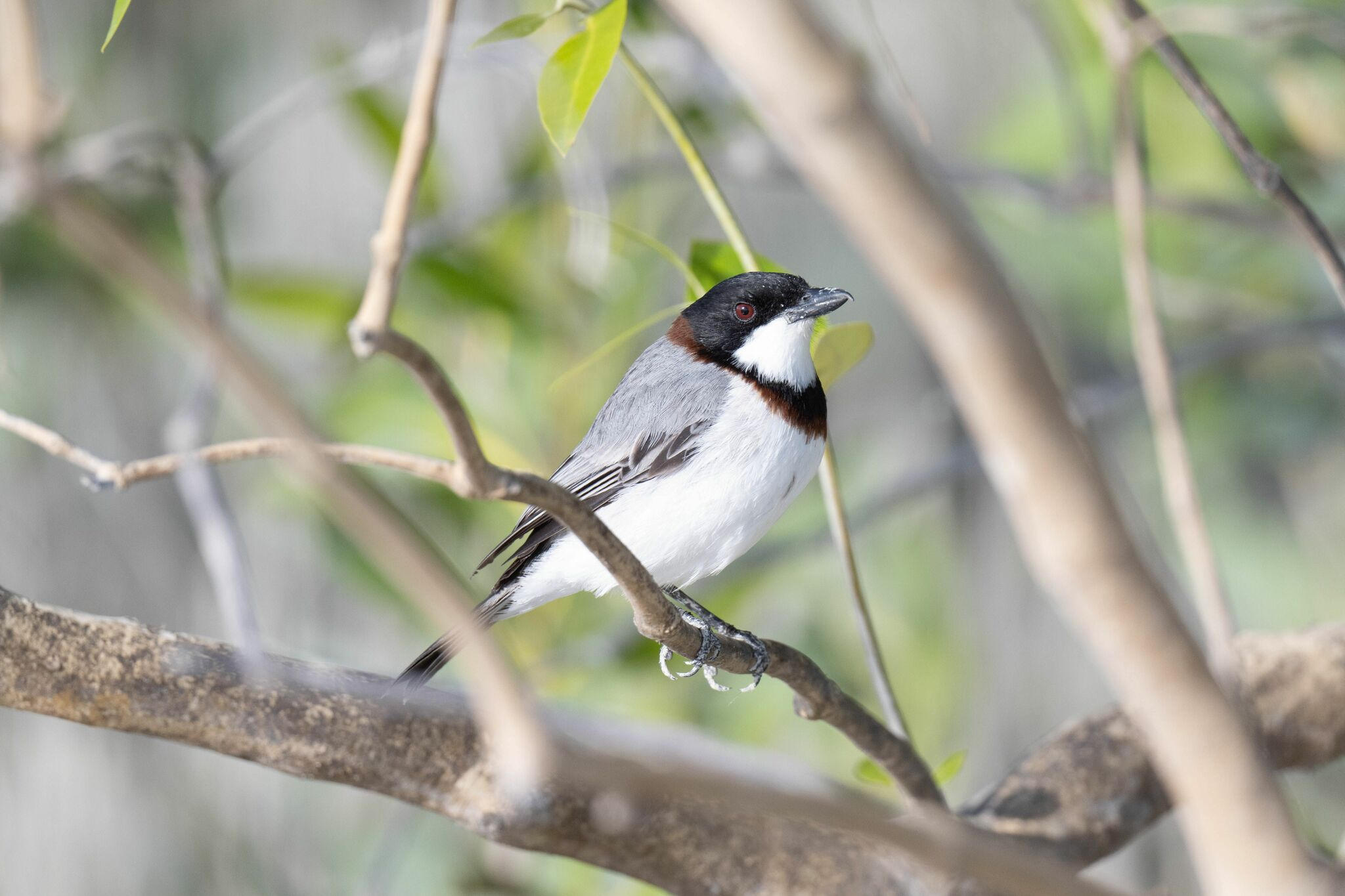
- Male
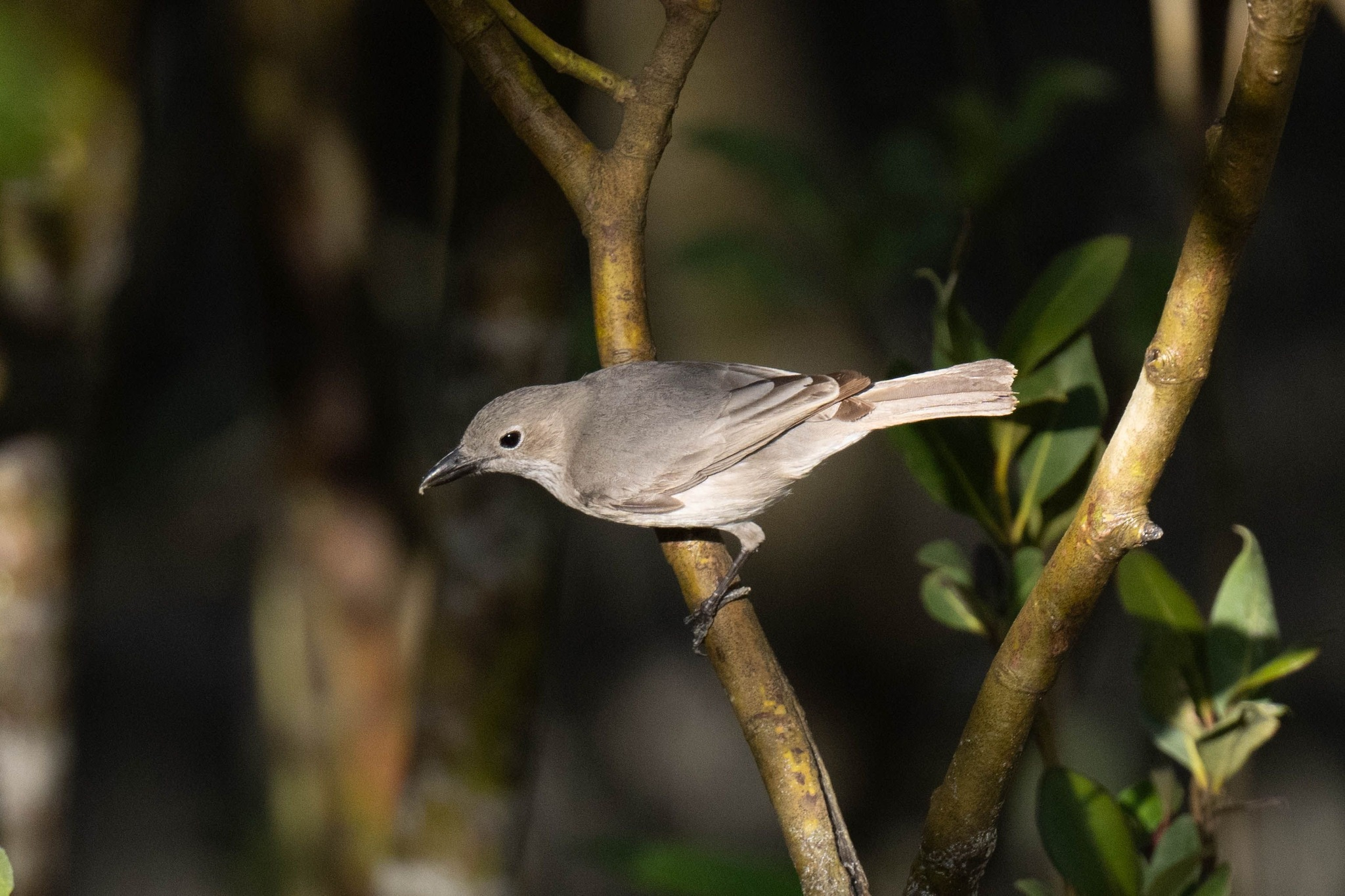
- Female

Conservation status
- Least Concern (IUCN 3.1)

Scientific classification
- Kingdom: Animalia
- Phylum: Chordata
- Class: Aves
- Order: Passeriformes
- Family: Pachycephalidae
- Genus: Pachycephala
- Species: P. lanioides

Binomial name
- Pachycephala lanioides Gould, 1840

Subspecies
- See text

Synonyms
- Alisterornis lanioides

= White-breasted whistler =

Species of bird

The white-breasted whistler (Pachycephala lanioides) is a species of bird in the family Pachycephalidae. It is endemic to Australia. Its natural habitat is subtropical or tropical mangrove forests.

== Taxonomy and systematics ==
Alternate names for the white-breasted whistler include white-bellied thickhead and white-bellied whistler. The latter name should not be confused with the species of the same name, Pachycephala leucogastra.

=== Subspecies ===
Three subspecies are recognized:

- P. l. carnarvoni - (Mathews, 1913): Found in coastal western Australia
- P. l. lanioides - Gould, 1840: Found in coastal northwestern Australia
- P. l. fretorum - De Vis, 1889: Originally described as a separate species. Found in coastal northern Australia
