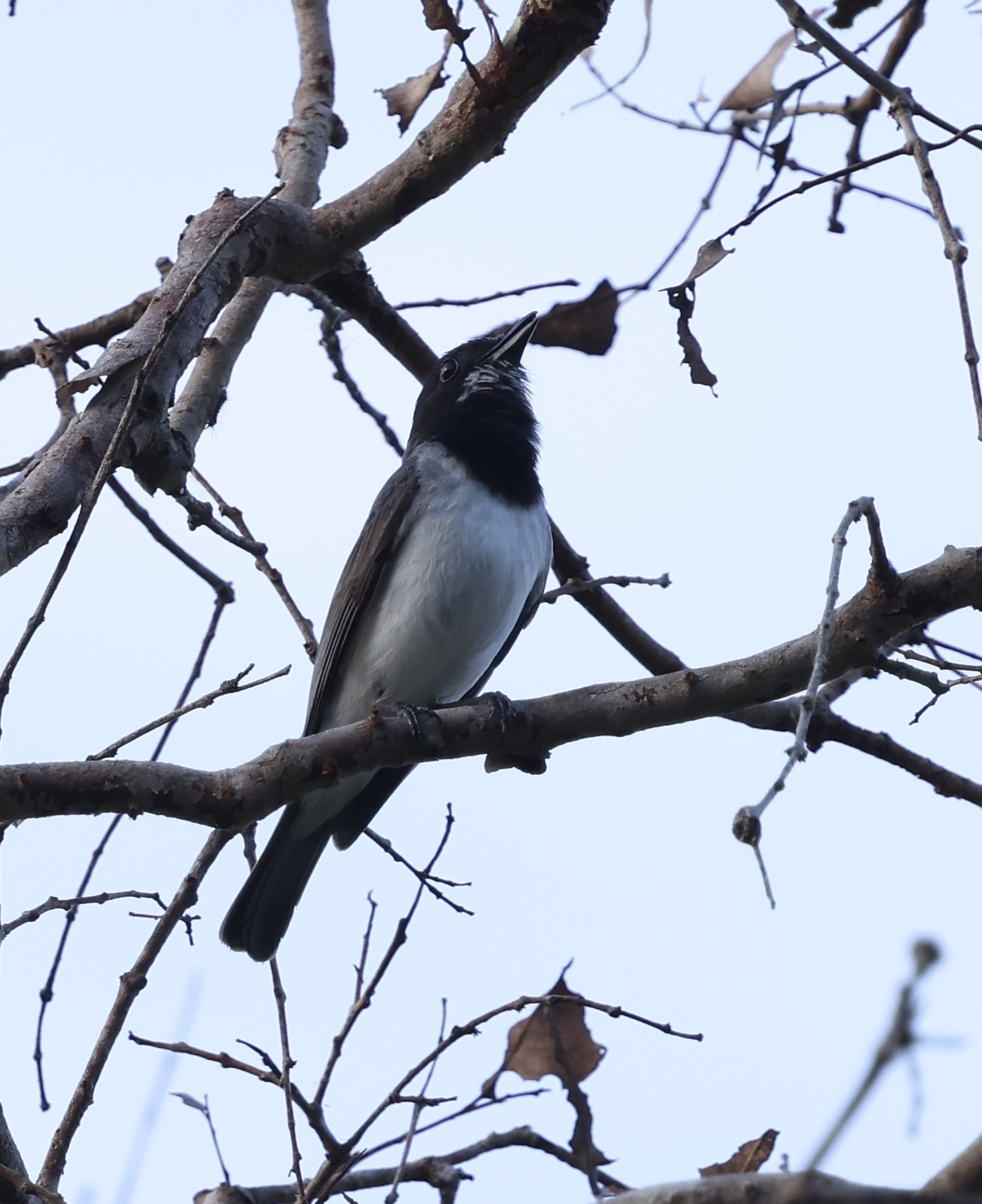

Conservation status
- Least Concern (IUCN 3.1)

Scientific classification
- Kingdom: Animalia
- Phylum: Chordata
- Class: Aves
- Order: Passeriformes
- Family: Pachycephalidae
- Genus: Pachycephala
- Species: P. leucogastra

Binomial name
- Pachycephala leucogastra Salvadori & D'Albertis, 1875

Subspecies
- See text

= White-bellied whistler =

Species of bird

The white-bellied whistler (Pachycephala leucogastra) is a species of bird in the family Pachycephalidae. The species has an oddly discontinuous distribution, occurring in two small patches of northern New Guinea, one small patch in south eastern New Guinea and on Rossel Island in the Louisiade Archipelago (off the tip of eastern New Guinea). The species uses a variety of habitats, including wet eucalyptus forests, mangrove forests, savanna, and modified habitats like rubber plantations.

== Taxonomy and systematics ==
The name 'white-bellied whistler' is also used as an alternate name for the mangrove whistler, white-vented whistler, rufous whistler and the white-breasted whistler.

=== Subspecies ===
Two subspecies are recognized:

- Pachycephala leucogastra leucogastra – Salvadori & D'Albertis, 1875: Found in southeastern New Guinea
- Pachycephala leucogastra meeki – Hartert, 1898: Originally described as a separate species. Found on Rossel Island (Louisiade Archipelago)
