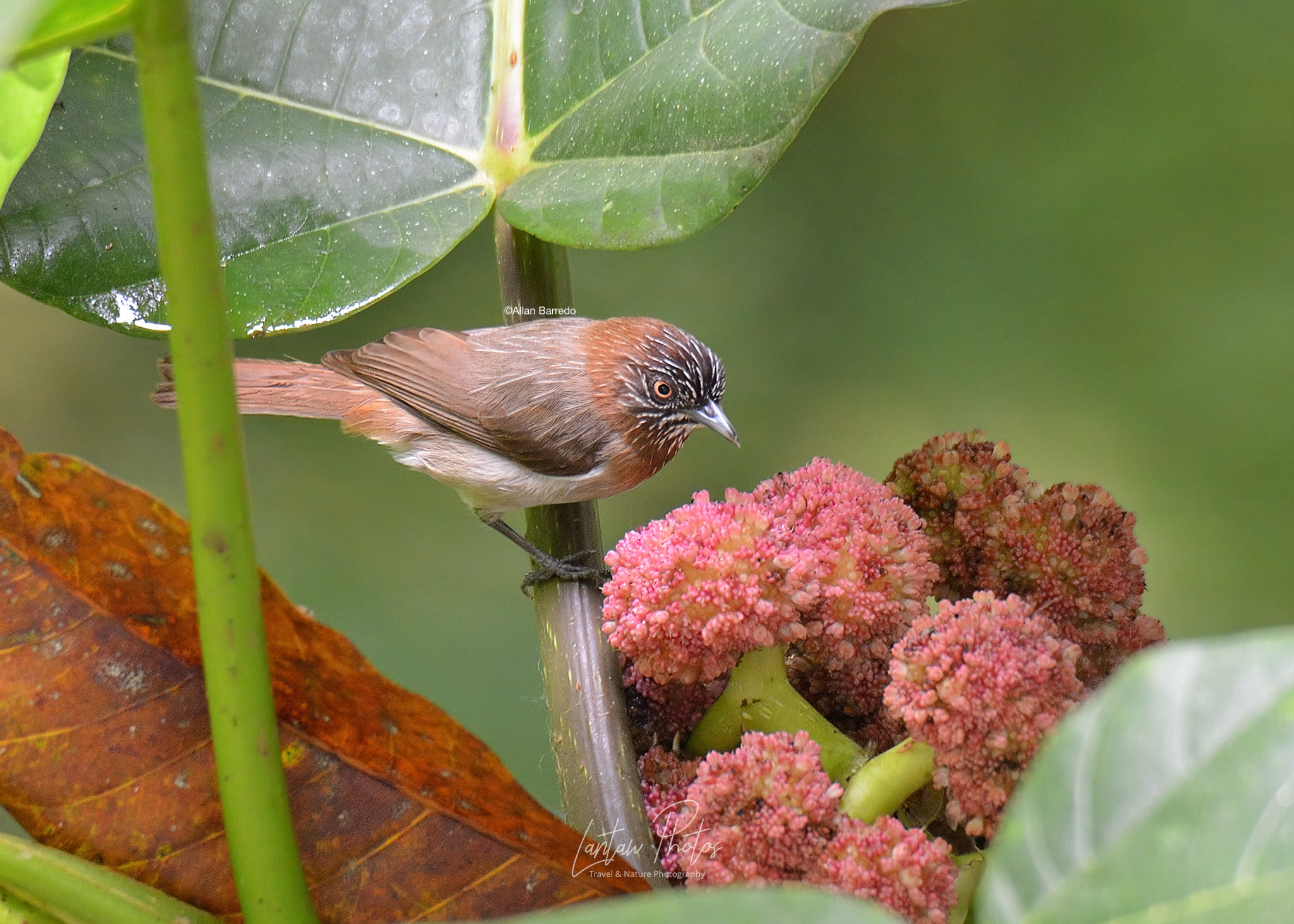

Conservation status
- Near Threatened (IUCN 3.1)

Scientific classification
- Kingdom: Animalia
- Phylum: Chordata
- Class: Aves
- Order: Passeriformes
- Family: Zosteropidae
- Genus: Dasycrotapha
- Species: D. plateni

Binomial name
- Dasycrotapha plateni (Blasius, 1890)

Synonyms
- Mixornis Plateni (protonym) Stachyris plateni Stachyris plateni plateni Sterrhoptilus plateni

= Mindanao pygmy babbler =

Mindanao Pygmy Babbler

Species of bird

The Mindanao pygmy babbler (Dasycrotapha plateni) is a bird species endemic to the Philippines found only on f Mindanao. Its natural habitats are tropical moist lowland forests and tropical moist montane forests up to 1,100 meters above sea level. It is often seen in mixed flocks with other forest birds.It was formerly conspecific with the Visayan pygmy babbler. It has been classified by the IUCN as Near-threatened due to habitat loss.

== Description and taxonomy ==
This species is a small bird found in the lowland and foothill forests of Midnanao. It has a blackish face, a reddish brown upperparts and chest and a brown back. It has striations on the top half of its body, a pale yellow eye and a thin black bill.

Its call is decribed as jumpled twittering.

The scientific name commemorates the German zoologist Carl Constantin Platen.

It had been placed in the family Timaliidae or true babblers, but it is a close relative of the white-eyes and is now placed in the family Zosteropidae.

The Visayan pygmy babbler was formerly included here as a subspecies, but is usually recognized as a distinct species S. pygmaea today. Together, they were simply called "pygmy babbler". The Mindanao species is differentiated by having a strong reddish brown versus the Visayan's smoky brown plummage.

== Behaviour and ecology ==
It feeds on small insects and small fruits. Often found in pairs or mixed species flocks that include other birds such as Mindanao blue fantail, Yellow-bellied whistler, Brown tit-babbler, Celestial monarch, Short-crested monarch, Rusty-crowned babbler. Forages fairly 3-6 meters from the forest floor, occasionally seen in the lower canopy.

Birds found in breeding condition with enlarged gonads in March and May which is in line with the general breeding season of Philippine forest birds. Their nests is reported to include fluffy seed matter. Otherwise, basically nothing is known about this bird.

== Habitat and conservation status ==
Its natural habitat is tropical moist lowland forest up to 1,100 meters above sea level. It is seen on the undergrowth of primary forests or along forest edge where it is uncommon across its range.

The International Union for Conservation of Nature has assessed this species as near-threatened with the population decreasing due to the deforestation of its preferred lowland forest.

It occurs in some protected areas like Pasonanca Natural Park, Mount Matutum, Mount Apo and Mount Kitanglad but despite this actual protection and enforcement against illegal logging are lax.

== Gallery ==
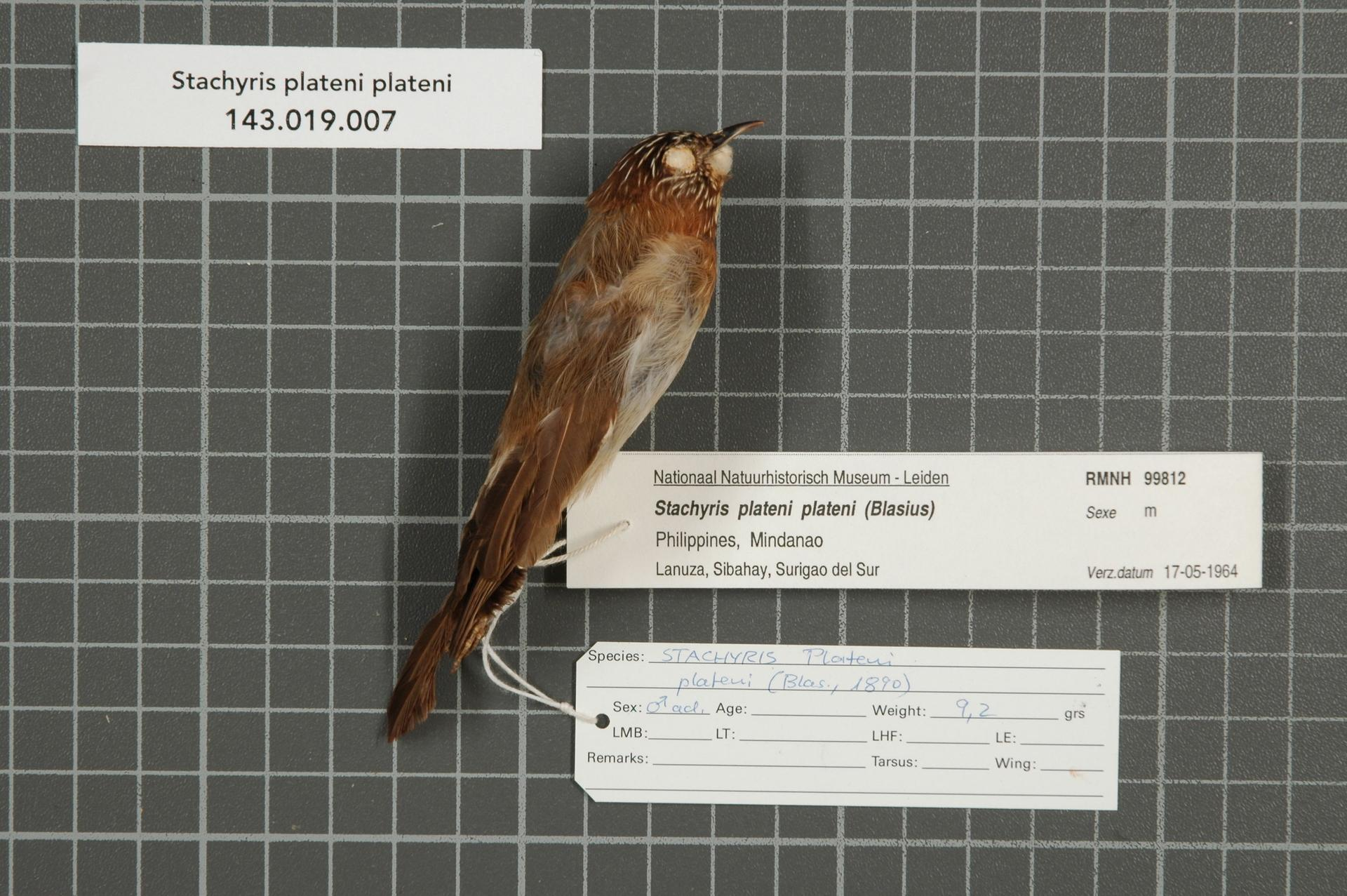
A specimen from the Naturalis Biodiversity Center
