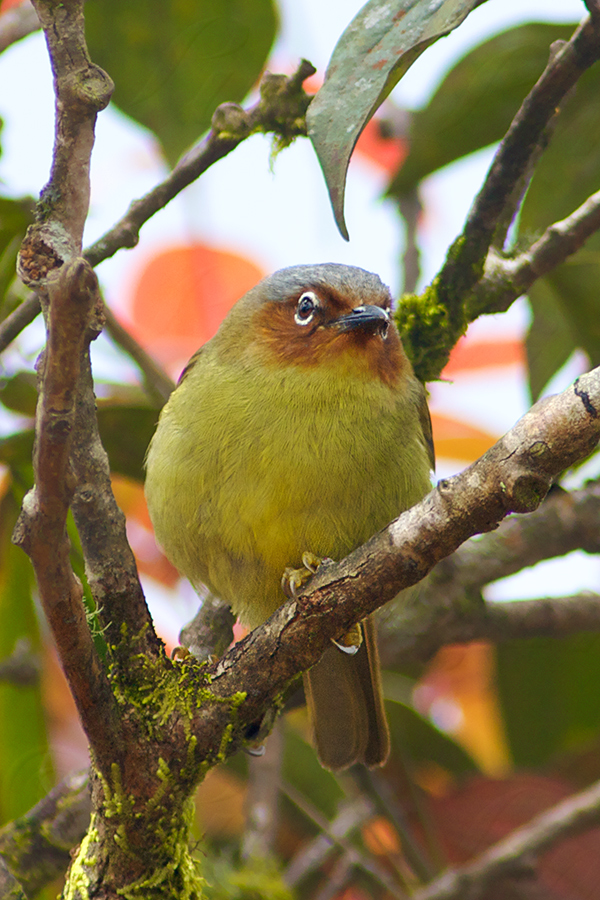
- Chestnut-faced babbler (Zosterornis whiteheadi)

Scientific classification
- Kingdom: Animalia
- Phylum: Chordata
- Class: Aves
- Order: Passeriformes
- Family: Zosteropidae
- Genus: Zosterornis; Ogilvie-Grant, 1894

Type species
- Zosterornis whiteheadi (chestnut-faced babbler) Ogilvie-Grant, 1894

Species
- see text

= Zosterornis =

Genus of birds

Zosterornis is a genus of passerine birds in the white-eye family Zosteropidae. The five species in the genus are endemic to the Philippines.

== Taxonomy ==
The genus Zosterornis was introduced in 1894 by the Scottish ornithologist William Robert Ogilvie-Grant to accommodate his newly described species, the chestnut-faced babbler, which thus becomes the type species. The name combines the Ancient Greek zōstēr meaning "belt" with ornis meaning "bird".

These species were formerly included in the genus Stachyris in the Old World babblers family Timaliidae. They were moved to their own genus Zosterornis in the white-eye family Zosteropidae based on molecular phylogenetic studies published in the first decade of the 21st century.

The genus contains the following five species:

Image	Common name	Scientific name
	Chestnut-faced babbler	Zosterornis whiteheadi
	Luzon striped babbler	Zosterornis striatus
	Panay striped babbler	Zosterornis latistriatus
	Negros striped babbler	Zosterornis nigrorum
	Palawan striped babbler	Zosterornis hypogrammicus
