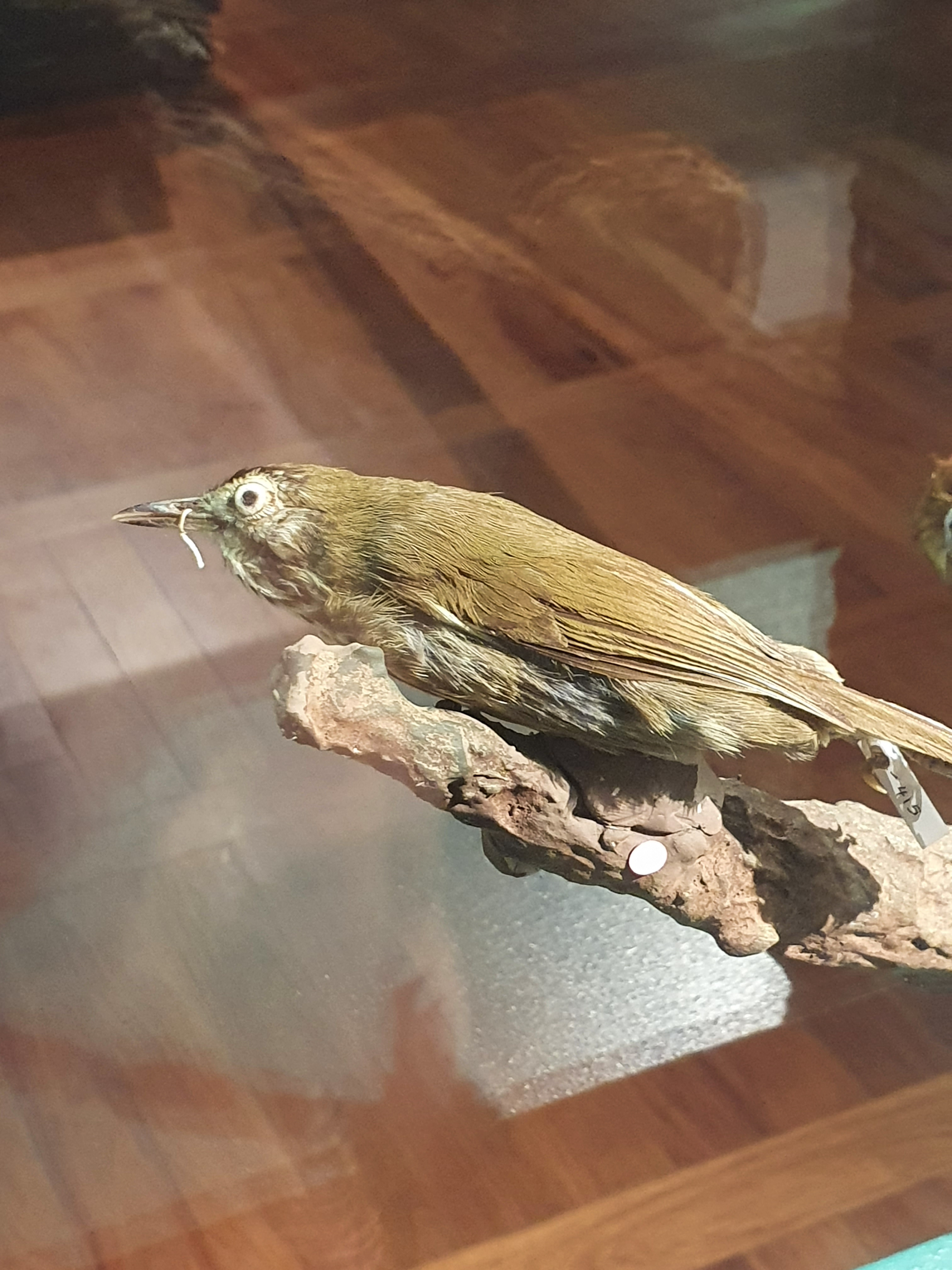
- A stuffed specimen from National Museum of Natural History (Manila)

Conservation status
- Least Concern (IUCN 3.1)

Scientific classification
- Kingdom: Animalia
- Phylum: Chordata
- Class: Aves
- Order: Passeriformes
- Family: Zosteropidae
- Genus: Zosterornis
- Species: Z. latistriatus

Binomial name
- Zosterornis latistriatus (Gonzales & Kennedy, RS, 1990)

Synonyms
- Stachyris latistriatus

= Panay striped babbler =

Species of bird

The Panay striped babbler (Zosterornis latistriatus) is a species of bird in the family Zosteropidae and was completely unknown to science until its discovery in 1987 and designation as its own species in 1990. It is endemic to the Philippines only being found on the island of Panay. Its natural habitat is tropical moist montane forest. It is threatened by habitat loss.

== Description and taxonomy ==
A fairly small bird of mid-elevation montane forest on Panay. Dark brown above and heavily streaked with black below, with base color blending from white on the throat to buffy on the lower belly. Note the white face edged with black and the thin black stripe behind the eye. Voice is described as a loud staccato trill.

Contrary to its name, this species is closer related to White-eyes and are in the same family as them

This species was only discovered in 1987, it was initially placed as conspecific with the Negros striped babbler, having only been separated as species in 1990. It is differentiated from it with its darker streaking on its belly and more defined mask, it is also slightly more creamy white rather than yellow. It also differs vocally.

== Ecology and behavior ==
Feeds on insects and small fruits. Found singly, in pairs and small groups. Joins mixed-species feeding flocks that include Visayan bulbul, Visayan fantail, Warbling white-eye, Mountain leaf warbler and Elegant tit. Gleans dead leaves searching for food and forages in the understorey and bushes.

A nest was found in October and birds with enlarged gonads seen in April. Nest was made of live and dead mosses, lined with roots and stems from orchids placed 5 meters above the ground. This nest had 2 eggs but there is not enough samples to determine average clutch size, Otherwise, there is no other information about its breeding habits and nesting.

== Habitat and conservation status ==
This species is known from montane mossy forest from 1,100 m to 1,900 m with most records being above 1,400 m. It prefers the middle and upper strata of the forest.

IUCN has assessed this bird as least concern but was formerly listed as near-threatened species. This species' main threat is habitat loss with wholesale clearance of forest habitats as a result of logging, agricultural conversion and mining activities occurring within the range. Forest cover on Panay is just 6% but relative to other lowland species, the upland montane forest has remained better preserved due to the rugged landscape.
