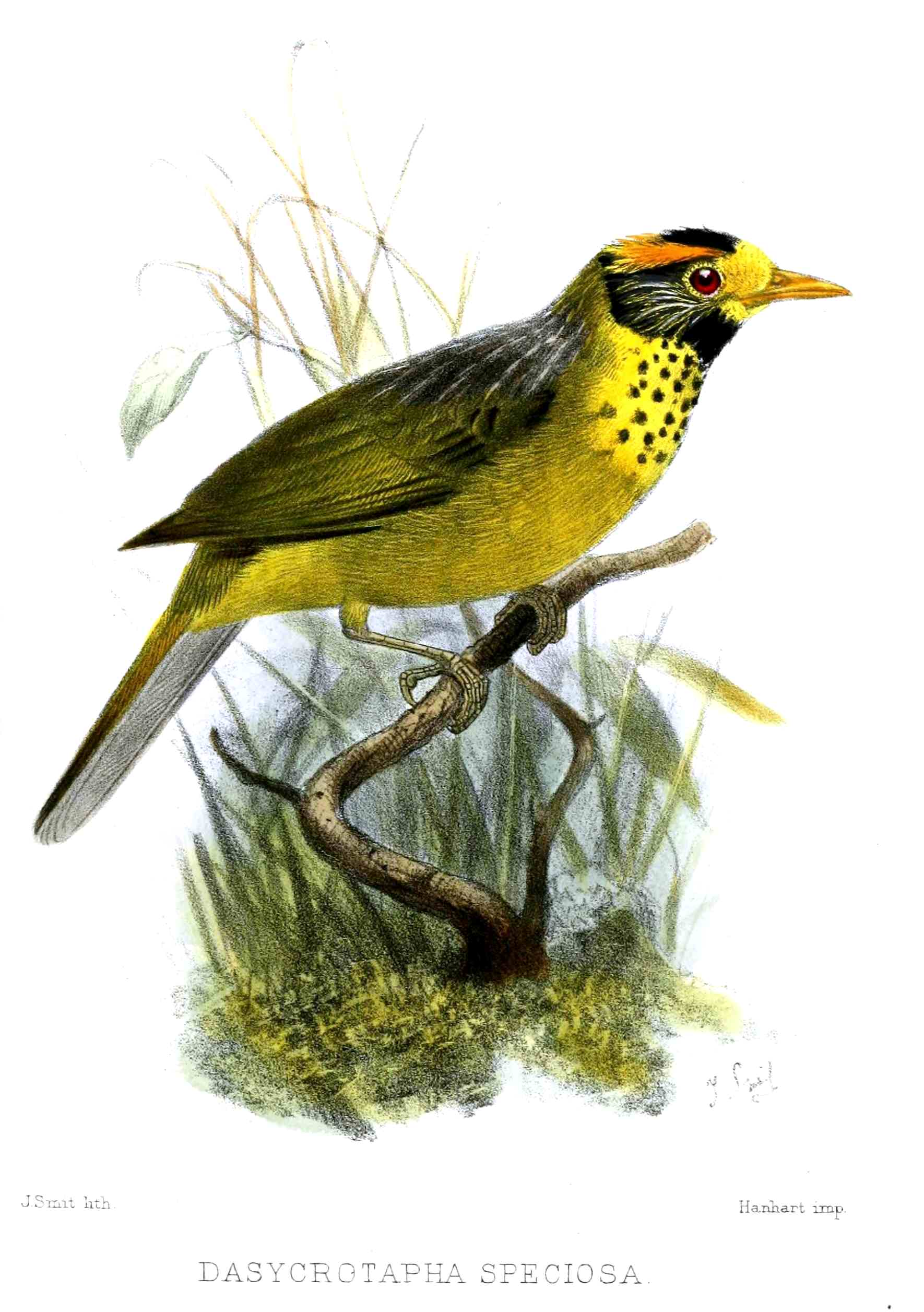
- Flame-templed babbler (Dasycrotapha speciosa)

Scientific classification
- Kingdom: Animalia
- Phylum: Chordata
- Class: Aves
- Order: Passeriformes
- Family: Zosteropidae
- Genus: Dasycrotapha; Tweeddale, 1878

Type species
- Dasycrotapha speciosa Tweeddale, 1878

= Dasycrotapha =

Genus of birds

Dasycrotapha is a genus of bird in the family Zosteropidae.

It contains the following three species:

Image	Common name	Scientific name
	Flame-templed babbler	Dasycrotapha speciosa
	Mindanao pygmy babbler	Dasycrotapha plateni
	Visayan pygmy babbler	Dasycrotapha pygmaea
