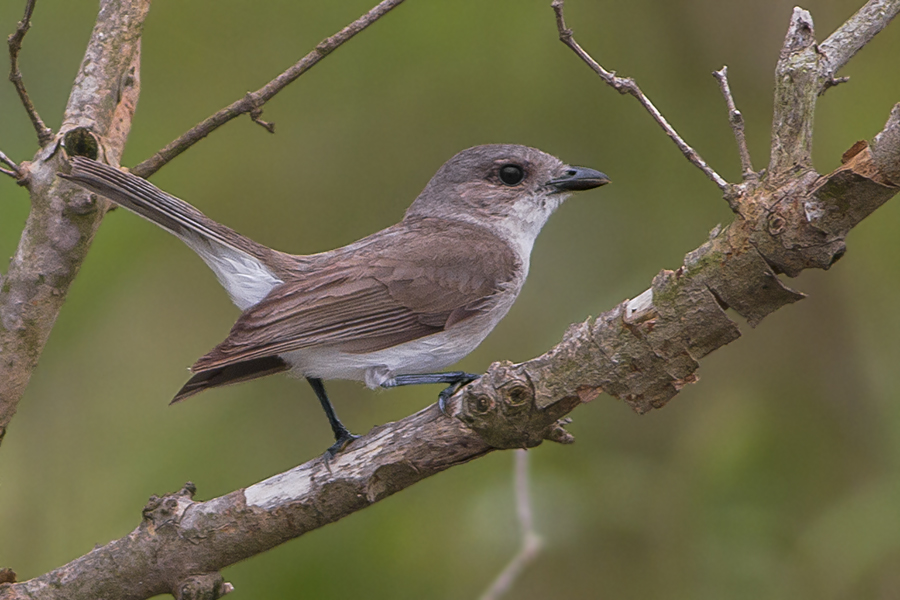
- From Sundarbans, West Bengal, India

Conservation status
- Least Concern (IUCN 3.1)

Scientific classification
- Kingdom: Animalia
- Phylum: Chordata
- Class: Aves
- Order: Passeriformes
- Family: Pachycephalidae
- Genus: Pachycephala
- Species: P. cinerea

Binomial name
- Pachycephala cinerea (Blyth, 1847)

Subspecies
- See text

Synonyms
- Muscitrea cinerea; Pachycephala grisola

= Mangrove whistler =

Species of bird

The mangrove whistler (Pachycephala cinerea) is a species of bird in the family Pachycephalidae found in South-east Asia.

== Taxonomy and systematics ==
Alternate names for the mangrove whistler include the grey thickhead and white-bellied whistler. The latter name should not be confused with the species of the same name, Pachycephala leucogastra. Formerly, both the green-backed and white-vented whistlers were considered to be subspecies of the mangrove whistler.

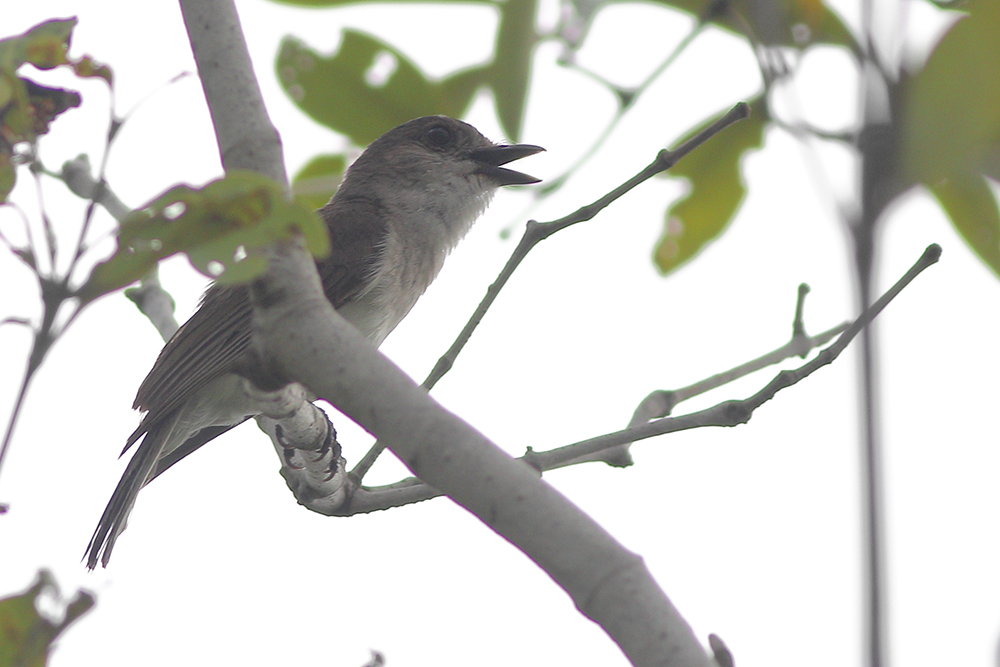
P. c. cinerea from Sundarban, India.

=== Subspecies ===
Two subspecies are recognized:

- P. c. cinerea – (Blyth, 1847): Found from northeastern India to Indochina and the Greater Sundas
- Palawan thickhead (P. c. plateni), or Palawan whistler – (Blasius, W, 1888): Originally described as a separate species. Found in Palawan (Philippines)
