= Mandalagan =

Volcano on the island of Negros, Philippines

Mount Mandalagan
- Location within Philippines

Highest point
- Elevation: 1,885 m (6,184 ft)
- Prominence: 1,340 m (4,400 ft)
- Listing: Ribu
- Coordinates: 10°39′N 123°15′E

Geography
- Location: Philippines

Geology
- Rock age: unknown
- Mountain type: Stratovolcano
- Last eruption: Unknown

Mount Mandalagan is a complex volcano located at latitude 10.65° North (10°39'0"N), longitude 123.25° East (123°15'0"E), in the province of Negros Occidental, on the north of the island of Negros of the Philippines. It is located inside the Northern Negros Natural Park.

Mandalagan is a solfataric, fumarolic, potentially active stratovolcano. Mandalagan is also known as Nahigda nga Babayi or Lying Women for the Bacolodnons and Negrenses.

== Physical Features ==
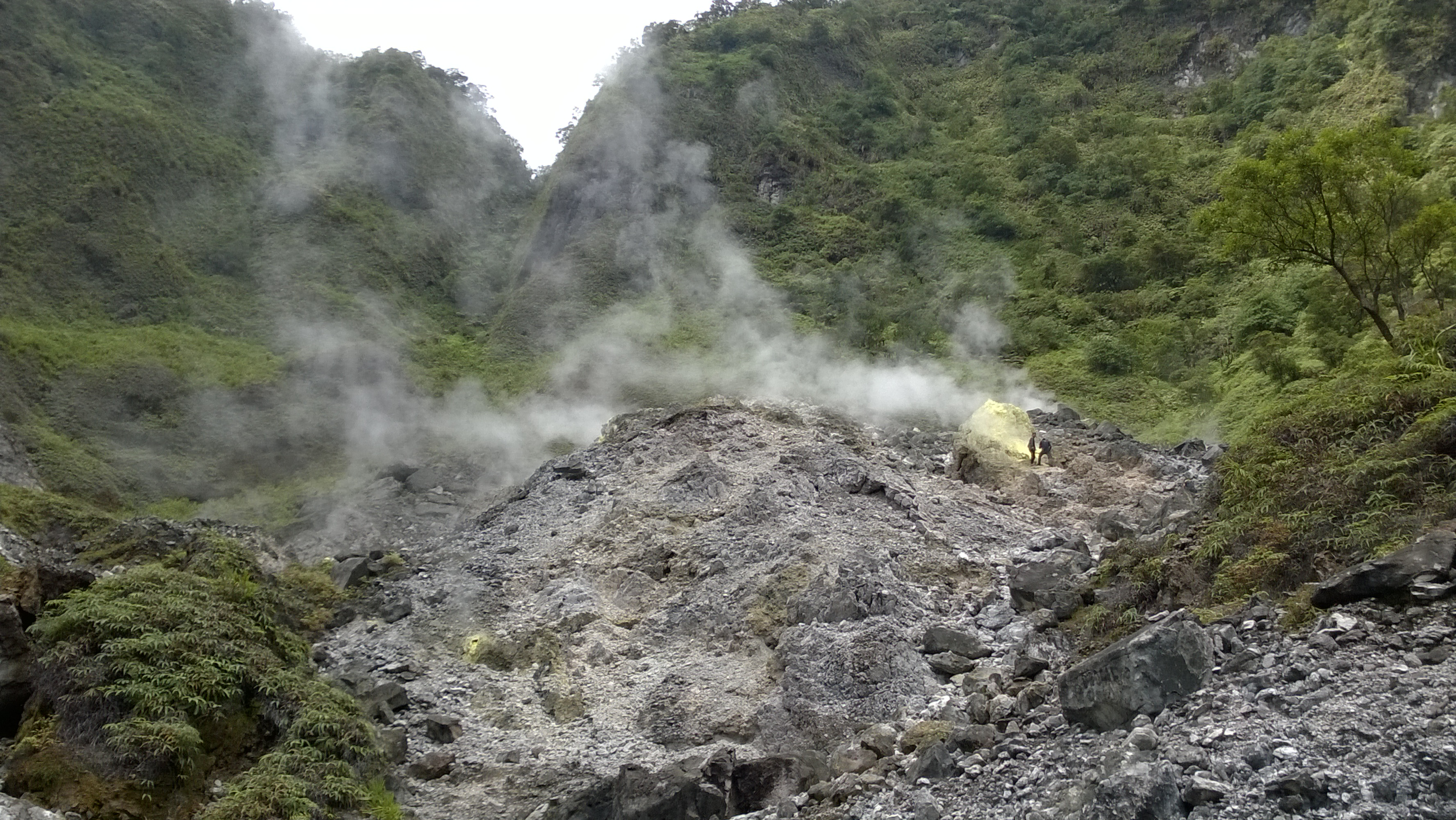
A solfatara area in Mt. Mandalagan.

Elevation is 1885 metres (6,184 feet), with a base diameter of 26 kilometres.

Mandalagan is a deeply dissected complex volcano, with a highly altered volcanic dome.

Volcanic activity is reported to include seven volcanic centres, at least five craters and/or calderas up to 2 km in diameter, and a vigorous solfataric area at the highly altered volcanic dome structure.

One solfataric area emits a high-temperature (106 degrees C) plume to 30 m height with a roaring noise like a high-pressure geothermal borehole.

== Images ==
The Smithsonian listing has a satellite photograph of the general area.

== Geological Features ==
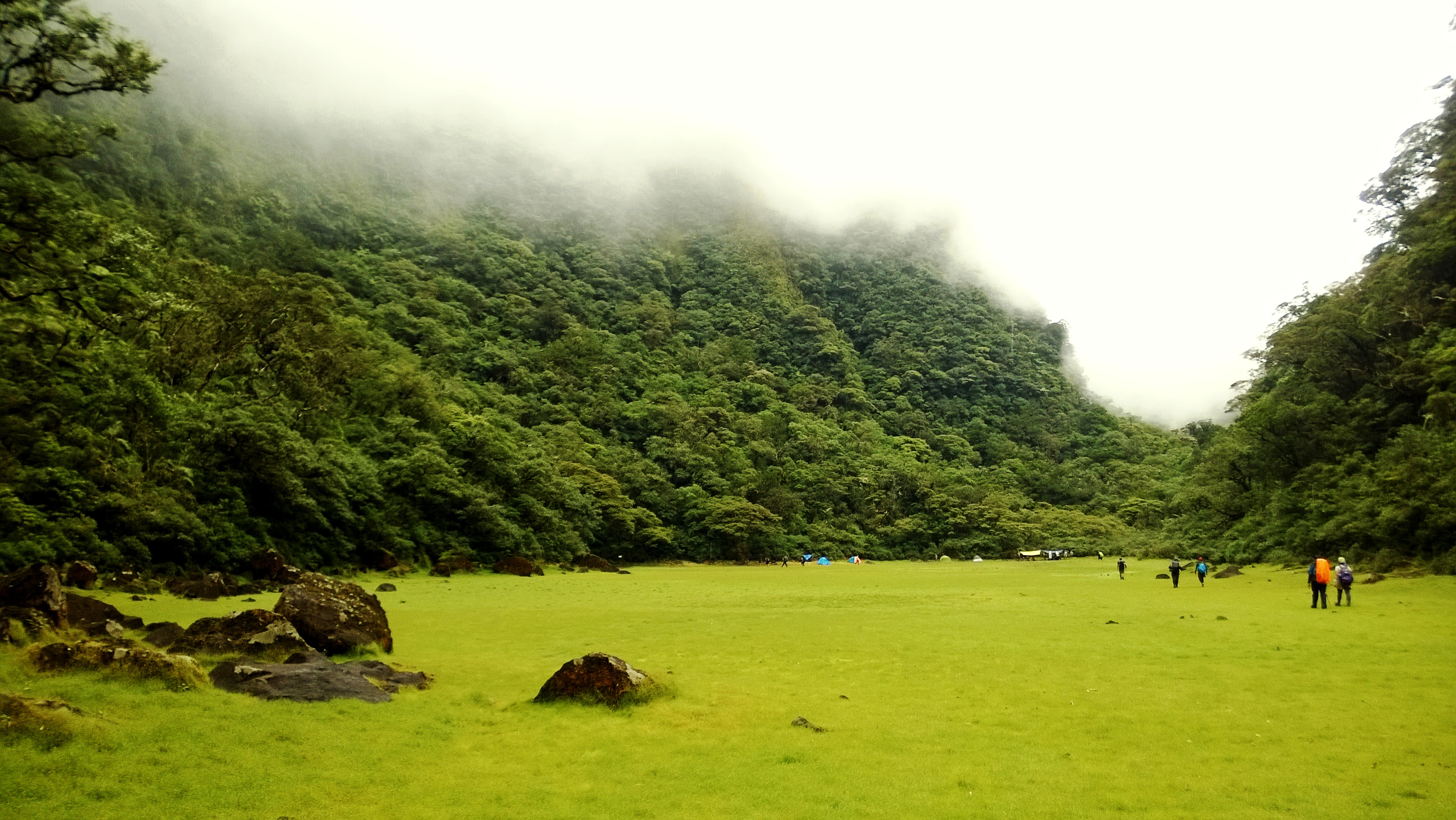
The Tinagong Dagat caldera is a popular hiking destination which floods during the wet season.

Mandalagan is part of the Negros Volcanic Belt.

Rock type is principally andesitic with some dacitic

A crater located near the center called "Tinagong Dagat", where hikers camp.

== Eruption ==
The most recent eruption produced a thin basaltic lava flow, but it is not known when this is likely to have occurred.

== Listings ==
Philippine Institute of Volcanology and Seismology (PHIVOLCS) lists Mandalagan as potentially active.

The Smithsonian Global Volcanism Program lists Mandalagan as fumarolic.

== See also ==
- List of active volcanoes in the Philippines
- List of potentially active volcanoes in the Philippines
- List of inactive volcanoes in the Philippines
- Philippine Institute of Volcanology and Seismology
- Volcano
