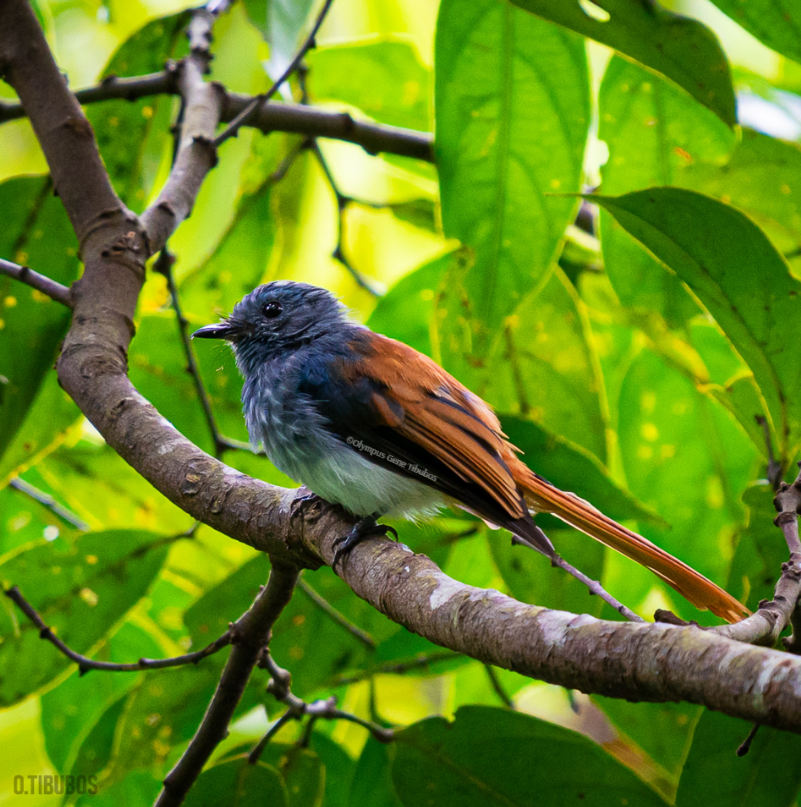

Conservation status
- Least Concern (IUCN 3.1)

Scientific classification
- Kingdom: Animalia
- Phylum: Chordata
- Class: Aves
- Order: Passeriformes
- Family: Rhipiduridae
- Genus: Rhipidura
- Species: R. albiventris

Binomial name
- Rhipidura albiventris (Sharpe, 1877)

= Visayan fantail =

Species of bird

The Visayan fantail (Rhipidura albiventris) is a fantail endemic to the Philippines on the islands of Negros, Panay, Guimaras, Masbate and Ticao. Until recently, it was considered conspecific with the blue-headed fantail and the Tablas fantail.

== Description and taxonomy ==
It is differentiated from the blue-headed fantail and Tablas fantail with its white belly and generally lighter coloration.

== Ecology and behavior ==
The diet of the Mindanao blue fantail consists of insects. It is often observed in mixed flocks with other birds such as Black-naped monarch, Flame-templed babbler, White-vented whistler, Lemon-throated leaf warbler, sunbirds and flowerpeckers.

Breeding has been recorded from February to May. Nest is cup shaped and is relatively open.Lays 2 eggs.

== Habitat and conservation status ==
Its habitat is in tropical moist primary and secondary forest and forest edge both in the lowlands to montane areas up to 1,800 meters above sea level.

IUCN has assessed this bird as a least-concern species. However, it is said to be already extinct on Guimaras and possibly extinct on Masbate and Ticao Island owing to massive deforestation on those islands.
