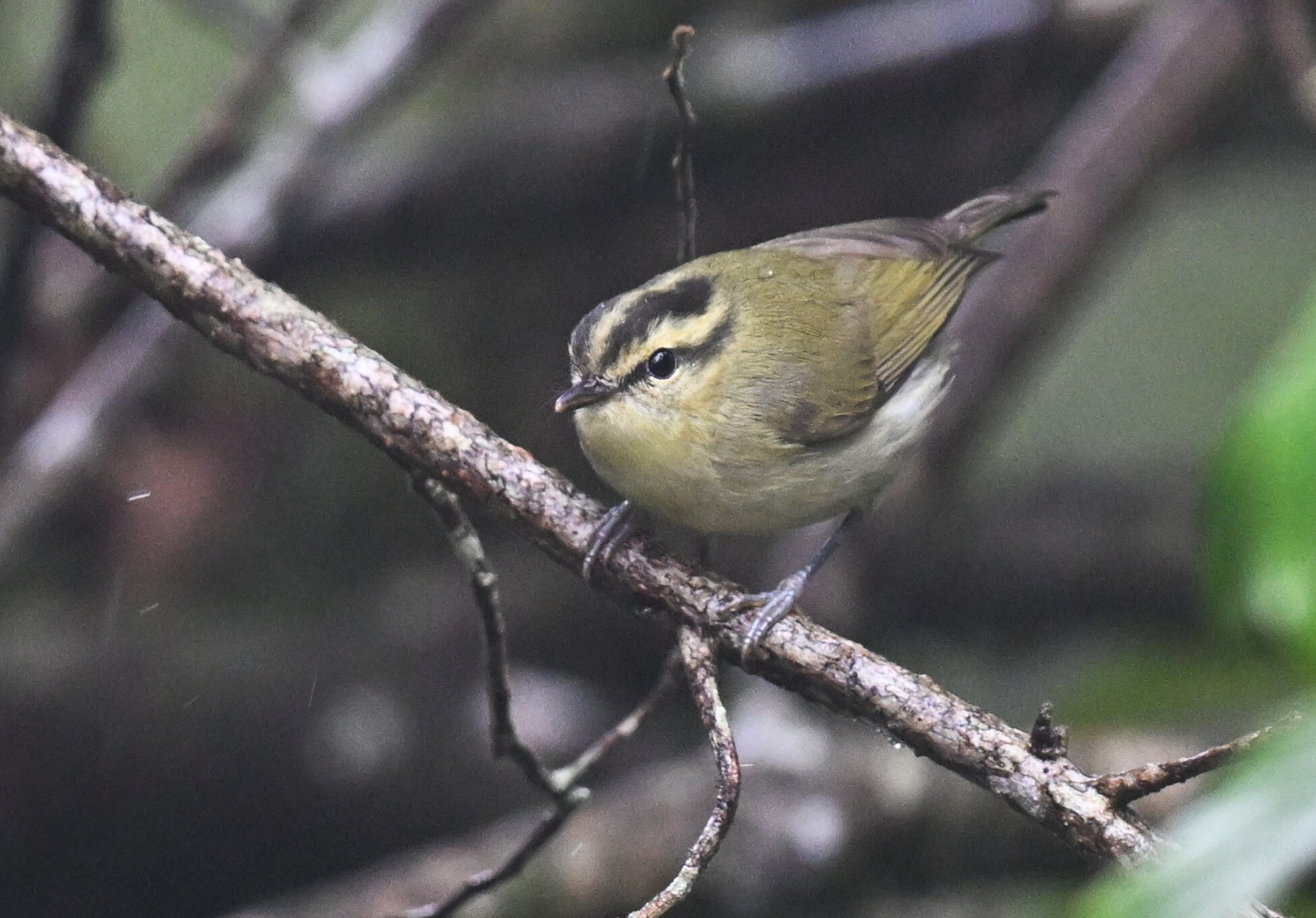

Conservation status
- Least Concern (IUCN 3.1)

Scientific classification
- Kingdom: Animalia
- Phylum: Chordata
- Class: Aves
- Order: Passeriformes
- Family: Phylloscopidae
- Genus: Phylloscopus
- Species: P. trivirgatus

Binomial name
- Phylloscopus trivirgatus Strickland, 1849

= Mountain leaf warbler =

Species of bird

The mountain leaf warbler (Phylloscopus trivirgatus) is a songbird species from the leaf warbler family (Phylloscopidae). It was formerly included in the "Old World warbler" assemblage.

It is found in Indonesia and Malaysia. Its natural habitats are subtropical or tropical moist lowland forest and subtropical or tropical moist montane forest.
