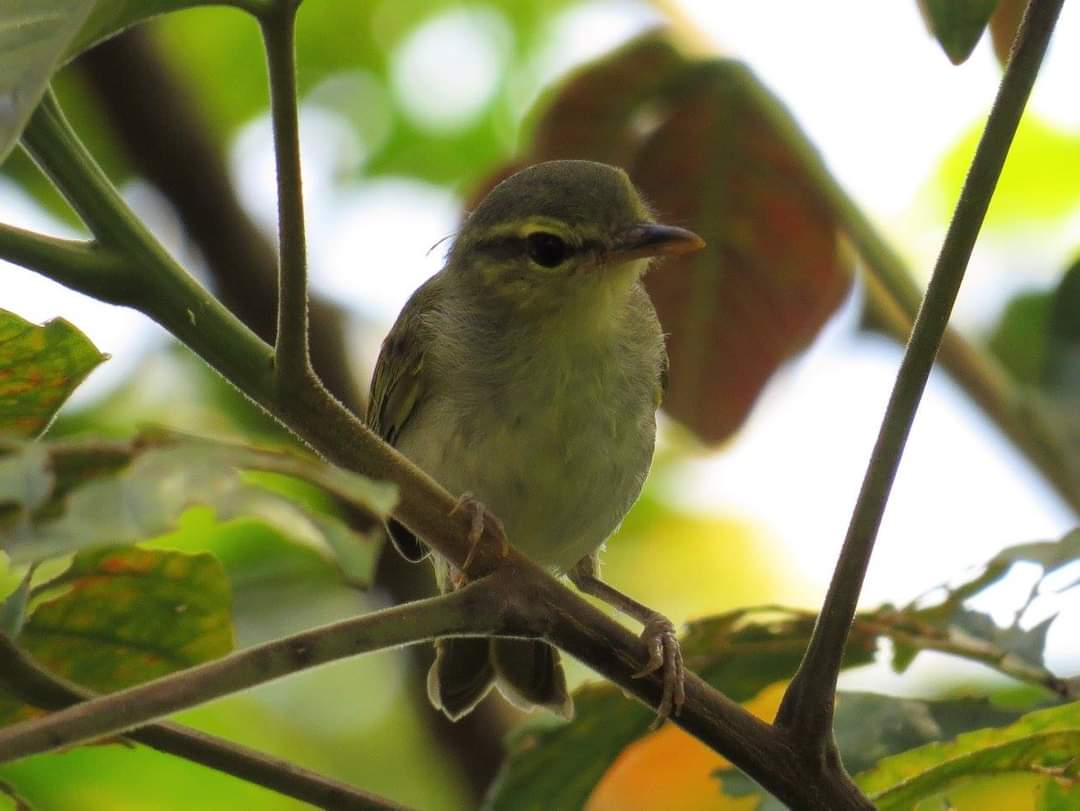

Conservation status
- Least Concern (IUCN 3.1)

Scientific classification
- Kingdom: Animalia
- Phylum: Chordata
- Class: Aves
- Order: Passeriformes
- Family: Phylloscopidae
- Genus: Phylloscopus
- Species: P. cebuensis

Binomial name
- Phylloscopus cebuensis (Dubois, 1900)

= Lemon-throated leaf warbler =

Species of bird

The lemon-throated leaf warbler (Phylloscopus cebuensis) is a species of Old World warbler in the family Phylloscopidae. It is endemic to the Philippines found on the islands of Luzon, Negros and Cebu.

== Description and taxonomy ==
=== Subspecies ===
Three subspecies are recognized:

- P. c. cebuensis — Found on Negros and Cebu
- P. c. sorsogonensis — Found on Bicol Peninsula
- P. c. luzonensis — Found on Luzon except the Bicol Peninsula

== Ecology and behavior ==
Feeds on small insects. Forages alone or joins mixed-species foraging flocks finding insects from the foliage.

Breeds from March to June but otherwise no information is known about its breeding habits and nest.

== Habitat and conservation status ==
Its natural habitats at tropical moist lowland primary forest and secondary forest up to 1,800 meters above sea level.

The IUCN Red List has assessed this bird as least-concern species although it is poorly known. More studies are recommended to better understand this species, population and conservation status.
