= List of birds of the Philippines =

This is a list of the bird species recorded in the Philippines. The avifauna of the Philippines include a total of 743 species, of which 229 are endemic, five have been introduced by humans.

This list's taxonomic treatment (designation and sequence of orders, families and species) and nomenclature (common and scientific names) follow the conventions of The Clements Checklist of Birds of the World, 2022 edition. The family accounts at the beginning of each heading reflect this taxonomy, as do the species counts found in each family account. Introduced and accidental species are included in the total counts for the Philippines.

The following tags have been used to highlight several categories. The commonly occurring native species do not fall into any of these categories:

- (A) Accidental: a species that rarely or accidentally occurs in the Philippines
- (E) Endemic: a species endemic to the Philippines
- (I) Introduced: a species introduced to the Philippines as a consequence, direct or indirect, of human actions

== Ducks, geese, and waterfowl ==
Order: Anseriformes Family: Anatidae

Anatidae includes the ducks and most duck-like waterfowl, such as geese and swans. These birds are adapted to an aquatic existence with webbed feet, flattened bills, and feathers that are excellent at shedding water due to an oily coating.

Common name	Scientific name	Presence	IUCN	Image
Spotted whistling-duck	Dendrocygna guttata			
Wandering whistling-duck	Dendrocygna arcuata			
Bar-headed goose	Anser indicus	(A)		
Graylag goose	Anser anser	(A)		
Greater white-fronted goose	Anser albifrons	(A)		
Lesser white-fronted goose	Anser erythropus	(A)		
Taiga bean-goose	Anser fabalis	(A)		
Tundra bean-goose	Anser serrirostris	(A)		
Brant	Branta bernicla	(A)		
Tundra swan	Cygnus columbianus	(A)		
Ruddy shelduck	Tadorna ferruginea	(A)		
Common shelduck	Tadorna tadorna	(A)		
Cotton pygmy-goose	Nettapus coromandelianus	(A)		
Mandarin duck	Aix galericulata	(A)		
Baikal teal	Sibirionetta formosa	(A)		
Garganey	Spatula querquedula			
Northern shoveler	Spatula clypeata			
Gadwall	Mareca strepera	(A)		
Falcated duck	Mareca falcata	(A)		
Eurasian wigeon	Mareca penelope			
Philippine duck	Anas luzonica	(VU)		
Eastern spot-billed duck	Anas zonorhyncha	(A)		
Mallard	Anas platyrhynchos	(A)		
Northern pintail	Anas acuta			
Green-winged teal	Anas crecca			
Canvasback	Aythya valisineria	(A)		
Common pochard	Aythya ferina	(A)		
Ferruginous duck	Aythya nyroca	(A)		
Baer's pochard	Aythya baeri	(A)		
Tufted duck	Aythya fuligula			
Greater scaup	Aythya marila	(A)		
Scaly-sided merganser	Mergus squamatus	(A)		

== Megapodes ==
Order: Galliformes Family: Megapodiidae

The Megapodiidae are stocky, medium-large chicken-like birds with small heads and large feet. All but the malleefowl occupy jungle habitats and most have brown or black coloring.

Common name	Scientific name	Presence	IUCN	Image
Tabon scrubfowl	Megapodius cumingii			

== Pheasants, grouse, and allies ==
Order: Galliformes Family: Phasianidae

The Phasianidae are a family of terrestrial birds which consists of quails, partridges, snowcocks, francolins, spurfowls, tragopans, monals, pheasants, peafowls and jungle fowls. In general, they are plump (although they vary in size) and have broad, relatively short wings.

Common name	Scientific name	Presence	IUCN	Image
Palawan peacock-pheasant	Polyplectron napoleonis	(E)		
Blue-breasted quail	Coturnix chinensis			
Japanese quail	Coturnix japonica	(A)		
Common quail	Coturnix coturnix	(A)		
Chinese francolin	Francolinus pintadeanus			
Red junglefowl	Gallus gallus			
Daurian partridge	Perdix dauurica			

== Grebes ==
Order: Podicipediformes Family: Podicipedidae

Grebes are small to medium-large freshwater diving birds. They have lobed toes and are excellent swimmers and divers. However, they have their feet placed far back on the body, making them quite ungainly on land.

Common name	Scientific name	Presence	IUCN	Image
Little grebe	Tachybaptus ruficollis			
Eared grebe	Podiceps nigricollis	(A)		

== Pigeons and doves ==
Order: Columbiformes Family: Columbidae

Pigeons and doves are stout-bodied birds with short necks and short slender bills with a fleshy cere.

Common name	Scientific name	Presence	IUCN	Image
Rock pigeon	Columba livia	(I)		
Metallic pigeon	Columba vitiensis			
Oriental turtle-dove	Streptopelia orientalis	(A)		
Philippine collared-dove	Streptopelia dusumieri			
Red collared-dove	Streptopelia tranquebarica			
Spotted dove	Spilopelia chinensis			
Philippine cuckoo-dove	Macropygia tenuirostris			
Asian emerald dove	Chalcophaps indica			
Zebra dove	Geopelia striata	(I)		
Nicobar pigeon	Caloenas nicobarica			
Mindoro bleeding-heart	Gallicolumba platenae	(E)		
Negros bleeding-heart	Gallicolumba keayi	(E)		
Sulu bleeding-heart	Gallicolumba menagei	(E)		
Luzon bleeding-heart	Gallicolumba luzonica	(E)		
Mindanao bleeding-heart	Gallicolumba criniger	(E)		
White-eared brown-dove	Phapitreron leucotis	(E)		
Amethyst brown-dove	Phapitreron amethystina	(E)		
Mindanao brown-dove	Phapitreron brunneiceps	(E)		
Tawitawi brown-dove	Phapitreron cinereiceps	(E)		
Pink-necked green-pigeon	Treron vernans			
Philippine green-pigeon	Treron axillaris			
Thick-billed green-pigeon	Treron curvirostra			
Gray-cheeked green-pigeon	Treron griseicauda			
Whistling green-pigeon	Treron formosae			
Yellow-breasted fruit-dove	Ptilinopus occipitalis	(E)		
Flame-breasted fruit-dove	Ptilinopus marchei	(E)		
Cream-breasted fruit-dove	Ptilinopus merrilli	(E)		
Black-chinned fruit-dove	Ptilinopus leclancheri	(E)		
Superb fruit-dove	Ptilinopus superbus	(A)		
Black-naped fruit-dove	Ptilinopus melanospila			
Negros fruit-dove	Ptilinopus arcanus	(E)		
Pink-bellied imperial-pigeon	Ducula poliocephala	(E)		
Mindoro imperial-pigeon	Ducula mindorensis	(E)		
Spotted imperial-pigeon	Ducula carola	(E)		
Green imperial-pigeon	Ducula aenea			
Gray imperial-pigeon	Ducula pickeringii			
Pied imperial-pigeon	Ducula bicolor			

== Cuckoos ==
Order: Cuculiformes Family: Cuculidae

The family Cuculidae includes cuckoos, roadrunners and anis. These birds are of variable size with slender bodies, long tails and strong legs. The Old World cuckoos are brood parasites.

Common name	Scientific name	Presence	IUCN	Image
Rufous coucal	Centropus unirufus	(E)		
Black-faced coucal	Centropus melanops	(E)		
Black-hooded coucal	Centropus steerii	(E)		
Greater coucal	Centropus sinensis			
Philippine coucal	Centropus viridis	(E)		
Lesser coucal	Centropus bengalensis			
Chestnut-breasted malkoha	Phaenicophaeus curvirostris			
Red-crested malkoha	Dasylophus superciliosus	(E)		
Scale-feathered malkoha	Dasylophus cumingi	(E)		
Chestnut-winged cuckoo	Clamator coromandus			
Pied cuckoo	Clamator jacobinus	(A)		
Asian koel	Eudynamys scolopacea			
Channel-billed cuckoo	Scythrops novaehollandiae	(A)		
Violet cuckoo	Chrysococcyx xanthorhynchus			
Little bronze-cuckoo	Chrysococcyx minutillus			
Banded bay cuckoo	Cacomantis sonneratii	(A)		
Plaintive cuckoo	Cacomantis merulinus			
Brush cuckoo	Cacomantis variolosus			
Asian drongo-cuckoo	Surniculus lugubris			
Philippine drongo-cuckoo	Surniculus velutinus	(E)		
Large hawk-cuckoo	Hierococcyx sparverioides			
Philippine hawk-cuckoo	Hierococcyx pectoralis	(E)		
Indian cuckoo	Cuculus micropterus			
Oriental cuckoo	Cuculus optatus			

== Frogmouths ==
Order: Caprimulgiformes Family: Podargidae

The frogmouths are a group of nocturnal birds related to the nightjars. They are named for their large flattened hooked bill and huge frog-like gape, which they use to take insects.

Common name	Scientific name	Presence	IUCN	Image
Philippine frogmouth	Batrachostomus septimus	(E)		
Palawan frogmouth	Batrachostomus chaseni	(E)		

== Nightjars and allies ==
Order: Caprimulgiformes Family: Caprimulgidae

Nightjars are medium-sized nocturnal birds that usually nest on the ground. They have long wings, short legs and very short bills. Most have small feet, of little use for walking, and long pointed wings. Their soft plumage is camouflaged to resemble bark or leaves.

Common name	Scientific name	Presence	IUCN	Image
Great eared-nightjar	Lyncornis macrotis			
Gray nightjar	Caprimulgus jotaka			
Large-tailed nightjar	Caprimulgus macrurus			
Philippine nightjar	Caprimulgus manillensis	(E)		
Savanna nightjar	Caprimulgus affinis			

== Swifts ==
Order: Apodiformes Family: Apodidae

Swifts are small birds which spend the majority of their lives flying. These birds have very short legs and never settle voluntarily on the ground, perching instead only on vertical surfaces. Many swifts have long swept-back wings which resemble a crescent or boomerang.

Common name	Scientific name	Presence	IUCN	Image
Philippine spinetailed swift	Mearnsia picina	(E)		
White-throated needletail	Hirundapus caudacutus			
Brown-backed needletail	Hirundapus giganteus			
Purple needletail	Hirundapus celebensis			
Pygmy swiftlet	Collocalia troglodytes	(E)		
Gray-rumped swiftlet	Collocalia marginata			
Ridgetop swiftlet	Collocalia isonota			
Philippine swiftlet	Aerodramus mearnsi	(E)		
Whitehead's swiftlet	Aerodramus whiteheadi	(E)		
Ameline swiftlet	Aerodramus amelis			
Mossy-nest swiftlet	Aerodramus salangana			
Black-nest swiftlet	Aerodramus maximus			
White-nest swiftlet	Aerodramus fuciphagus			
Germain's swiftlet	Aerodramus germani			
Pacific swift	Apus pacificus			
House swift	Apus nipalensis			
Asian palm-swift	Cypsiurus balasiensis			

== Treeswifts ==
Order: Caprimulgiformes Family: Hemiprocnidae

The treeswifts, also called crested swifts, are closely related to the true swifts. They differ from the other swifts in that they have crests, long forked tails and softer plumage.

Common name	Scientific name	Presence	IUCN	Image
Gray-rumped treeswift	Hemiprocne longipennis	(A)		
Whiskered treeswift	Hemiprocne comata			

== Rails, gallinules, and coots ==
Order: Gruiformes Family: Rallidae

Rallidae is a large family of small to medium-sized birds which includes the rails, crakes, coots and gallinules. Typically they inhabit dense vegetation in damp environments near lakes, swamps or rivers. In general they are shy and secretive birds, making them difficult to observe. Most species have strong legs and long toes which are well adapted to soft uneven surfaces. They tend to have short, rounded wings and to be weak fliers.

Common name	Scientific name	Presence	IUCN	Image
Slaty-breasted rail	Lewinia striata			
Luzon rail	Lewinia mirifica	(E)		
Calayan rail	Gallirallus calayanensis	(E)		
Buff-banded rail	Gallirallus philippensis			
Barred rail	Gallirallus torquatus			
Eurasian moorhen	Gallinula chloropus			
Eurasian coot	Fulica atra			
Black-backed swamphen	Porphyrio indicus			
Philippine swamphen	Porphyrio pulverulentus	(E)		
Watercock	Gallicrex cinerea			
Plain bush-hen	Amaurornis olivacea	(E)		
White-breasted waterhen	Amaurornis phoenicurus			
White-browed crake	Poliolimnas cinereus			
Red-legged crake	Rallina fasciata			
Slaty-legged crake	Rallina eurizonoides			
Ruddy-breasted crake	Zapornia fusca			
Baillon's crake	Zapornia pusilla			
Spotless crake	Zapornia tabuensis			

== Cranes ==
Order: Gruiformes Family: Gruidae

Cranes are large, long-legged and long-necked birds. Unlike the similar-looking but unrelated herons, cranes fly with necks outstretched, not pulled back. Most have elaborate and noisy courting displays or "dances".

Common name	Scientific name	Presence	IUCN	Image
Demoiselle crane	Anthropoides virgo	(A)		
Sarus crane	Grus antigone			
Hooded crane	Grus monacha	(A)		

== Thick-knees ==
Order: Charadriiformes Family: Burhinidae

The thick-knees are a group of largely tropical waders in the family Burhinidae. They are found worldwide within the tropical zone, with some species also breeding in temperate Europe and Australia. They are medium to large waders with strong black or yellow-black bills, large yellow eyes and cryptic plumage. Despite being classed as waders, most species have a preference for arid or semi-arid habitats.

Common name	Scientific name	Presence	IUCN	Image
Beach thick-knee	Esacus magnirostris			

== Stilts and avocets ==
Order: Charadriiformes Family: Recurvirostridae

Recurvirostridae is a family of large wading birds, which includes the avocets and stilts. The avocets have long legs and long up-curved bills. The stilts have extremely long legs and long, thin, straight bills.

Common name	Scientific name	Presence	IUCN	Image
Black-winged stilt	Himantopus himantopus			
Pied stilt	Himantopus leucocephalus			
Pied avocet	Recurvirostra avosetta	(A)		

== Oystercatchers ==
Order: Charadriiformes Family: Haematopodidae

The oystercatchers are large and noisy plover-like birds, with strong bills used for smashing or prising open molluscs.

Common name	Scientific name	Presence	IUCN	Image
Eurasian oystercatcher	Haematopus ostralegus	(A)		

== Plovers and lapwings ==
Order: Charadriiformes Family: Charadriidae

The family Charadriidae includes the plovers, dotterels and lapwings. They are small to medium-sized birds with compact bodies, short, thick necks and long, usually pointed, wings. They are found in open country worldwide, mostly in habitats near water.

Common name	Scientific name	Presence	IUCN	Image
Black-bellied plover	Pluvialis squatarola			
Pacific golden-plover	Pluvialis fulva			
Northern lapwing	Vanellus vanellus	(A)		
Gray-headed lapwing	Vanellus cinereus	(A)		
Lesser sand-plover	Charadrius mongolus			
Greater sand-plover	Charadrius leschenaultii			
Malaysian plover	Charadrius peronii			
Kentish plover	Charadrius alexandrinus			
Common ringed plover	Charadrius hiaticula	(A)		
Semipalmated plover	Charadrius semipalmatus	(A)		
Long-billed plover	Charadrius placidus	(A)		
Little ringed plover	Charadrius dubius			
Oriental plover	Charadrius veredus			

== Painted-snipes ==
Order: Charadriiformes Family: Rostratulidae

Painted-snipe are short-legged, long-billed birds similar in shape to the true snipes, but more brightly colored.

Common name	Scientific name	Presence	IUCN	Image
Greater painted-snipe	Rostratula benghalensis			

== Jacanas ==
Order: Charadriiformes Family: Jacanidae

The jacanas are a group of tropical waders in the family Jacanidae. They are found throughout the tropics. They are identifiable by their huge feet and claws which enable them to walk on floating vegetation in the shallow lakes that are their preferred habitat.

Common name	Scientific name	Presence	IUCN	Image
Comb-crested jacana	Irediparra gallinacea			
Pheasant-tailed jacana	Hydrophasianus chirurgus			

== Sandpipers and allies ==
Order: Charadriiformes Family: Scolopacidae

Scolopacidae is a large diverse family of small to medium-sized shorebirds including the sandpipers, curlews, godwits, shanks, tattlers, woodcocks, snipes, dowitchers and phalaropes. The majority of these species eat small invertebrates picked out of the mud or soil. Variation in length of legs and bills enables multiple species to feed in the same habitat, particularly on the coast, without direct competition for food.

Common name	Scientific name	Presence	IUCN	Image
Bristle-thighed curlew	Numenius tahitiensis	(A)		
Whimbrel	Numenius phaeopus			
Little curlew	Numenius minutus			
Far Eastern curlew	Numenius madagascariensis			
Eurasian curlew	Numenius arquata			
Bar-tailed godwit	Limosa lapponica			
Black-tailed godwit	Limosa limosa			
Ruddy turnstone	Arenaria interpres			
Great knot	Calidris tenuirostris			
Red knot	Calidris canutus			
Ruff	Calidris pugnax			
Broad-billed sandpiper	Calidris falcinellus			
Sharp-tailed sandpiper	Calidris acuminata			
Curlew sandpiper	Calidris ferruginea			
Temminck's stint	Calidris temminckii			
Long-toed stint	Calidris subminuta			
Spoon-billed sandpiper	Calidris pygmea	(A)		
Red-necked stint	Calidris ruficollis			
Sanderling	Calidris alba			
Dunlin	Calidris alpina	(A)		
Little stint	Calidris minuta	(A)		
Pectoral sandpiper	Calidris melanotos	(A)		
Asian dowitcher	Limnodromus semipalmatus			
Long-billed dowitcher	Limnodromus scolopaceus	(A)		
Jack snipe	Lymnocryptes minimus	(A)		
Bukidnon woodcock	Scolopax bukidnonensis	(E)		
Latham's snipe	Gallinago hardwickii			
Common snipe	Gallinago gallinago			
Pin-tailed snipe	Gallinago stenura			
Swinhoe's snipe	Gallinago megala			
Terek sandpiper	Xenus cinereus			
Red-necked phalarope	Phalaropus lobatus			
Red phalarope	Phalaropus fulicarius	(A)		
Common sandpiper	Actitis hypoleucos			
Green sandpiper	Tringa ochropus			
Gray-tailed tattler	Tringa brevipes			
Spotted redshank	Tringa erythropus	(A)		
Common greenshank	Tringa nebularia			
Nordmann's greenshank	Tringa guttifer			
Marsh sandpiper	Tringa stagnatilis			
Wood sandpiper	Tringa glareola			
Common redshank	Tringa totanus			

== Buttonquail ==
Order: Charadriiformes Family: Turnicidae

The buttonquail are small, drab, running birds which resemble the true quails. The female is the brighter of the sexes and initiates courtship. The male incubates the eggs and tends the young.

Common name	Scientific name	Presence	IUCN	Image
Small buttonquail	Turnix sylvatica			
Spotted buttonquail	Turnix ocellata	(E)		
Barred buttonquail	Turnix suscitator			
Luzon buttonquail	Turnix worcesteri	(E)		

== Pratincoles and coursers ==
Order: Charadriiformes Family: Glareolidae

Glareolidae is a family of wading birds comprising the pratincoles, which have short legs, long pointed wings and long forked tails, and the coursers, which have long legs, short wings and long, pointed bills which curve downwards.

Common name	Scientific name	Presence	IUCN	Image
Oriental pratincole	Glareola maldivarum			

== Skuas and jaegers ==
Order: Charadriiformes Family: Stercorariidae

The family Stercorariidae are, in general, medium to large birds, typically with gray or brown plumage, often with white markings on the wings. They nest on the ground in temperate and arctic regions and are long-distance migrants.

Common name	Scientific name	Presence	IUCN	Image
Pomarine jaeger	Stercorarius pomarinus			
Long-tailed jaeger	Stercorarius longicaudus	(A)		

== Gulls, terns, and skimmers ==
Order: Charadriiformes Family: Laridae

Laridae is a family of medium to large seabirds, the gulls, terns, and skimmers. Gulls are typically gray or white, often with black markings on the head or wings. They have stout, longish bills and webbed feet. Terns are a group of generally medium to large seabirds typically with gray or white plumage, often with black markings on the head. Most terns hunt fish by diving but some pick insects off the surface of fresh water. Terns are generally long-lived birds, with several species known to live in excess of 30 years.

Common name	Scientific name	Presence	IUCN	Image
Saunders's gull	Saundersilarus saundersi	(A)		
Black-headed gull	Chroicocephalus ridibundus			
Little gull	Hydrocoloeus minutus	(A)		
Laughing gull	Leucophaeus atricilla	(A)		
Black-tailed gull	Larus crassirostris			
Common gull	Larus canus	(A)		
Herring gull	Larus argentatus	(A)		
Slaty-backed gull	Larus schistisagus	(A)		
Brown noddy	Anous stolidus			
Black noddy	Anous minutus			
Blue-billed white tern	Gygis candida	(A)		
Sooty tern	Onychoprion fuscatus			
Bridled tern	Onychoprion anaethetus			
Aleutian tern	Onychoprion aleuticus	(A)		
Little tern	Sternula albifrons			
Gull-billed tern	Gelochelidon nilotica			
Caspian tern	Hydroprogne caspia	(A)		
White-winged tern	Chlidonias leucopterus			
Whiskered tern	Chlidonias hybrida			
Roseate tern	Sterna dougallii			
Black-naped tern	Sterna sumatrana			
Common tern	Sterna hirundo			
Great crested tern	Thalasseus bergii			
Chinese crested tern	Thalasseus bernsteini	(A)		

== Tropicbirds ==
Order: Phaethontiformes Family: Phaethontidae

Tropicbirds are slender white birds of tropical oceans with exceptionally long central tail feathers. Their heads and long wings have black markings.

Common name	Scientific name	Presence	IUCN	Image
White-tailed tropicbird	Phaethon lepturus	(A)		
Red-tailed tropicbird	Phaethon rubricauda	(A)		

== Northern storm-petrels ==
Order: Procellariiformes Family: Hydrobatidae

Storm-petrels are small birds which spend most of their lives at sea, coming ashore only to breed. They feed on planktonic crustaceans and small fish picked from the surface, typically while hovering or pattering across the water. Their flight is fluttering and sometimes bat-like.

Common name	Scientific name	Presence	IUCN	Image
Leach's storm-petrel	Hydrobates leucorhous	(A)		
Swinhoe's storm-petrel	Hydrobates monorhis	(A)		

== Shearwaters and petrels ==
Order: Procellariiformes Family: Procellariidae

The procellariids are the main group of medium-sized "true petrels", characterized by united nostrils with medium septum and a long outer functional primary.

Common name	Scientific name	Presence	IUCN	Image
Kermadec petrel	Pterodroma neglecta	(A)		
Hawaiian petrel	Pterodroma sandwichensis	(A)		
Bonin petrel	Pterodroma hypoleuca	(A)		
Bulwer's petrel	Bulweria bulwerii	(A)		
Tahiti petrel	Pseudobulweria rostrata	(A)		
Streaked shearwater	Calonectris leucomelas			
Wedge-tailed shearwater	Ardenna pacificus			
Short-tailed shearwater	Ardenna tenuirostris	(A)		

== Storks ==
Order: Ciconiiformes Family: Ciconiidae

Storks are large, long-legged, long-necked, wading birds with long, stout bills. Storks are mute, but bill-clattering is an important mode of communication at the nest. Their nests can be large and may be reused for many years. Many species are migratory.

Common name	Scientific name	Presence	IUCN	Image
Black stork	Ciconia nigra	(A)		
Asian woolly-necked stork	Ciconia episcopus			
Oriental stork	Ciconia boyciana	(A)		

== Frigatebirds ==
Order: Suliformes Family: Fregatidae

Frigatebirds are large seabirds usually found over tropical oceans. They are large, black-and-white or completely black, with long wings and deeply forked tails. The males have colored inflatable throat pouches. They do not swim or walk and cannot take off from a flat surface. Having the largest wingspan-to-body-weight ratio of any bird, they are essentially aerial, able to stay aloft for more than a week.

Common name	Scientific name	Presence	IUCN	Image
Lesser frigatebird	Fregata ariel			
Christmas Island frigatebird	Fregata andrewsi			
Great frigatebird	Fregata minor			

== Boobies and gannets ==
Order: Suliformes Family: Sulidae

The sulids comprise the gannets and boobies. Both groups are medium to large coastal seabirds that plunge-dive for fish.

Common name	Scientific name	Presence	IUCN	Image
Masked booby	Sula dactylatra			
Brown booby	Sula leucogaster			
Red-footed booby	Sula sula			

== Anhingas ==
Order: Suliformes Family: Anhingidae

Anhingas or darters are often called "snake-birds" because of their long thin neck, which gives a snake-like appearance when they swim with their bodies submerged. The males have black and dark-brown plumage, an erectile crest on the nape and a larger bill than the female. The females have much paler plumage especially on the neck and underparts. The darters have completely webbed feet and their legs are short and set far back on the body. Their plumage is somewhat permeable, like that of cormorants, and they spread their wings to dry after diving.

Common name	Scientific name	Presence	IUCN	Image
Oriental darter	Anhinga melanogaster			

== Cormorants and shags ==
Order: Suliformes Family: Phalacrocoracidae

Phalacrocoracidae is a family of medium to large coastal, fish-eating seabirds that includes cormorants and shags. Plumage coloration varies, with the majority having mainly dark plumage, some species being black-and-white and a few being colorful.

Common name	Scientific name	Presence	IUCN	Image
Great cormorant	Phalacrocorax carbo			

== Pelicans ==
Order: Pelecaniformes Family: Pelecanidae

Pelicans are large water birds with a distinctive pouch under their beak. They have webbed feet with four toes.

Common name	Scientific name	Presence	IUCN	Image
Australian pelican	Pelecanus conspicillatus	(A)		
Spot-billed pelican	Pelecanus philippensis			
Dalmatian pelican	Pelecanus crispus	(A)		

== Herons, egrets, and bitterns ==
Order: Pelecaniformes Family: Ardeidae

The family Ardeidae contains the bitterns, herons and egrets. Herons and egrets are medium to large wading birds with long necks and legs. Bitterns tend to be shorter necked and more wary. Members of Ardeidae fly with their necks retracted, unlike other long-necked birds such as storks, ibises and spoonbills.

Common name	Scientific name	Presence	IUCN	Image
Great bittern	Botaurus stellaris	(A)		
Yellow bittern	Ixobrychus sinensis			
Schrenck's bittern	Ixobrychus eurhythmus			
Cinnamon bittern	Ixobrychus cinnamomeus			
Black bittern	Ixobrychus flavicollis			
Gray heron	Ardea cinerea			
Great-billed heron	Ardea sumatrana			
Purple heron	Ardea purpurea			
Great egret	Ardea alba			
Intermediate egret	Ardea intermedia			
Chinese egret	Egretta eulophotes			
Little egret	Egretta garzetta			
Pacific reef-heron	Egretta sacra			
Eastern cattle egret	Ardea coromanda			
Chinese pond-heron	Ardeola bacchus	(A)		
Javan pond-heron	Ardeola speciosa			
Little heron	Butorides atricapilla			
Black-crowned night-heron	Nycticorax nycticorax			
Nankeen night-heron	Nycticorax caledonicus			
Japanese night-heron	Gorsachius goisagi			
Malayan night-heron	Gorsachius melanolophus			

== Ibises and spoonbills ==
Order: Pelecaniformes Family: Threskiornithidae

Threskiornithidae is a family of large terrestrial and wading birds which includes the ibises and spoonbills. They have long, broad wings with 11 primary and about 20 secondary feathers. They are strong fliers and despite their size and weight, very capable soarers.

Common name	Scientific name	Presence	IUCN	Image
Glossy ibis	Plegadis falcinellus			
Black-headed ibis	Threskiornis melanocephalus	(A)		
Eurasian spoonbill	Platalea leucorodia	(A)		
Black-faced spoonbill	Platalea minor	(A)		

== Osprey ==
Order: Accipitriformes Family: Pandionidae

The family Pandionidae contains only one species, the osprey. The osprey is a medium-large raptor which is a specialist fish-eater with a worldwide distribution.

Common name	Scientific name	Presence	IUCN	Image
Osprey	Pandion haliaetus			

== Hawks, eagles, and kites ==
Order: Accipitriformes Family: Accipitridae

Accipitridae is a family of birds of prey, which includes hawks, eagles, kites, harriers and Old World vultures. These birds have powerful hooked beaks for tearing flesh from their prey, strong legs, powerful talons and keen eyesight.

Common name	Scientific name	Presence	IUCN	Image
Black-winged kite	Elanus caeruleus			
Philippine honey-buzzard	Pernis steerei	(E)		
Oriental honey-buzzard	Pernis ptilorhynchus			
Jerdon's baza	Aviceda jerdoni			
Cinereous vulture	Aegypius monachus	(A)		
Crested serpent-eagle	Spilornis cheela			
Philippine serpent-eagle	Spilornis holospilus	(E)		
Philippine eagle	Pithecophaga jefferyi	(E)		
Changeable hawk-eagle	Nisaetus cirrhatus			
Philippine hawk-eagle	Nisaetus philippensis	(E)		
Pinsker's hawk-eagle	Nisaetus pinskeri	(E)		
Rufous-bellied eagle	Lophotriorchis kienerii			
Gray-faced buzzard	Butastur indicus			
Eastern marsh-harrier	Circus spilonotus			
Pied harrier	Circus melanoleucos	(A)		
Crested goshawk	Accipiter trivirgatus			
Shikra	Accipiter badius	(A)		
Chinese sparrowhawk	Accipiter soloensis			
Japanese sparrowhawk	Accipiter gularis			
Besra	Accipiter virgatus			
Eurasian sparrowhawk	Accipiter nisus	(A)		
Black kite	Milvus migrans	(A)		
Brahminy kite	Haliastur indus			
White-bellied sea-eagle	Haliaeetus leucogaster			
Gray-headed fish-eagle	Haliaeetus ichthyaetus			
Eastern buzzard	Buteo japonicus			

== Barn-owls ==
Order: Strigiformes Family: Tytonidae

Barn owls are medium to large owls with large heads and characteristic heart-shaped faces. They have long strong legs with powerful talons.

Common name	Scientific name	Presence	IUCN	Image
Australasian grass-owl	Tyto longimembris			
Oriental bay-owl	Phodilus badius			

== Owls ==
Order: Strigiformes Family: Strigidae

The typical owls are small to large solitary nocturnal birds of prey. They have large forward-facing eyes and ears, a hawk-like beak and a conspicuous circle of feathers around each eye called a facial disk.

Common name	Scientific name	Presence	IUCN	Image
Collared scops-owl	Otus rufescens			
Giant scops-owl	Otus gurneyi	(E)		
Palawan scops-owl	Otus fuliginosus	(E)		
Philippine scops-owl	Otus megalotis	(E)		
Everett's scops-owl	Otus everetti	(E)		
Negros scops-owl	Otus nigrorum	(E)		
Mindoro scops-owl	Otus mindorensis	(E)		
Mantanani scops-owl	Otus mantananensis	(E)		
Ryukyu scops-owl	Otus elegans			
Mindanao scops-owl	Otus mirus	(E)		
Luzon scops-owl	Otus longicornis	(E)		
Philippine eagle-owl	Bubo philippensis	(E)		
Spotted wood-owl	Strix seloputo			
Short-eared owl	Asio flammeus			
Brown boobook	Ninox scutulata			
Northern boobook	Ninox japonica			
Chocolate boobook	Ninox randi	(E)		
Luzon boobook	Ninox philippensis			
Mindanao boobook	Ninox spilocephala	(E)		
Mindoro boobook	Ninox mindorensis	(E)		
Romblon boobook	Ninox spilonotus	(E)		
Cebu boobook	Ninox rumseyi	(E)		
Camiguin boobook	Ninox leventisi	(E)		
Sulu boobook	Ninox reyi	(E)		

== Trogons ==
Order: Trogoniformes Family: Trogonidae

The family Trogonidae includes trogons and quetzals. Found in tropical woodlands worldwide, they feed on insects and fruit, and their broad bills and weak legs reflect their diet and arboreal habits. Although their flight is fast, they are reluctant to fly any distance. Trogons have soft, often colorful, feathers with distinctive male and female plumage.

Common name	Scientific name	Presence	IUCN	Image
Philippine trogon	Harpactes ardens	(E)		

== Hoopoes ==
Order: Bucerotiformes Family: Upupidae

Hoopoes have black, white and orangey-pink coloring with a large erectile crest on their head.

Common name	Scientific name	Presence	IUCN	Image
Eurasian hoopoe	Upupa epops	(A)		

== Hornbills ==
Order: Bucerotiformes Family: Bucerotidae

Hornbills are a group of birds whose bill is shaped like a cow's horn, but without a twist, sometimes with a casque on the upper mandible. Frequently, the bill is brightly colored. All ten of the Philippine hornbills are endemic.

Common name	Scientific name	Presence	IUCN	Image
Rufous hornbill	Buceros hydrocorax	(E)		
Sulu hornbill	Anthracoceros montani	(E)		
Palawan hornbill	Anthracoceros marchei	(E)		
Writhe-billed hornbill	Rhabdotorrhinus waldeni	(E)		
Writhed hornbill	Rhabdotorrhinus leucocephalus	(E)		
Visayan hornbill	Penelopides panini	(E)		
Luzon hornbill	Penelopides manillae	(E)		
Mindoro hornbill	Penelopides mindorensis	(E)		
Samar hornbill	Penelopides samarensis	(E)		
Mindanao hornbill	Penelopides affinis	(E)		

== Kingfishers ==
Order: Coraciiformes Family: Alcedinidae

Kingfishers are medium-sized birds with large heads, long, pointed bills, short legs, and stubby tails.

Common name	Scientific name	Presence	IUCN	Image
Common kingfisher	Alcedo atthis			
Blue-eared kingfisher	Alcedo meninting			
Indigo-banded kingfisher	Ceyx cyanopectus	(E)		
Northern silvery-kingfisher	Ceyx flumenicola	(E)		
Southern silvery-kingfisher	Ceyx argentatus	(E)		
Black-backed dwarf-kingfisher	Ceyx erithaca	(A)		
Rufous-backed dwarf-kingfisher	Ceyx rufidorsa			
Philippine dwarf-kingfisher	Ceyx melanurus	(E)		
Dimorphic dwarf-kingfisher	Ceyx margaethae	(E)		
Stork-billed kingfisher	Pelargopsis capensis			
Ruddy kingfisher	Halcyon coromanda			
Brown-breasted kingfisher	Halcyon gularis	(E)		
Black-capped kingfisher	Halcyon pileata			
Rufous-lored kingfisher	Todirhamphus winchelli	(E)		
Sacred kingfisher	Todirhamphus sanctus	(A)		
Collared kingfisher	Todirhamphus chloris			
Rufous-collared kingfisher	Actenoides concretus			
Spotted kingfisher	Actenoides lindsayi	(E)		
Blue-capped kingfisher	Actenoides hombroni	(E)		

== Bee-eaters ==
Order: Coraciiformes Family: Meropidae

The bee-eaters are a group of near passerine birds in the family Meropidae. Most species are found in Africa but others occur in southern Europe, Madagascar, Australia and New Guinea. They are characterized by richly colored plumage, slender bodies and usually elongated central tail feathers. All are colorful and have long downturned bills and pointed wings, which give them a swallow-like appearance when seen from afar.

Common name	Scientific name	Presence	IUCN	Image
Rufous-crowned bee-eater	Merops americanus	(E)		
Blue-tailed bee-eater	Merops philippinus			

== Rollers ==
Order: Coraciiformes Family: Coraciidae

Rollers resemble crows in size and build, but are more closely related to the kingfishers and bee-eaters. They share the colorful appearance of those groups with blues and browns predominating. The two inner front toes are connected, but the outer toe is not.

Common name	Scientific name	Presence	IUCN	Image
Dollarbird	Eurystomus orientalis			

== Asian barbets ==
Order: Piciformes Family: Megalaimidae

The Asian barbets are plump birds, with short necks and large heads. They get their name from the bristles which fringe their heavy bills. Most species are brightly colored.

Common name	Scientific name	Presence	IUCN	Image
Coppersmith barbet	Psilopogon haemacephalus			

== Woodpeckers ==
Order: Piciformes Family: Picidae

Woodpeckers are small to medium-sized birds with chisel-like beaks, short legs, stiff tails and long tongues used for capturing insects. Some species have feet with two toes pointing forward and two backward, while several species have only three toes. Many woodpeckers have the habit of tapping noisily on tree trunks with their beaks.

Common name	Scientific name	Presence	IUCN	Image
Philippine pygmy woodpecker	Yungipicus maculatus	(E)		
Sulu pygmy woodpecker	Yungipicus ramsayi	(E)		
Luzon flameback	Chrysocolaptes haematribon	(E)		
Yellow-faced flameback	Chrysocolaptes xanthocephalus	(E)		
Buff-spotted flameback	Chrysocolaptes lucidus	(E)		
Red-headed flameback	Chrysocolaptes erythrocephalus	(E)		
Spot-throated flameback	Dinopium everetti	(E)		
Northern sooty woodpecker	Mulleripicus funebris	(E)		
Southern sooty woodpecker	Mulleripicus fuliginosus	(E)		
Great slaty woodpecker	Mulleripicus pulverulentus			
White-bellied woodpecker	Dryocopus javensis			

== Falcons and caracaras ==
Order: Falconiformes Family: Falconidae

Falconidae is a family of diurnal birds of prey. They differ from hawks, eagles and kites in that they kill with their beaks instead of their talons.

Common name	Scientific name	Presence	IUCN	Image
Philippine falconet	Microhierax erythrogenys	(E)		
Eurasian kestrel	Falco tinnunculus			
Spotted kestrel	Falco moluccensis	(A)		
Merlin	Falco columbarius	(A)		
Eurasian hobby	Falco subbuteo	(A)		
Oriental hobby	Falco severus			
Peregrine falcon	Falco peregrinus			

== Cockatoos ==
Order: Psittaciformes Family: Cacatuidae

The cockatoos share many features with other parrots including the characteristic curved beak shape and a zygodactyl foot, with two forward toes and two backwards toes. They differ, however, in a number of characteristics, including the often spectacular movable headcrest.

Common name	Scientific name	Presence	IUCN	Image
Philippine cockatoo	Cacatua haematuropygia	(E)		

== Old World parrots ==
Order: Psittaciformes Family: Psittaculidae

Characteristic features of parrots include a strong curved bill, an upright stance, strong legs, and clawed zygodactyl feet. Many parrots are vividly colored, and some are multi-colored. In size they range from 8 cm (3.1 in) to 1 m (3.3 ft) in length. Old World parrots are found from Africa east across south and southeast Asia and Oceania to Australia and New Zealand.

Common name	Scientific name	Presence	IUCN	Image
Mindanao racquet-tail	Prioniturus waterstradti	(E)		
Luzon racquet-tail	Prioniturus montanus	(E)		
Blue-headed racquet-tail	Prioniturus platenae	(E)		
Mindoro racquet-tail	Prioniturus mindorensis	(E)		
Blue-winged racquet-tail	Prioniturus verticalis	(E)		
Green racquet-tail	Prioniturus luconensis	(E)		
Blue-crowned racquet-tail	Prioniturus discurus	(E)		
Rose-ringed parakeet	Psittacula krameri	(I)		
Great-billed parrot	Tanygnathus megalorynchos			
Blue-naped parrot	Tanygnathus lucionensis			
Azure-rumped parrot	Tanygnathus sumatranus			
Guaiabero	Bolbopsittacus lunulatus	(E)		
Mindanao lorikeet	Saudareos johnstoniae	(E)		
Philippine hanging-parrot	Loriculus philippensis	(E)		
Camiguin hanging-parrot	Loriculus camiguinensis	(E)		

== Asian and Grauer's broadbills ==
Order: Passeriformes Family: Eurylaimidae

The broadbills are small, brightly colored birds, which feed on fruit and also take insects in flycatcher fashion, snapping their broad bills. Their habitat is canopies of wet forests.

Common name	Scientific name	Presence	IUCN	Image
Wattled broadbill	Sarcophanops steerii	(E)		
Visayan broadbill	Sarcophanops samarensis	(E)		

== Pittas ==
Order: Passeriformes Family: Pittidae

Pittas are medium-sized by passerine standards and are stocky, with fairly long, strong legs, short tails and stout bills. Many are brightly colored. They spend the majority of their time on wet forest floors, eating snails, insects and similar invertebrates.

Common name	Scientific name	Presence	IUCN	Image
Whiskered pitta	Erythropitta kochi	(E)		
Blue-breasted pitta	Erythropitta erythrogaster	(E)		
Blue-winged pitta	Pitta moluccensis	(A)		
Fairy pitta	Pitta nympha	(A)		
Hooded pitta	Pitta sordida			
Azure-breasted pitta	Pitta steerii	(E)		

== Thornbills and allies ==
Order: Passeriformes Family: Acanthizidae

Thornbills are small passerine birds, similar in habits to the tits.

Common name	Scientific name	Presence	IUCN	Image
Golden-bellied gerygone	Gerygone sulphurea			

== Cuckooshrikes ==
Order: Passeriformes Family: Campephagidae

The cuckooshrikes are small to medium-sized passerine birds. They are predominantly grayish with white and black, although some species are brightly colored.

Common name	Scientific name	Presence	IUCN	Image
Fiery minivet	Pericrocotus igneus			
Scarlet minivet	Pericrocotus flammeus			
Ashy minivet	Pericrocotus divaricatus			
Bar-bellied cuckooshrike	Coracina striata			
McGregor's cuckooshrike	Coracina mcgregori	(E)		
Black-and-white triller	Lalage melanoleuca	(E)		
Pied triller	Lalage nigra			
Black-winged cuckooshrike	Lalage melaschistos	(A)		
Blackish cuckooshrike	Analisoma coerulescens	(E)		
White-winged cuckooshrike	Analisoma ostenta	(E)		
Black-bibbed cuckooshrike	Edolisoma mindanense	(E)		

== Whistlers and allies ==
Order: Passeriformes Family: Pachycephalidae

The family Pachycephalidae includes the whistlers, shrikethrushes, and some of the pitohuis.

Common name	Scientific name	Presence	IUCN	Image
Yellow-bellied whistler	Pachycephala philippinensis	(E)		
Mangrove whistler	Pachycephala cinerea			
Green-backed whistler	Pachycephala albiventris	(E)		
White-vented whistler	Pachycephala homeyeri	(E)		

== Old World orioles ==
Order: Passeriformes Family: Oriolidae

The Old World orioles are colorful passerine birds. They are not related to the New World orioles.

Common name	Scientific name	Presence	IUCN	Image
Dark-throated oriole	Oriolus xanthonotus			
White-lored oriole	Oriolus albiloris	(E)		
Philippine oriole	Oriolus steerii	(E)		
Isabela oriole	Oriolus isabellae	(E)		
Black-naped oriole	Oriolus chinensis			

== Woodswallows, bellmagpies, and allies ==
Order: Passeriformes Family: Artamidae

The woodswallows are soft-plumaged, somber-colored passerine birds. They are smooth, agile flyers with moderately large, semi-triangular wings.

Common name	Scientific name	Presence	IUCN	Image
White-breasted woodswallow	Artamus leucorynchus			

== Ioras ==
Order: Passeriformes Family: Aegithinidae

The ioras are bulbul-like birds of open forest or thorn scrub, but whereas that group tends to be drab in coloration, ioras are sexually dimorphic, with the males being brightly plumaged in yellows and greens.

Common name	Scientific name	Presence	IUCN	Image
Common iora	Aegithina tiphia			

== Fantails ==
Order: Passeriformes Family: Rhipiduridae

The fantails are small insectivorous birds which are specialist aerial feeders. There are 7 species which have been recorded in the Philippines.

Common name	Scientific name	Presence	IUCN	Image
Black-and-cinnamon fantail	Rhipidura nigrocinnamomea	(E)		
Mindanao blue-fantail	Rhipidura superciliaris	(E)		
Visayan blue-fantail	Rhipidura samarensis	(E)		
Tablas fantail	Rhipidura sauli	(E)		
Visayan fantail	Rhipidura albiventris	(E)		
Blue-headed fantail	Rhipidura cyaniceps	(E)		
Philippine pied-fantail	Rhipidura nigritorquis	(E)		

== Drongos ==
Order: Passeriformes Family: Dicruridae

The drongos are mostly black or dark gray in color, sometimes with metallic tints. They have long forked tails, and some Asian species have elaborate tail decorations. They have short legs and sit very upright when perched, like a shrike. They flycatch or take prey from the ground.

Common name	Scientific name	Presence	IUCN	Image
Black drongo	Dicrurus macrocercus	(A)		
Ashy drongo	Dicrurus leucophaeus			
Crow-billed drongo	Dicrurus annectens	(A)		
Hair-crested drongo	Dicrurus hottentottus			
Balicassiao	Dicrurus balicassius	(E)		
Tablas drongo	Dicrurus menagei	(E)		

== Monarch flycatchers ==
Order: Passeriformes Family: Monarchidae

The monarch flycatchers are small to medium-sized insectivorous passerines which hunt by flycatching.

Common name	Scientific name	Presence	IUCN	Image
Short-crested monarch	Hypothymis helenae	(E)		
Black-naped monarch	Hypothymis azurea			
Celestial monarch	Hypothymis coelestis	(E)		
Blue paradise-flycatcher	Terpsiphone cyanescens	(E)		
Rufous paradise-flycatcher	Terpsiphone cinnamomea			
Japanese paradise-flycatcher	Terpsiphone atrocaudata	(A)		

== Shrikes ==
Order: Passeriformes Family: Laniidae

Shrikes are passerine birds known for their habit of catching other birds and small animals and impaling the uneaten portions of their bodies on thorns. A typical shrike's beak is hooked, like a bird of prey.

Common name	Scientific name	Presence	IUCN	Image
Tiger shrike	Lanius tigrinus	(A)		
Brown shrike	Lanius cristatus			
Long-tailed shrike	Lanius schach			
Mountain shrike	Lanius validirostris	(E)		

== Crows, jays, and magpies ==
Order: Passeriformes Family: Corvidae

The family Corvidae includes crows, ravens, jays, choughs, magpies, treepies, nutcrackers and ground jays. Corvids are above average in size among the Passeriformes, and some of the larger species show high levels of intelligence.

Common name	Scientific name	Presence	IUCN	Image
Palawan crow	Corvus pusillus	(E)		
Sierra Madre crow	Corvus sierramadrensis	(E)		
Small crow	Corvus samarensis	(E)		
Philippine jungle crow	Corvus philippinus	(E)		

== Fairy flycatchers ==
Order: Passeriformes Family: Stenostiridae

The fairy flycatchers are a family of small passerine birds classified as a result of recent discoveries in molecular systematics. They are also referred to as stenostirid warblers.

Common name	Scientific name	Presence	IUCN	Image
Citrine canary-flycatcher	Culicicapa helianthea			

== Tits, chickadees, and titmice ==
Order: Passeriformes Family: Paridae

The Paridae are mainly small stocky woodland species with short stout bills. Some have crests. They are adaptable birds, with a mixed diet including seeds and insects.

Common name	Scientific name	Presence	IUCN	Image
Elegant tit	Pardaliparus elegans	(E)		
Palawan tit	Pardaliparus amabilis	(E)		
White-fronted tit	Sittiparus semilarvatus	(E)		

== Larks ==
Order: Passeriformes Family: Alaudidae

Larks are small terrestrial birds with often extravagant songs and display flights. Most larks are fairly dull in appearance. Their food is insects and seeds. There are 91 species worldwide and 2 species which occur in the Philippines.

Common name	Scientific name	Presence	IUCN	Image
Horsfield's bushlark	Mirafra javanica			
Oriental skylark	Alauda gulgula			

== Cisticolas and allies ==
Order: Passeriformes Family: Cisticolidae

The Cisticolidae are warblers found mainly in warmer southern regions of the Old World. They are generally very small birds of drab brown or gray appearance found in open country such as grassland or scrub.

Common name	Scientific name	Presence	IUCN	Image
Leyte plumed-warbler	Micromacronus leytensis	(E)		
Mindanao plumed-warbler	Micromacronus sordidus	(E)		
Rufous-fronted tailorbird	Orthotomus frontalis	(E)		
Ashy tailorbird	Orthotomus ruficeps			
Rufous-tailed tailorbird	Orthotomus sericeus			
Visayan tailorbird	Orthotomus castaneiceps	(E)		
Gray-backed tailorbird	Orthotomus derbianus	(E)		
Green-backed tailorbird	Orthotomus chloronotus	(E)		
Yellow-breasted tailorbird	Orthotomus samarensis	(E)		
White-browed tailorbird	Orthotomus nigriceps	(E)		
White-eared tailorbird	Orthotomus cinereiceps	(E)		
Zitting cisticola	Cisticola juncidis			
Golden-headed cisticola	Cisticola exilis			

== Reed warblers and allies ==
Order: Passeriformes Family: Acrocephalidae

The members of this family are usually rather large for "warblers". Most are rather plain olivaceous brown above with much yellow to beige below. They are usually found in open woodland, reedbeds, or tall grass. The family occurs mostly in southern to western Eurasia and surroundings, but it also ranges far into the Pacific, with some species in Africa.

Common name	Scientific name	Presence	IUCN	Image
Black-browed reed warbler	Acrocephalus bistrigiceps	(A)		
Streaked reed warbler	Acrocephalus sorghophilus			
Oriental reed warbler	Acrocephalus orientalis			
Clamorous reed warbler	Acrocephalus stentoreus			

== Grassbirds and allies ==
Order: Passeriformes Family: Locustellidae

Locustellidae are a family of small insectivorous songbirds found mainly in Eurasia, Africa, and the Australian region. They are smallish birds with tails that are usually long and pointed, and tend to be drab brownish or buffy all over.

Common name	Scientific name	Presence	IUCN	Image	
Cordillera ground-warbler	Robsonius rabori	(E)			
Sierra Madre ground-warbler	Robsonius thompsoni	(E)			
Bicol ground-warbler	Robsonius sorsogonensis	(E)			
Tawny grassbird	Cincloramphus timoriensis				
Striated grassbird	Megalurus palustris				
Gray's grasshopper warbler	Helopsaltes fasciolatus				
Sakhalin grasshopper warbler	Helopsaltes amnicola			[[File:Locustella amnicola Hokkaido Japan.jpg	250px]]
Pallas's grasshopper warbler	Helopsaltes certhiola	(A)			
Middendorff's grasshopper warbler	Helopsaltes ochotensis				
Lanceolated warbler	Locustella lanceolata				
Long-tailed bush warbler	Locustella caudatus	(E)			
Benguet bush warbler	Locustella seebohmi	(E)			

== Swallows ==
Order: Passeriformes Family: Hirundinidae

The family Hirundinidae is adapted to aerial feeding. They have a slender streamlined body, long pointed wings and a short bill with a wide gape. The feet are adapted to perching rather than walking, and the front toes are partially joined at the base.

Common name	Scientific name	Presence	IUCN	Image
Gray-throated martin	Riparia chinensis			
Bank swallow	Riparia riparia			
Barn swallow	Hirundo rustica			
Pacific swallow	Hirundo tahitica			
Striated swallow	Cecropis striolata			
Asian house-martin	Delichon dasypus	(A)		

== Bulbuls ==
Order: Passeriformes Family: Pycnonotidae

Bulbuls are medium-sized songbirds. Some are colorful with yellow, red or orange vents, cheeks, throats or supercilia, but most are drab, with uniform olive-brown to black plumage. Some species have distinct crests.

Common name	Scientific name	Presence	IUCN	Image
Yellow-wattled bulbul	Brachypodius urostictus	(E)		
Black-headed bulbul	Brachypodius melanocephalos			
Light-vented bulbul	Pycnonotus sinensis	(A)		
Yellow-vented bulbul	Pycnonotus goiavier			
Olive-winged bulbul	Pycnonotus plumosus			
Ashy-fronted bulbul	Pycnonotus cinereifrons	(E)		
Gray-throated bulbul	Alophoixus frater	(E)		
Sulphur-bellied bulbul	Iole palawanensis	(E)		
Black bulbul	Hypsipetes leucocephalus	(A)		
Brown-eared bulbul	Hypsipetes amaurotis			
Visayan bulbul	Hypsipetes guimarasensis	(E)		
Zamboanga bulbul	Hypsipetes rufigularis	(E)		
Yellowish bulbul	Hypsipetes everetti	(E)		
Mindoro bulbul	Hypsipetes mindorensis	(E)		
Streak-breasted bulbul	Hypsipetes siquijorensis	(E)		
Philippine bulbul	Hypsipetes philippinus			

== Leaf warblers ==
Order: Passeriformes Family: Phylloscopidae

Leaf warblers are a family of small insectivorous birds found mostly in Eurasia and ranging into Wallacea and Africa. The species are of various sizes, often green-plumaged above and yellow below, or more subdued with greyish-green to greyish-brown colors.

Common name	Scientific name	Presence	IUCN	Image
Yellow-browed warbler	Phylloscopus inornatus	(A)		
Radde's warbler	Phylloscopus schwarzi	(A)		
Dusky warbler	Phylloscopus fuscatus	(A)		
Willow warbler	Phylloscopus trochilus	(A)		
Lemon-throated leaf warbler	Phylloscopus cebuensis	(E)		
Philippine leaf warbler	Phylloscopus olivaceus	(E)		
Ijima's leaf warbler	Phylloscopus ijimae			
Japanese leaf warbler	Phylloscopus xanthodryas			
Arctic warbler	Phylloscopus borealis			
Kamchatka leaf warbler	Phylloscopus examinandus			
Yellow-breasted warbler	Phylloscopus montis			
Negros leaf warbler	Phylloscopus nigrorum	(E)		

== Bush warblers and allies ==
Order: Passeriformes Family: Scotocercidae

The members of this family are found throughout Africa, Asia, and Polynesia. Their taxonomy is in flux, and some authorities place some genera in other families.

Common name	Scientific name	Presence	IUCN	Image
Asian stubtail	Urosphena squameiceps	(A)		
Yellow-bellied warbler	Abroscopus superciliaris			
Mountain tailorbird	Phyllergates cucullatus			
Rufous-headed tailorbird	Phyllergates heterolaemus	(E)		
Philippine bush warbler	Horornis seebohmi	(E)		
Japanese bush warbler	Horornis diphone			
Manchurian bush warbler	Horornis borealis			
Aberrant bush warbler	Horornis flavolivaceus			

== White-eyes, yuhinas, and allies ==
Order: Passeriformes Family: Zosteropidae

The white-eyes are small and mostly undistinguished, their plumage above being generally some dull color like greenish-olive, but some species have a white or bright yellow throat, breast or lower parts, and several have buff flanks. As their name suggests, many species have a white ring around each eye.

- Chestnut-faced babbler, Zosterornis whiteheadi (E)
- Luzon striped-babbler, Zosterornis striatus (E)
- Panay striped-babbler, Zosterornis latistriatus (E)
- Negros striped-babbler, Zosterornis nigrorum (E)
- Palawan striped-babbler, Zosterornis hypogrammicus (E)
- Mindanao white-eye, Heleia goodfellowi (E)
- Golden-crowned babbler, Sterrhoptilus dennistouni (E)
- Black-crowned babbler, Sterrhoptilus nigrocapitatus (E)
- Rusty-crowned babbler, Sterrhoptilus capitalis (E)
- Flame-templed babbler, Dasycrotapha speciosa (E)
- Visayan pygmy-babbler, Dasycrotapha pygmaea (E)
- Mindanao pygmy-babbler, Dasycrotapha plateni (E)
- Warbling white-eye, Zosterops japonicus
- Lowland white-eye, Zosterops meyeni (E)
- Everett's white-eye, Zosterops everetti
- Yellowish white-eye, Zosterops nigrorum (E)

== Tree-babblers, scimitar-babblers, and allies ==
Order: Passeriformes Family: Timaliidae

The babblers, or timaliids, are somewhat diverse in size and coloration, but are characterized by soft fluffy plumage.

- Pin-striped tit-babbler, Macronus gularis
- Bold-striped tit-babbler, Macronus bornensis
- Brown tit-babbler, Macronus striaticeps (E)

== Ground babblers and allies ==
Order: Passeriformes Family: Pellorneidae

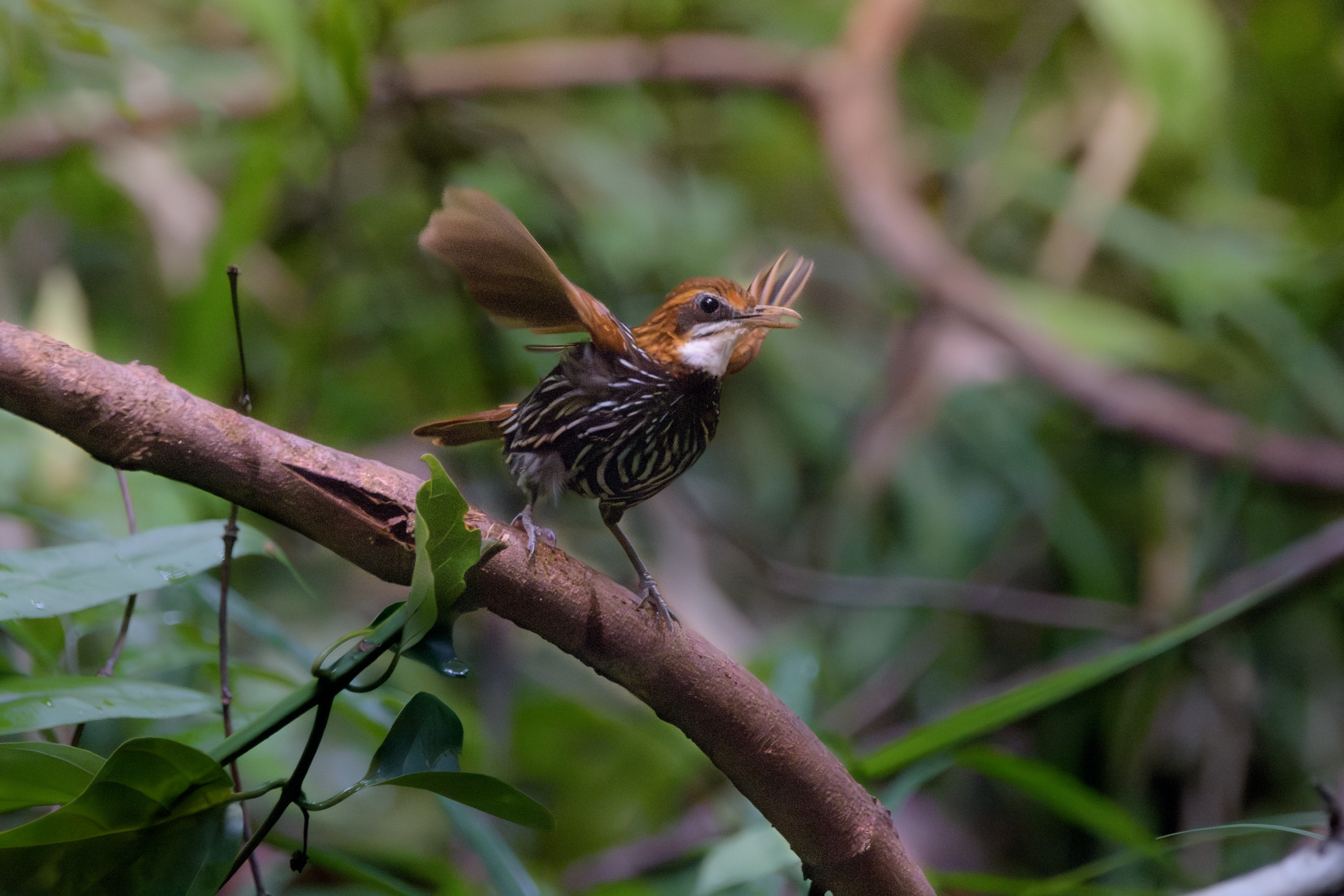
Falcated wren-babbler,Ptilocichla falcata

These small to medium-sized songbirds have soft fluffy plumage but are otherwise rather diverse. Members of the genus Illadopsis are found in forests, but some other genera are birds of scrublands.

- Palawan babbler, Malacopteron palawanense (E)
- Ashy-headed babbler, Malacocincla cinereiceps (E)
- Striated wren-babbler, Ptilocichla mindanensis (E)
- Falcated wren-babbler, Ptilocichla falcata (E)

== Nuthatches ==
Order: Passeriformes Family: Sittidae

Nuthatches are small woodland birds. They have the unusual ability to climb down trees head first, unlike other birds which can only go upwards. Nuthatches have big heads, short tails and powerful bills and feet.

- Velvet-fronted nuthatch, Sitta frontalis
- Sulphur-billed nuthatch, Sitta oenochlamys (E)

== Starlings ==
Order: Passeriformes Family: Sturnidae

Starlings are small to medium-sized passerine birds. Their flight is strong and direct and they are very gregarious. Their preferred habitat is fairly open country. They eat insects and fruit. Plumage is typically dark with a metallic sheen.

- Stripe-sided rhabdornis, Rhabdornis mysticalis (E)
- Long-billed rhabdornis, Rhabdornis grandis (E)
- Stripe-breasted rhabdornis, Rhabdornis inornatus
- Visayan rhabdornis, Rhabdornis rabori (E)
- Asian glossy starling, Aplonis panayensis
- Short-tailed starling, Aplonis minor
- Apo myna, Basilornis miranda (E)
- Coleto, Sarcops calvus (E)
- Common hill myna, Gracula religiosa
- European starling, Sturnus vulgaris (A)
- Rosy starling, Pastor roseus (A)
- Daurian starling, Agropsar sturninus (A)
- Chestnut-cheeked starling, Agropsar philippensis
- White-shouldered starling, Sturnia sinensis (A)
- Chestnut-tailed starling, Sturnia malabarica (A)
- Red-billed starling, Spodiopsar sericeus (A)
- White-cheeked starling, Spodiopsar cineraceus (A)
- Common myna, Acridotheres tristis (A)
- Crested myna, Acridotheres cristatellus (I)

== Thrushes and allies ==
Order: Passeriformes Family: Turdidae

The thrushes are a group of passerine birds that occur mainly in the Old World. They are plump, soft plumaged, small to medium-sized insectivores or sometimes omnivores, often feeding on the ground. Many have attractive songs.

- Sunda thrush, Zoothera andromedae
- White's thrush, Zoothera aurea
- Siberian thrush, Geokichla sibirica (A)
- Ashy thrush, Geokichla cinerea (E)
- Chestnut-capped thrush, Geokichla interpres
- Chinese blackbird, Turdus mandarinus (A)
- Eyebrowed thrush, Turdus obscurus
- Brown-headed thrush, Turdus chrysolaus
- Pale thrush, Turdus pallidus
- Mindoro island thrush, Turdus mindorensis (E)
- Luzon island thrush, Turdus thomassoni (E)
- Mindanao island thrush, Turdus nigrorum (E)
- Red-throated thrush, Turdus ruficollis (A)
- Dusky thrush, Turdus eunomus (A)
- Naumann's thrush, Turdus naumanni (A)

== Old World flycatchers ==
Order: Passeriformes Family: Muscicapidae

Old World flycatchers are a large group of small passerine birds native to the Old World. They are mainly small arboreal insectivores. The appearance of these birds is highly varied, but they mostly have weak songs and harsh calls.

- Gray-streaked flycatcher, Muscicapa griseisticta
- Dark-sided flycatcher, Muscicapa sibirica
- Ferruginous flycatcher, Muscicapa ferruginea
- Asian brown flycatcher, Muscicapa dauurica
- Ashy-breasted flycatcher, Muscicapa randi (E)
- Spotted flycatcher, Muscicapa striata (A)
- Philippine magpie-robin, Copsychus mindanensis (E)
- White-browed shama, Copsychus luzoniensis (E)
- Visayan shama, Copsychus superciliaris (E)
- White-vented shama, Copsychus niger (E)
- Black shama, Copsychus cebuensis (E)
- Blue-breasted flycatcher, Cyornis herioti (E)
- Palawan blue flycatcher, Cyornis lemprieri (E)
- Mangrove blue flycatcher, Cyornis rufigastra
- Chestnut-tailed jungle flycatcher, Cyornis ruficauda
- Blue-and-white flycatcher, Cyanoptila cyanomelana
- Zappey's flycatcher, Cyanoptila cumatilis
- Verditer flycatcher, Eumyias thalassinus (A)
- Turquoise flycatcher, Eumyias panayensis
- Bagobo robin, Leonardina woodi (E)
- Rusty-flanked jungle-flycatcher, Vauriella insignis (E)
- Negros jungle-flycatcher, Vauriella albigularis (E)
- Mindanao jungle-flycatcher, Vauriella goodfellowi (E)
- Philippine shortwing, Brachypteryx poliogyna (E)
- Siberian blue robin, Larvivora cyane
- Bluethroat, Luscinia svecica (A)
- Siberian rubythroat, Calliope calliope
- Yellow-rumped flycatcher, Ficedula zanthopygia (A)
- Narcissus flycatcher, Ficedula narcissina
- Mugimaki flycatcher, Ficedula mugimaki
- Little pied flycatcher, Ficedula westermanni
- Taiga flycatcher, Ficedula albicilla (A)
- Palawan flycatcher, Ficedula platenae (E)
- Furtive flycatcher, Ficedula disposita (E)
- Little slaty flycatcher, Ficedula basilanica (E)
- Cryptic flycatcher, Ficedula crypta (E)
- Bundok flycatcher, Ficedula luzoniensis (E)
- Luzon redstart, Phoenicurus bicolor (E)
- Daurian redstart, Phoenicurus auroreus (A)
- Blue rock-thrush, Monticola solitarius
- Snowy-browed flycatcher, Ficedula hyperythra
- Amur stonechat, Saxicola stejnegeri
- Pied bushchat, Saxicola caprata
- Northern wheatear, Oenanthe oenanthe (A)

== Waxwings ==
Order: Passeriformes Family: Bombycillidae

The waxwings are a group of passerine birds with soft silky plumage and unique red tips to some of the wing feathers. These tips look like sealing wax and give the group its name. These are arboreal birds of northern forests. They live on insects in summer and berries in winter.

- Japanese waxwing, Bombycilla japonica (A)

== Flowerpeckers ==
Order: Passeriformes Family: Dicaeidae

The flowerpeckers are very small, stout, often brightly colored birds, with short tails, short thick curved bills and tubular tongues.

- Olive-backed flowerpecker, Prionochilus olivaceus (E)
- Palawan flowerpecker, Prionochilus plateni (E)
- Thick-billed flowerpecker, Dicaeum agile
- Whiskered flowerpecker, Dicaeum proprium (E)
- Olive-capped flowerpecker, Dicaeum nigrilore (E)
- Flame-crowned flowerpecker, Dicaeum anthonyi (E)
- Bicolored flowerpecker, Dicaeum bicolor (E)
- Cebu flowerpecker, Dicaeum quadricolor (E)
- Red-keeled flowerpecker, Dicaeum australe (E)
- Black-belted flowerpecker, Dicaeum haematostictum (E)
- Scarlet-collared flowerpecker, Dicaeum retrocinctum (E)
- Orange-bellied flowerpecker, Dicaeum trigonostigma
- White-bellied flowerpecker, Dicaeum hypoleucum (E)
- Pygmy flowerpecker, Dicaeum pygmaeum (E)
- Fire-breasted flowerpecker, Dicaeum ignipectus

== Sunbirds and spiderhunters ==
Order: Passeriformes Family: Nectariniidae

The sunbirds and spiderhunters are very small passerine birds which feed largely on nectar, although they will also take insects, especially when feeding young. Flight is fast and direct on their short wings. Most species can take nectar by hovering like a hummingbird, but usually perch to feed.

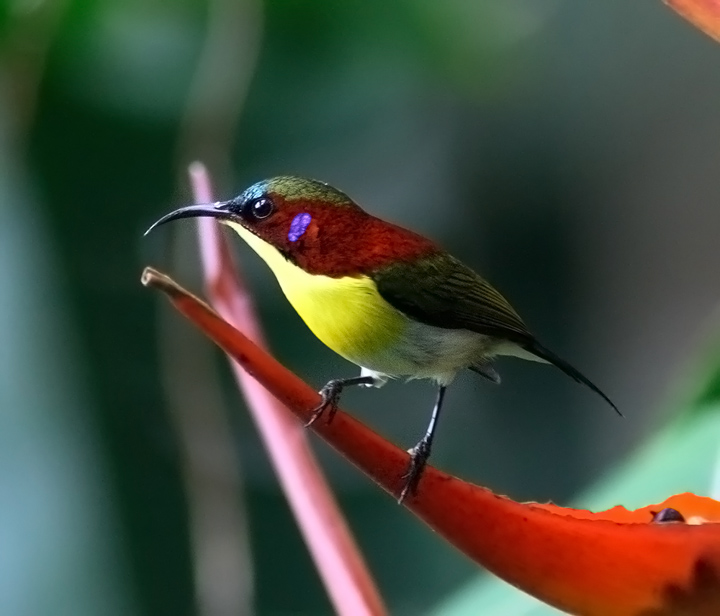
Handsome sunbird, Aethopyga bella

- Brown-throated sunbird, Anthreptes malacensis
- Gray-throated sunbird, Anthreptes griseigularis
- Purple-throated sunbird, Leptocoma sperata (E)
- Copper-throated sunbird, Leptocoma calcostetha
- Olive-backed sunbird, Cinnyris jugularis
- Lovely sunbird, Aethopyga shelleyi (E)
- Magnificent sunbird, Aethopyga magnifica (E)
- Handsome sunbird, Aethopyga bella (E)
- Flaming sunbird, Aethopyga flagrans
- Maroon-naped sunbird, Aethopyga guimarasensis
- Metallic-winged sunbird, Aethopyga pulcherrima (E)
- Mountain sunbird, Aethopyga jefferyi (E)
- Bohol sunbird, Aethopyga decorosa (E)
- Lina's sunbird, Aethopyga linaraborae (E)
- Gray-hooded sunbird, Aethopyga primigenia (E)
- Apo sunbird, Aethopyga boltoni
- Tboli sunbird, Aethopyga tibolii (E)
- Orange-tufted spiderhunter, Arachnothera flammifera
- Pale spiderhunter, Arachnothera dilutior (E)
- Naked-faced spiderhunter, Arachnothera clarae (E)

== Fairy-bluebirds ==
Order: Passeriformes Family: Irenidae

The fairy-bluebirds are bulbul-like birds of open forest or thorn scrub. The males are dark-blue and the females a duller green.

- Asian fairy-bluebird, Irena puella
- Philippine fairy-bluebird, Irena cyanogaster (E)

== Leafbirds ==
Order: Passeriformes Family: Chloropseidae

The leafbirds are small, bulbul-like birds. The males are brightly plumaged, usually in greens and yellows.

- Philippine leafbird, Chloropsis flavipennis (E)
- Yellow-throated leafbird, Chloropsis palawanensis (E)

== Waxbills and allies ==
Order: Passeriformes Family: Estrildidae

The estrildid finches are small passerine birds of the Old World tropics and Australasia. They are gregarious and often colonial seed eaters with short thick but pointed bills. They are all similar in structure and habits, but have wide variation in plumage colors and patterns.

- Tawny-breasted parrotfinch, Erythrura hyperythra
- Pin-tailed parrotfinch, Erythrura prasina
- Green-faced parrotfinch, Erythrura viridifacies (E)
- Red-eared parrotfinch, Erythrura coloria (E)
- Dusky munia, Lonchura fuscans
- Scaly-breasted munia, Lonchura punctulata
- White-bellied munia, Lonchura leucogastra
- Chestnut munia, Lonchura atricapilla
- Java sparrow, Padda oryzivora (I)

== Old World sparrows ==
Order: Passeriformes Family: Passeridae

Old World sparrows are small passerine birds. In general, sparrows tend to be small, plump, brown or gray birds with short tails and short powerful beaks. Sparrows are seed eaters, but they also consume small insects.

- Cinnamon ibon, Hypocryptadius cinnamomeus (E)
- Eurasian tree sparrow, Passer montanus (I)

== Wagtails and pipits ==
Order: Passeriformes Family: Motacillidae

Motacillidae is a family of small passerine birds with medium to long tails. They include the wagtails, longclaws and pipits. They are slender, ground feeding insectivores of open country.

- Forest wagtail, Dendronanthus indicus
- Gray wagtail, Motacilla cinerea
- Eastern yellow wagtail, Motacilla tschutschensis
- Citrine wagtail, Motacilla citreola (A)
- White wagtail, Motacilla alba
- Richard's pipit, Anthus richardi (A)
- Paddyfield pipit, Anthus rufulus
- Olive-backed pipit, Anthus hodgsoni
- Pechora pipit, Anthus gustavi
- Red-throated pipit, Anthus cervinus
- American pipit, Anthus rubescens (A)

== Finches, euphonias, and allies ==
Order: Passeriformes Family: Fringillidae

Finches are seed-eating passerine birds, that are small to moderately large and have a strong beak, usually conical and in some species very large. All have twelve tail feathers and nine primaries. These birds have a bouncing flight with alternating bouts of flapping and gliding on closed wings, and most sing well.

- Brambling, Fringilla montifringilla (A)
- Hawfinch, Coccothraustes coccothraustes (A)
- Yellow-billed grosbeak, Eophona migratoria (A)
- Japanese grosbeak, Eophona personata (A)
- Common rosefinch, Carpodacus erythrinus (A)
- White-cheeked bullfinch, Pyrrhula leucogenis (E)
- Red crossbill, Loxia curvirostra
- Mountain serin, Chrysocorythus estherae
- Eurasian siskin, Spinus spinus (A)

== Longspurs and snow buntings ==
Order: Passeriformes Family: Calcariidae

The Calcariidae are a group of passerine birds which had been traditionally grouped with the New World sparrows, but differ in a number of respects and are usually found in open grassy areas.

- Lapland longspur, Calcarius lapponicus (A)

== Old World buntings ==
Order: Passeriformes Family: Emberizidae

The emberizids are a large family of passerine birds. They are seed-eating birds with distinctively shaped bills. Many emberizid species have distinctive head patterns.

- Black-headed bunting, Emberiza melanocephala (A)
- Chestnut-eared bunting, Emberiza fucata (A)
- Yellow-breasted bunting, Emberiza aureola (A)
- Little bunting, Emberiza pusilla (A)
- Yellow bunting, Emberiza sulphurata
- Black-faced bunting, Emberiza spodocephala (A)

== See also ==
- List of birds
- Lists of birds by region
