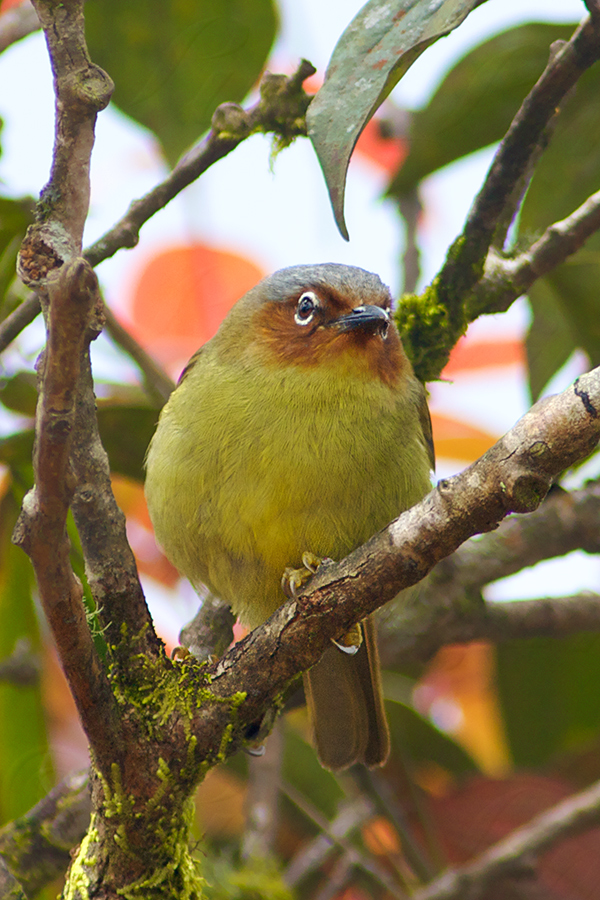

Conservation status
- Least Concern (IUCN 3.1)

Scientific classification
- Kingdom: Animalia
- Phylum: Chordata
- Class: Aves
- Order: Passeriformes
- Family: Zosteropidae
- Genus: Zosterornis
- Species: Z. whiteheadi

Binomial name
- Zosterornis whiteheadi Ogilvie-Grant, 1894

Synonyms
- Stachyris whiteheadi

= Chestnut-faced babbler =

Species of bird

The chestnut-faced babbler (Zosterornis whiteheadi) is a species of bird in the white-eye family Zosteropidae. It is endemic to the island of Luzon in the Philippines. The species is generally found in mountain forests, generally above 1000 m (although occasionally down to 100m). It has a wide range of habitats, frequenting broadleaf forests, moist mossy forests, pine forest, open forest, scrub and human modified habitat as well.

== Description and taxonomy ==
The chestnut-faced babbler is a medium-sized babbler, 15cm in length and weighing between 17 and 28 g. The plumage of this species is not sexually dimorphic, and that of juveniles has not been described. They have a chestnut face with a grey crown and nape, and an incomplete white eye ring. The wings and tail are olive-brown and the flanks paler olive, tending towards buff-yellow on the breast. The call is described as rapid, busy and metallic.

=== Subspecies ===
Two subspecies are recognized:

- Z. w. whiteheadi – in northern and central Luzon,
- Z. w. sorsogonensis – southeastern Luzon; similar to nominate but crown and nape are edged in black

Although this species name includes "babbler", it is actually a white-eye.

== Ecology and behavior ==
The species feeds on seeds, fruit, insects (particularly beetles) and spiders. Single birds, pairs or flocks of up to thirty will feed, usually in the lower growth of the forest, but occasionally up to the canopy. Forages in the understory for insects and often joins mixed-species flocks of blue-headed fantails, little pied flycatchers, turquoise flycatchers, green-backed whistlers, Negros leaf warblers and other small birds. Chestnut-faced babbler are known to drink water from pitcher plants.

== Habitat and conservation status ==
It has a wide range of natural habitats are montane mossy forest, pine forest, secondary growth and scrub and even high grass. It generally is more common in higher altitudes above 1,400 meters above sea level but has been seen as low as 100 masl.

Due to its ability to thrive in second growth and human altered habitat, the International Union for Conservation of Nature has assessed this bird as a least-concern species with the population believed to be stable.
