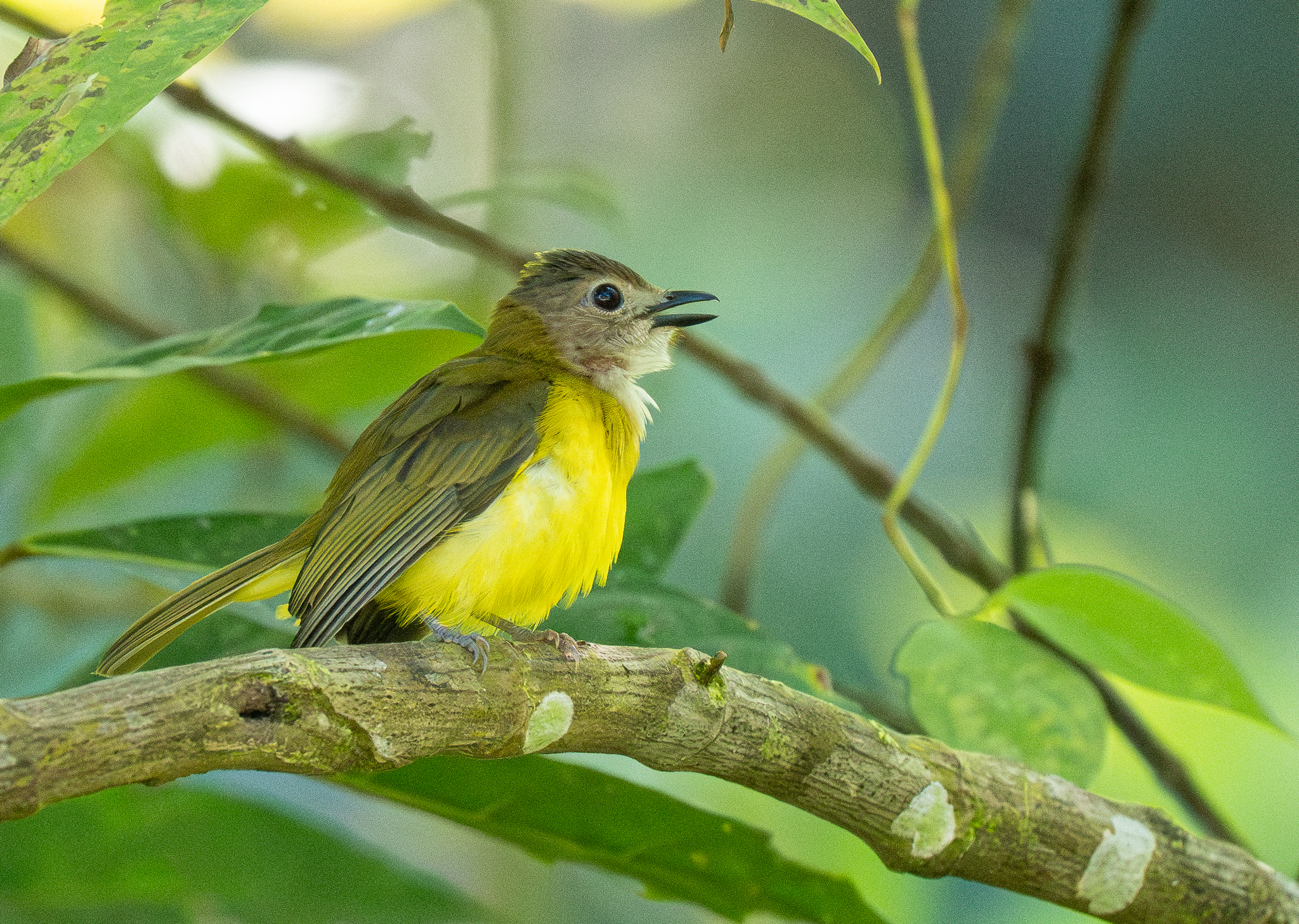

Conservation status
- Least Concern (IUCN 3.1)

Scientific classification
- Kingdom: Animalia
- Phylum: Chordata
- Class: Aves
- Order: Passeriformes
- Family: Pachycephalidae
- Genus: Pachycephala
- Species: P. philippinensis

Binomial name
- Pachycephala philippinensis (Walden, 1872)

Subspecies
- See text

Synonyms
- Hyloterpe philippensis; Hyloterpe philippinensis; Pachycephala philippensis

= Yellow-bellied whistler =

Species of bird

The yellow-bellied whistler (Pachycephala philippinensis), or Philippine whistler, is a species of bird in the family Pachycephalidae that is endemic to the Philippines. Its natural habitats are tropical moist lowland forest and the lower reaches tropical moist montane forest.

== Description and taxonomy ==
=== Subspecies ===
Seven subspecies are recognized:

- P. p. fallax – (McGregor, 1904): Originally described as a separate species. Found on Calayan Island (northern Philippines)
- P. p. illex – (McGregor, 1907): Originally described as a separate species. Found on Camiguin Norte Island (northern Philippines)
- P. p. philippinensis – (Walden, 1872): Found on Luzon and Catanduanes (northern Philippines)
- P. p. siquijorensis – Rand & Rabor, 1957: Found on Siquijor (south-central Philippines)
- P. p. apoensis – (Mearns, 1905): Originally described as a separate species. Found in east-central and southern Philippines
- P. p. basilanica – (Mearns, 1909): Found in Basilan (southwestern Philippines)
- P. p. boholensis – Parkes, 1966: Found in Bohol (south-central Philippines)

== Ecology and behavior ==
Forages in the understory for insects and often joins mixed-species flocks that include Blue-headed fantail, Golden-crowned babbler, Lemon-throated leaf warbler, Black-crowned babbler Little pied flycatcher, Turquoise flycatcher, Negros leaf warbler and other small birds. Adults with enlarged gonads from January to May, nestlings in Apr and nest and eggs in May. Nest is an open cup made out of fine roots and leaves placed 3 meters above understorey.

== Habitat and conservation status ==
This species habitat is primary and secondary forest up to 1,220 metres (4,000 ft) above sea level.

IUCN has assessed this bird as least-concern species despite deforestation in the Philippines continues throughout the country due to slash and burn farming, mining, illegal logging and habitat conversion.

It is found in multiple protected areas such as Bicol Natural Park, Pasonanca Natural Park, Rajah Sikatuna Protected Landscape, Samar Island Natural Park but like all areas in the Philippines, protection is lax and deforestation continues despite this protection on paper.
