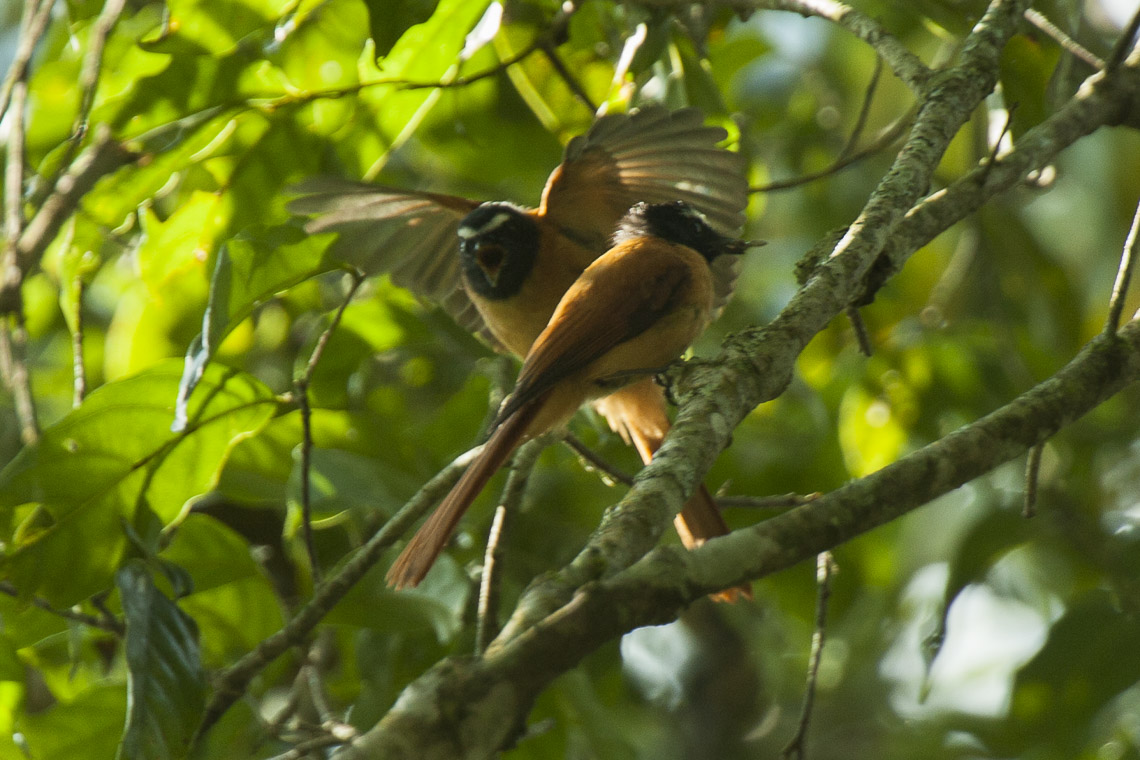

Conservation status
- Least Concern (IUCN 3.1)

Scientific classification
- Kingdom: Animalia
- Phylum: Chordata
- Class: Aves
- Order: Passeriformes
- Family: Rhipiduridae
- Genus: Rhipidura
- Species: R. nigrocinnamomea

Binomial name
- Rhipidura nigrocinnamomea Hartert, 1903

= Black-and-cinnamon fantail =

Species of bird

The black-and-cinnamon fantail (Rhipidura nigrocinnamomea) is a species of bird in the fantail family Rhipiduridae. It is endemic to the island of Mindanao in the Philippines where it is found in the tropical montane forests above 1,000 meters above sea level. The specific name is derived from Latin niger for 'black', and cinnamomeus for 'cinnamon'.

== Description and taxonomy ==
The black-and-cinnamon fantail is 16 cm (6.3 in) long and weighs 10.5–14.5 g (0.37–0.51 oz)

=== Subspecies ===
Two subspecies are recognized:

- R. n. nigrocinnamomea – Found on Central and Southern Mindanao
- R. n. hutchinsoni – Found on North, West and Eastern Mindanao; similar to the nominate but lacks the white on the breast

== Ecology and behavior ==
It forages in the understory for insects and often joins mixed-species flocks that include other montane Mindanao birds that include Cinnamon ibon, Little pied flycatcher, Turquoise flycatcher, Negros leaf warbler and other small birds.

Birds in breeding condition with enlarged gonads have been collected from January to May, which is in line with the general breeding season for most birds in the area.

== Habitat and conservation status ==
The species inhabits forest understorey and edge, second growth and grassy clearings at altitude over 1,000 m. The IUCN has classified the species as being of Least Concern but was formerly listed as near threatened. Despite its limited range, it is said to be locally common. As it occurs in rugged and inaccessible mountains, this has allowed a large portion of its habitat to remain intact. However, there it is still affected by habitat loss through deforestation, mining, land conversion and slash-and-burn - just not to the same extent as lowland forest.

It is found in multiple protected areas such as Mount Apo and Kitanglad Mountain Range but like all areas in the Philippines protection is lax.
