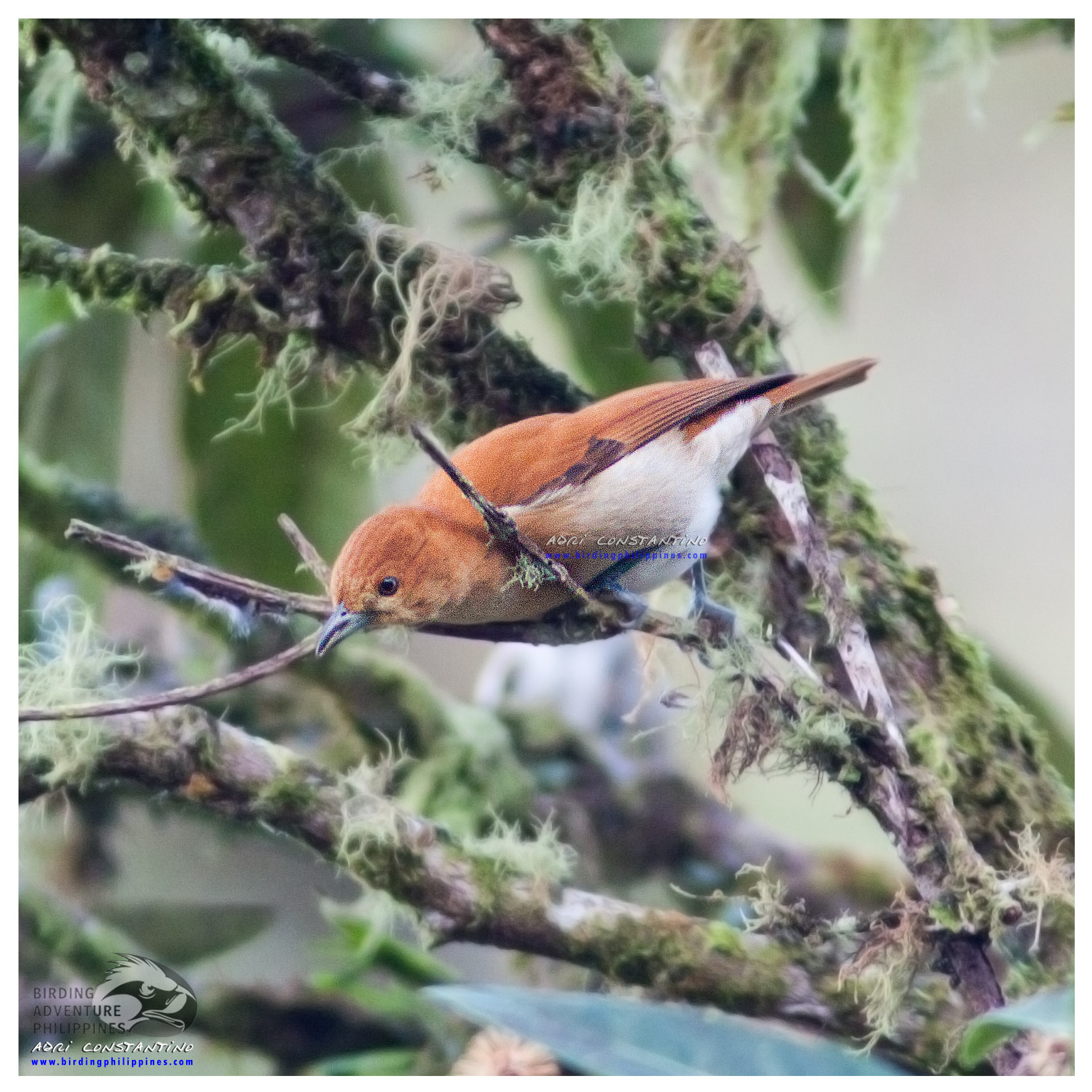

Conservation status
- Least Concern (IUCN 3.1)

Scientific classification
- Kingdom: Animalia
- Phylum: Chordata
- Class: Aves
- Order: Passeriformes
- Family: Passeridae
- Subfamily: Hypocryptadiinae; Hachisuka, 1930
- Genus: Hypocryptadius; Hartert, 1903
- Species: H. cinnamomeus

Binomial name
- Hypocryptadius cinnamomeus Hartert, 1903

= Cinnamon ibon =

Species of bird

The cinnamon ibon (Hypocryptadius cinnamomeus) is a species of bird endemic to the mountains of Mindanao in the Philippines. Monotypic within the genus Hypocryptadius, it is classified as a sparrow. Its natural habitat is tropical moist montane forests and mossy forests above 1,000 metres (3,300 ft).

== Description and taxonomy ==
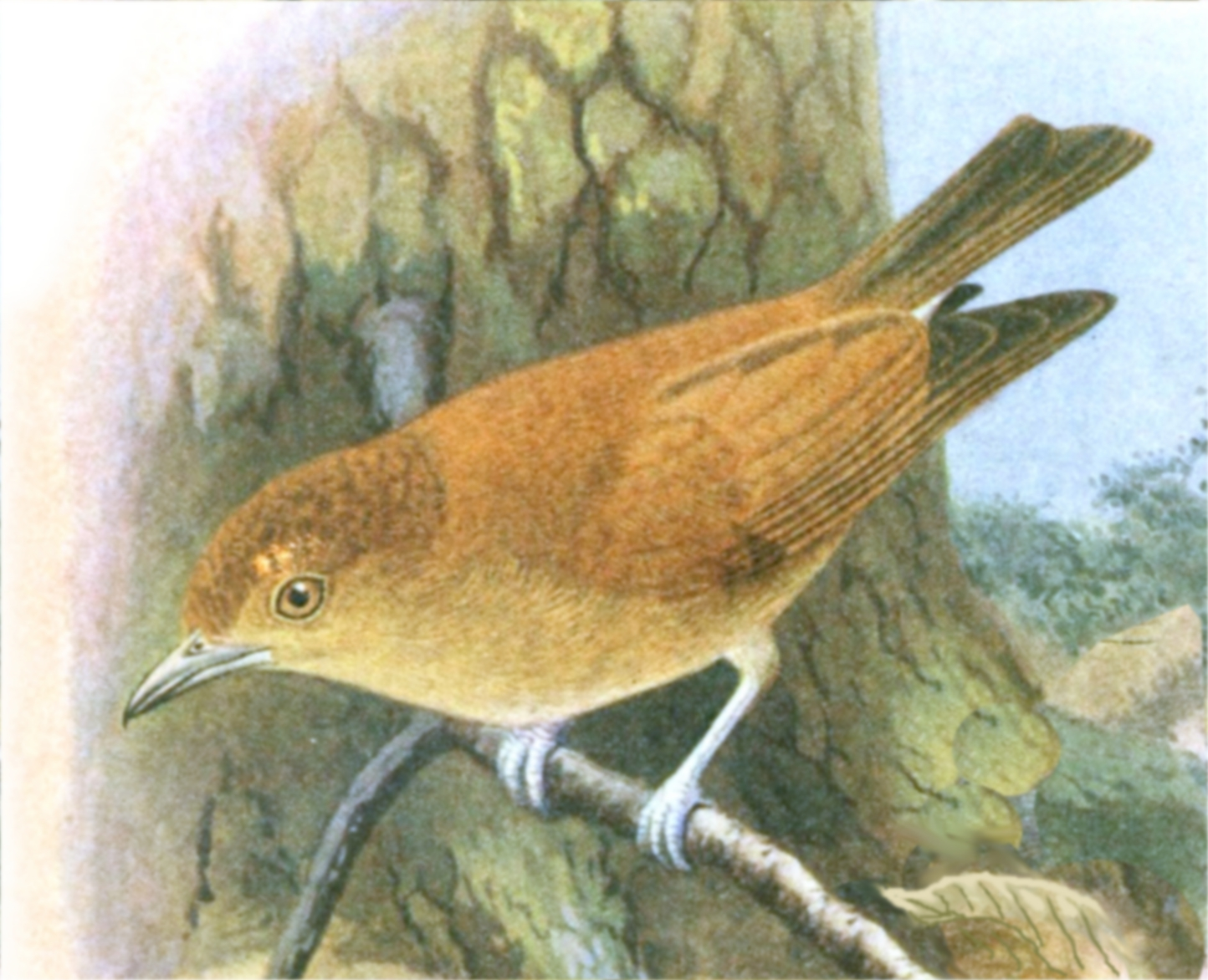
An illustration by H. Goodchild (1906)

Monotypic within the genus Hypocryptadius, it is classified as a sparrow after being tentatively placed in the white-eye family Zosteropidae. It has a skull and bill similar to that of the sparrows, and following a study of its mitochondrial and nuclear DNA as well as skeletal evidence, Jon Fjeldså and colleagues placed the species as the most basal member of that family and a distinct subfamily.

== Ecology and behavior ==
Forages in the understory for insects and often joins mixed-species flocks that include Black-and-cinnamon fantail, Little pied flycatcher, Turquoise flycatcher, Negros leaf warbler and other small birds.

Nothing has been published about its breeding behaviour. Birds in breeding condition and enlarged gonads have been collected in February to May.

== Habitat and conservation status ==
Its habitat is in tropical moist montane and sub-montane mossy forests and forest edge above 1,000 meters above sea level.

IUCN has assessed this bird as a least-concern species . While it has a limited range, it is supposedly common in areas it is found. However, the population is said to be decreasing. This is due to habitat loss due to legal and illegal logging, mining and conversion into farmlands through Slash-and-burn or other methods.
