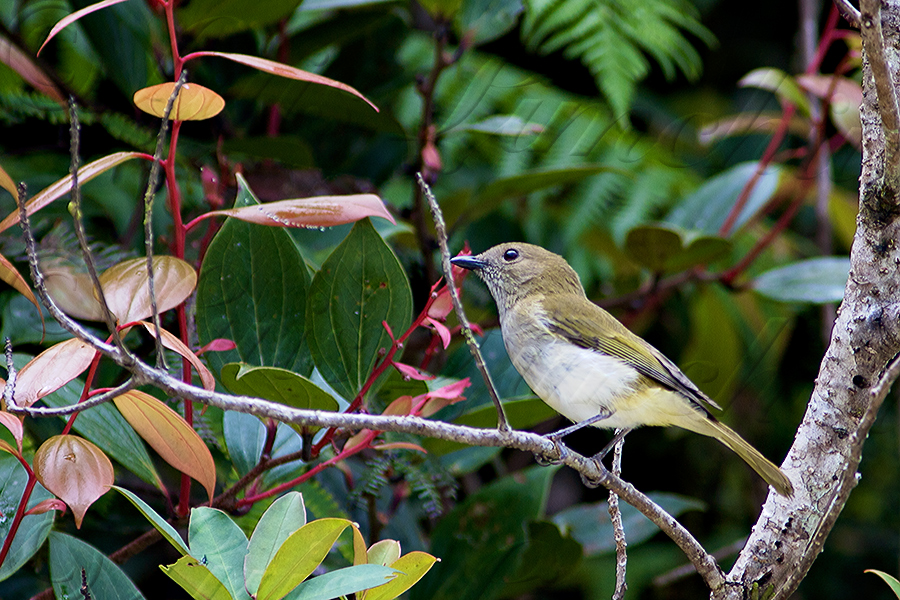

Conservation status
- Least Concern (IUCN 3.1)

Scientific classification
- Kingdom: Animalia
- Phylum: Chordata
- Class: Aves
- Order: Passeriformes
- Family: Pachycephalidae
- Genus: Pachycephala
- Species: P. albiventris

Binomial name
- Pachycephala albiventris (Ogilvie-Grant, 1894)

Subspecies
- See text

Synonyms
- Hyloterpe albiventris; Pachycephala grisola albiventris

= Green-backed whistler =

Species of bird

The green-backed whistler (Pachycephala albiventris) or olive-backed whistler, is a species of bird in the family Pachycephalidae. It is endemic to the Philippines. Its natural habitats are tropical moist lowland forest and tropical moist montane forest.

== Description and taxonomy ==
Formerly, some authorities considered the green-backed whistler to be a subspecies of the mangrove whistler.

=== Subspecies ===
Three subspecies are recognized:

- P. a. albiventris – (Ogilvie-Grant, 1894): Found on northern Luzon (Philippines)
- P. a. crissalis – (Zimmer, JT, 1918): Originally described as a separate species. Found on central and southern Luzon (Philippines)
- P. a. mindorensis – (Bourns & Worcester, 1894): Originally described as a separate species. Found on Mindoro (Philippines)

== Ecology and behavior ==
Forages in the understory for insects and often joins mixed-species flocks Blue-headed fantail, Little pied flycatcher, Turquoise flycatcher, Negros leaf warbler and other small birds.

== Habitat and conservation status ==
Its natural habitats are tropical moist lowland forest and tropical moist montane forest up to 2,000 meters above sea level although this species seems to be more common in higher altitudes. The IUCN has classified the species as being of Least Concern where it is said to be locally common. A large portion of its montane habitat to remain intact than lowland forest. However, there it is still affected by habitat loss through deforestation, mining, land conversion and slash-and-burn.

It is found in multiple protected areas such as Mount Banahaw, Mount Makiling, Mount Isarog and Mounts Iglit–Baco Natural Park but like all areas in the Philippines protection is lax and deforestation continues despite this protection on paper.
