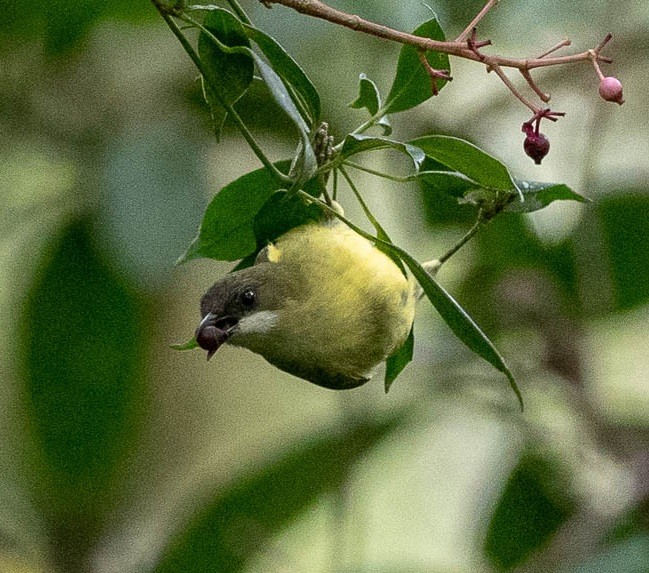

Conservation status
- Least Concern (IUCN 3.1)

Scientific classification
- Kingdom: Animalia
- Phylum: Chordata
- Class: Aves
- Order: Passeriformes
- Family: Zosteropidae
- Genus: Heleia
- Species: H. goodfellowi

Binomial name
- Heleia goodfellowi (Hartert, 1903)

= Mindanao heleia =

Species of bird

The Mindanao heleia (Heleia goodfellowi), also known as the black-masked white-eye and the Mindanao white-eye, is a species of bird in the white-eye family Zosteropidae. The specific epithet honours British zoological collector Walter Goodfellow. It is endemic to the Philippines found only on the tropical moist montane forests of Mindanao.

== Description and taxonomy ==
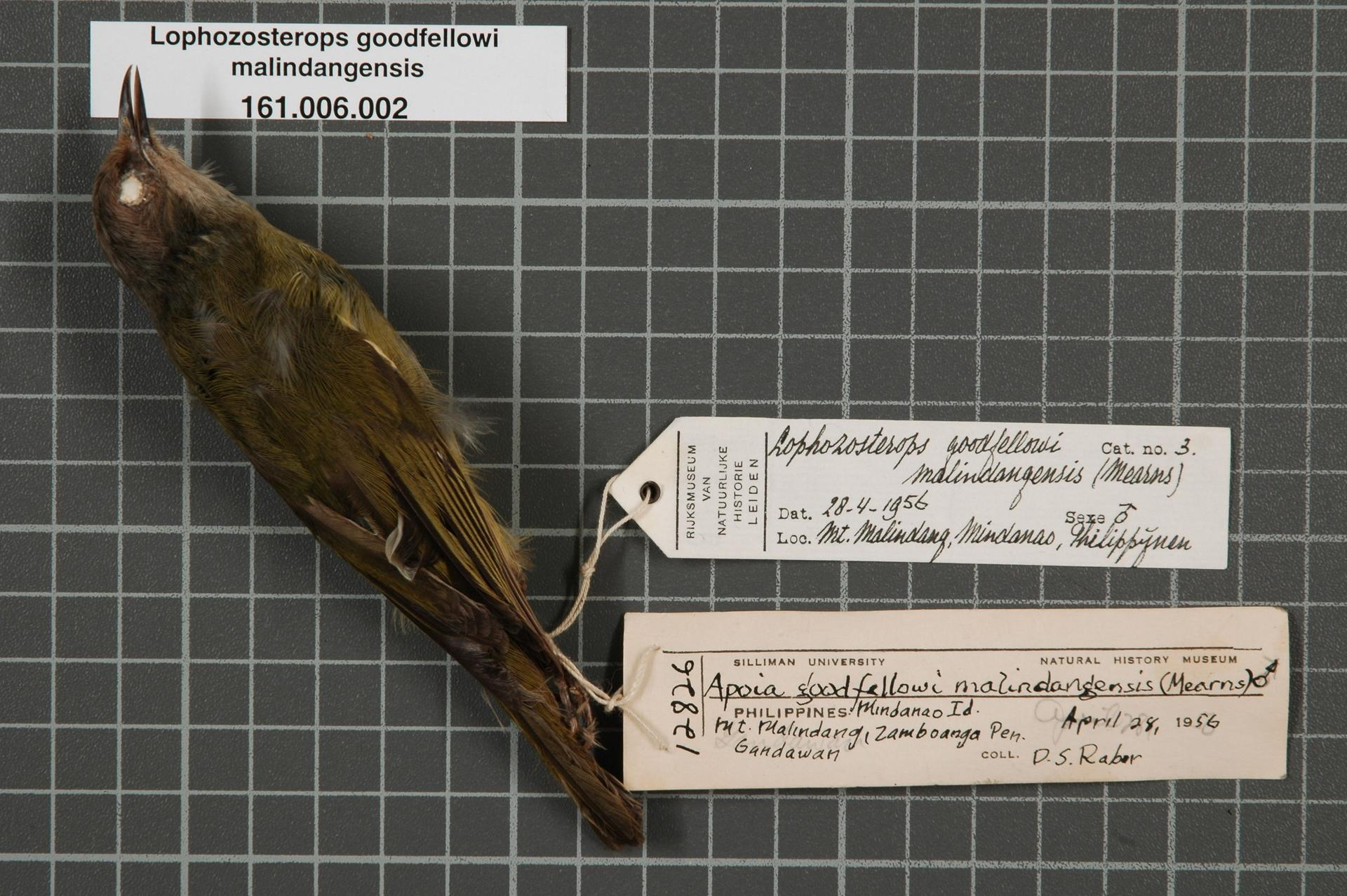
A side view of a skin from the Naturalis Biodiversity Center

=== Subspecies ===
Three subspecies are recognized:

- Heleia goodfellowi goodfellowi – Central and South Mindanao
- Heleia goodfellowi gracilis – North East Mindanao
- Heleia goodfellowi malindangensis – West Mindanao

and an undescribed subspecies in South East Mindanao

== Ecology and behavior ==
Nothing has been published about its diet but it is presumed to feed on insects, berries and nectar. It is often observed in mixed-species flocks with the Cinnamon ibon, Black-and-cinnamon fantail, Warbling white-eye and other montane Mindanao birds.

Breeding is also poorly known. Specimens collected in breeding condition with enlarged gonads in February to May. No other information has been published.

== Habitat and conservation status ==
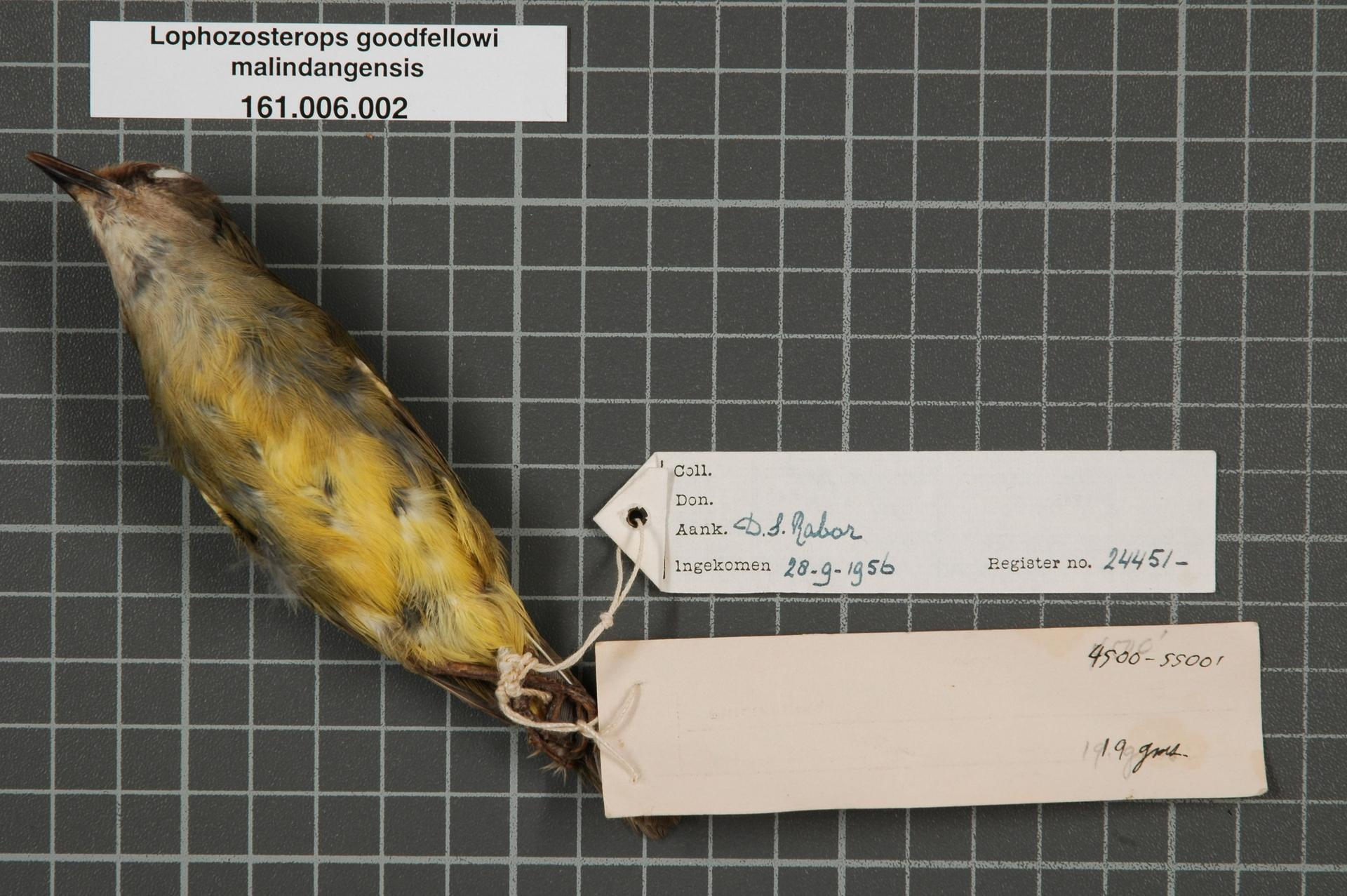
A top view of a skin from the Naturalis Biodiversity Center

It inhabits tropical moist primary and secondary sub-montane and montane forest and forest edge from 1,250 - 2,400 meters above sea level.

IUCN has assessed this bird as a least-concern species. Despite a limited range, it is said to be locally common in its range. As it occurs in rugged and inaccessible mountains, this has allowed a large portion of its habitat to remain intact. It is also able to tolerate degraded forest. However, the population is still said to be declining, as it is still affected by habitat loss through deforestation, mining, land conversion and slash-and-burn - just not to the same extent as lowland forest.
