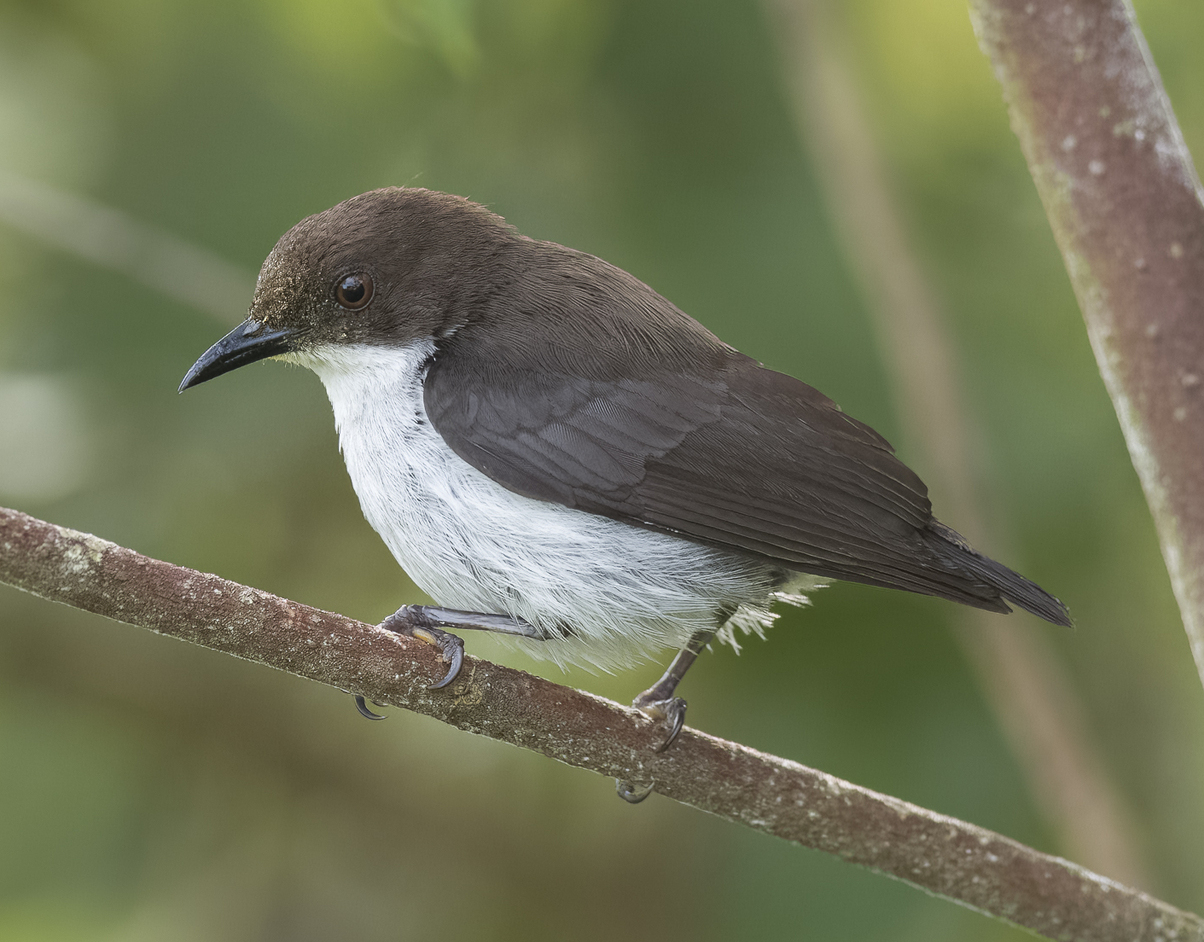
- ssp. pontifex
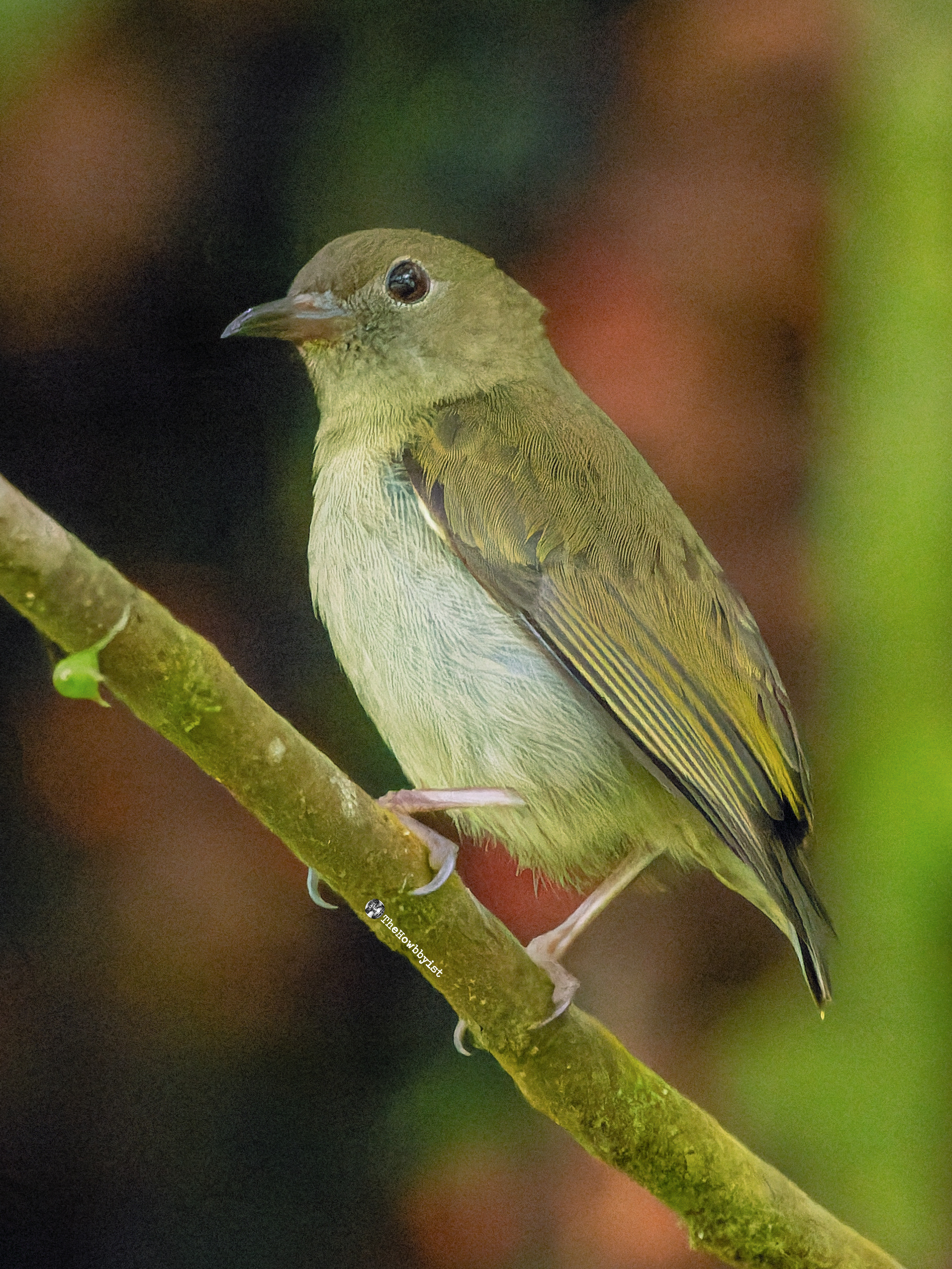
- ssp. obscurum

Conservation status
- Least Concern (IUCN 3.1)

Scientific classification
- Kingdom: Animalia
- Phylum: Chordata
- Class: Aves
- Order: Passeriformes
- Family: Dicaeidae
- Genus: Dicaeum
- Species: D. hypoleucum

Binomial name
- Dicaeum hypoleucum Sharpe, 1876

= Buzzing flowerpecker =

Species of bird

The buzzing flowerpecker (Dicaeum hypoleucum) or white-bellied flowerpecker is a species of bird in the family Dicaeidae. It is endemic to the Philippines. Its natural habitats are tropical moist lowland forest and or tropical moist montane forest.

== Taxonomy ==
The buzzing flowerpecker was formally described in 1876 by the English ornithologist Richard Bowdler Sharpe based on a specimen collected by the American ornithologist Joseph Beal Steere on the island of Basilan in the Philippines. Sharpe placed the new species in the genus Dicaeum and coined the current binomial name Dicaeum hypoleucum where the specific epithet combined the Ancient Greek ὑπο/hupo meaning "beneath" with λευκος/leukos meaning "white".

Five subspecies are recognised:

- D. h. cagayanense Rand, AL & Rabor, DS, 1967 – northern Philippines (Sierra Madre mountains of northeastern Luzon)
- D. h. obscurum Ogilvie-Grant, WR, 1894 – northern Philippines (central and southern Luzon and Catanduanes)
- D. h. pontifex Mayr, E, 1946 – Philippines (Bohol, Samar, Leyte, Dinagat Islands, Panaon, and Mindanao)
- D. h. mindanense Tweeddale, A, 1877 – southern Philippines (Zamboanga Peninsula of Mindanao)
- D. h. hypoleucum Sharpe, RB, 1876 – Basilan and Sulu Archipelago (Bongao, Jolo, Tawitawi, and Siasi; southern Philippines)

== Ecology and behavior ==
Not much is known about its diet but it is presumed to have the typical flowerpecker diet of small fruits, insects, nectar especially from mistletoes. Typically seen singly, pairs and small groups but joins mixed species flocks.

== Habitat and conservation status ==
Its natural habitats are tropical moist lowland forest, montane forest and second growth up to 1,800 meters above sea level.

The IUCN has classified the species as being of Least Concern as it has a large range and it is common throughout. However, the population is declining due to deforestation in the Philippines throughout the country due to slash and burn farming, mining, illegal logging and habitat conversion.

It is found in multiple protected areas such as Pasonanca Natural Park, Mount Banahaw, Mount Kitanglad. Mount Apo, Mount Pulag and Northern Sierra Madre Natural Park but like all areas in the Philippines, protection is lax and deforestation continues despite this protection on paper.
