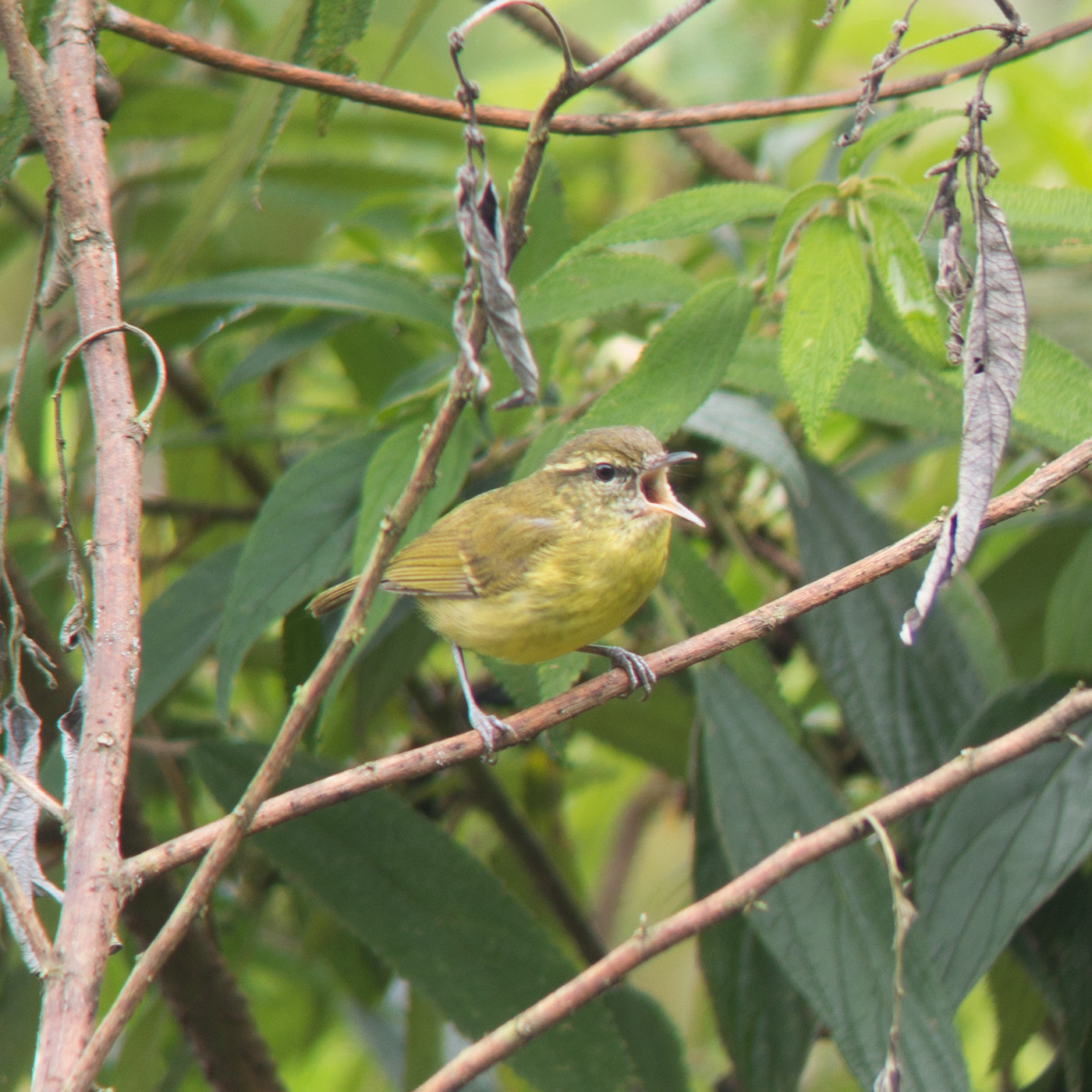

Scientific classification
- Kingdom: Animalia
- Phylum: Chordata
- Class: Aves
- Order: Passeriformes
- Family: Phylloscopidae
- Genus: Phylloscopus
- Species: P. nigrorum

Binomial name
- Phylloscopus nigrorum (Moseley, 1891)

= Negros leaf warbler =

Species of bird

The Negros leaf warbler (Phylloscopus nigrorum) is a songbird species from the leaf warbler family (Phylloscopidae). It was formerly included in the "Old World warbler" assemblage.

It is found in the Philippines. Its natural habitats are tropical moist montane forest above 800 meters above sea level.

== Description and taxonomy ==
=== Subspecies ===
Seven subspecies are recognized:

- P. n. nigrorum – Found on southern Luzon, Mindoro, Panay and Negros
- P. n. diuatae – Found on Camiguin Sur and northeastern Mindanao
- P. n. mindanensis – Found on Southern Mindanao
- P. n. malindangensis – 1957: Found on Zamboanga Peninsula and Mount Malindang
- P. n. flavostriatus – Found in Mount Katanglad and mountains of Misamis Oriental Province
- P. n. peterseni –: Found in Palawan
- P. n. benguetensis – Found in North Luzon

== Ecology and behavior ==
Forages in the understory for insects and often joins mixed-species flocks that include Blue-headed fantail, Golden-crowned babbler, Lemon-throated leaf warbler, Black-crowned babbler Little pied flycatcher, Turquoise flycatcher and other small birds. Breeding in February to August. Nest is a dome -shaped ball and lays 2 to 3 eggs.

== Habitat and conservation status ==
This species habitat is primary and secondary montane forest above 800 meters above sea level

The IUCN does not yet recognize this as a full species but this species is not believed be threatened as it has a large range. However, deforestation in the Philippines continues throughout the country due to slash and burn farming, mining, illegal logging and habitat conversion.
