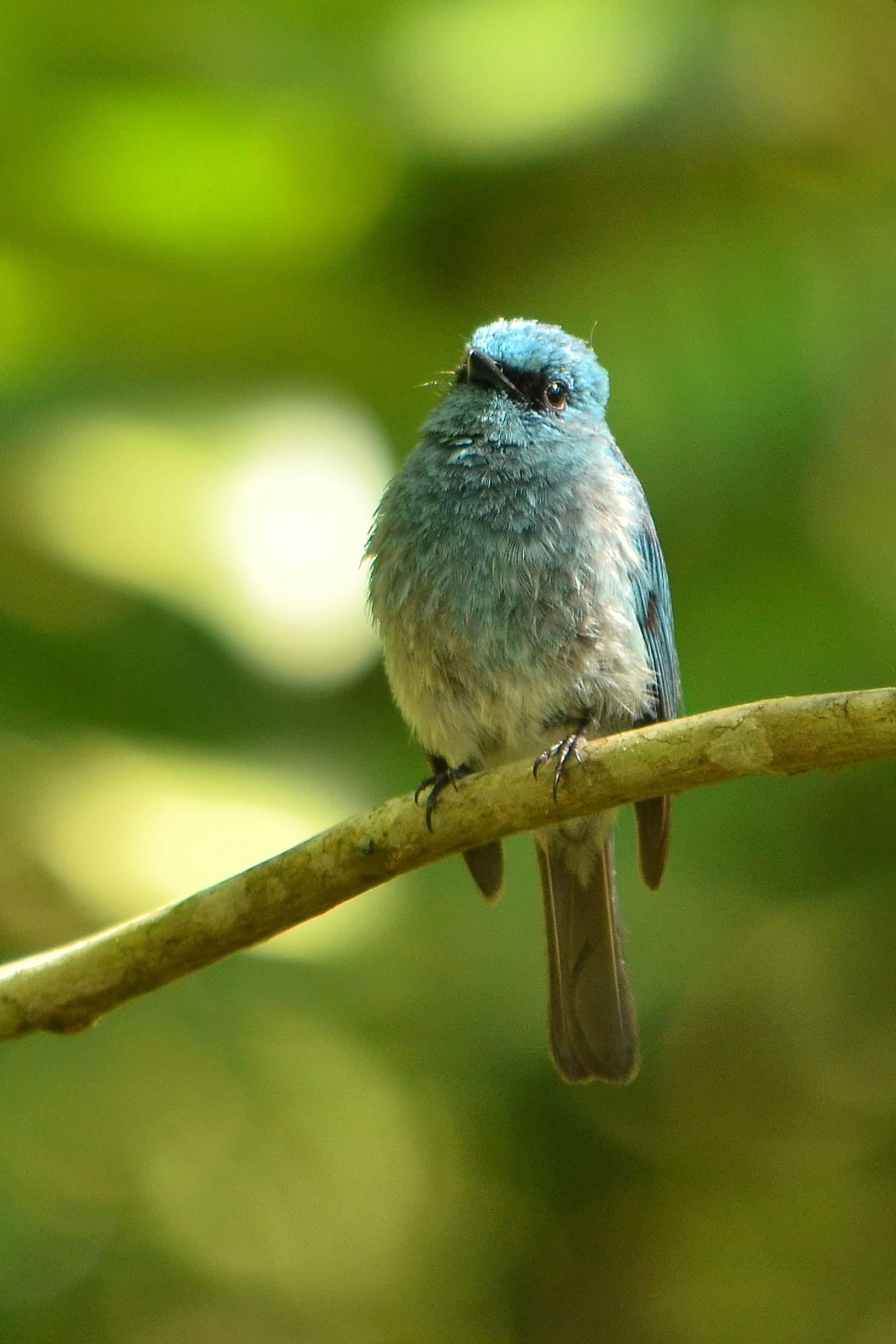
- A male of E. panayensis septentrionalis in North Sulawesi, Indonesia

Conservation status
- Least Concern (IUCN 3.1)

Scientific classification
- Kingdom: Animalia
- Phylum: Chordata
- Class: Aves
- Order: Passeriformes
- Family: Muscicapidae
- Genus: Eumyias
- Species: E. panayensis

Binomial name
- Eumyias panayensis Sharpe, 1877

Synonyms
- Stoporola panayensis

= Turquoise flycatcher =

Species of bird

The turquoise flycatcher (Eumyias panayensis), also known as the island flycatcher, is a species of bird in the family Muscicapidae. It is found in Indonesia (Sulawesi, Maluku, Ambon) and the Philippines. Its natural habitat is subtropical or tropical moist montane forests.
