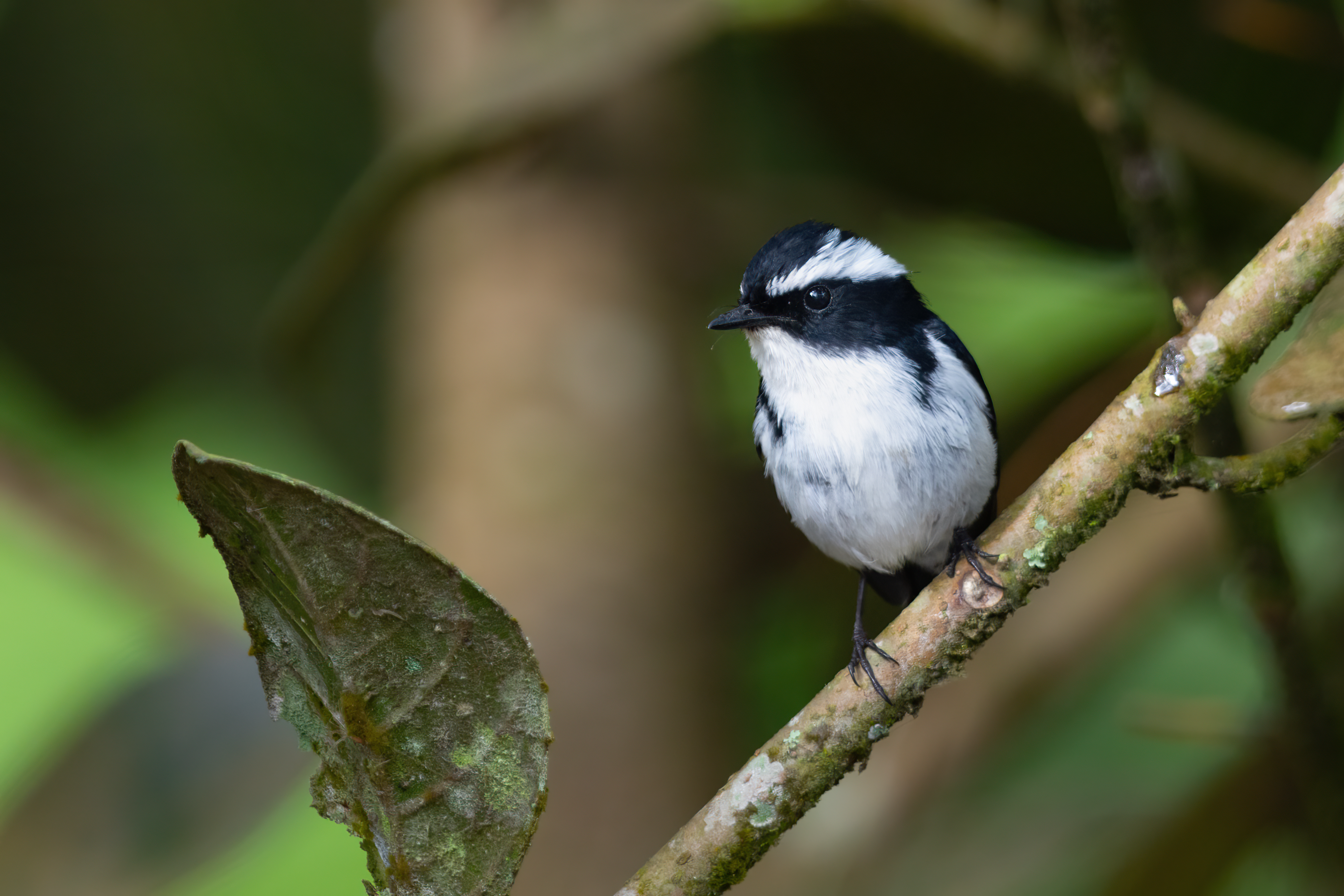
- Male from East Java, Indonesia

Conservation status
- Least Concern (IUCN 3.1)

Scientific classification
- Kingdom: Animalia
- Phylum: Chordata
- Class: Aves
- Order: Passeriformes
- Family: Muscicapidae
- Genus: Ficedula
- Species: F. westermanni

Binomial name
- Ficedula westermanni (Sharpe, 1888)

Synonyms
- Muscicapula westermanni

= Little pied flycatcher =

Species of bird

The little pied flycatcher (Ficedula westermanni) is a species of bird in the family Muscicapidae. It is native to the Himalayas and Southeast Asia.

The species was given the binomial Muscicapula westermanni by R.B. Sharpe in 1888 based on a specimen collected by Leonard Ray in Malaysia and named after Gerardus Frederik Westerman.

Its natural habitats are subtropical or tropical moist lowland forest and subtropical or tropical moist montane forest.

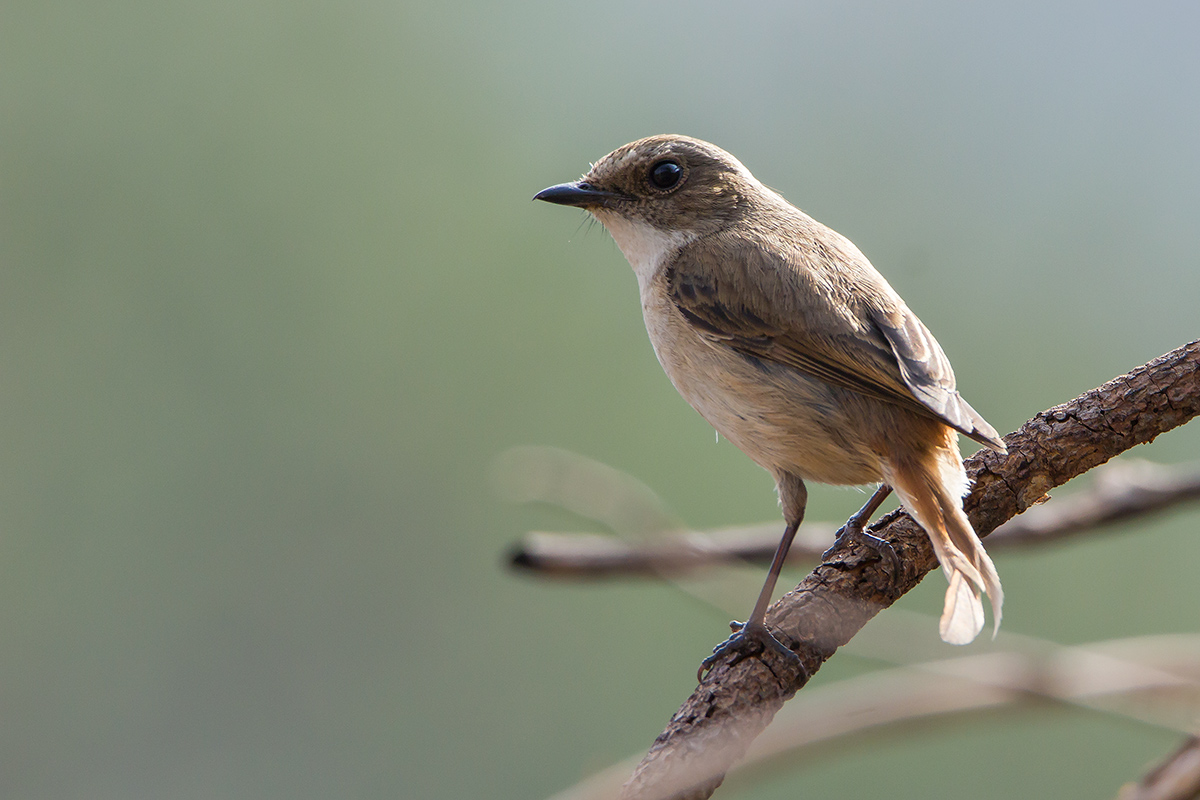
Female from Sattal India

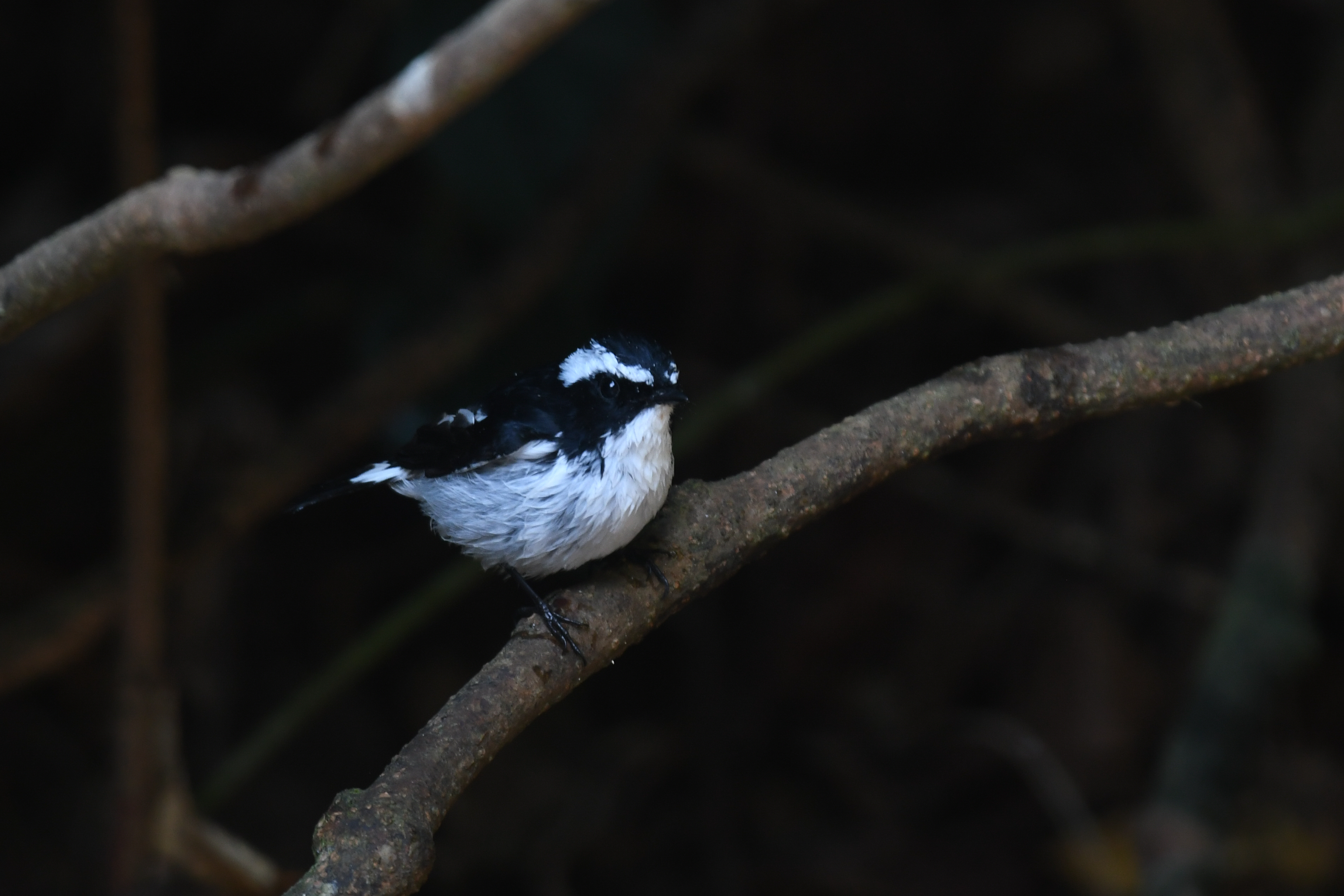
Dulung Hide, Dulung Reserve Forest, Lakhimpur, Assam

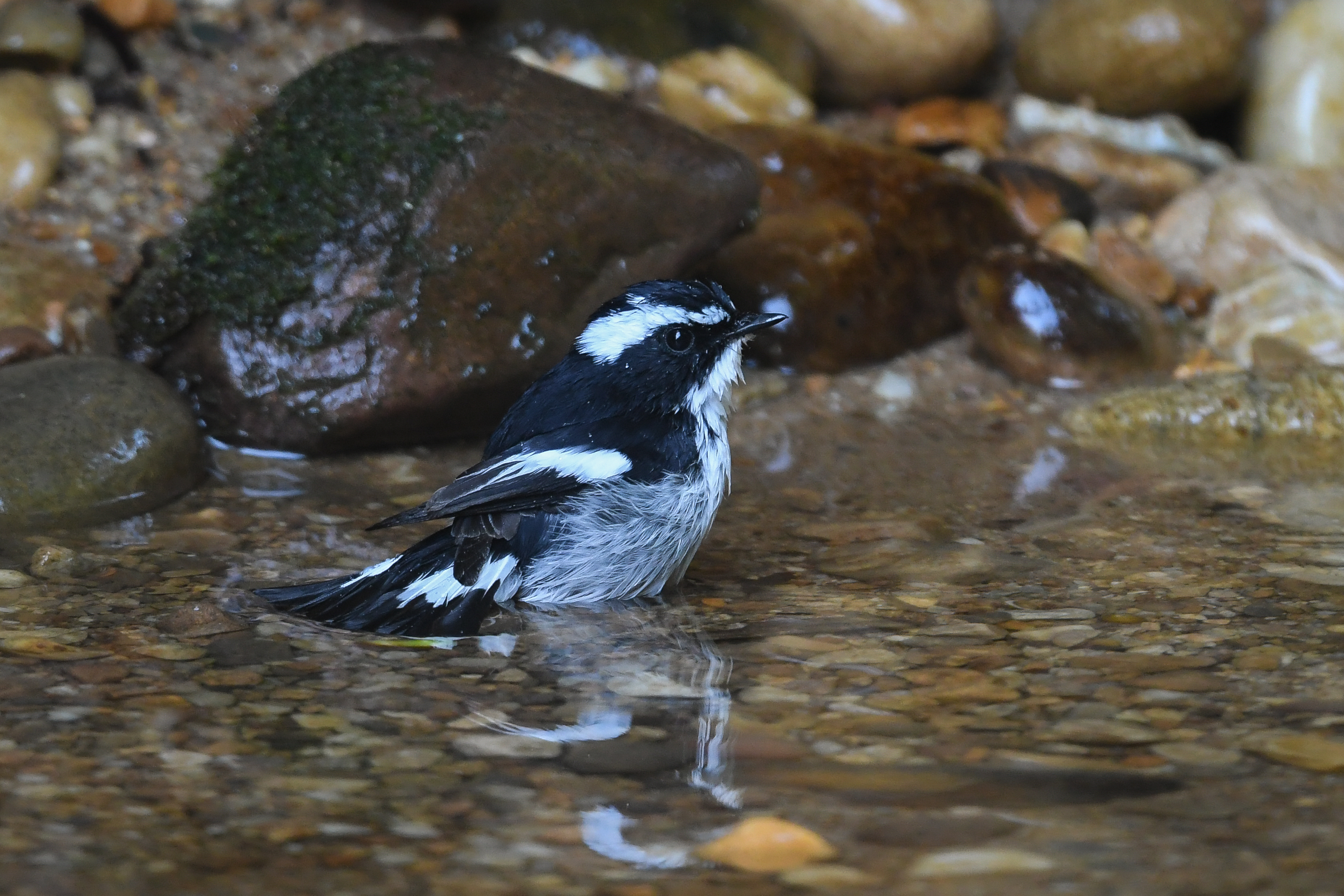
Dulung Hide, Dulung Reserve Forest, Lakhimpur, Assam
