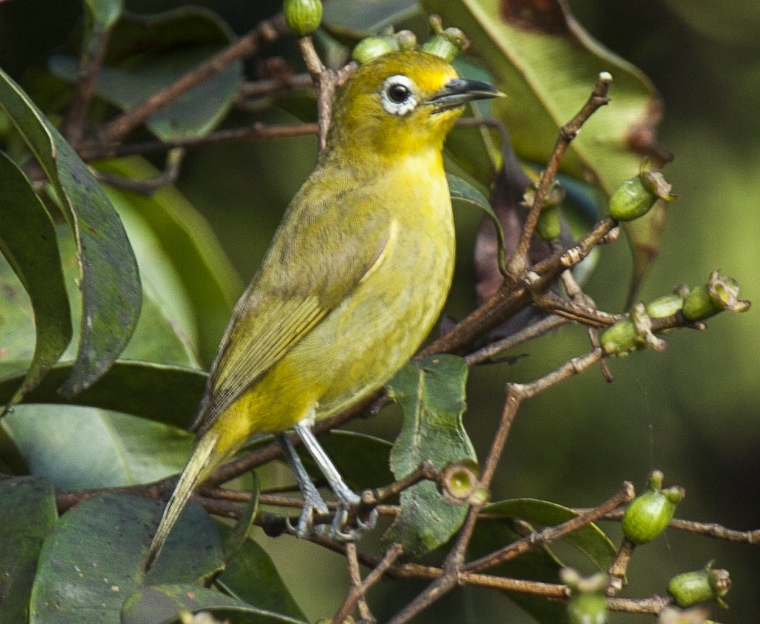

Conservation status
- Least Concern (IUCN 3.1)

Scientific classification
- Kingdom: Animalia
- Phylum: Chordata
- Class: Aves
- Order: Passeriformes
- Family: Zosteropidae
- Genus: Zosterops
- Species: Z. nigrorum

Binomial name
- Zosterops nigrorum Tweeddale, 1878

= Yellowish white-eye =

Species of bird

The yellowish white-eye (Zosterops nigrorum) or golden-yellow white-eye, is a species of bird in the family Zosteropidae. It is endemic to the Philippines. Its natural habitat is tropical moist lowland forests.

== Description and taxonomy ==
=== Subspecies ===
Eight subspecies are recognised:

- Z. n. richmondi McGregor, RC, 1904 – Cagayancillo Islands (southeast of Palawan, southwestern Philippines)
- Z. n. meyleri McGregor, RC, 1907 – northern Philippines (Camiguin Norte)
- Z. n. aureiloris Ogilvie-Grant, WR, 1895 – northern Philippines (northwestern Luzon)
- Z. n. innominatus Finsch, FHO, 1901 – northern Philippines (northeastern and central Luzon)
- Z. n. luzonicus Ogilvie-Grant, WR, 1895 – northern Philippines (southeastern Luzon and Catanduanes)
- Z. n. catarmanensis Rand, AL & Rabor, DS, 1969 – southern Philippines (Camiguin Sur)
- Z. n. nigrorum Tweeddale, A, 1878 – Philippines (Masbate, Negros, Ticao, Panay and Caluya)
- Z. n. mindorensis Parkes, KC, 1971 – Philippines (Mindoro)

== Ecology and behavior ==
Forages in the understory for insects and often joins mixed-species flocks that include Blue-headed fantail, Golden-crowned babbler, Lemon-throated leaf warbler, Black-crowned babbler, Flame-templed babbler and other small birds. Adults with enlarged gonads from January to May but not much else is known.

== Habitat and conservation status ==
Its natural habitats are tropical moist lowland forest, second growth and plantations up to 1,250 meters above sea level.

The IUCN has classified the species as being of Least Concern as it has a large range and it is common throughout. However, deforestation in the Philippines continues throughout the country due to slash and burn farming, mining, illegal logging and habitat conversion.
