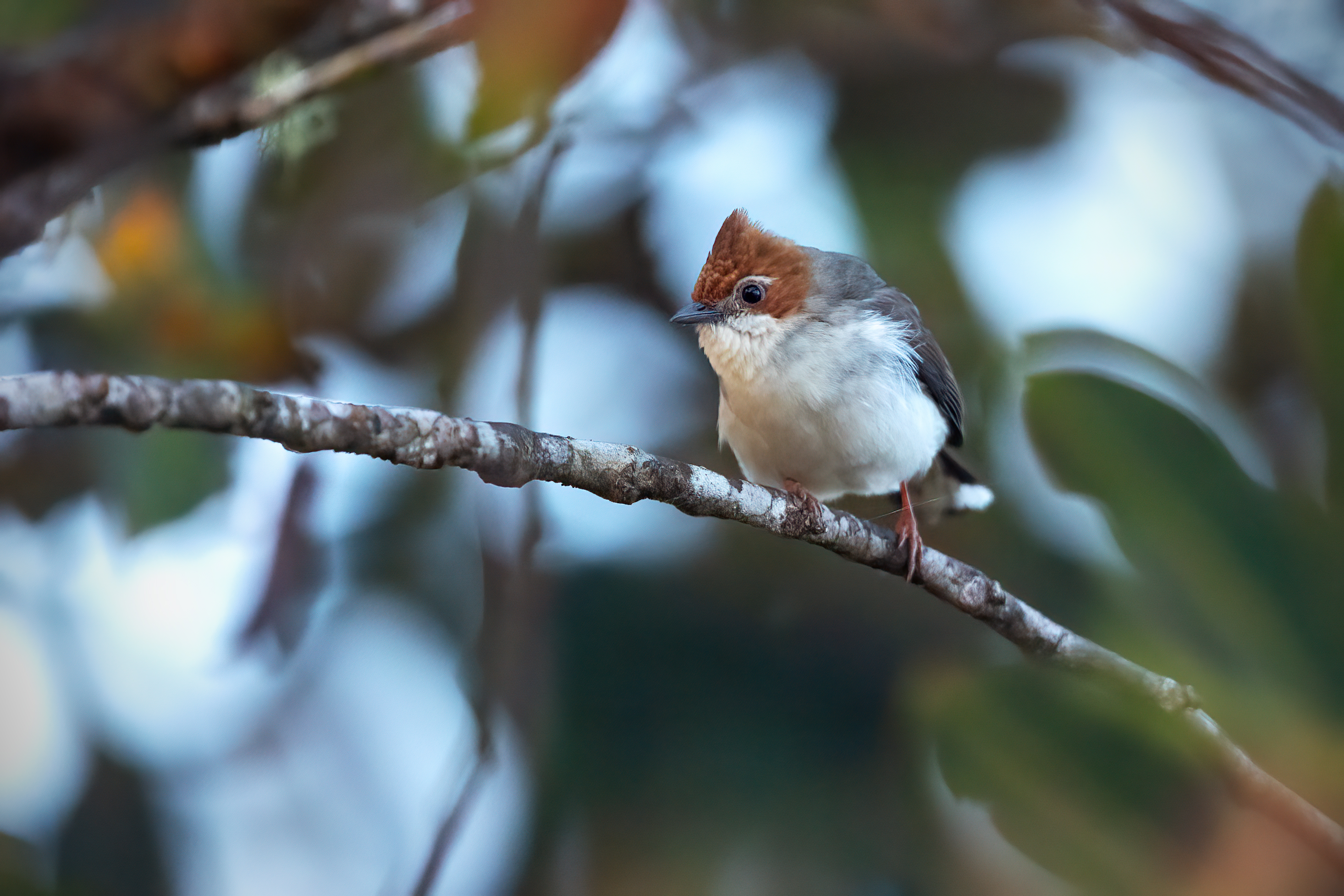

Conservation status
- Least Concern (IUCN 3.1)

Scientific classification
- Kingdom: Animalia
- Phylum: Chordata
- Class: Aves
- Order: Passeriformes
- Family: Zosteropidae
- Genus: Staphida
- Species: S. everetti

Binomial name
- Staphida everetti Sharpe, 1887

Synonyms
- Staphida everetti

= Chestnut-crested yuhina =

Species of bird

The chestnut-crested yuhina (Staphida everetti) is a species of bird in the white-eye family Zosteropidae. The species has been included in the genus Staphida, along with the Indochinese yuhina and the striated yuhina of mainland Asia, and all three have been considered a single species. The scientific name commemorates British colonial administrator and zoological collector Alfred Hart Everett.

== Distribution and habitat ==
It is found in Brunei, Indonesia, and Malaysia where it is endemic to the island of Borneo. Its natural habitat is broadleaf evergreen submontane and montane forests, forest edge and secondary growth from 100–2,800 m (330–9,190 ft). They are common and are often one of the most common species in their range.
