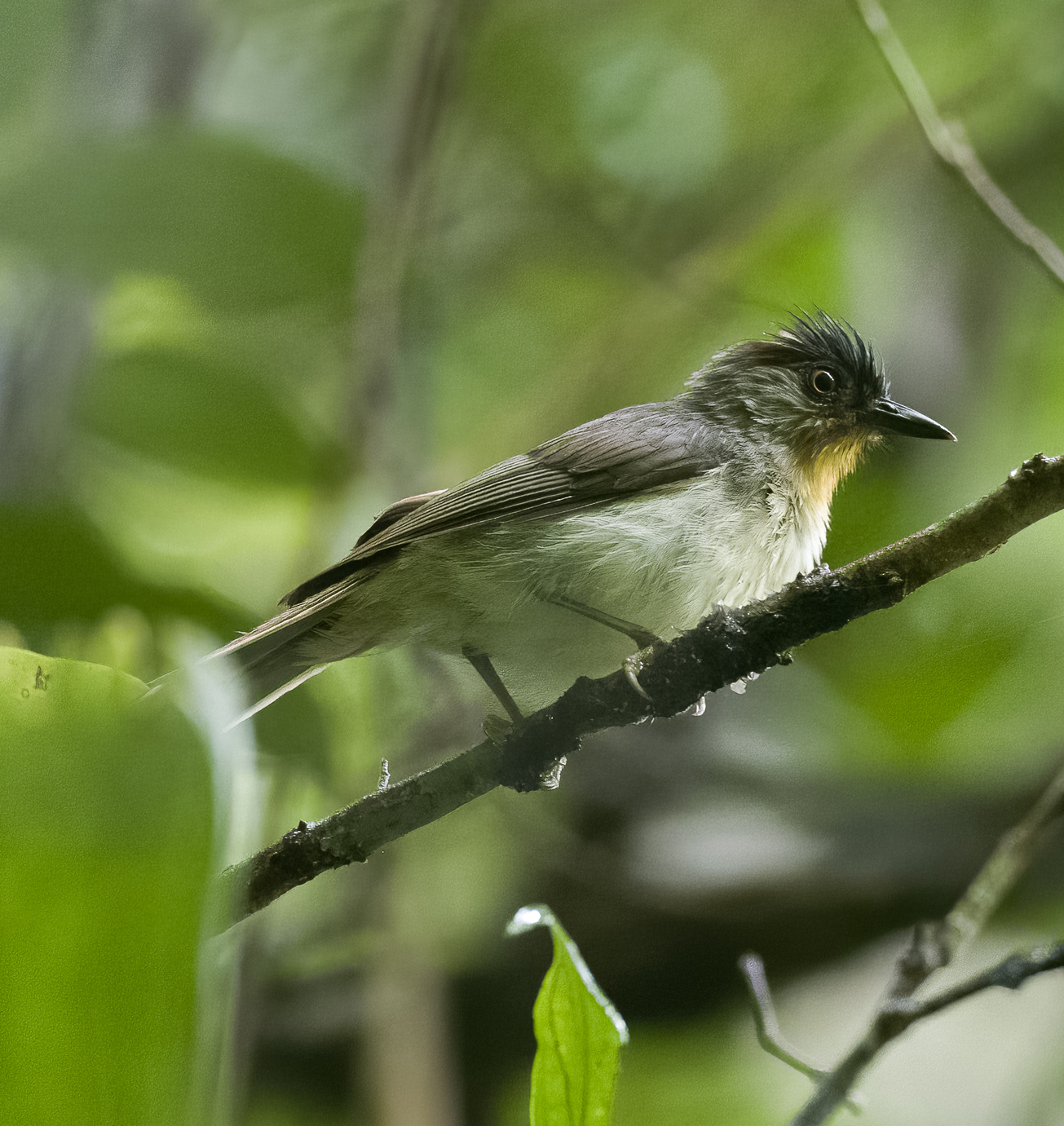

Conservation status
- Least Concern (IUCN 3.1)

Scientific classification
- Kingdom: Animalia
- Phylum: Chordata
- Class: Aves
- Order: Passeriformes
- Family: Zosteropidae
- Genus: Sterrhoptilus
- Species: S. nigrocapitatus

Binomial name
- Sterrhoptilus nigrocapitatus (Steere, 1890)

Synonyms
- Sterrhoptilus nigrocapitata

= Visayan babbler =

Species of bird

The Visayan babbler (Sterrhoptilus nigrocapitatus), also known as the Visayan black-crowned babbler, is a species of bird in the family Zosteropidae. It is endemic to the Philippines. It is found on Samar, Leyte and Bohol. Its natural habitat is tropical moist lowland forest. It was formerly conspecific to the northern population of the Calabarzon black-crowned babbler but has since been split as a species due to differences in its yellowish throat and whiter belly.

== Description and taxonomy ==
This species is a small bird found in the lowland forests of Samar, Leyte and Bohol. It has a grayish back and cheek with faint streakings and has white outer tail feathers and underparts. It has a throat with a pale orange wash and a sooty black cap. Contrary to its name, this species is closer related to White-eyes and are in the same family as them.

Its call is described as a medium pitched call with two notes with the second note downslurred. Voice includes a medium-pitched "poo piuu!" with the second note downslurred.

=== Subspecies ===
Two subspecies are recognized:

- S.n. nigrocapitatus- Found on Samar and Leyte
- S.n. boholensis - Found on Bohol

It was formerly conspecific with the Calabarzon babbler but is differentiated by it is differentiated from its northern counterpart by having a less orange chin and whiter belly. Its validity as a species were also further validated by sequencing its mitochondrial DNA. Although its appearance is closest to this species, it is closer related to the Rusty-crowned babbler. Meanwhile, the Calabarzon babbler is most closely related to the Golden-crowned babbler .These two species are known to interbreed in areas where their range overlaps.

== Ecology and behavior ==
Diet is assumed to primarily be insects, berries and vegetable matter. They are spotted foraging alone, in pairs or in mixed flocks with other species. It is often observed in mixed-species flocks that include the yellow-bellied whistler, Visayan fantail, Philippine jungle flycatcher, short-tailed drongo, black-naped monarch, celestial monarch, rufous paradise flycatcher, Philippine leaf warbler, yellow-wattled bulbul, tailorbirds and sunbirds.

Breeding season is believed to from April to July, which is the general breeding season for most Philippine forest birds. One nest was found that was cup shaped made out of moss and woven together with roots with small twigs just one meter above the ground. This nest contained 3 eggs but this single nest is not enough to assume average clutch.

== Habitat and conservation status ==
Its natural habitats are tropical moist lowland forest, tropical mangrove forest, and tropical moist shrubland with most records under 1,150 meters above sea level. It is often found foraging in the understorey and lower parts of the canopy.

IUCN has yet to assess the Visayan babbler as it only recognizes the black-crowned babbler which it has assessed as least-concern with the population believed to be decreasing. It is believed that among the two, the Visayan babbler has gone a more dreastic decline. Extensive lowland deforestation on all islands in its range is the main threat. Most remaining lowland forest that is not afforded protection leaving it vulnerable to both legal and Illegal logging, conversion into farmlands through slash-and-burn and mining. There is only 4% forest remaining in Bohol and around 400 km^{2} of primary forest combined in Samar and Leyte with no respite in deforestation.

This occurs in a few protected areas such as Rajah Sikatuna Protected Landscape and Samar Island Natural Park however protection is lax.
