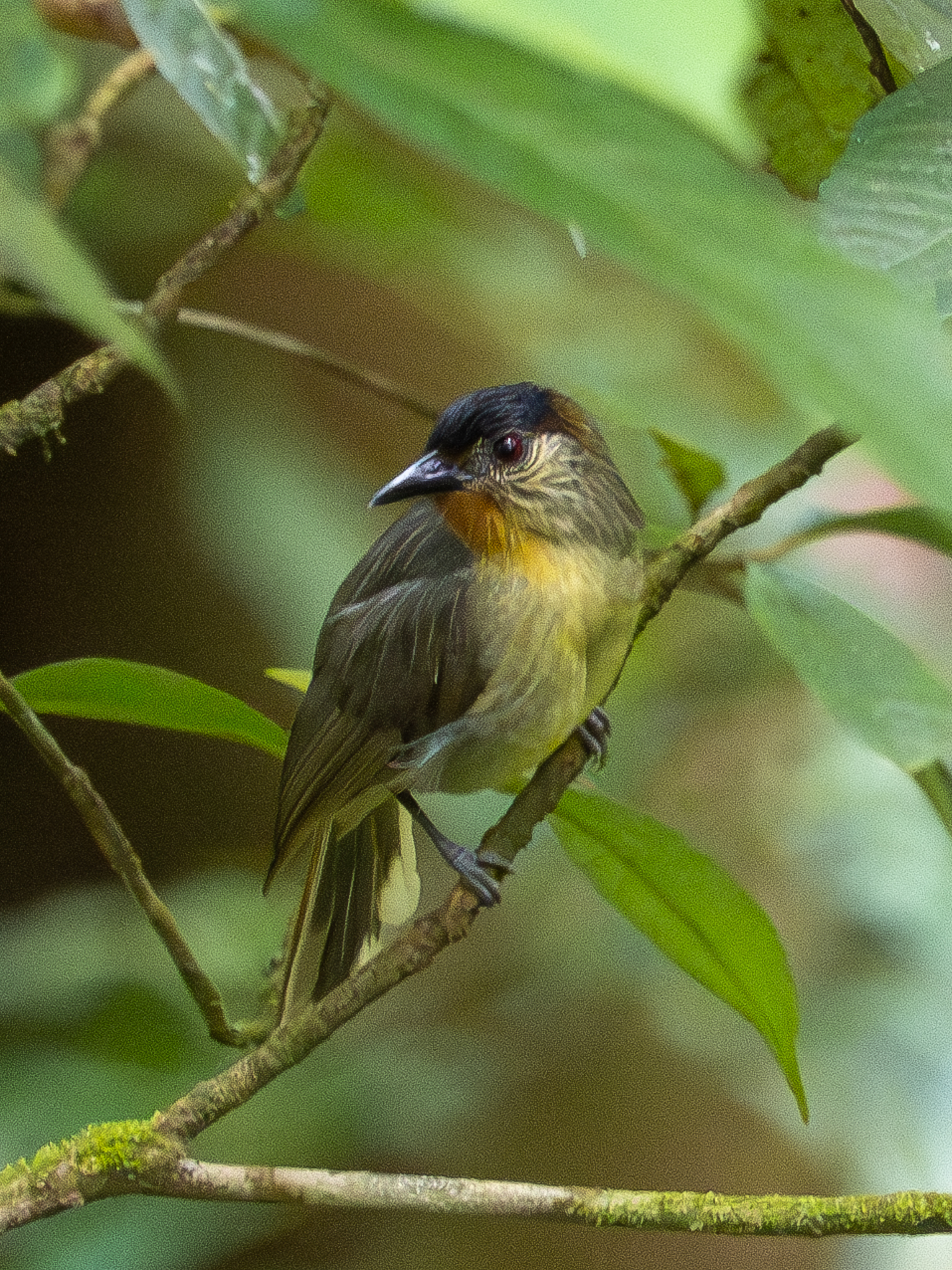

Conservation status
- Least Concern (IUCN 3.1)

Scientific classification
- Kingdom: Animalia
- Phylum: Chordata
- Class: Aves
- Order: Passeriformes
- Family: Zosteropidae
- Genus: Sterrhoptilus
- Species: S. affinis

Binomial name
- Sterrhoptilus affinis (McGregor, RC 1907)

= Calabarzon babbler =

Species of bird found in the Philippines

The Calabarzon babbler (Sterrhoptilus affinis) is a species of bird in the family Zosteropidae. It is endemic to the Philippines found in the island of Luzon. Contrary to its name, it is also found outside the Calabarzon region where it also inhabits Central Luzon, Bicol Peninsula and Catanduanes. Its natural habitat is tropical moist lowland forest. It previously was considered a subspecies of the black-crowned babbler (Sterrhoptilus nigrocapitatus).

== Description and taxonomy ==
This is a small bird found in lowland and foothill forest in Luzon. It has a grayish back and cheek with faint streakings and has white outer tail feathers and underparts. It has a throat with an orange was and a sooty black cap. Contrary to its name, this species is closer related to White-eyes and are in the same family as them.

This species was formally described in 1907 by the Australian-American ornithologist Richard Crittenden McGregor as Zosterornis affinis based on a specimen collected in Lamao, Bataan on the island of Luzon in the Philippines. The specific epithet is Latin meaning "related", "allied" or "neighbourly".

This species is monotypic.

It was formerly conspecific with the Visayan babbler but is differentiated by it is differentiated from its southern counterpart by having a more intense orange chin and olive-toned upper parts. Its validity as a species were also further validated by sequencing its mitochondrial DNA. Although its appearance is closest to this species, it is closer related to the Golden-crowned babbler These two species are known to interbreed in areas where their range overlaps. Meanwhile, the Visayan babbler is most closely related to the Rusty-crowned babbler.

== Ecology and behavior ==
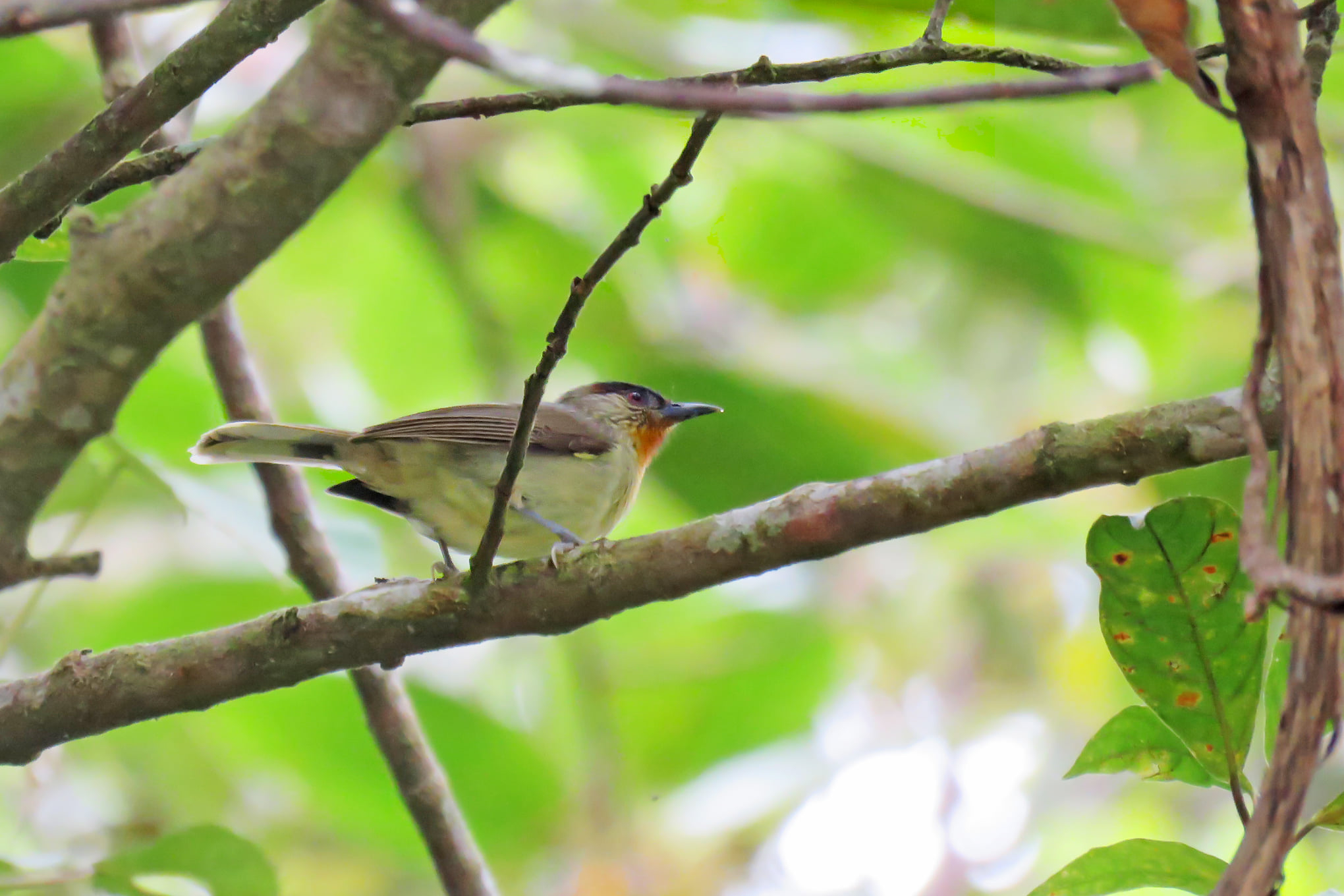
In Quezon

Diet is assumed to primarily be insects, berries and vegetable matter. They are spotted foraging alone, in pairs or in mixed flocks with other species like the blue-headed fantail, rufous paradise flycatcher, lemon-throated leaf warbler, yellow-wattled bulbul, white-eyes, sunbirds and flowerpeckers. Forages in all levels but is usually seen in the understorey where it methodically gleans on leaves searching for insects.

Breeding season is believed to from April to July, which is the general breeding season for most Philippine forest birds. One nest was found that was cup shaped made out of moss and woven together with roots with small twigs just one meter above the ground. This nest contained 3 eggs but this single nest is not enough to assume average clutch.

== Habitat and conservation status ==
It is found in lowland and foothill forest, second growth and forest edge until 1,140 meters above sea level.

The International Union for Conservation of Nature still recognizes the black-crowned babbler as a single species which is assessed as least concern. This species is believed to be on the decline. This species' main threat is habitat loss with wholesale clearance of forest habitats as a result of logging, agricultural conversion and mining activities occurring within the range.

There are currently no targeted conservation plans for the species. It does occur in the protected areas in Quezon Protected Landscape, Bicol Natural Park, Bulusan Volcano Natural Park and the Angat Watershed Forest Reserve but enforcement from loggers and hunters is still lax.
