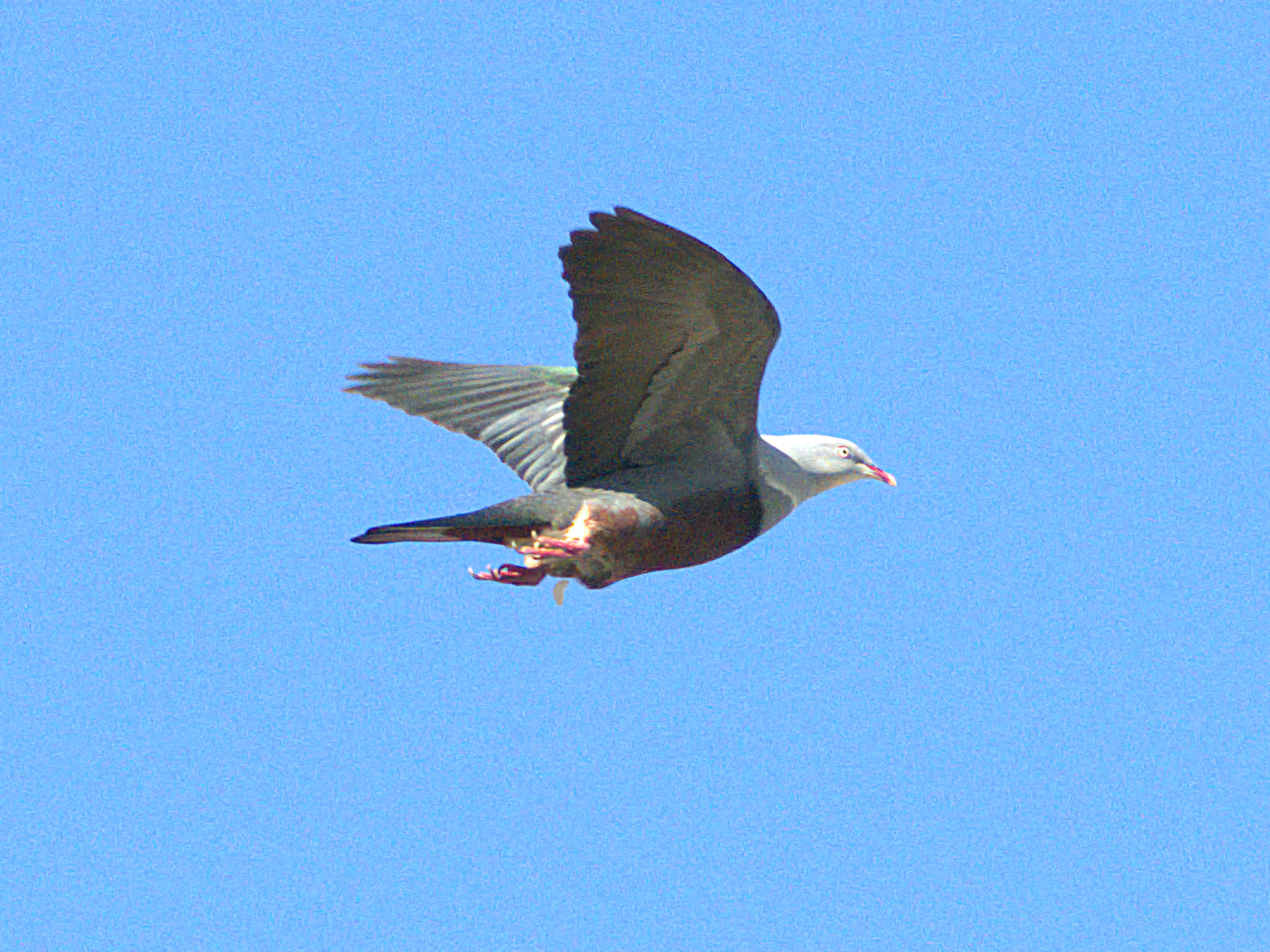
- Male ssp. carola
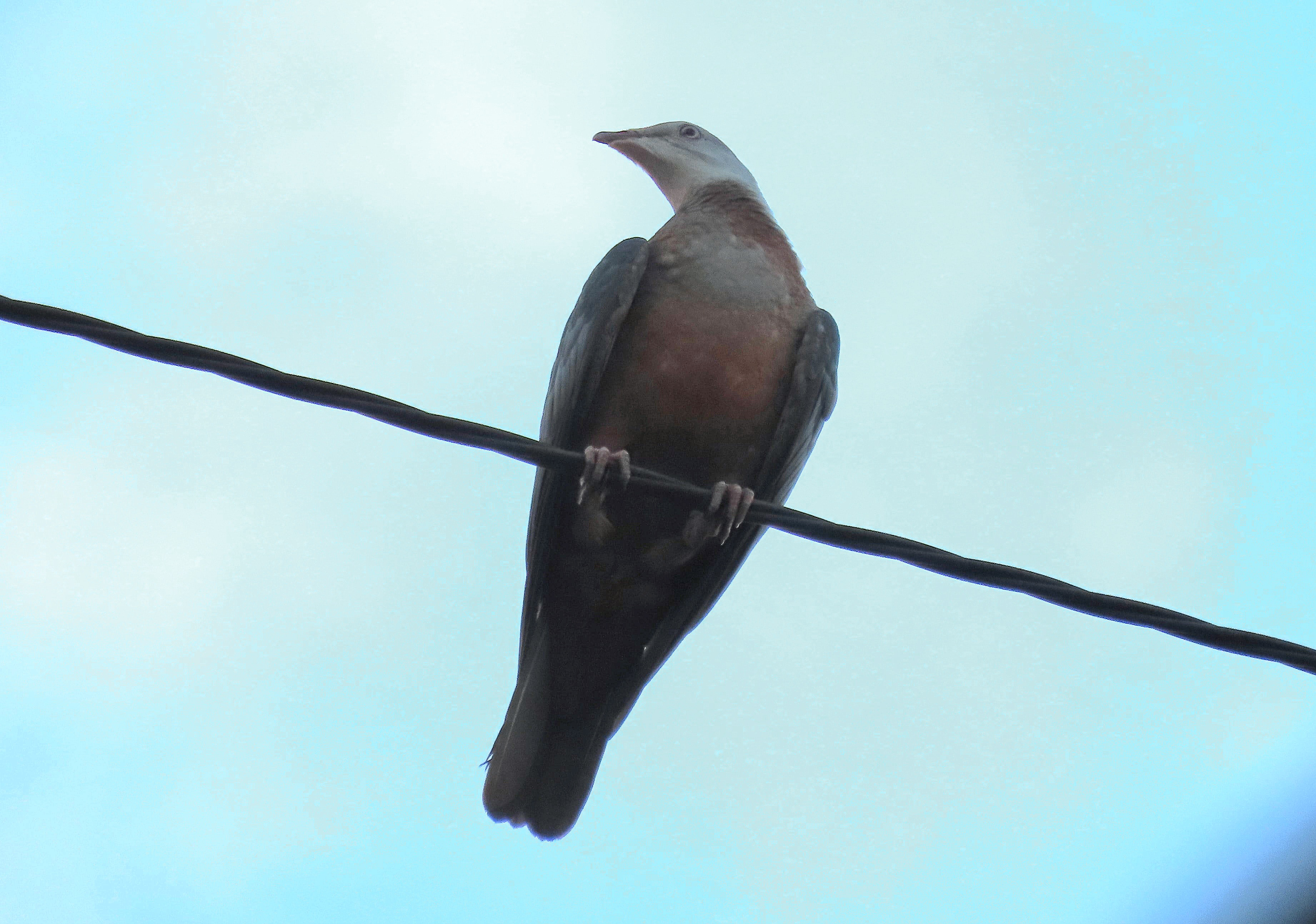
- Female ssp. carola

Conservation status
- Vulnerable (IUCN 3.1)

Scientific classification
- Kingdom: Animalia
- Phylum: Chordata
- Class: Aves
- Order: Columbiformes
- Family: Columbidae
- Genus: Ducula
- Species: D. carola

Binomial name
- Ducula carola (Bonaparte, 1854)

= Spotted imperial pigeon =

Species of bird

The spotted imperial pigeon (Ducula carola), also known as the grey-necked imperial pigeon, is a species of bird in the family Columbidae. This species is endemic to the Philippines. Its natural habitat is tropical moist lowland forests and tropical moist montane forest but seasonally migrates to limestone shorelines in large flocks of up to 50 individuals, for still unknown and not-well studied reasons but the prevailing theories is that it feeds on the calcium deposits.. Among the imperial pigeons of the Philippines, this species is the most threatened - assessed as a Vulnerable species with population estimates of 1,200 to 3,200 mature individuals and still believed to be on the decline due to habitat loss, hunting and capture for the illegal wildlife trade.

It is illegal to hunt, capture or possess spotted imperial pigeons under Philippine Law RA 9147.

== Description and taxonomy ==
This species was first described as Ptilocolpa carola by Charles Lucien Bonaparte in 1854. The specific name carola is derived from the name of a daughter of Bonaparte, Charlotte Honorine Joséphine Pauline Contessa Primoli di Foglia. Overall length is 32–38 cm (13–15 in)

In the male of the nominate subspecies carola, the head and neck are ashy grey. The back and wings are grey, with black spots, some parts having a green gloss. The underside of the wings is pale grey. The tail is blackish with a greenish gloss. The throat is creamy white, the breast is dark grey with a white crescent, and the abdomen is dark chestnut. The feet are purple or pinkish red. The beak is reddish, and the iris is whitish. The female has browner upperparts and does not have a white crescent on its breast. The juvenile bird is similar to the female, but is duller. The other two subspecies can be distinguished by the patterns on their breasts and the colours of their upperparts.

=== Subspecies ===
Three subspecies are recognized

- D. c. carola on Luzon, Mindoro and Sibuyan; Grey breast and slaty gray wings
- D. c. nigrorum on Negros and Siquijor (and possibly on Panay); Black breast and light chestnut brown wings; Possibly extinct
- D. c. mindanensis on Mindanao; Black breast and reddish chestnut wings

The subspecies mindanensis and nigrorum may possibly be split into a new species called the Black-breasted imperial pigeon.

== Distribution and habitat ==
The spotted imperial pigeon is endemic to the Philippines. It has been recorded on Luzon, Mindoro, Sibuyan, Negros, Siquijor and Mindanao, but may be locally extinct on some islands. Its habitats are forests and forest edges, including areas with some logging. It is usually found below elevations of 2,000 m (6,600 ft) above sea level. Seasonally visits limestone shorelines for reasons that have yet to be fully studied.

== Behaviour and ecology ==
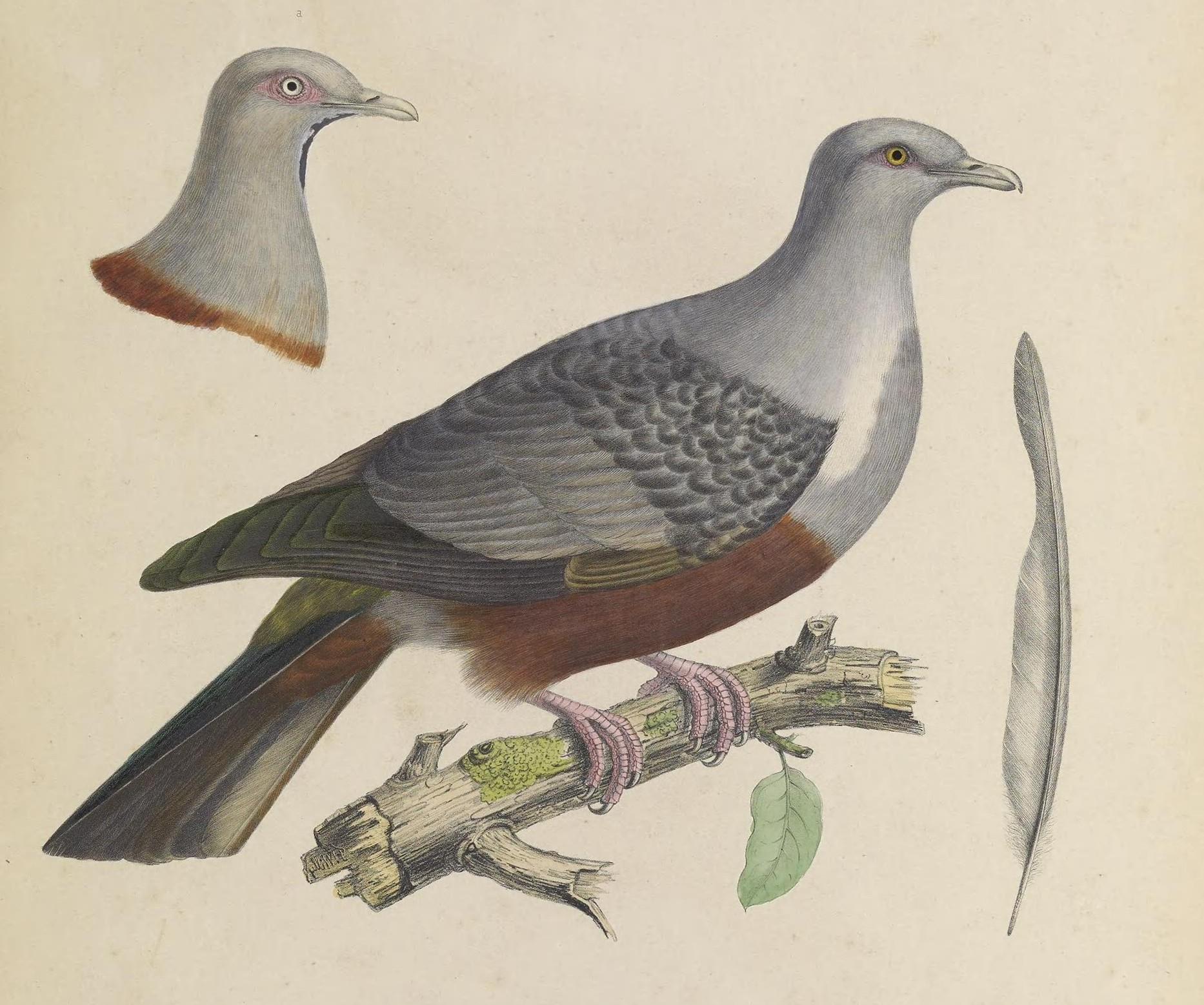
In illustration of a male Spotted Imperial Pigeon (carola sub-species)

This pigeon is often found in flocks of more than 30 individuals. It associates with the green imperial pigeon. The spotted imperial pigeon's voices include po po po po po, and a hu hu hu hu hu call. Captive birds give low oomph notes. It eats fruits from Eugenia and Ficus trees. It probably breeds from February to July. One nest has been recorded in a hollow in a cliff. Flocks react to the availability of food by moving great distances daily and seasonally. Seasonally visits limestone shorelines for reasons that have yet to be fully studied. Richard Ruiz, who has been monitoring the annual return of the pigeons to Pasuquin shoreline since 2011, says the seasonal movement may be a way for the birds to "socialize". Other theories suggest the pigeons fly down to the coast to ingest calcium and other nutrients that are needed to strengthen their egg shells. Others say the birds travel to the coast to drink or bathe in salt water.

Its breeding season is believed to be from February to July based on birds collected with in breeding condition with enlarged gonads. Only one nest has ever been recorded which was found in May in Mindoro. Unusual among pigeons, its nest was located in a hollow in a low cliff. Its nest was a platform of twigs and contained just 1 white egg.

== Conservation status ==
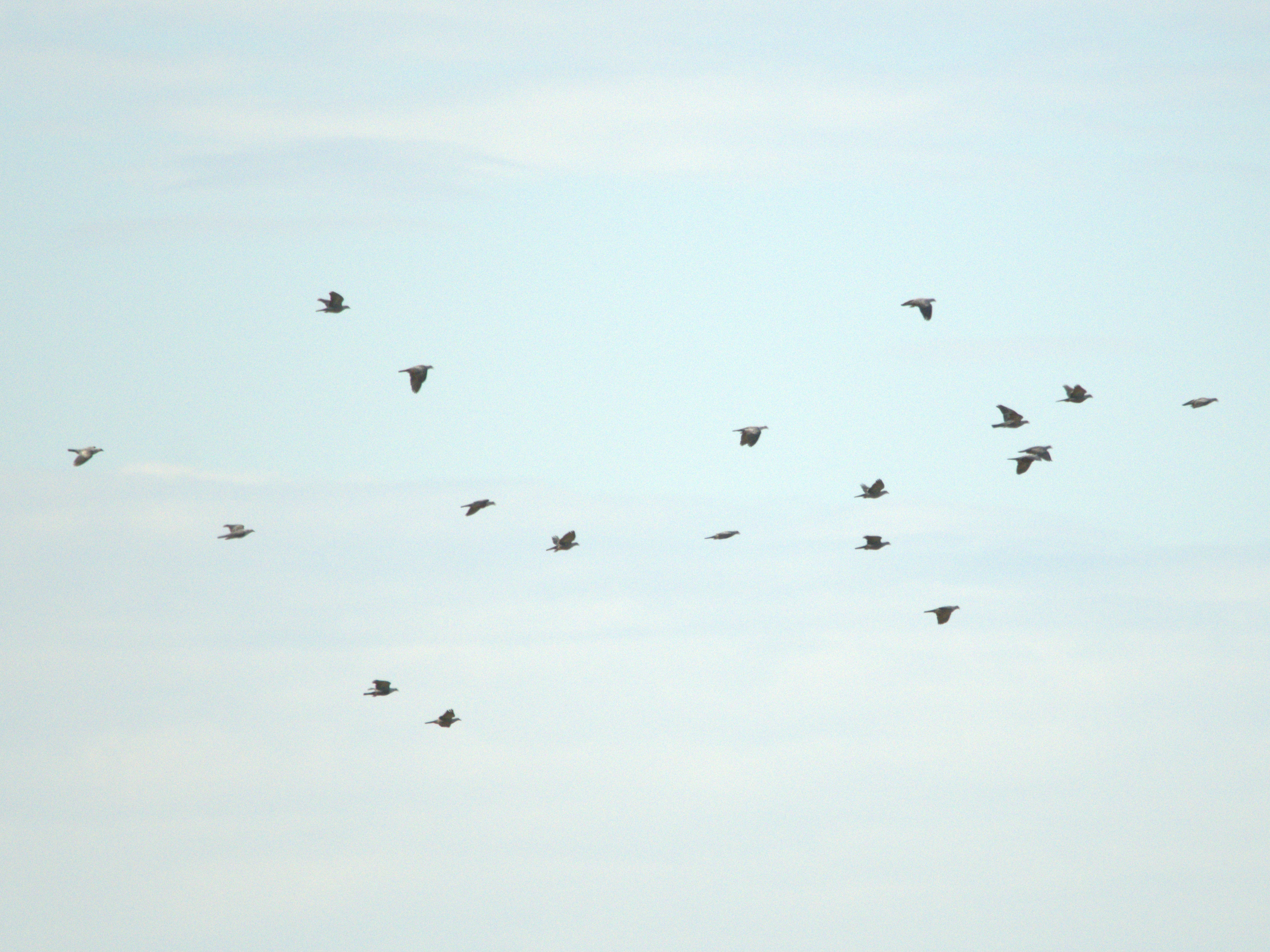
A flock of Spotted Imperial Pigeons during their annual migration seaside in Ilocos Norte.

The International Union for Conservation of Nature has assessed the species's conservation status as vulnerable. The population size is estimated at 1,200–3,200 mature individuals making it the most threatened of all Imperial pigeons in the country. This species has heavily declined due to habitat loss, hunting and the pet trade. The subspecies nigrorum is possibly extinct with no recent records in its range in Siquijor and Negros despite being described as common in the 1950s. This species still is recorded on Mindoro, Luzon and Mindanao.It occurs in the protected areas Northern Sierra Madre Natural Park, Aurora Memorial National Park, Quezon Protected Landscape, Bataan National Park, Mt. Kitanglad Natural Park but actual protection is lax. This species migratory habits also exposes it to more threats especially as it may pass through or near human settlements which makes it more prone to hunting. This species has been recorded multiple times right in the middle of the city in Metro Manila. Even in its destination of limestone shorelines, its tendency to form large flocks in open areas makes this species easily found and hunted.
