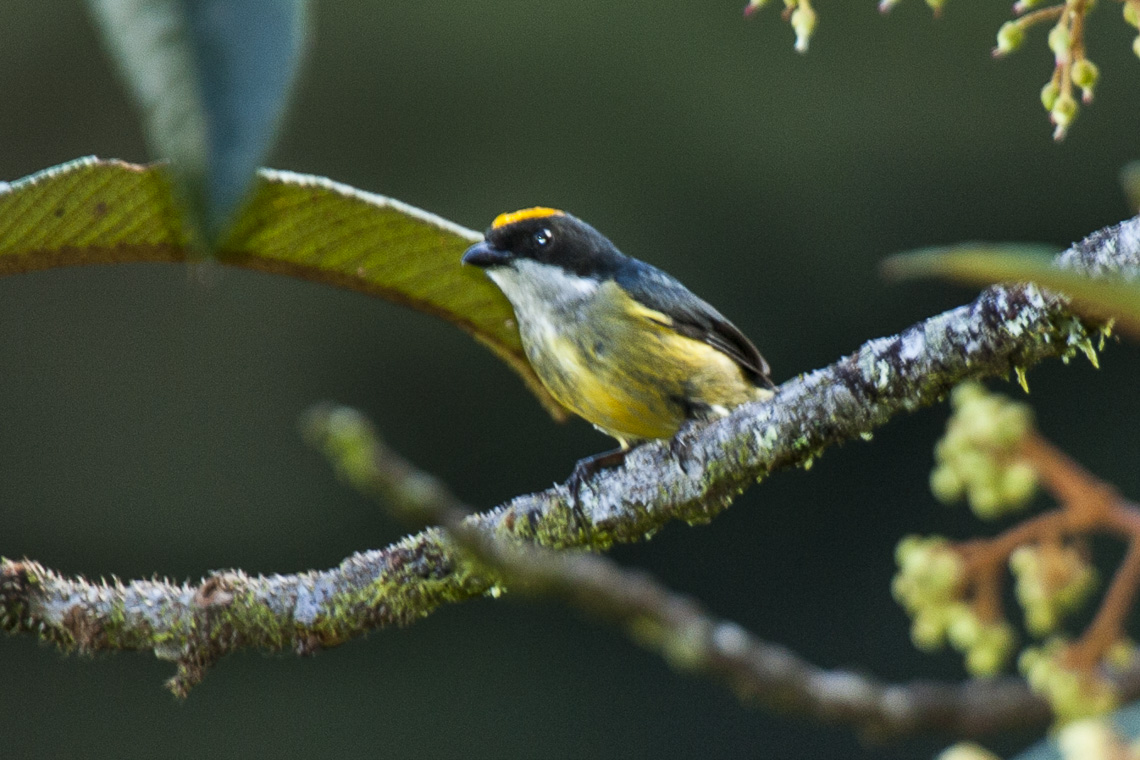

Conservation status
- Least Concern (IUCN 3.1)

Scientific classification
- Kingdom: Animalia
- Phylum: Chordata
- Class: Aves
- Order: Passeriformes
- Family: Dicaeidae
- Genus: Dicaeum
- Species: D. anthonyi

Binomial name
- Dicaeum anthonyi (McGregor, RC, 1914)

= Yellow-crowned flowerpecker =

Species of bird

The yellow-crowned flowerpecker (Dicaeum anthonyi) is a species of bird in the family Dicaeidae. It is endemic to Luzon Island in the Philippines. It was formerly conspecific with the flame-crowned flowerpecker of Mindanao. Its natural habitat is tropical moist montane forest. It is becoming rare due to habitat loss.

== Description and taxonomy ==
The yellow-crowned flowerpecker was formally described in 1914 by the Australian-American ornithologist Richard Crittenden McGregor as Prionochilus anthonyi based on a specimen collected on Mount Polis, Province of Ifugao on the island of Luzon in the Philippines. McGregor chose the specific epithet to honour the American mining engineer and ornithologist Alfred Webster Anthony.

Exhibits sexual dimorphism in which males have the eponymous yellow crown and vent while females are much more dull and have uniform olive color and does not the black upperparts

It was formerly conspecific with the flame-crowned flowerpecker but differs with its yellow crown and vent and yellowish belly.

== Ecology and behavior ==
Feeds on small fruits, the nectar of mistletoes and flowers.Found singly, in pairs or mixed species flocks with other flowerpeckers and small birds. Often observed near fruiting and flowering trees.

Its breeding ecology is completely undescribed with no documentation of its mating habits, nest, eggs and fledgeling.

== Habitat and conservation status ==
It inhabits tropical moist montane forest from 1,500 to 2,000 meters above sea level.

The International Union for Conservation of Nature assessed this species in 2023 as Least-concern. Prior to this, it was assessed as near threatened with its population being estimated as 10,000 to 19,999 mature individuals. This species is uncommon throughout its range.

The current assessment states that the population is supposedly stable. However, forest loss is a threat especially in its lower altitude limits which are more prone to legal and illegal logging, mining and conversion into farmland and road development.

It is recommended to investigate potential threats and quantify more precisely the population size of the species. Protect areas of suitable habitat and safeguard against deforestation.
