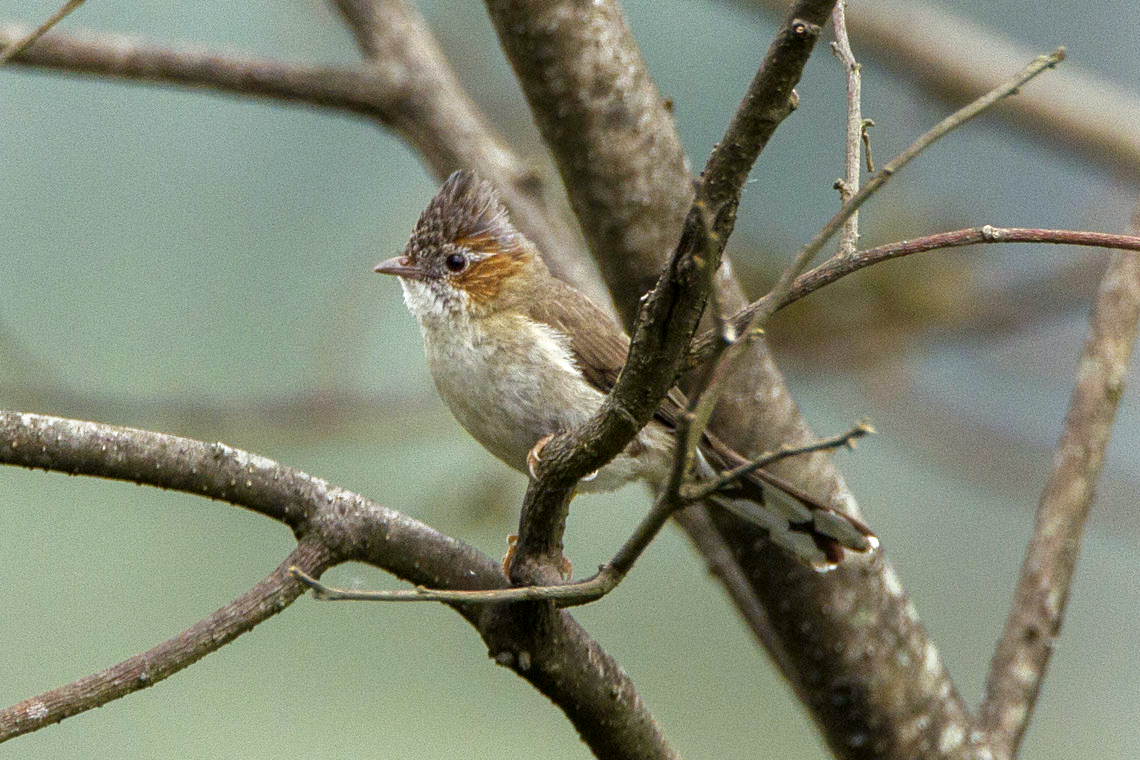

Conservation status
- Least Concern (IUCN 3.1)

Scientific classification
- Kingdom: Animalia
- Phylum: Chordata
- Class: Aves
- Order: Passeriformes
- Family: Zosteropidae
- Genus: Staphida
- Species: S. castaniceps

Binomial name
- Staphida castaniceps (Moore, F, 1854)

Synonyms
- Yuhina castaniceps

= Striated yuhina =

Species of bird

The striated yuhina (Staphida castaniceps) is a bird species in the white-eye family Zosteropidae.

It is found from the Himalayas to north-western Thailand. Its natural habitats are subtropical or tropical moist lowland forests and subtropical or tropical moist montane forests.

== Gallery ==
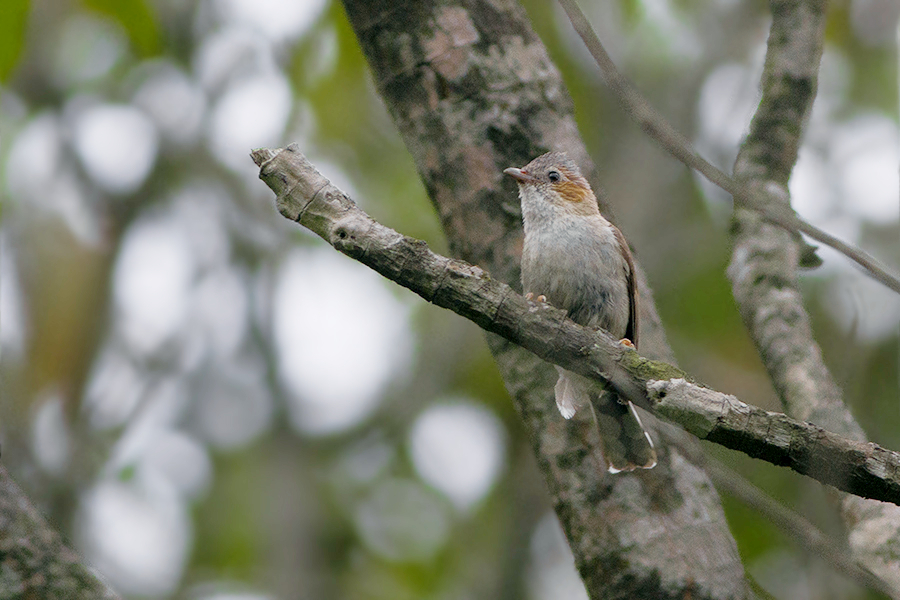
From Mahananda Wildlife Sanctuary in West Bengal, India

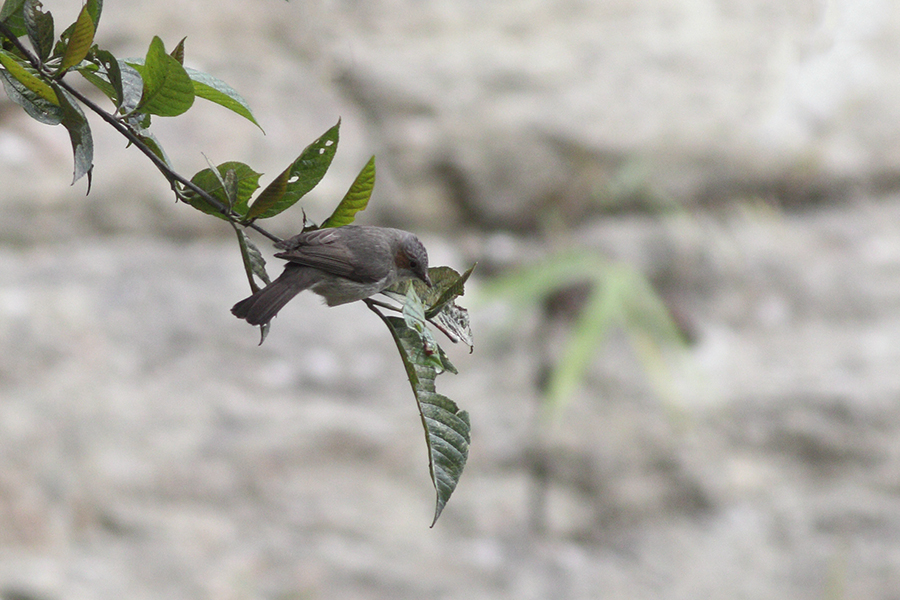
From Eaglenest Wildlife Sanctuary in Arunachal Pradesh, India
