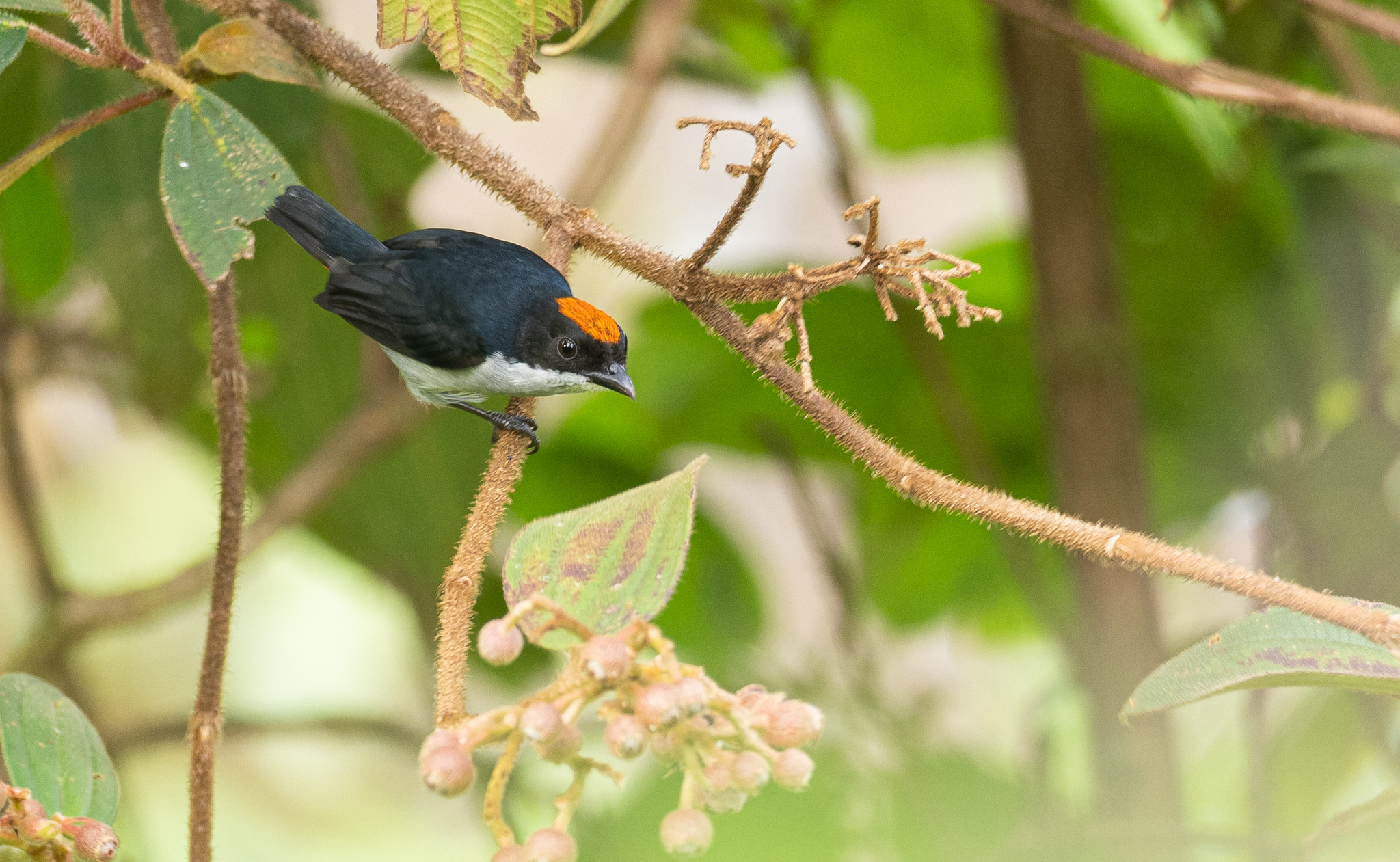
- Male

Conservation status
- Least Concern (IUCN 3.1)

Scientific classification
- Kingdom: Animalia
- Phylum: Chordata
- Class: Aves
- Order: Passeriformes
- Family: Dicaeidae
- Genus: Dicaeum
- Species: D. kampalili

Binomial name
- Dicaeum kampalili Manuel & Gilliard, 1953

= Flame-crowned flowerpecker =

Species of bird

The flame-crowned flowerpecker (Dicaeum kampalili) is a species of bird in the family Dicaeidae. It is endemic to Mindanao in the Philippines. The yellow-crowned flowerpecker (Dicaeum anthonyi), which is endemic to Luzon, was formerly considered conspecific.

== Description and taxonomy ==
Exhibits sexual dimorphism in which males have the eponymous flame orange crown and vent while females are much more dull and have uniform olive color and does not the black upperparts

This species was formerly conspecific with the Yellow-crowned flowerpecker but is now recognized as distinct species. It differs mostly in the males with its orange crown, gray throat, grayish white belly and scarlet undertail and smaller size.

=== Subspecies ===
Two subspecies are recognized:

- D. k. kampalili – Found on Mindanao except Western area
- D. k. masawan – Found on West Mindanao; yellow tinge on breast and flanks and the abdomen is yellowish white

== Ecology and behavior ==
Feeds on small fruits, the nectar of mistletoes and flowers.Found singly, in pairs or mixed species flocks with other flowerpeckers and small birds. Often observed near fruiting and flowering trees. Nest is undescribed. Juveniles have been seen from April to October.

== Habitat and conservation status ==
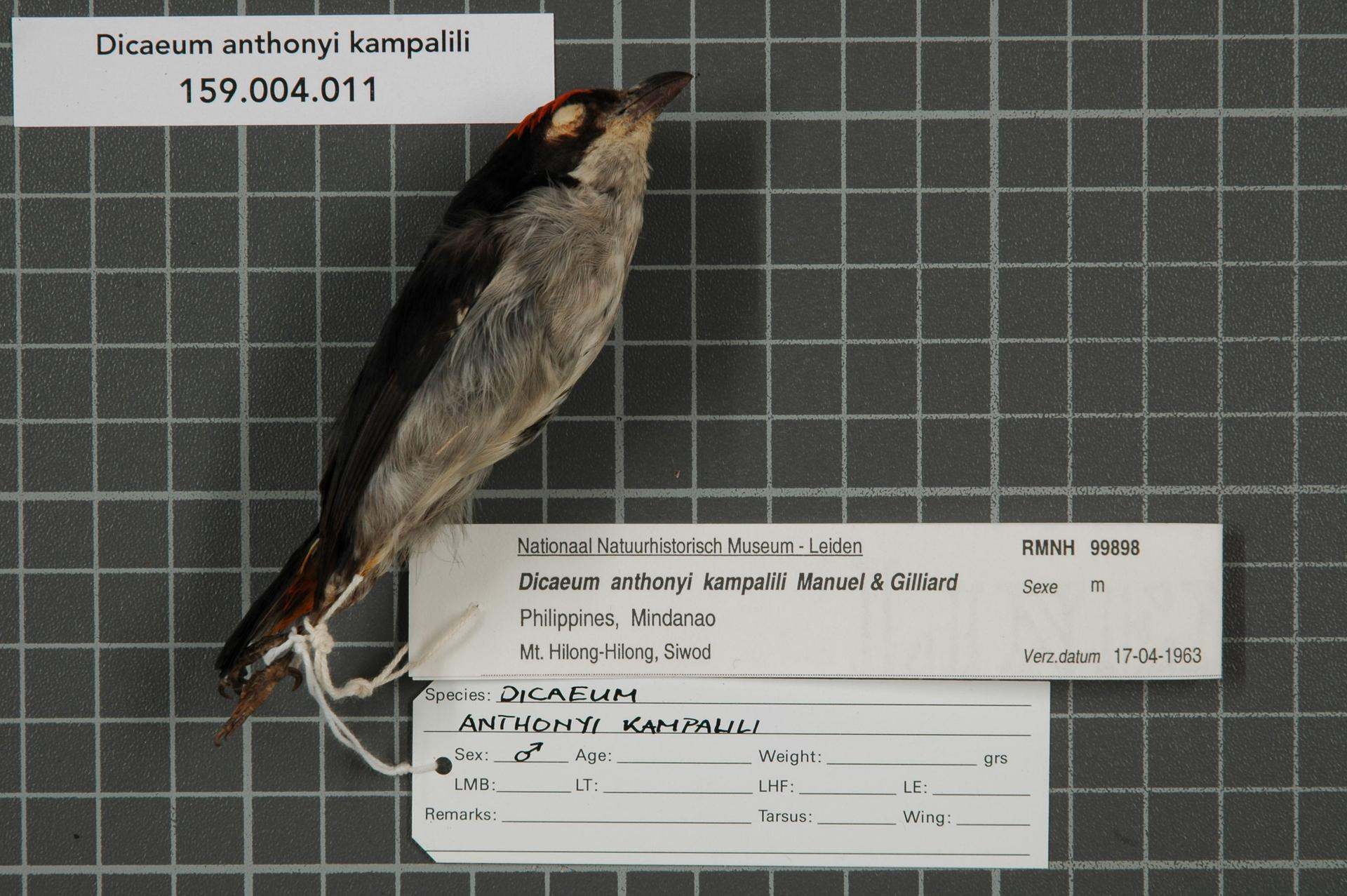
Preserved specimen at Naturalis Biodiversity Center

It inhabits tropic moist montane forest at mossy forest above 1,300 meters above sea level.

IUCN has assessed this bird as least-concern with its population being estimated as 10,000 to 19,999 mature individuals. While not considered threatened, it is still thought to be declining. Forest loss is a threat especially in its lower altitude limits which are more prone to legal and illegal logging, mining and conversion into farmland.

It is recommended to investigate potential threats and quantify more precisely the population size of the species. Protect areas of suitable habitat and safeguard against deforestation.
