= Aurora Memorial National Park =

Protected area of the Philippines

- IUCN category V (protected landscape/seascape)
- Location within Philippines
- Location: Nueva Ecija and Aurora, Philippines
- Nearest city: Cabanatuan, Nueva Ecija, Philippines
- Coordinates: 15°28′N 121°25′E
- Area: 5,676 hectares (14,030 acres)
- Established: 1937
- Governing body: Department of Environment and Natural Resources

Aurora Memorial National Park is a protected area of the Philippines located within the Sierra Madre mountain range between the provinces of Nueva Ecija and Aurora in Central Luzon.

== History ==
Originally named Boñgabon-Baler National Park, the site was established in 1937 by virtue of Proclamation No. 220 by President Manuel L. Quezon. The park initially had an area of 2,356 hectares (5,820 acres). By 1941, its size was more than doubled to its current area. In May 1949 the park was dedicated to former First Lady Aurora Aragon Quezon.

== Geography and environment ==
The Aurora Memorial National Park covers an area of 5,676 ha (14,030 acres) stretching over 50 km along the scenic Bongabon-Baler road.

The maximum altitude of the park is reported to be 1,000 m, so the main forest type inside the park must be lowland dipterocarp, with only limited areas of montane forest. Land uses inside the park include both permanent and shifting agriculture (kaingin) and forestry.

=== Wildlife ===
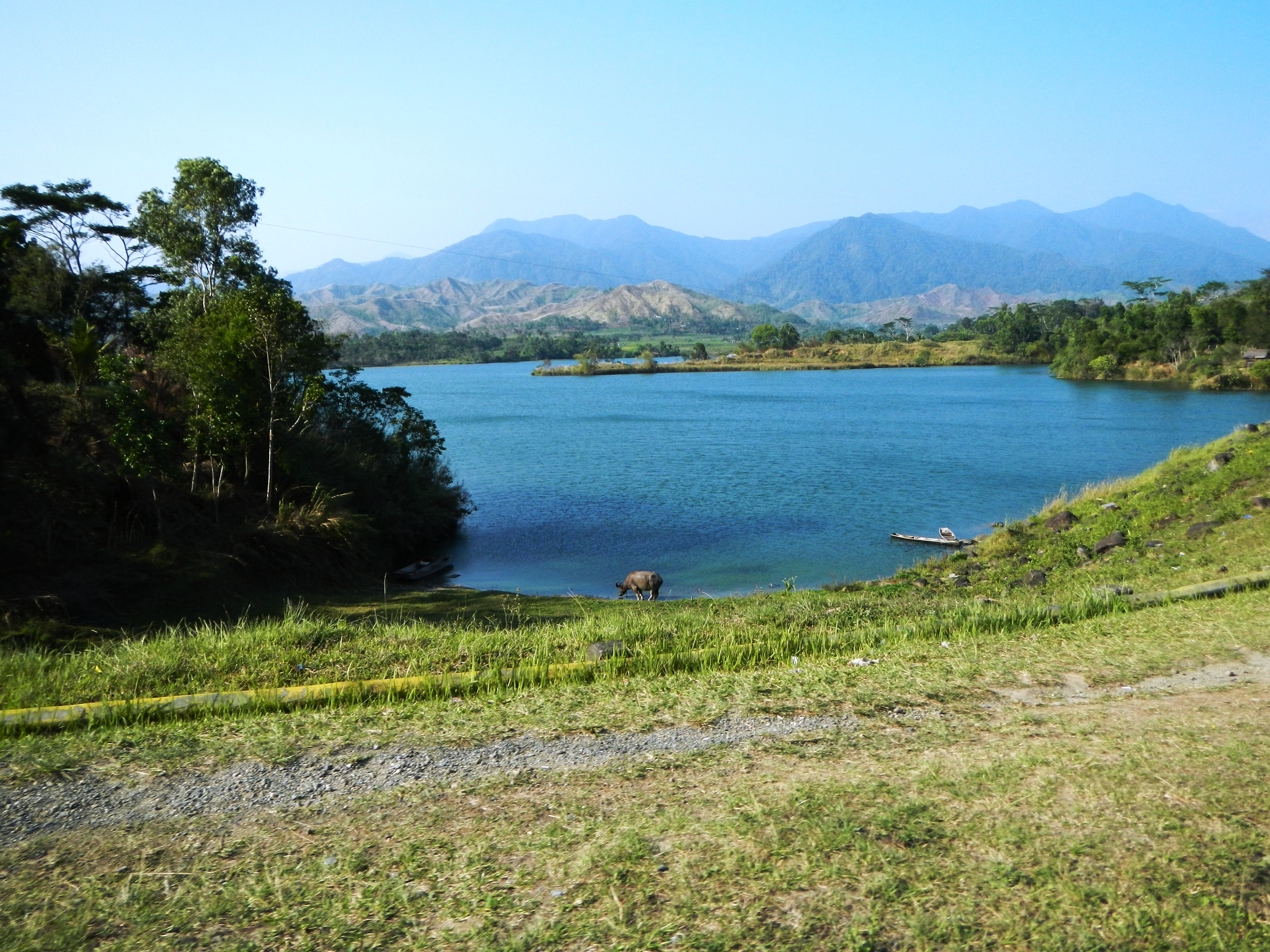
Canili Dam in Maria Aurora

The park is promoted by the local government as an eco-tourism destination containing some of the most important rainforests in this part of the region. Its location in the Sierra Madre range provides a rich habitat to a diverse flora and fauna, including several species of amphibians, reptiles and birds. The park has been designated an Important Bird Area (IBA) by BirdLife International because it supports significant populations of Philippine ducks, spotted imperial-pigeons, flame-breasted fruit-doves, Philippine eagles, Philippine hawk-eagles, green racket-tails, whiskered pittas, golden-crowned and Luzon striped babblers, and Luzon water-redstarts.

== See also ==
- List of national parks of the Philippines
