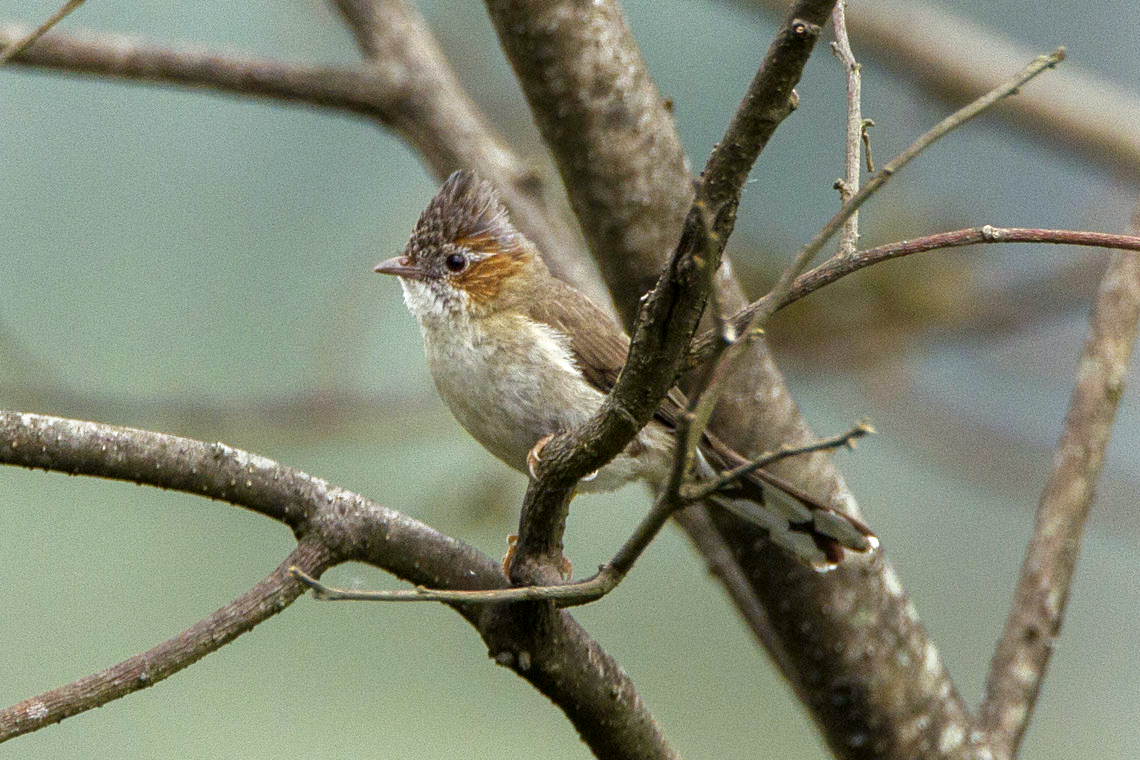
- Striated yuhina, Staphida castaniceps

Scientific classification
- Kingdom: Animalia
- Phylum: Chordata
- Class: Aves
- Order: Passeriformes
- Family: Zosteropidae
- Genus: Staphida; Swinhoe, 1871

Type species
- Siva torqueola (Indochinese yuhina) Swinhoe, 1870

Species
- see text

= Staphida =

Genus of birds

Staphida is a genus of passerine birds in the white-eye family Zosteropidae.

== Taxonomy ==
These species were formerly placed in the genus Yuhina. A molecular phylogenetic study published in 2019 found that Yuhina was not monophyletic. To create monophyletic genera these three species were moved to the resurrected genus Staphida that had originally been introduced in 1871 to accommodate the Indochinese yuhina by the English naturalist Robert Swinhoe in John Gould's The Birds of Asia.

The genus contains the following three species:

Image	Common name	Scientific name	Distribution
	Chestnut-crested yuhina	Staphida everetti	montane Borneo
	Striated yuhina	Staphida castaniceps	Himalayas to north-western Thailand
	Indochinese yuhina	Staphida torqueola	southern China and northern Indochina
