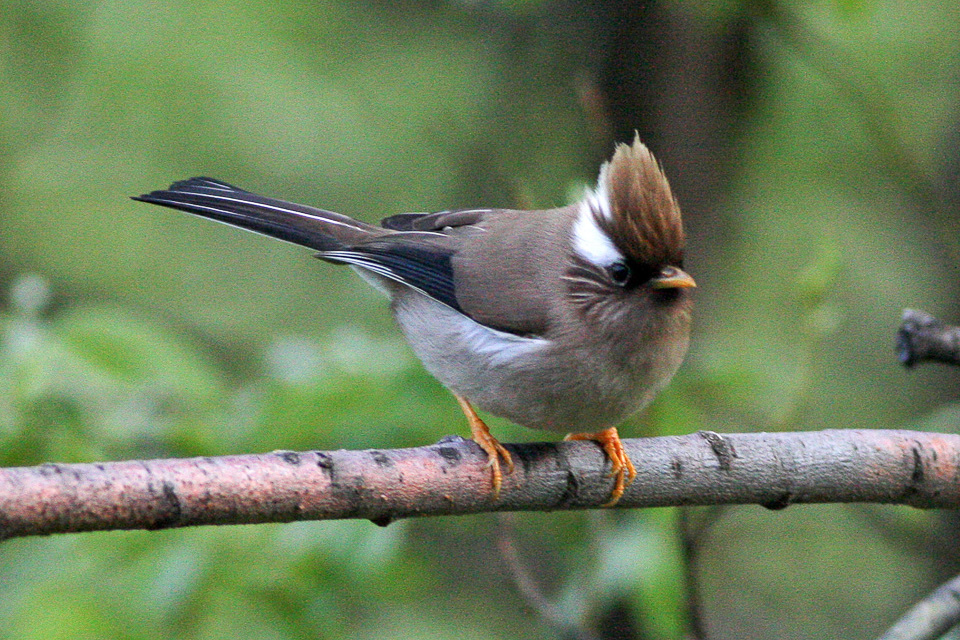
- In Taibai Shan, Shaanxi, China

Conservation status
- Least Concern (IUCN 3.1)

Scientific classification
- Kingdom: Animalia
- Phylum: Chordata
- Class: Aves
- Order: Passeriformes
- Family: Zosteropidae
- Genus: Parayuhina; Cai T, Cibois, Alström, Moyle, Kennedy, JD, Shao S, Zhang R, Irestedt, Ericson, Gelang, Qu Y, Lei W & Fjeldså, 2019
- Species: P. diademata

Binomial name
- Parayuhina diademata (Verreaux, 1869)

Synonyms
- Yuhina diademata

= White-collared yuhina =

Species of bird

The white-collared yuhina (Parayuhina diademata) is a bird species in the white-eye family Zosteropidae.

It is found in China, Myanmar, and Vietnam. Its natural habitat is subtropical or tropical moist montane forests.
