= Luzon buttonquail =

Conservation status
- Data Deficient (IUCN 3.1)

Scientific classification
- Kingdom: Animalia
- Phylum: Chordata
- Class: Aves
- Order: Charadriiformes
- Family: Turnicidae
- Genus: Turnix
- Species: T. worcesteri

Binomial name
- Turnix worcesteri McGregor, 1904

Species of bird

The Luzon buttonquail (Turnix worcesteri) or Worcester's buttonquail, is a species of bird in the family Turnicidae. It is endemic to the island of Luzon in the Philippines. Its natural habitat is tropical high-altitude grassland. This is the most mysterious bird of Luzon as there has only been 1 sighting in 2009 of a trapped individual being sold for bushmeat.

== Description and taxonomy ==
The Luzon buttonquail was formally described in 1904 by the Australian/American ornithologist Richard Crittenden McGregor as Turnix worcesteri based on a specimen purchased in the Quinta Market, Manila that had probably come from Parañaque, Luzon. McGregor chose the specific epithet to honour the American zoologist Dean Conant Worcester.

This species is monotypic but is sometimes considered conspecific with the Sumba buttonquail and the Common buttonquail it is distinguished from latter by plumage with a much blacker crown and dorsal feathers, much smaller size and, white chin and upper throat for females.

== Ecology and behavior ==
Barely anything is known about this bird. The stomach contents from a trapped bird contained insects.

== Habitat and conservation status ==
Its precise habitat is unknown but is believe to be wet grassy areas. Only modern record is from a bushmeat market in Dalton Pass in 2009. The Luzon buttonquail was known only from drawings and descriptions until January 2009 when a local birdwatching group, the Wild Bird Club of the Philippines, took photos and recorded a video of a lone specimen at a public market in the Caraballo Mountains. The bird from Nueva Vizcaya, northern Luzon, appeared in a news feature by documentary filmmaker Howie Severino, a member of the GMA Network.

IUCN has assessed this bird as Data deficient but was formerly listed as Vulnerable. Despite just having 1 record, it is believed that it may be especially cryptic and unobtrusive leading it to be under-recorded. Extensive research and study is required. However, it is likely that this species is threatened due to continued hunting and habitat conversion.

== Bibliography ==
Mark Niel Maceda 2007
