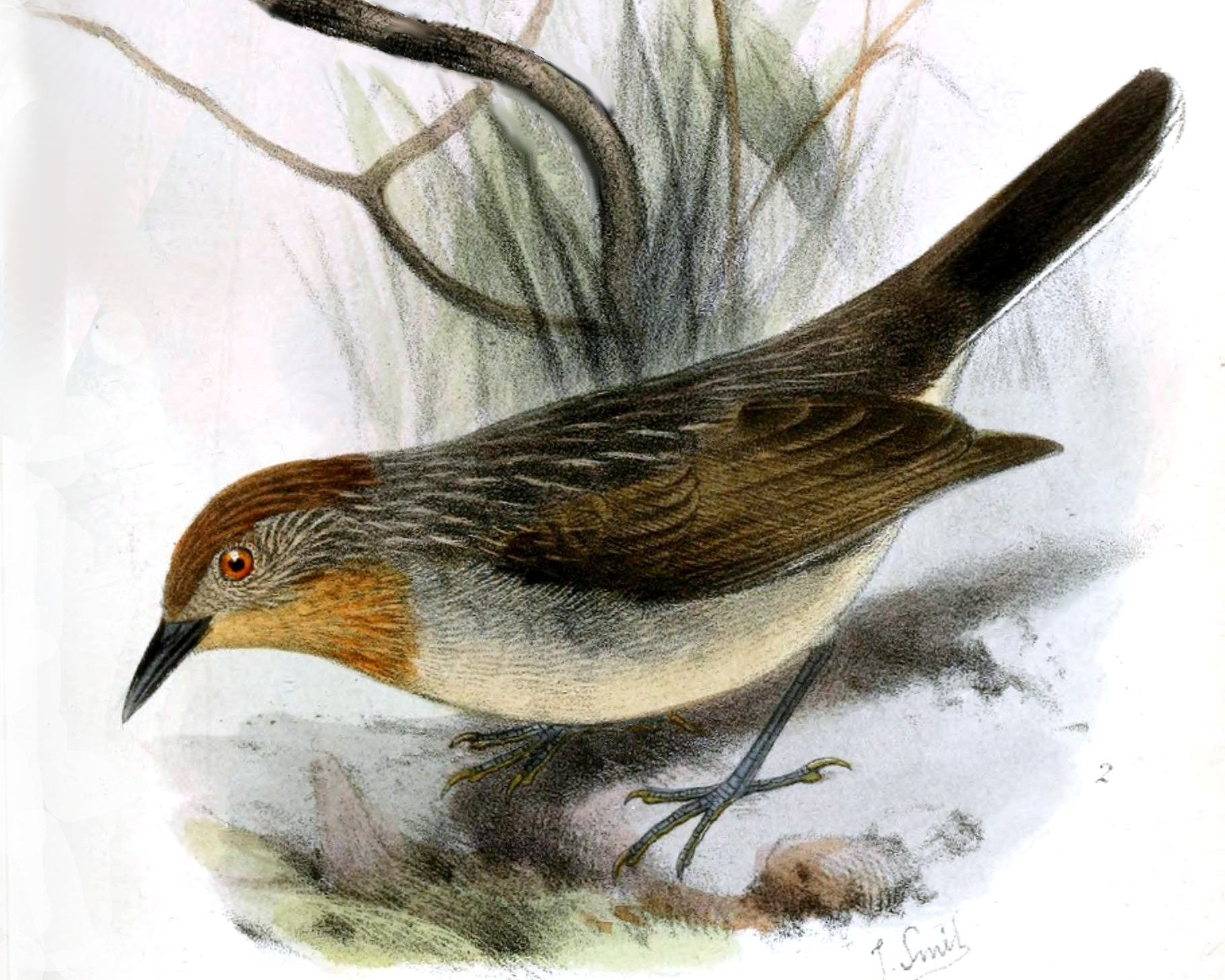
- Adult female of Rusty-crowned Babbler

Scientific classification
- Kingdom: Animalia
- Phylum: Chordata
- Class: Aves
- Order: Passeriformes
- Family: Zosteropidae
- Genus: Sterrhoptilus; Oberholser, 1918

Type species
- Mixornis capitalis Tweeddale, 1877

= Sterrhoptilus =

Genus of birds

Sterrhoptilus is a songbird genus recently separated from Stachyris. It used to be placed in the family Timaliidae. With other "Old World babblers" of the genus Yuhina, it was recently determined to be better placed in the family Zosteropidae.

The genus contains the following four species:

Image	Common name	Scientific name
	Rusty-crowned babbler	Sterrhoptilus capitalis
	Golden-crowned babbler	Sterrhoptilus dennistouni
	Calabarzon babbler	Sterrhoptilus affinis – split from S. nigrocapitatus
	Visayan babbler	Sterrhoptilus nigrocapitatus
