= Black-crowned babbler =

Black-crowned babbler has been split into two species:

- Visayan babbler, Sterrhoptilus nigrocapitatus
- Calabarzon babbler, Sterrhoptilus affinis
