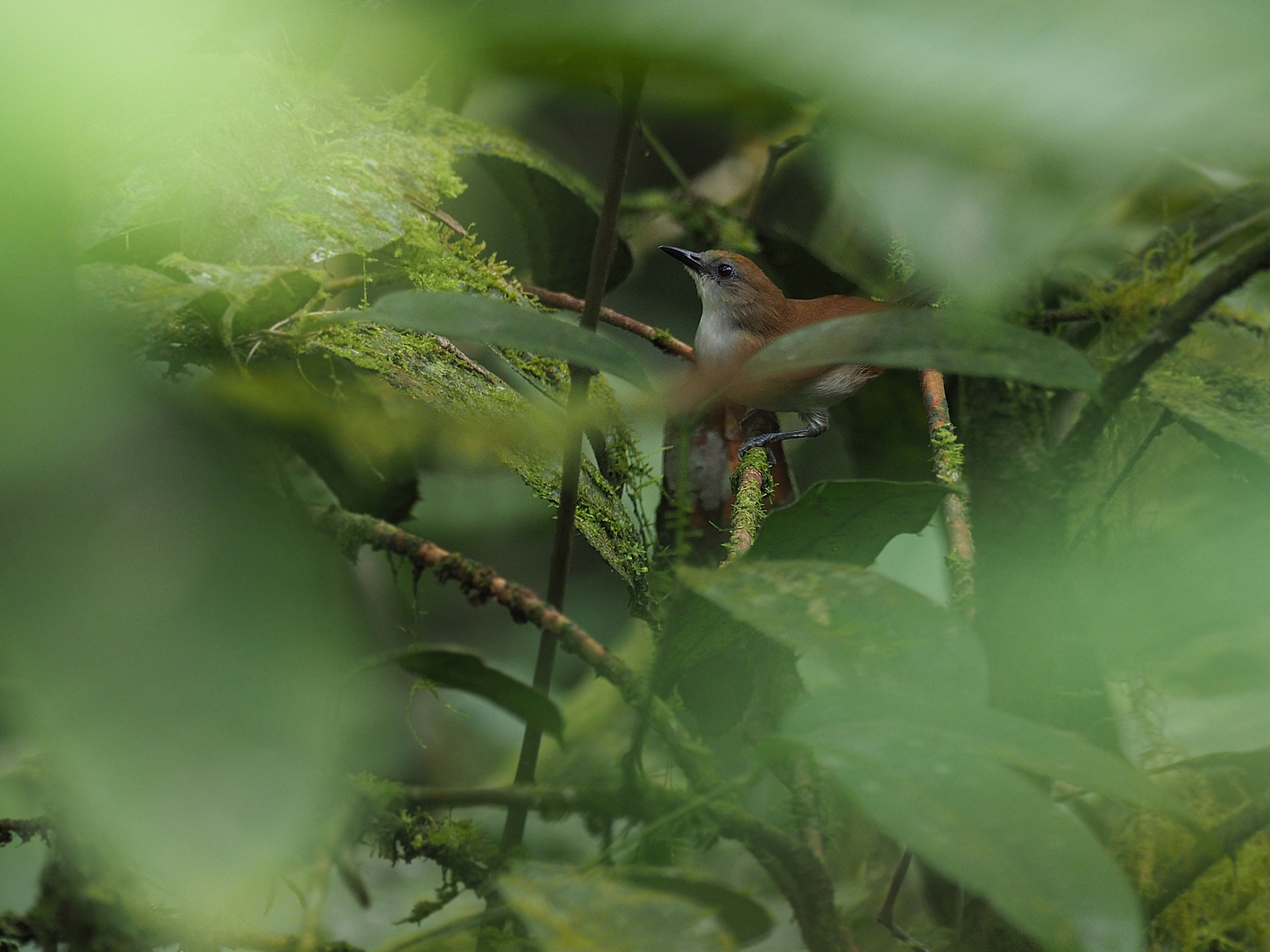

Conservation status
- Least Concern (IUCN 3.1)

Scientific classification
- Kingdom: Animalia
- Phylum: Chordata
- Class: Aves
- Order: Passeriformes
- Family: Zosteropidae
- Genus: Tephrozosterops; Stresemann, 1931
- Species: T. stalkeri

Binomial name
- Tephrozosterops stalkeri (Ogilvie-Grant, 1910)

= Rufescent darkeye =

Species of bird

The rufescent darkeye (Tephrozosterops stalkeri), also known as the bicoloured white-eye, is a species of bird in the family Zosteropidae. It is monotypic within the genus Tephrozosterops. It is endemic to the island of Seram in Indonesia. Its natural habitats are subtropical or tropical moist lowland forest and subtropical or tropical moist montane forest.
