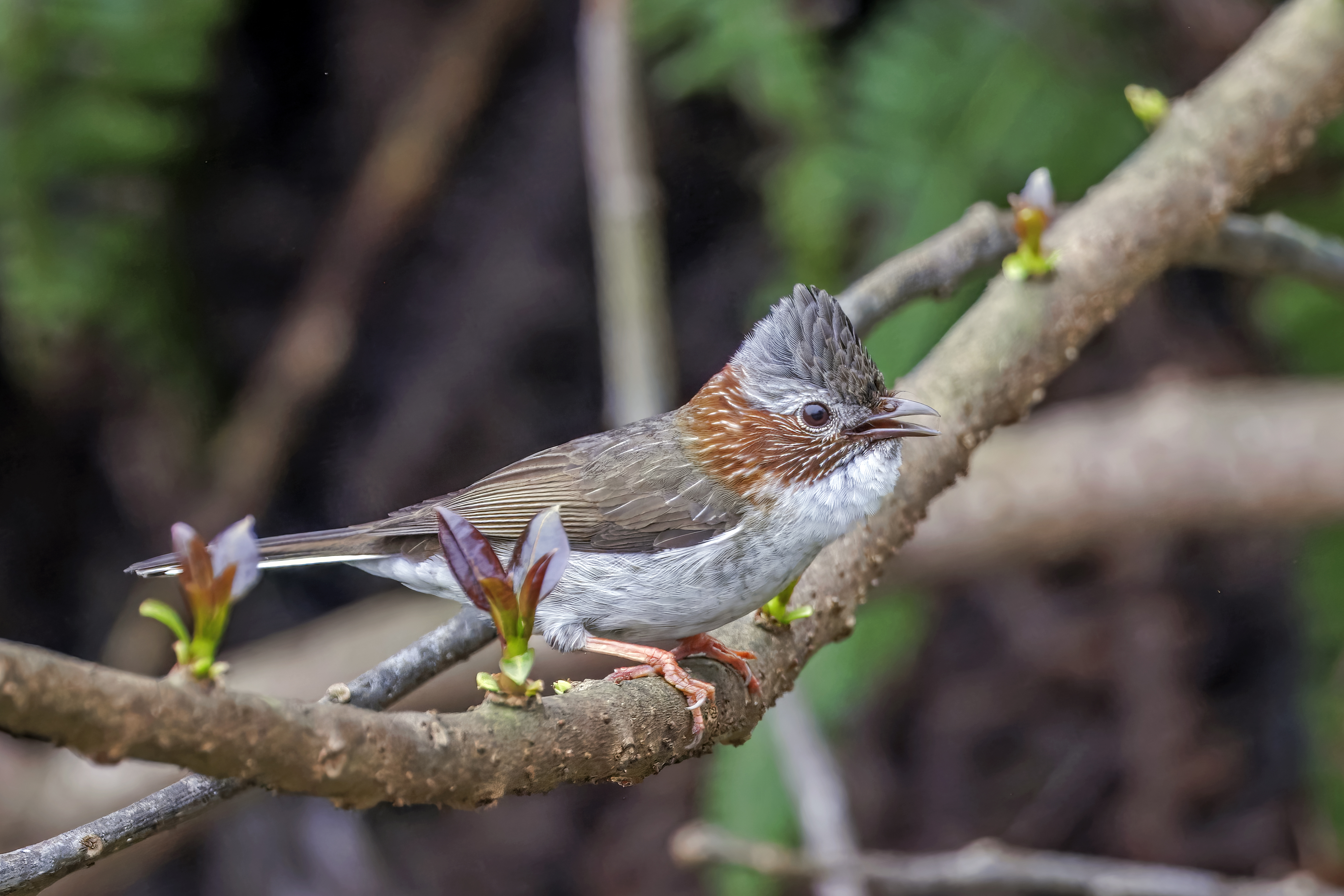
- Son Tra Nature Reserve, Vietnam

Conservation status
- Least Concern (IUCN 3.1)

Scientific classification
- Kingdom: Animalia
- Phylum: Chordata
- Class: Aves
- Order: Passeriformes
- Family: Zosteropidae
- Genus: Staphida
- Species: S. torqueola

Binomial name
- Staphida torqueola (R. Swinhoe, 1870)

Synonyms
- Yuhina torqueola

= Indochinese yuhina =

Species of bird

The Indochinese yuhina or chestnut-collared yuhina (Staphida torqueola) is a bird in the family Zosteropidae. The species was first described by Robert Swinhoe in 1870.
