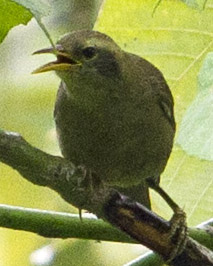
- Photographed on Peleliu

Conservation status
- Near Threatened (IUCN 3.1)

Scientific classification
- Kingdom: Animalia
- Phylum: Chordata
- Class: Aves
- Order: Passeriformes
- Family: Zosteropidae
- Genus: Megazosterops; Stresemann, 1930
- Species: M. palauensis

Binomial name
- Megazosterops palauensis (Reichenow, 1915)

= Giant white-eye =

Species of bird

The giant white-eye, or Palau greater white-eye (Megazosterops palauensis) is a species of bird in the family Zosteropidae. It is monotypic within the genus Megazosterops. It is endemic to Palau, where its natural habitat is tropical moist lowland forest. The species is currently classified as Near Threatened by the IUCN due to likely habitat loss and the possibility of the establishment of the invasive Brown tree snake on the island.The Giant White-eye is 13-14cm large. It has a pale yellowish supercilium from the eye, widening backwards. Iris, greyish to dark brown. Narrow pale-yellow eye ring. Dark loral area leading to dark greying ear-coverts with pale yellow mottling. Dark fulvous olive over, crown feathers, greyish towards bases. Slightly buffy flanks. Legs tawny or olive-green with yellowish soles. It has a mottled appearance.

== Sound and Behavior ==
The Giant white-eye sounds like two Canaries (Serinus) singing at the same time. Short sibilant whistle during inflight or feeding. Downward strained whistles followed by a long trill. Rhythmic rattling surging while simultaneously up slurred whistles. Descending siren-like uttered polyphonically. They do not travel in flocks but do form flocks in December.

== Conservative Status ==
The Giant White-Eye is not globally threatened. It is considered near- threatened. They are common to abundant on Peleliu in undisturbed jungle, common on Urukthapel. They are a Restriction- range species, present in Palau EBA. Only one record from Babeldoap. Population estimated at 13,876 individuals in 1991. Population possibly declining because of gradual habitat loss. Introduction of predators could have serious adverse effects. The arrival of the brown tree-snake (Boiga irregularis) has caused extinctions on other pacific islands and would have devastating effect on present species numbers.Changing weather patterns because of climate change may also threaten the species in the future.

== Geographic Range ==
The species is currently listed as endangered because of its restricted distribution and small population size. The island's isolation and small habitat size may contribute to a restriction to the species distribution.The species is on a decline due to habitat loss. There is continuous deforestation which has resulted in a major loss in habitat area. This leaves the species with limited forest through its habitat range. This specific species has been on a slow decline at a rate of 20% over the past three generations.

== Justification ==
It is common on the islands of Ngeruktabel and Peleliu. This species isn't found on any of the other neighboring islands.

== Diet and Foraging ==
The Giant white-eye eats caterpillars, fruits, ants and nectar from flowering trees. They live solitarily or in pairs. They forage on tops of low trees and brambles.
