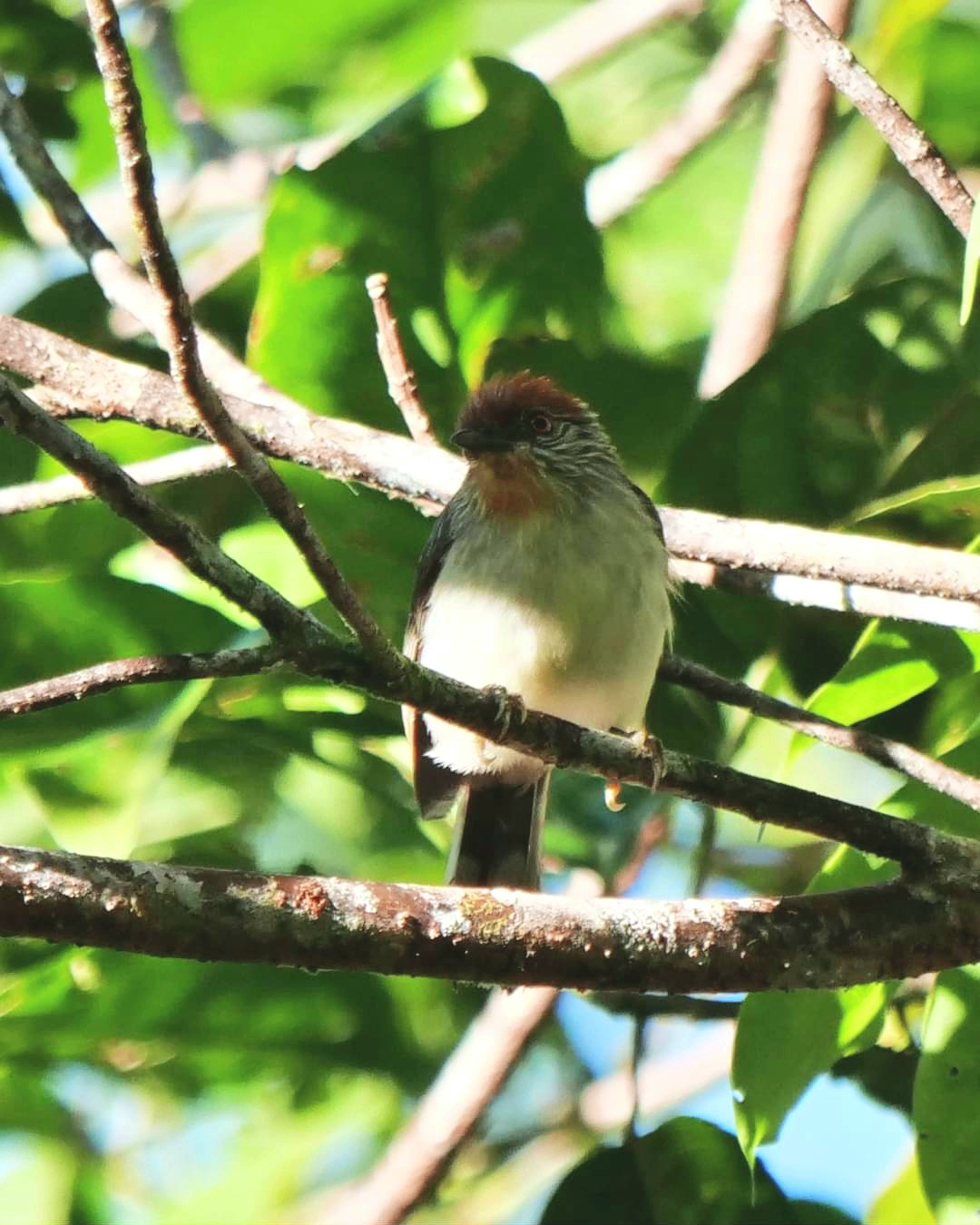

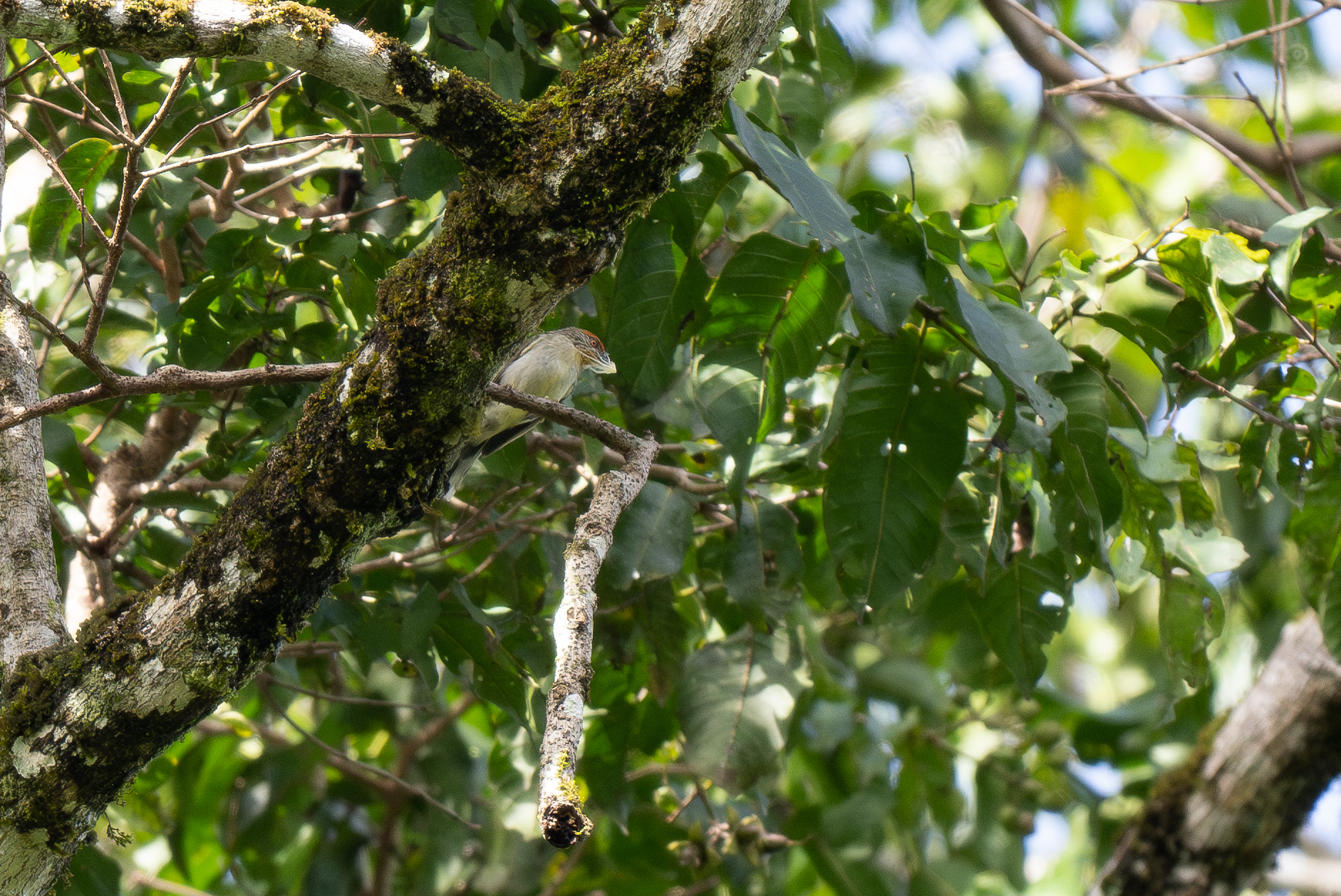

Conservation status
- Least Concern (IUCN 3.1)

Scientific classification
- Kingdom: Animalia
- Phylum: Chordata
- Class: Aves
- Order: Passeriformes
- Family: Zosteropidae
- Genus: Sterrhoptilus
- Species: S. capitalis

Binomial name
- Sterrhoptilus capitalis (Tweeddale, 1877)

= Rusty-crowned babbler =

Species of bird

The rusty-crowned babbler (Sterrhoptilus capitalis) is a species of bird in the family Zosteropidae. It is native to the southern Philippines on the islands of Mindanao and Dinagat Islands and Basilan. Its natural habitat is tropical moist lowland forest.

== Description and taxonomy ==
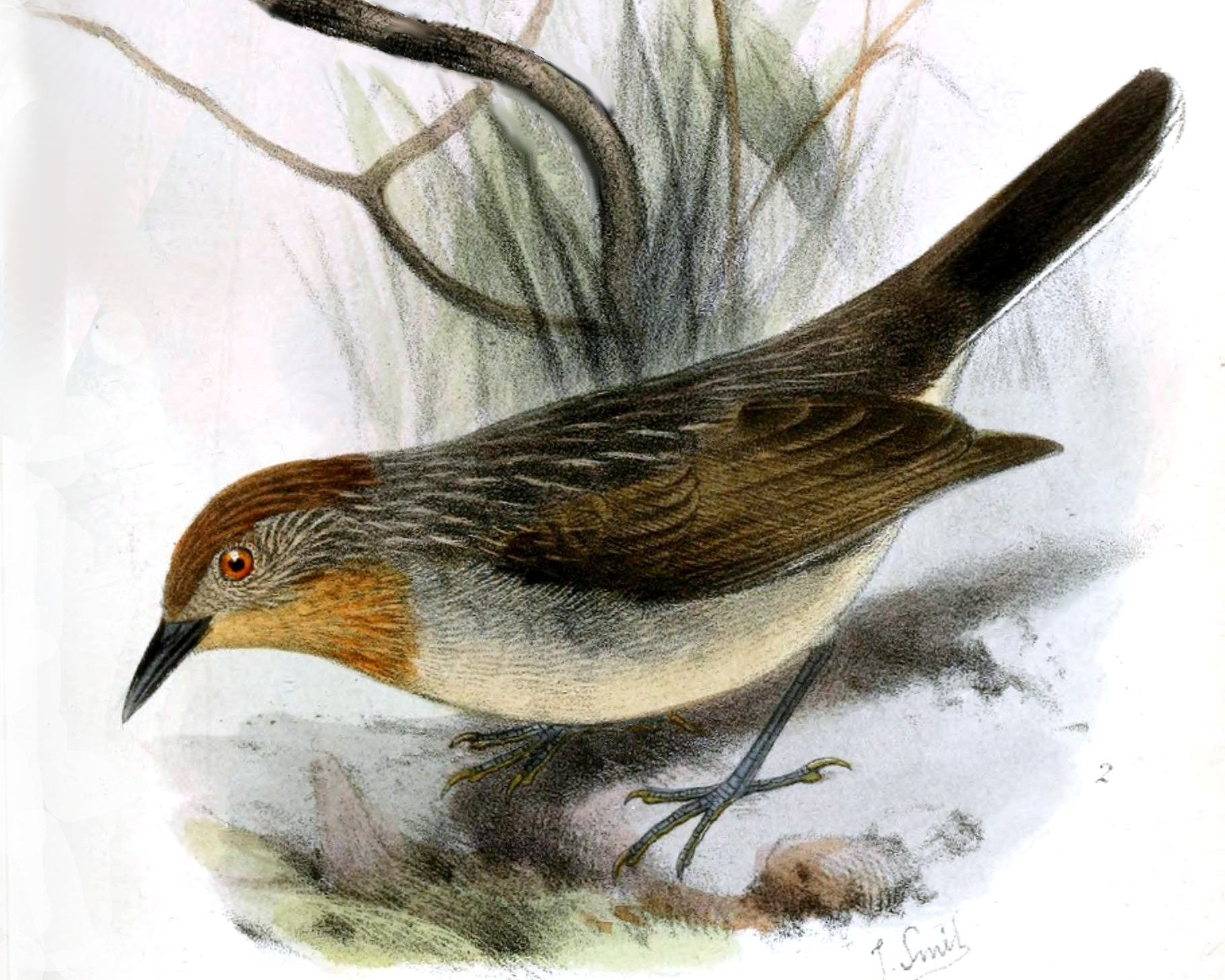
An illustration by Smit

=== Subspecies ===
Three subspecies are recognized:

- S c. capitalis – Found in Dinagat Islands
- S c. euroaustralis – Found in Mindanao Island excluding the Zamboanga Peninsula
- S c.isabelae – Found on the Zamboanga Peninsula and Basilan

== Ecology and behavior ==
Typically seen singly, in pairs or mixed flocks along with Mindanao blue-fantails, sulphur-billed nuthatches, Philippine bulbuls, brown-tit babbler, Mindanao pygmy babbler, flowerpeckers, sunbirds and other small forest birds. Its diet is presumed to consist primarily of insects and some vegetable matter.

Birds in breeding condition with enlarged gonads are seen in March and June. Immature birds have been seen in February, May and August. Otherwise, any breeding, mating, nesting and fledgling behaviours are unknown. Nest and chicks are undescribed.

== Habitat and conservation status ==
Its natural habitat is tropical moist lowland forest. It is seen on the undergrowth of primary forests or along forest edge. Most Ebird and sight records are in the PICOP Logging Concession in Bislig which has undergone massive deforestation. Its population is believed to be descreasing.

== Bibliography ==
- Collar, N. J. & Robson, C. 2007. Family Timaliidae (Babblers) pp. 70 – 291 in; del Hoyo, J., Elliott, A. & Christie, D.A. eds. Handbook of the Birds of the World, Vol. 12. Picathartes to Tits and Chickadees. Lynx Edicions, Barcelona.
