= Richard Crittenden McGregor =

American ornithologist (1871–1936)

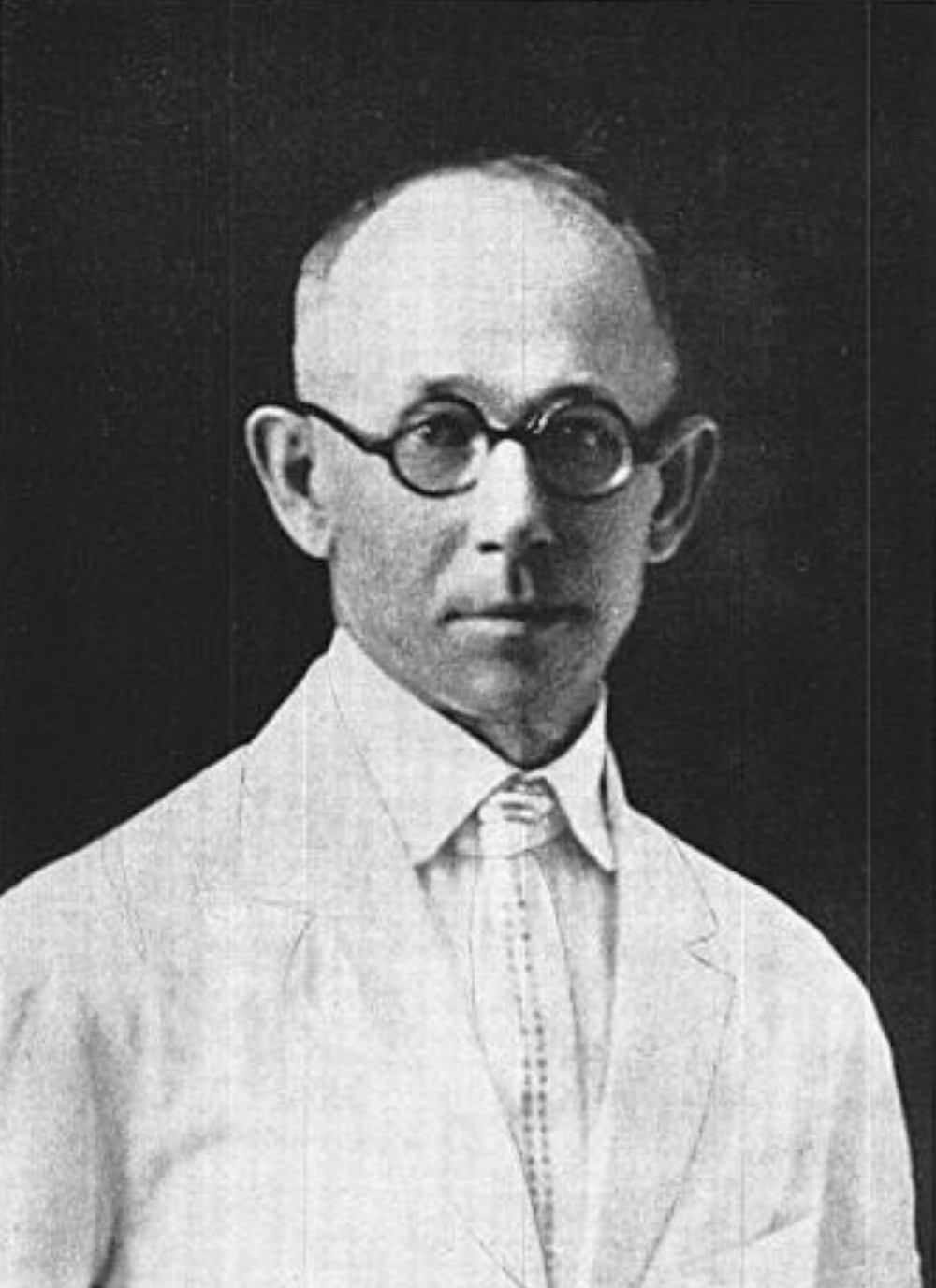
- Undated photograph of McGregor taken before 1923
- Born: 24 February 1871; Sydney, Australia
- Died: 30 December 1936 (aged 65); Manila, Philippines
- Education: Stanford University
- Known for: Ornithology of the Philippines

Richard Crittenden McGregor (24 February 1871 – 30 December 1936) was an Australian-American ornithologist and collector who specialised in the birds of the Philippines.

== Biography ==
Richard Crittenden McGregor was born in Sydney, Australian on 24 February 1871. His father died when he was one year old. His mother, Charlotte Crittenden McGregor, was born in Rochester, New York, in 1841. The mother and son moved to California in the 1880s and then to Denver, Colorado where McGregor attended high school. He studied at Stanford University in Palo Alto, graduating in 1898 with a degree in philosophy, although he had originally studied zoology.

Before and during his studies, McGregor had a keen interest in birds. Along with fellow students at Stanford, he became a member of the fledgling Cooper Ornithological Club, where he contributed his skills in collecting eggs and skinning birds. He specialized in finches and conducted fieldwork in California, Colorado, Alaska, and Hawaii. He sold his collection of 2,500 bird skins, mostly finches, to Jonathan Dwight in 1913. The collection is now in the American Museum of Natural History in New York.

In 1901, McGregor traveled via Alaska to Manila, where he was employed by the American zoologist Dean Conant Worcester as a collector. He returned to California in late 1905 to conduct fish research, but in February 1906 he returned to Manila where he remained for the rest of his life. He initially served as a collector of natural history specimens for the Philippine Bureau of Science with which he had been involved since its founding in 1902. He became editor of The Philippine Journal of Science and later served as the head of the public relations department of the Ministry of Agriculture and Commerce.

McGregor was elected as a fellow of the American Ornithologists' Union in 1907. In 1909 he published his Manual of Philippine Birds. In 1920, he published the Index to the Genera of Birds. In total, he wrote about 137 scientific papers.

McGregor formally described and named 38 bird taxa. Most of these are now treated as subspecies but the list includes four full species: the Luzon buttonquail (Turnix worcesteri), the yellow-crowned flowerpecker (Dicaeum anthonyi), the Calabarzon babbler (Sterrhoptilus affinis) and the cream-breasted fruit dove (Ramphiculus merrilli). MacGregor is commemorated in both the English and scientific names of McGregor's cuckooshrike (Malindangia mcgregori) that was described by the American ornithologist Edgar Alexander Mearns in 1907.
