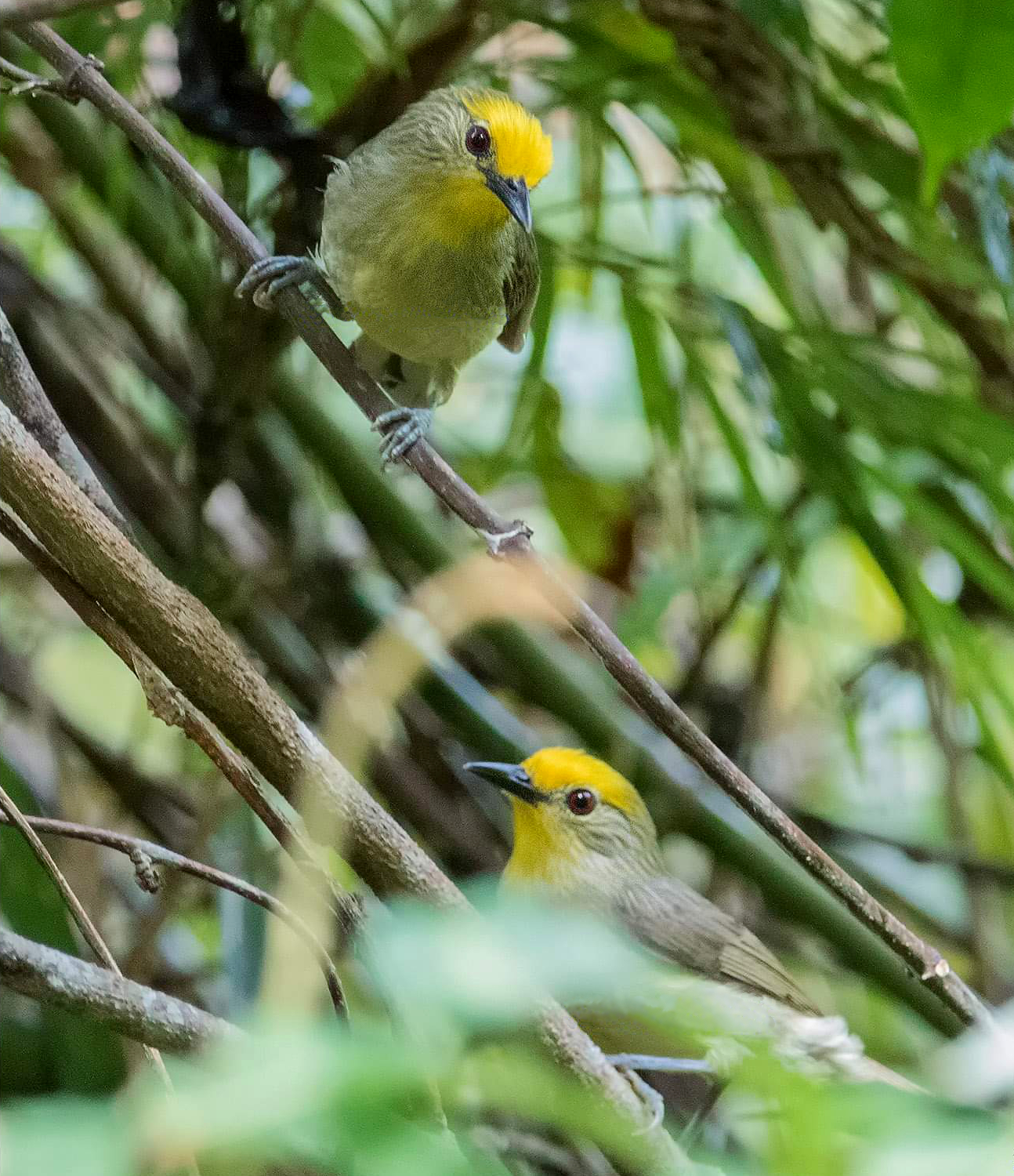

Conservation status
- Near Threatened (IUCN 3.1)

Scientific classification
- Kingdom: Animalia
- Phylum: Chordata
- Class: Aves
- Order: Passeriformes
- Family: Zosteropidae
- Genus: Sterrhoptilus
- Species: S. dennistouni

Binomial name
- Sterrhoptilus dennistouni (Ogilvie-Grant, 1895)

= Golden-crowned babbler =

Species of bird

The golden-crowned babbler (Sterrhoptilus dennistouni) is a species of bird in the family Zosteropidae. It is endemic to the Philippines found only in the moist tropical forest in Northern Luzon. It is threatened by habitat loss.

== Description ==
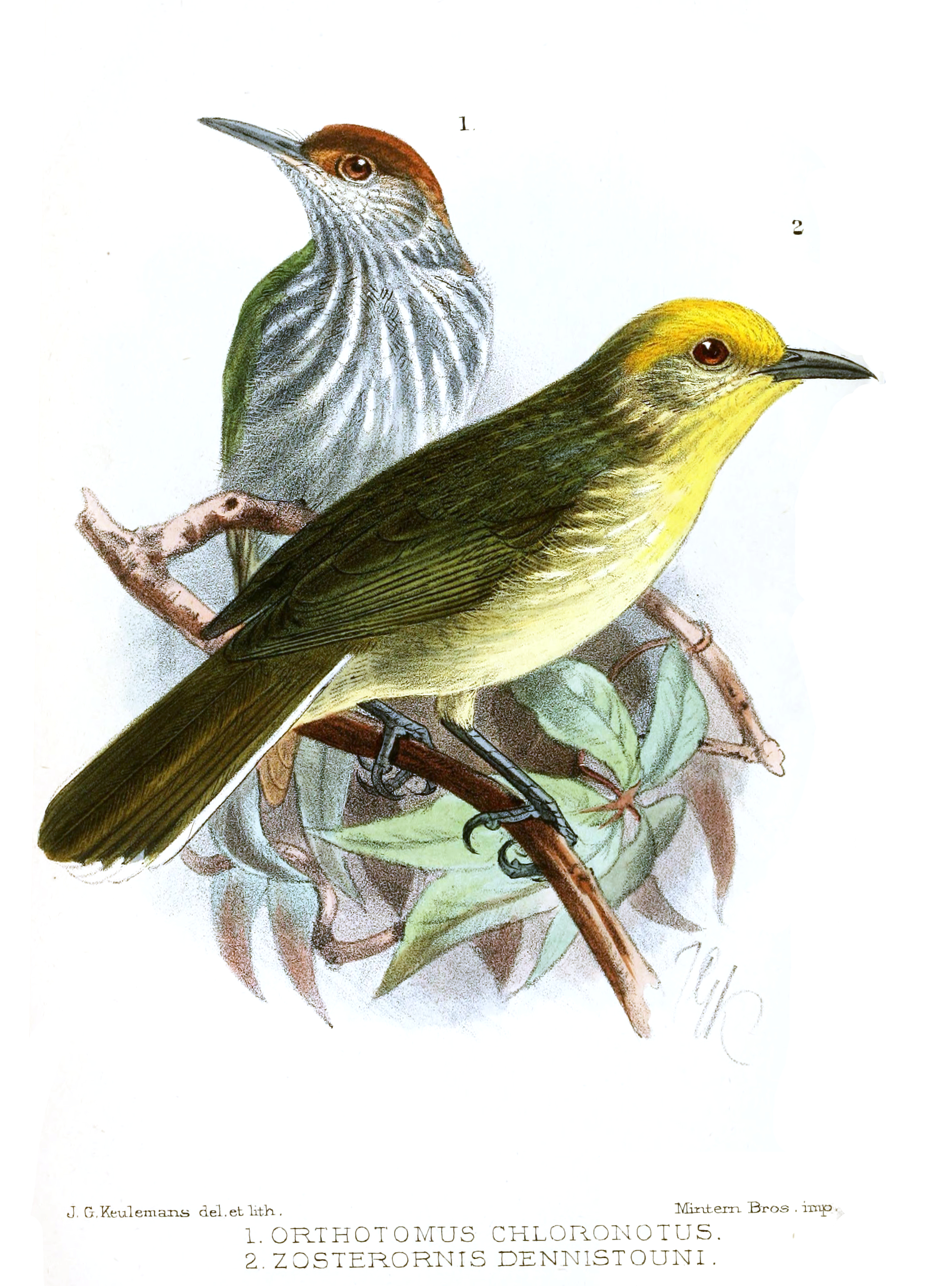
An illustration of a golden-crowned babbler (right) with a trilling tailorbird (left)

This is a small bird found in lowland and foothill forest of Northern Luzon. It has a grayish back and cheek with faint streakings and has white outer tail feathers and underparts. It has a throat and crown are bright gold from which it derrives its name. This species is closer related to White-eyes and are in the same family as them and not related to true babblers in the Timaliidae family

This species is monotypic.

The golden-crowned babbler has been known to interbreed with the Calabarzon babbler in areas where their range overlaps.

== Ecology and behavior ==
Feeds on berries, small fruits and insects. They are spotted foraging alone, in pairs or in mixed flocks with other species like the blue-headed fantail, rufous paradise flycatcher, lemon-throated leaf warbler, yellow-wattled bulbul, white-eyes, sunbirds and flowerpeckers. Forages in all levels but is usually seen in the understorey where it methodically gleans on leaves searching for insects.

Breeding season is believed to from April to July, which is the general breeding season for most Philippine forest bird. One nest was found that was cup shaped made out of moss and woven together with roots with small twigs just one meter above the ground. This nest contained 2 nestlings but this single nest is not enough to assume average nest size.

== Habitat and conservation status ==
Its natural habitat is tropical moist lowland forest up to 1,150 m. It is often seen in lowland and foothill forest, open wooded areas with developed understory, bamboo, and tall grass. The IUCN Redlist has classified this species as near threatened. Its threats are mainly habitat loss due to deforestation for lumber, mining and farmlands. There are no known targeted conservation actions for this bird, but it will indirectly benefit from the conservation of other North Luzon species like the Critically Endangered Isabela oriole. The stronghold of the Isabela oriole in Baggao is being proposed as a protected area and will thus preserve key habitat for this beautiful babbler.

It occurs in the Northern Sierra Madre Natural Park, Aurora Memorial National Park and Kalbario–Patapat Natural Park but enforcement from loggers and hunters is still lax.
