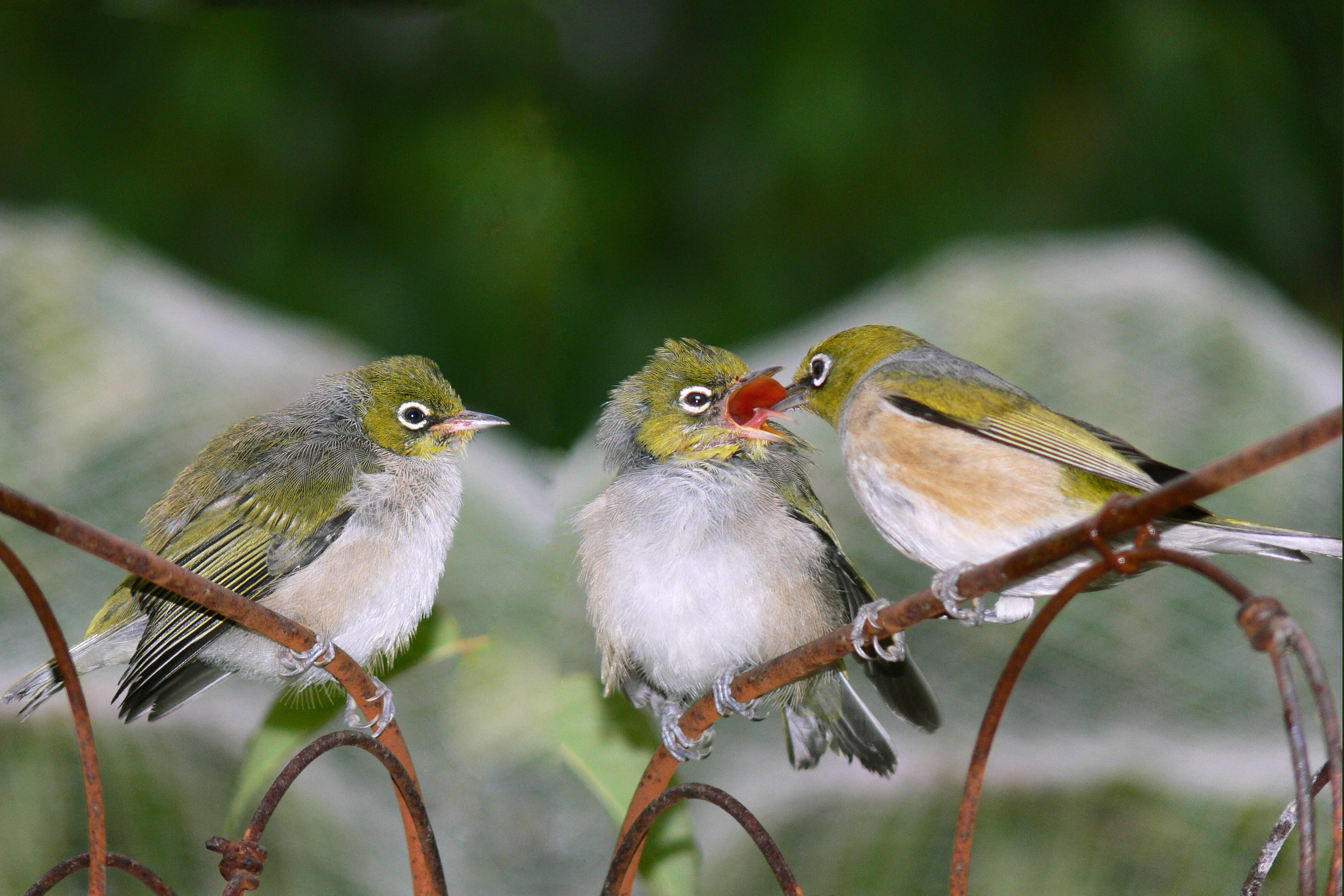
- Silvereye (Zosterops lateralis), adult (right) and juveniles

Scientific classification
- Kingdom: Animalia
- Phylum: Chordata
- Class: Aves
- Order: Passeriformes
- Superfamily: Sylvioidea
- Family: Zosteropidae; Bonaparte, 1853

Genera
- See text

= White-eye =

White-eyes

Family of birds

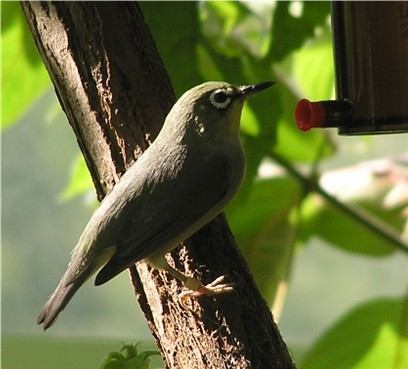
Indian white-eye, Zosterops palpebrosus

The white-eyes are a family, Zosteropidae, of small passerine birds native to tropical, subtropical and temperate Sub-Saharan Africa, southern and eastern Asia, and Australasia. White-eyes inhabit most tropical islands in the Indian Ocean, the western Pacific Ocean, and the Gulf of Guinea. Discounting some widespread members of the genus Zosterops, most species are endemic to single islands or archipelagos. The silvereye, Zosterops lateralis, naturally colonised New Zealand, where it is known as the "wax-eye" or tauhou ("stranger"), from 1855. The silvereye has also been introduced to the Society Islands in French Polynesia, while the Japanese white-eye has been introduced to Hawaii.

== Characteristics ==
White-eyes are mostly of undistinguished appearance, the plumage being generally greenish olive above, and pale grey below. Some species have a white or bright yellow throat, breast, or lower parts, and several have buff flanks. As their common name implies, many species have a conspicuous ring of tiny white feathers around their eyes. The scientific name of the group also reflects this latter feature, being derived from the Ancient Greek for "girdle-eye". They have rounded wings and strong legs. Like many other nectarivorous birds, they have slender, pointed bills, and brush-tipped tongues. The size ranges up to 15 cm (5.9 in) in length.

All the species of white-eyes are sociable, forming large flocks that only separate on the approach of the breeding season. They build trees nests and lay two to four eggs which are usually pale blue. Though mainly insectivorous, they eat nectar and fruits of various kinds. The silvereye can be a problem in Australian vineyards, by piercing the grape allowing infection or insect damage to follow.

== Systematics ==
The family Zosteropidae was introduced (as a subfamily Zosteropinae) in 1853 by the French naturalist Charles Lucien Bonaparte. The white-eyes were long considered a distinct family Zosteropidae because they are rather homogeneous in morphology and ecology, leading to little adaptive radiation and divergence.

The genus Apalopteron, formerly placed in the Meliphagidae, was transferred to the white eyes in 1995 on genetic and behavioral evidence. It differs much in appearance from the typical white-eyes, Zosterops, but is approached by some Micronesian taxa; its color pattern is fairly unusual save the imperfect white eye-ring.

In 2003, Alice Cibois published the results of her study of mtDNA cytochrome b and 12S/16S rRNA sequence data. According to her results, the white-eyes were likely to form a clade also containing the yuhinas, which were until then placed with the Old World babblers, a large "wastebin" family. Previous molecular studies (e.g. Sibley & Ahlquist 1990, Barker et al. 2002) had together with the morphological evidence tentatively placed white-eyes as the Timaliidae's closest relatives already. But some questions remained, mainly because the white-eyes are all very similar birds in habitus and habits, while the Old World babblers are very diverse (because, as we now know, the group as formerly defined was polyphyletic).

Combined with the yuhinas (and possibly other Timaliidae), the limits of the white-eye clade to the "true" Old World babblers becomes indistinct. Therefore, the current (early 2007) opinion weighs towards merging the group into the Timaliidae, perhaps as a subfamily ("Zosteropinae"). Few white-eyes have been thoroughly studied with the new results in mind, however, and almost all of these are from Zosterops which even at this point appears over-lumped. Also, many "Old World babblers" remain in unresolved relationships. Whether there can be a clear delimitation of a white-eye subfamily or even a young or emerging family is a question that requires a more comprehensive study of both this group and Timaliidae to resolve (Jønsson & Fjeldså 2006).

For example, a revision of the yuhinas and the genus Stachyris (Cibois et al. 2002), based on the same genes as Cibois (2003), revealed that the Philippine species placed in the latter genus by some were actually yuhinas. However, when the review by Jønsson & Fjeldså (2006) was published, no study had tried to propose a phylogeny for the newly defined yuhinas including the white eyes. Therefore, Jønsson & Fjeldså (2006) give a rather misleading phylogeny for the group. It appears as if the yuhinas are polyphyletic, with the white-collared yuhina being closer to the ancestor of the Zosterops white-eyes than to other yuhinas including the species moved from Stachyris (Cibois et al. 2002).

In the past, the Madanga (Madanga ruficollis) was included in this family but studies now place it as an atypical member of the Motacillidae.

The cladogram below showing the relationships between families is based on a study of babblers by Tianlong Cai and collaborators published in 2019.

- - - Pycnonotidae – bulbuls (161 species)
    - - - Sylviidae – sylviid warblers (32 species)
        - Paradoxornithidae – parrotbills and myzornis (38 species)
      - - Zosteropidae – white-eyes (147 species)
        - - Timaliidae – tree babblers (58 species)
          - - Pellorneidae – ground babblers (65 species)
            - Leiothrichidae – laughingthrushes and allies (143 species)

The cladogram below showing the relationships between the genera is based on the study by Carl Oliveros and collaborators that was published in 2021. The genera Apalopteron, Tephrozosterops and Rukia were not sampled in this study. The genus Megazosterops was found to be nested in Heleia. The earlier study by Cai and collaborators found a generally similar phylogeny but with Cleptornis as sister to Heleia. Cai's study found that Apalopteron was nested within Heleia with weak support and that Tephrozosterops was sister to Zosterops.

- Zosteropidae
  - Parayuhina – white-collared yuhina
  - - Staphida – yuhinas (3 species)
    - - Yuhina – yuhinas (7 species)
      - - - Cleptornis – golden white-eye
          - - Dasycrotapha – babblers (3 species)
            - Sterrhoptilus – babblers (4 species)
        - - Zosterornis – babblers (5 species)
          - - Heleia and Megazosterops – white-eyes (11 species altogether)
            - Zosterops – white-eyes, speirops and the silvereye (110 species)

== List of genera ==
The family contains 149 species divided into 13 genera:

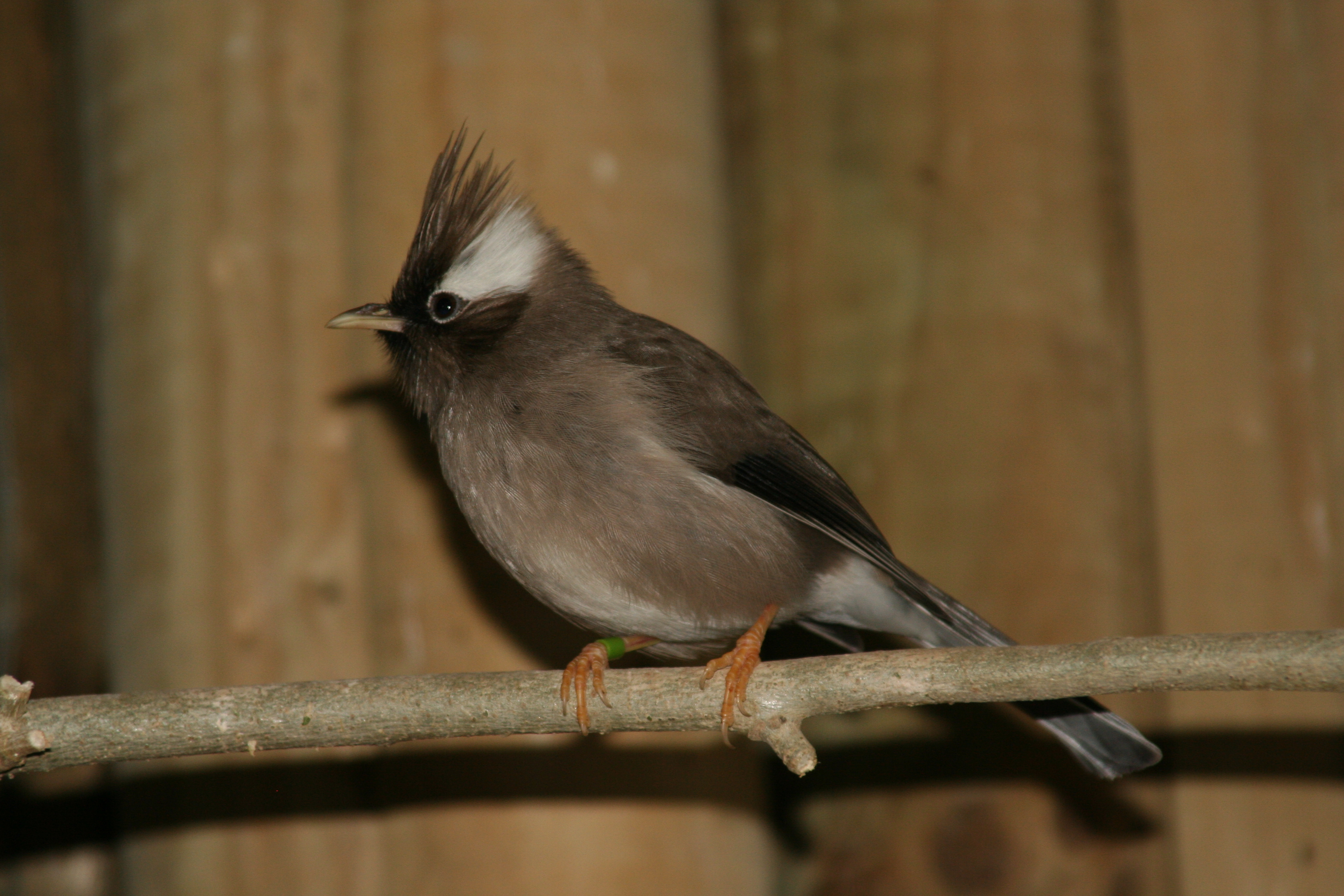
White-collared yuhina (Parayuhina diademata), a close relative of the white-eyes

- Parayuhina – white-collared yuhina
- Staphida – (3 species)
- Yuhina – yuhinas (7 species)
- Dasycrotapha – babbler and pygmy babblers (3 species)
- Sterrhoptilus – babblers (4 species)
- Zosterornis – striped babblers (5 species)
- Cleptornis – golden white-eye
- Rukia – white-eyes (2 species)
- Megazosterops – giant white-eye
- Heleia – heleias (10 species)
- Apalopteron – Bonin white-eye
- Tephrozosterops – rufescent darkeye
- Zosterops – (110 species including 3 recently extinct)

== Sources ==
- van Balen, S. (2008). "Family Zosteropidae (White-eyes)". In del Hoyo, J.; Elliott, A.; Christie, D.A. (eds.). Handbook of the Birds of the World. Vol. 13: Penduline-tits to Shrikes. Barcelona, Spain: Lynx Edicions. pp. 402–485. ISBN 978-84-96553-45-3.
