= Thomas Laycock =

English soldier, explorer, and businessman (1786–1823)

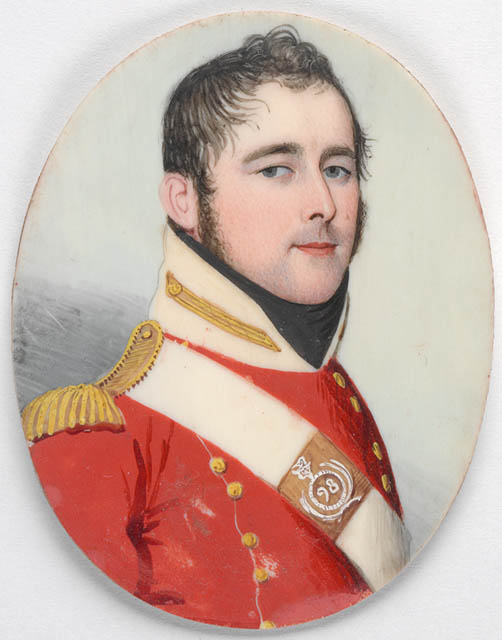
- Thomas Laycock, in the uniform of the 98th Regiment in 1811.
- Born: 1786
- Died: 7 November 1823 (aged 37); Bringelly, New South Wales
- Military career
- Allegiance: British Empire
- Branch: British Army; New South Wales Corps & 98th Regiment of Foot
- Service years: 1795 – 1817
- Rank: Captain
- Conflicts: War of 1812
- Other work: Storekeeper & Hotelier

Thomas Laycock (1786 – 7 November 1823) was an English soldier, explorer, and later businessman, who served in North America during the War of 1812, but is most famous for being the first European to travel overland through the interior of Tasmania (then known as Van Diemen's Land).

== Early life ==
Thomas Laycock was the son of Thomas (1756–1809) and Hannah Laycock (née Pearson, 1758–1831). Whilst the details of his birth are unknown, it is known that he was baptised in London, and arrived in Sydney as a nine-year-old with his mother on 21 September 1791 aboard HMS Gorgon, as part of the Third Fleet. His father, Thomas, had been a quartermaster in the New South Wales Corps, who had also arrived in Sydney aboard HMS Gorgon.

He soon entered service with the New South Wales Corps, and had been commissioned as ensign on 30 December 1795. A natural soldier, he rose to lieutenant by 1802. After service in both Sydney and Norfolk Island, Laycock was sent to Port Dalrymple, Van Diemen's Land to serve under Captain Anthony Fenn Kemp in 1806.

== Van Diemen's Land ==
Arriving in Van Diemen's Land in 1806, Laycock found the northern settlement of Port Dalrymple to be stricken with famine. He was immediately entrusted with a mission to convey dispatches for Lieutenant-Governor David Collins in Hobart Town. No journey into the interior of the island had yet been attempted. Laycock set out on horseback, on 3 February 1807 with four other men from the New South Wales Corps, carrying three weeks provisions each.

They followed the course of the Tamar River south towards the mountains visible in the distance. Climbing into the Central Highlands, the party soon discovered the Lakes district there. They found the going tough over the rugged alpine terrain, but once they had hit the flat ridge line, the party was able to observe much kinder terrain in the distance off to the east. Descending the southern slopes of the Central Highlands, the party came upon the Clyde River, which they named "Fat Doe River", and camped at a location that was later to become the township of Bothwell. The terrain around this region was much more amenable to travel, and Laycock noted the location for his return journey.

They had managed to traverse the islands in just over eight days, arriving on 11 February. They arrived in Hobart Town and issued Collins with the dispatches, but were regrettably told, the situation in Hobart Town was no better than at Port Dalrymple, and no supplies could be spared for the northern colony.

Exhausted from the southward journey, Laycock's party rested in Hobart Town for four days, before commencing their return journey. Following a more easterly route on their northward journey, the party found the going much easier, riding up through the Midlands that was to become the major pastures and farmland of the colony in the following decade. The route that they followed quickly became the 'Hobart Road', the main route between Port Dalrymple (soon after renamed Launceston, Tasmania) and Hobart Town. With minor variations, the route is also closely followed by the modern Midland Highway which is the major north–south artery of Tasmania, and forms part of the national highway number 1.

Despite the famine, Laycock was rewarded for important his discovery by being given a cow, which of course was highly valuable given the short supply of food. He returned to Sydney in January 1808.

== Rum Rebellion ==
Upon his return to Sydney, Laycock discovered that the Rum Rebellion was in full-swing, and the New South Wales Corps, under the leadership of Major George Johnston, and former soldier turned pastoralist John Macarthur had enacted a military coup and had arrested Governor William Bligh. Laycock was appointed to the criminal court that tried Macarthur for his involvement in the plot, and in so doing, he became the only physical casualty of the bloodless rebellion, when he was sent to search Government House for evidence, and fell through a manhole. As a reward for his duties and his discoveries in Van Diemen's Land, Laycock was granted 500 acres (2.0 km^{2}) of land in the Cabramatta region of southwestern Sydney, but like all officers involved in the Rum Rebellion, he had this land confiscated upon the appointment of the next Governor, Lachlan Macquarie.

On 1 June 1809 he married Isabella Bunker, daughter of Eber Bunker. Following Macquarie's arrival, the newly married Laycock departed from New South Wales with wife Isabella, aboard HMS Dromedary on 18 March 1810, sailing for England.

== War of 1812 ==
The New South Wales Corps were disbanded in disgrace following their part in the rebellion, and most of the men transferred into a newly formed 102nd Regiment of foot, and were recalled to England. Laycock also returned to England for the first time since he was a boy, but rejoined with the 98th Regiment of foot. By September 1811 he had been promoted to captain.

The following year, war with the United States broke out in North America, and the 98th foot were dispatched to fight there. For the majority of the war, Laycock's regiment were stationed in Bermuda and New Brunswick, although companies did also garrison parts of the Atlantic coast from 1814 to 1818. Little is known about Laycock's experiences in the war, but he returned to England, selling off his commission upon his return.

== Later life and death ==
Thomas Laycock and wife Isabella sailed immediately for Sydney aboard Fame with their two children, leaving on 8 March 1817, but Isabella took ill during the journey, and died on 12 May 1817. With two young children to look after, Laycock quickly remarried his second wife, Margaret (née Connell) at St. Philips on 8 July 1817, with whom he had a further two children.

Using the money he had saved from his service and sale of commission, he set up a general store and hotel, and quickly became one of the biggest suppliers of meat to the commissariat store. By 1819 he had become involved in local affairs, and was one of the leading citizens is a public call for the right to trial by jury.

Years of life in the military took their toll upon Thomas Laycock, and at the age of 37 he died at home on his estate on 7 November 1823.
