= 98th Regiment of Foot (disambiguation) =

Six regiments of the British Army have been numbered the 98th Regiment of Foot:

- 98th Regiment of Foot (1761), raised in 1761
- 98th Regiment of Foot (1780), raised in 1780 and disbanded in 1787
- 98th (Argyllshire Highlanders) Regiment of Foot, raised in 1794 and renumbered as the 91st in 1796
- 98th Regiment of Foot (1804), raised in 1804 and renumbered as the 97th in 1816
- 98th Regiment of Foot (Prince of Wales's Tipperary Regiment), raised as the 99th in 1804 and renumbered as the 98th in 1816
- 98th (Prince of Wales's) Regiment of Foot, raised in 1824
