= Flagstaff Hill, Tasmania =

Mountain in Tasmania, Australia

Flagstaff Hill

Highest point
- Elevation: 435 m (1,427 ft)
- Prominence: 80 m (260 ft)
- Coordinates: 42.83°S 147.386°E

Geography
- Location: Tasmania, Australia
- Parent range: Meehan Range

Geology
- Mountain type: Jurassic
- Rock type: Dolerite

Climbing
- Easiest route: Bushwalk

Flagstaff Hill is the highest peak within the Meehan Range in southeastern Tasmania, Australia, situated on the eastern shore of the island's capital, Hobart. It rises to an elevation of 435 metres (1,427 ft) above sea level. Despite its name, "Flagstaff Hill" is a misnomer, as a mountain is typically defined as a landform that rises at least 300 m (980 ft) above the surrounding terrain.

With a prominence of 80 metres (262 ft) and a central location within the Meehan Range Nature Recreation Area, Flagstaff Hill serves as a prominent landmark on Hobart's eastern shore.

== History ==
The name "Flagstaff Hill" is thought to derive from its historical use as a signalling or lookout point, leveraging its elevated position overlooking the River Derwent. During the mid-20th century, areas surrounding the hill were used for military training and operations.

Flagstaff Hill and the Meehan Range were heavily affected by bushfire in 2006. The fire, driven by strong winds and dry conditions, threatened nearby suburbs, including Flagstaff Gully, Lindisfarne, and Geilston Bay. Over 40 firefighting crews were deployed, and a change in wind direction helped protect residential areas. The fire caused significant environmental damage, burning through bushland and impacting wildlife within the range.

== Geography ==
Flagstaff Hill is located northeast of Hobart in the City of Clarence, approximately 10 kilometres (6.2 mi) from the city centre. The hill is surrounded by bushland within the Meehan Range Nature Recreation Area, a protected reserve managed by the Tasmania Parks and Wildlife Service. The range runs parallel to the eastern shore of the River Derwent, and Flagstaff Hill provides a vantage point with views of the river, Hobart, and surrounding valleys.

Flagstaff Hill is part of a network of ridges and peaks within the Meehan Range, including nearby landmarks such as Mount Direction and Gunners Quoin.

== Geology ==
Flagstaff Hill is composed of Jurassic dolerite, a dense, coarse-grained igneous rock that formed approximately 165 million years ago during a period of volcanic and tectonic activity. The dolerite intrusions that define the hill were shaped by erosion and weathering over millions of years, resulting in the hill's rounded profile. The geology of Flagstaff Hill is consistent with that of the Meehan Range, which features a mix of dolerite cliffs, sedimentary layers, and occasional basalt outcrops.

== Environment ==
Flagstaff Hill supports a variety of flora and fauna, with its bushland habitat playing an important role in the Meehan Range's ecosystem. Eucalyptus forests and heathlands dominate the vegetation, providing habitat for marsupials, reptiles, and bird species. The broader Meehan Range is part of the South-east Tasmania Important Bird Area, recognised for its conservation value to woodland birds, including the swift parrot and forty-spotted pardalote.

== Recreation ==
Flagstaff Hill is part of the Meehan Range Nature Recreation Area, which provides opportunities for outdoor activities. The reserve includes walking trails that lead to the summit and other parts of the range. These trails are used for recreational purposes such as bushwalking, birdwatching, and nature observation.

The hill is also a key feature of the Clarence Mountain Bike Park, located within the range. This facility includes a network of trails catering to various skill levels, with routes designed for beginner, intermediate, and advanced riders. Notable trails include the Jack Jumper Jumps Trail, an advanced track featuring technical jumps and features.

== Access ==
Flagstaff Hill is accessible via several main roads and walking trails leading to the summit. The primary vehicular access routes are the Tasman Highway (A3) and the East Derwent Highway (B32), with turn-offs onto local roads such as Flagstaff Gully Road, which provide access to the lower slopes of Flagstaff Hill.

== See also ==
- Mount Direction
- Gunners Quoin
