= East Risdon State Reserve =

Protected area in Tasmania, Australia

- IUCN category II (national park)
- Location within Tasmania
- Location: Tasmania
- Nearest city: Geilston Bay
- Coordinates: 42°49′35.6″S 147°19′47.1″E
- Area: 0.8788 km^{2} (0.3393 sq mi)
- Established: 17 March 1971
- Governing body: Tasmania Parks and Wildlife Service

East Risdon State Reserve is an IUCN Category II protected area on the eastern shore of the River Derwent in Clarence City, Hobart, Tasmania. It takes its name from the nearby suburb of Risdon.

The earliest registration as a protected area was 17 March 1971, and is currently managed by Tasmania Parks and Wildlife Service.

The rare flowering plant Eucalyptus risdonii is endemic to the area, and the endangered Eucalyptus morrisbyi has the smaller of its two remaining native stands within the reserve. Also found in surveys of the reserve have been black peppermint, prickly moses, silver wattle, blackwood, native daphne (var. obcordata), dolly bush, common heath, golden pea, spreading wattle, grass, manna gum or white gum, and blue gum.

It encompasses Shag Bay and the northern half of Bedlam Walls. It is a site of note to Aboriginal Tasmanians.
