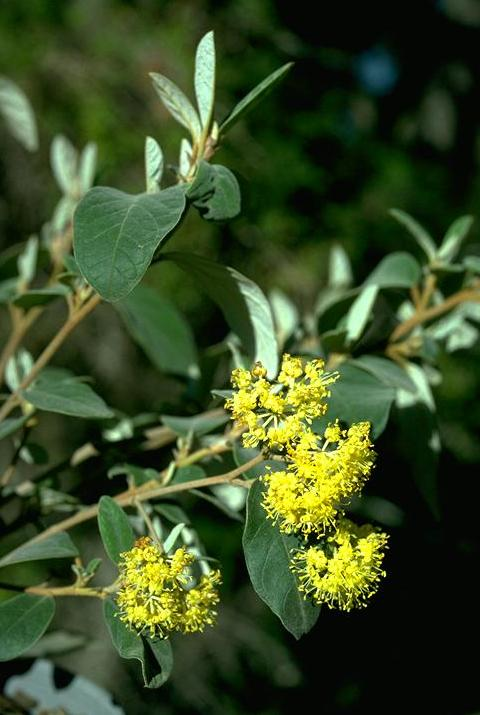
- In the Australian National Botanic Gardens

Scientific classification
- Kingdom: Plantae
- Clade: Tracheophytes
- Clade: Angiosperms
- Clade: Eudicots
- Clade: Rosids
- Order: Rosales
- Family: Rhamnaceae
- Genus: Pomaderris
- Species: P. pilifera

Binomial name
- Pomaderris pilifera N.A.Wakef.

= Pomaderris pilifera =

Species of plant

Pomaderris pilifera is a species of flowering plant in the family Rhamnaceae and is endemic to south-eastern Australia. It is a shrub with hairy branchlets, egg-shaped leaves, and large panicles of lemon-yellow flowers.

== Description ==
Pomaderris pilifera is a shrub that typically grows to a height of up to 3 m (9.8 ft), its stems densely covered with grey, star-shaped hairs. The leaves are egg-shaped, sometimes with the narrower end towards the base, 20–40 mm (0.79–1.57 in) long and 15–30 mm (0.59–1.18 in) wide with more or less wavy edges. The upper surface of the leaves is more or less glabrous, the lower surface densely covered with soft, star-shaped hairs. The flowers are lemon-yellow and borne in pyramid-shaped panicles up to 100 mm (3.9 in) long, each flower on a pedicel 20–40 mm (0.79–1.57 in) long. The petal-like sepals are 1.5–3.0 mm (0.059–0.118 in) long but soon fall off, and the petals are spatula-shaped to heart-shaped, 1.5–2.0 mm (0.059–0.079 in) long. Flowering occurs in September and October and the fruit is a hairy capsule.

== Taxonomy ==
Pomaderris pilifera was first formally described in 1951 by Norman Arthur Wakefield in The Victorian Naturalist from specimens he collected near the Snowy River Victoria in 1947. The specific epithet (pilifera) means "bearing hairs".

In 2007, Alan Maurice Gray and Mark Wapstra described two subspecies of P. pilifera in the journal Muelleria, and the names are accepted by the Australian Plant Census:

- Pomaderris pilifera N.A.Wakef. subsp. pilifera;
- Pomaderris pilifera subsp. talpicutica A.M.Gray & Wapstra that differs from the autonym in having leaves densely covered on the upper surface with dull grey, velvety, star-shaped hairs and a small notch at the tip of the leaves. The epithet talpicutica means "moleskin", referring to the soft layer of hairs on the upper surface of the leaves.

== Distribution and habitat ==
This pomaderris grows in forest and woodland, usually near watercourses and occurs from the south coast of New South Wales to north-east Victoria and on the low hills of the Derwent River estuary. Subspecies talpicutica is only known from three small populations in heathy and shrubby woodlands near East Risdon and Boyer.

== Conservation status ==
Subspecies talpicutica is listed as "vulnerable" under the Australian Government Environment Protection and Biodiversity Conservation Act 1999 and the Tasmanian Government Threatened Species Protection Act 1995. The main threats to the species are forestry operations, inappropriate fire regimes and woody weed invasion.
