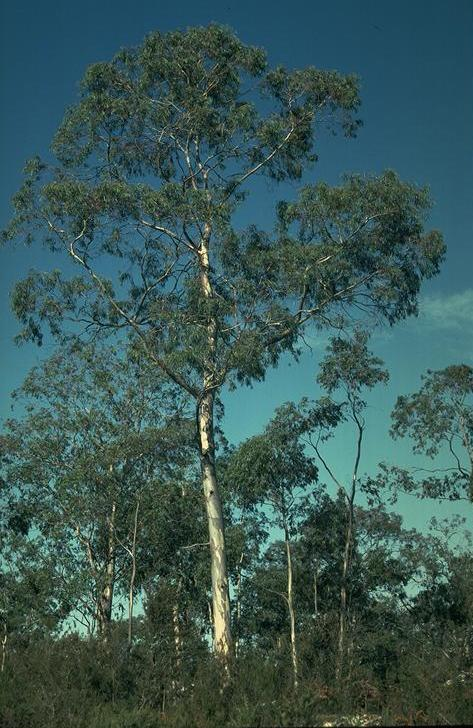

Conservation status
- Near Threatened (IUCN 3.1)

Scientific classification
- Kingdom: Plantae
- Clade: Tracheophytes
- Clade: Angiosperms
- Clade: Eudicots
- Clade: Rosids
- Order: Myrtales
- Family: Myrtaceae
- Genus: Eucalyptus
- Species: E. tenuiramis

Binomial name
- Eucalyptus tenuiramis Miq.

= Eucalyptus tenuiramis =

Silver peppermint

Species of eucalyptus

Eucalyptus tenuiramis, commonly known as the silver peppermint, is a species of small to medium-sized tree that is endemic to southeastern Tasmania. It has smooth bark, broadly lance-shaped adult leaves, flower buds in groups of nine to fifteen, white flowers and cup-shaped, hemispherical or conical fruit.

== Description ==
Eucalyptus tenuiramis is a tree that typically grows to a height of 25 m (82 ft) and forms a lignotuber. It has smooth white to grey or yellowish bark. Young plants and coppice regrowth have sessile, egg-shaped leaves that are 17–60 mm (0.67–2.36 in) long, 10–38 mm (0.39–1.50 in) wide and arranged in opposite pairs. Adult leaves are broadly lance-shaped to elliptical, 55–130 mm (2.2–5.1 in) long and 10–25 mm (0.39–0.98 in) wide, tapering to a petiole 7–12 mm (0.28–0.47 in) long. The flower buds are arranged in leaf axils in groups of nine to fifteen on an unbranched peduncle 4–12 mm (0.16–0.47 in) long, the individual buds on pedicels 1–4 mm (0.039–0.157 in) long. Mature buds are oval to club-shaped, 5–8 mm (0.20–0.31 in) long and 3–4 mm (0.12–0.16 in) wide with a conical or rounded operculum. Flowering occurs from November to February and the flowers are white. The fruit is a woody cup-shaped, hemispherical or conical capsule 5–12 mm (0.20–0.47 in) long and 6–11 mm (0.24–0.43 in) wide with the valves near rim level.

== Taxonomy and naming ==
Eucalyptus tenuiramis was first formally described in 1856 by Friedrich Anton Wilhelm Miquel in the journal Nederlandsch Kruidkundig Archief. The specific epithet (tenuiramis) is from the Latin tenui- meaning "slender" or "thin" and ramus meaning "branch".

This eucalypt is reported as being an older form of its sister species, E. risdonii.

== Distribution and habitat ==
Silver peppermint grows in open forest, often in pure stands, on lowlands and hills in south-eastern Tasmania especially in the Derwent River valley, but also on the Freycinet Peninsula and on Flinders Island.

== Conservation status ==
The IUCN Red List assesses the species as Near Threatened.
