= Geilston Bay fossil site =

Paleontological site in Australia

Coordinates: 42°50′18″S 147°20′47″E

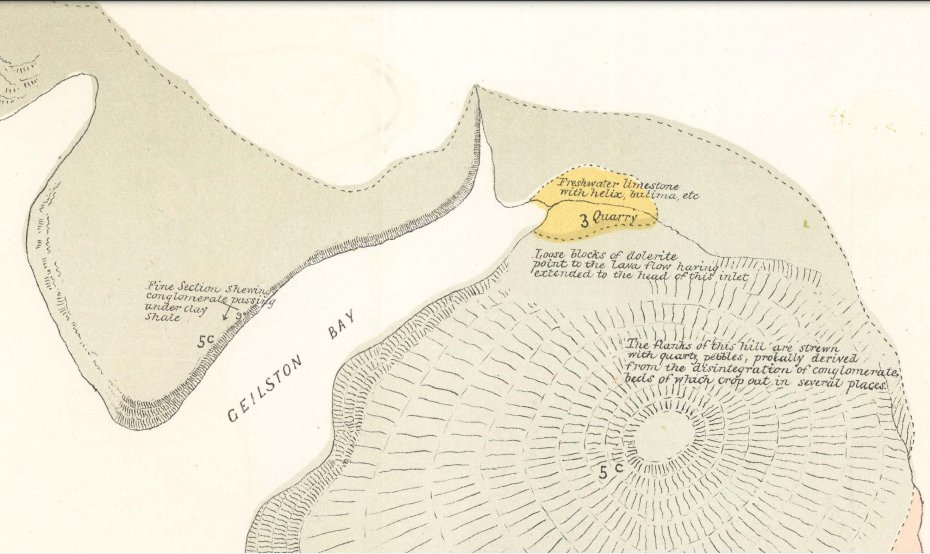
Detail of Geilston Bay, from Krausè, 1884 "New Town plus surrounds" map, with location of "freshwater limestone" plus the associated quarry indicated

The Geilston Bay fossil site is a paleontological site of Late Oligocene (or possibly Early Miocene) age in south-eastern Tasmania, Australia. It lies within the suburb of Geilston Bay which, although it is a part of the municipality (city) of Clarence, is effectively a suburb of Hobart located on the eastern shore of the River Derwent. The Geilston Bay site is important as one of the few of its age to yield fossils of mammals from the Late Paleogene Period (earliest Tertiary); at the time of their redescription in 1975, the mammal (marsupial) fossils were considered the earliest then known from Australia, although that distinction has since been surrendered to fossils from the Murgon fossil site in south-east Queensland, whose fauna—known as the Tingamarra Fauna—is of Early Eocene age. In addition to the somewhat fragmentary mammal bones still in existence, a range of plant macrofossils have also been described from the site, which appear not to have survived. The limestone deposit (in a form known as travertine) in which the fossils occurred was extensively mined (possibly completely) for the production of lime in the nineteenth and early twentieth centuries, and its location, while still publicly accessible, now lies buried beneath landfill under the playing fields of the former Geilston Bay High School.

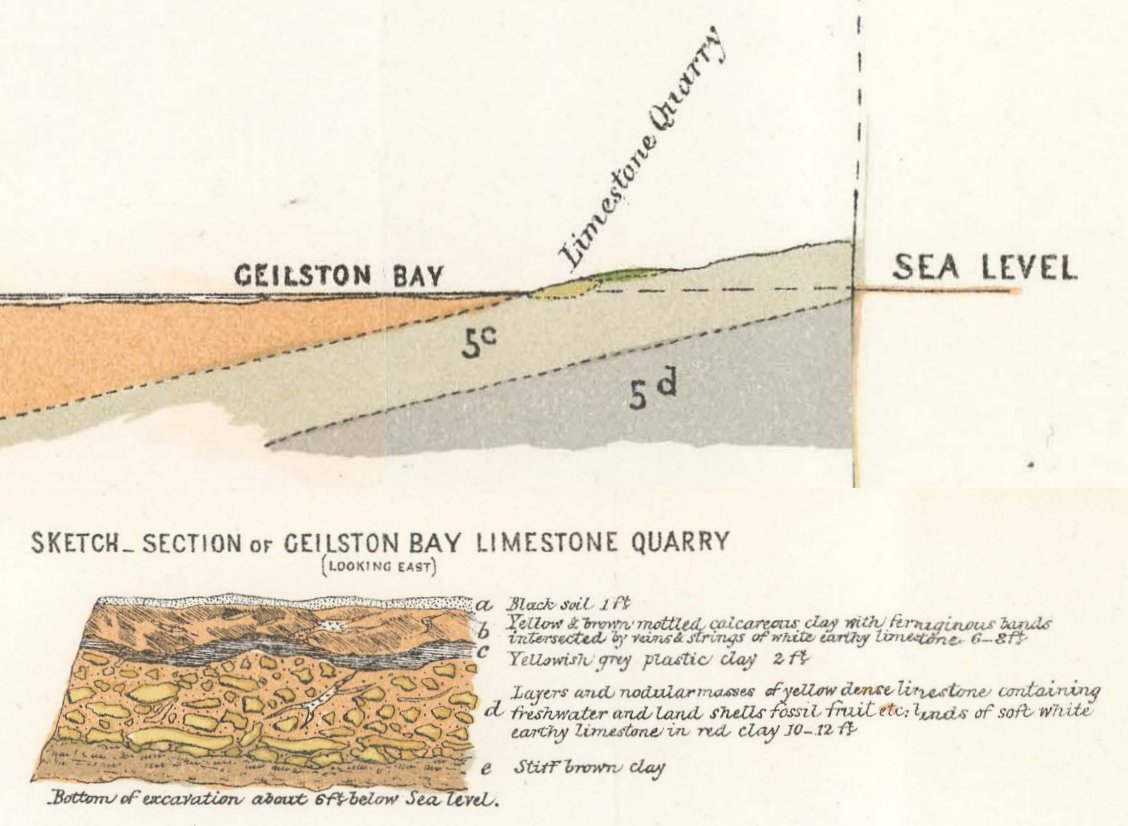
Details of Geilston Bay quarry from "Geological Sketch Map of Country around New Town" [Tasmania] accompanying Krausè, 1884 published report

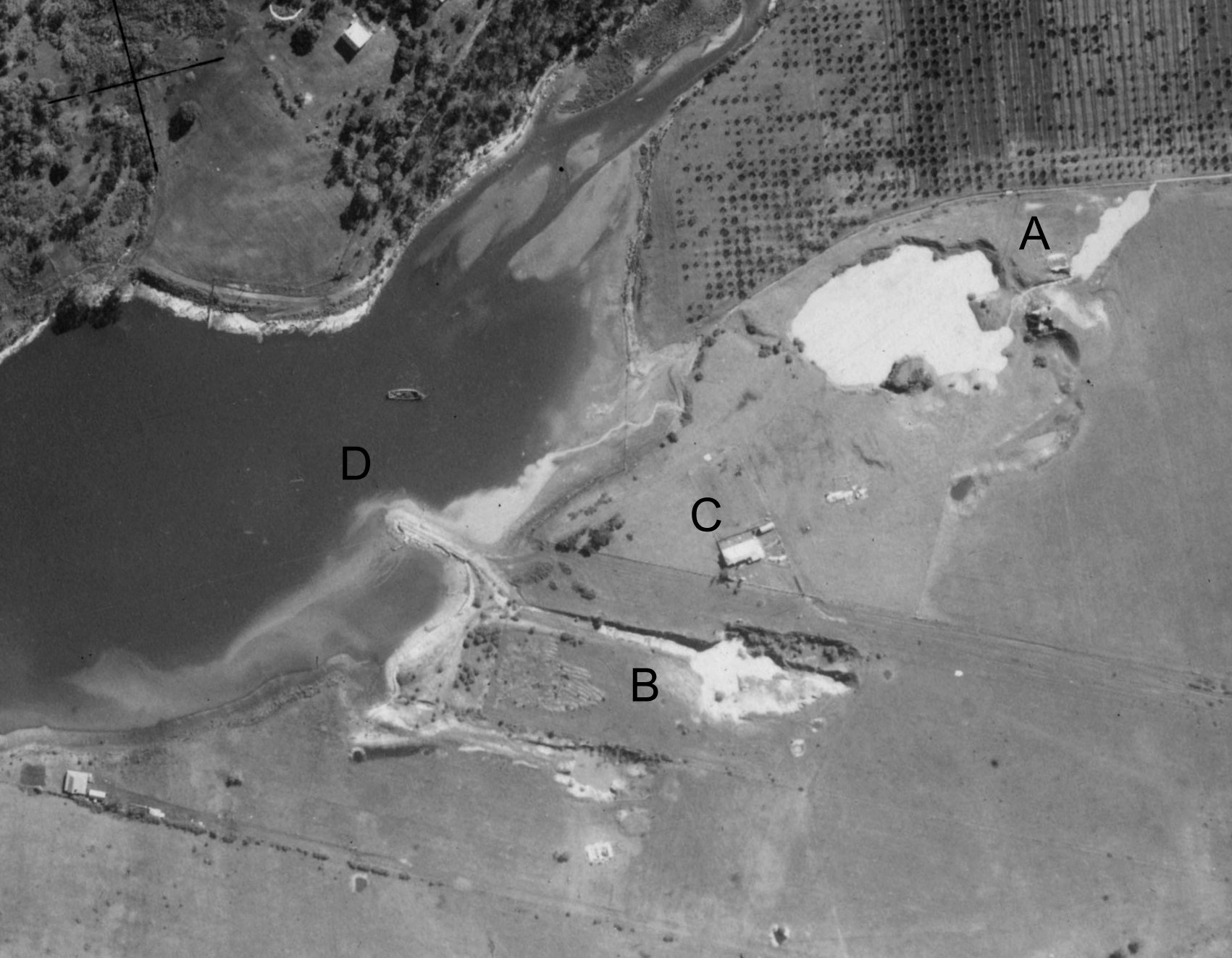
Geilston Bay, Tasmania, aerial photograph 26 Mar 1946 (detail). Annotations (A-D) added by Tony Rees in January 2023: A & B: sites of former quarrying activities still visible in 1946; C: building, no longer extant; D: jetty from where lime and later, limestone was dispatched by boat

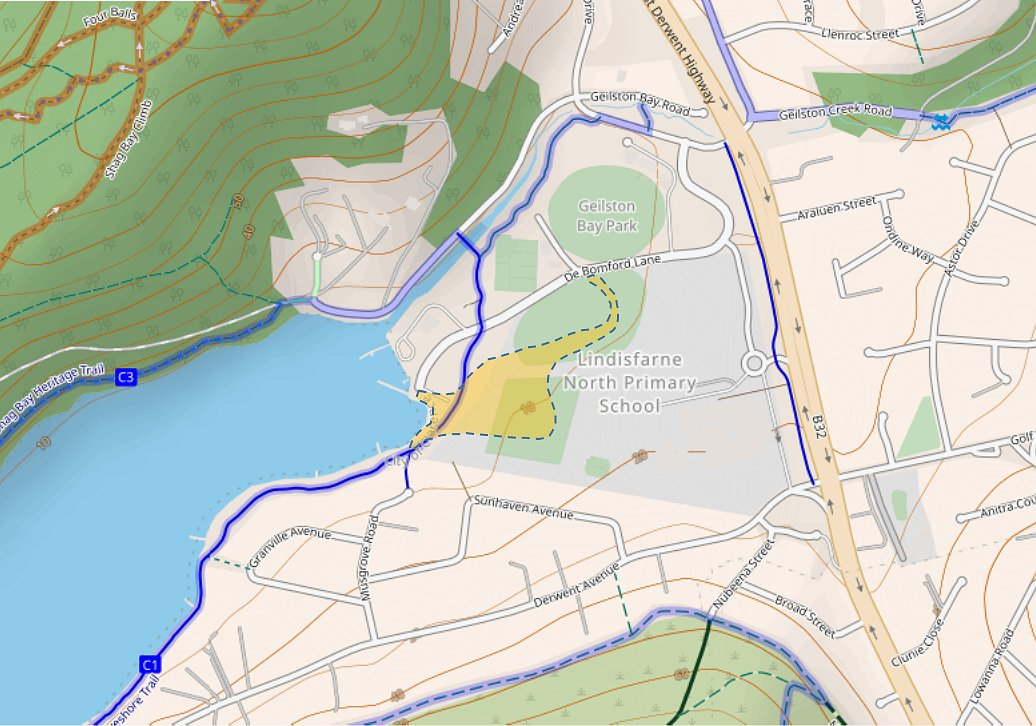
Geilston Bay, Tasmania: location of Travertine deposit (shown in gold, redrawn from 1964 geological map) overlaid on 2022 street map

== Geological setting ==
The Geilston Travertine (also referred to as the Risdon Travertine in older literature, also spelled "Travertin" on occasion), is a freshwater limestone deposit that (according to Tedford and Kemp) "fill[s] the narrow end of a valley excavated along a fault displacing Permian sediments. More than 10 m of sediments, passing below sea level, are [or were] preserved in this Tertiary paleovalley. ... [Tertiary] Alkali basalts overlie fossiliferous sediments at Geilston Bay, Lindisfarne Bay, and at Selfs Point north Cornelian Bay. They pass below sea level beneath the Tasman Bridge and extend along the floor of the Derwent estuary. ... In the case of the Geilston Bay outcrops, travertine deposition continued after emplacement of the lava. ... The basalt overlying the Geilston Travertine (Tedford et al., 1975, see data) yielded 22.4 ± 0.5 Ma, which can be corrected following Dalrymple (1979) to 23.0 ± 0.5 Ma." The general scientific consensus is that the travertine was deposited as calcium-rich water emanating from a fossil spring which subsequently dried out and solidified, on occasion incorporating portions of the surrounding biota that fell into it, before the water could flow away. Since the corrected date (between 22.5 and 23.5 Ma) for the overlying basalt exactly straddles the Oligocene-Miocene boundary, accounts such as that of Tedford and Kemp refer to the deposit as [late] Oligocene, while other workers (particularly those who have published on the Riversleigh fauna, the earliest portion of which is also considered to be late Oligocene), refer to the Geilston Bay deposit as early Miocene. However, as Tedford and Kemp point out, the Oligocene-Miocene boundary date is for the overlying basalt, not the travertine, which therefore is most likely to be Late Oligocene in age. Johnston (1888, page 284) groups the Geilston Bay deposit with other Tertiary deposits in the Derwent Basin considered to be of similar age, notably deposits at Cornelian Bay, Sandy Bay, and One Tree Point (now Blinking Billy Point), and notes their similar flora and, possibly, fauna.

== Contemporary descriptions ==
Since the deposit is no longer extant, it is worth noting in some detail contemporary (plus some later) descriptions of it, ranging in date from the nineteenth to (approximately) mid twentieth centuries.

Some nineteenth century commentators believed that the deposit had been described by Charles Darwin during his visit to Hobart and surrounds in 1836 as "a solitary and superficial patch of yellowish limestone or travertine, which contains numerous impressions of leaves of trees, together with land-shells, not now existing", however subsequent, more detailed descriptions that he gave of the site, lead modern commentators to infer that Darwin was in fact describing a separate, hillside outcrop in Hobart itself (in Burnett Street), no longer in existence.

The earliest documented visit that is currently known to researchers is a note by Robert McCormick, surgeon on H.M.S. Erebus (Note: A detailed account by Philip Stone of McCormick's collecting activities in the Southern Ocean is available here, but does not extend to his activities during the stopover(s) in Hobart Town on the outbound and return legs of the Ross expedition.) published in 1847, who visited the site during a visit of the Erebus (with its sister ship, "Terror") to Hobart in 1841 (along with a different travertine quarry, the one in Hobart Town) and noted the remains of "Dicotyledonous plants of an extinct flora" plus "a helix and bulimus" (land shells), the latter in the Geilston deposit only. Of the Geilston deposit he wrote: "The limestone is of the same yellowish colour [as that in the Hobart Town deposit], but more indurated in texture, and has been quarried to the depth of seventy or eighty feet. The shells are found in the upper layer, and both leaves and stems in the lower portion." We do not have a date that the quarry was started, but from this account it seems likely that it was already some years earlier; Hughes, 1957 gave a date of 1836 for the quarry opening, but no source is given, and his remark may simply be based on the subsequently discounted, supposed Darwin visit of that year; however there is an 1838 letter (quoted in Ward, 2021) which mentions a John Price (a tenant of the owner) "cultivating the land and burning lime for which he has an easy market in Hobart Town".

According to an account by von Ettingshausen (1883), McCormick collected plant material from both sites which was subsequently deposited (under the label "Erebus and Terror") in the British Museum in London and was later seen by von Ettingshausen there, refer next section for further details.

J.B. Jukes (inferred as the author, see note) referred in an 1843 newspaper article to "Mr. Price's limestone quarry in James's Bay" (James's Bay being an old name for Geilston Bay), lying "horizontally in a small valley". (Note: The likely attribution to J.B. Jukes arises from that author's identical phrases in an 1846 article in The Tasmanian journal of natural science, agriculture, statistics, &c. Vol.2: 1-12, 1846 with a very similar title, namely "A few Remarks on the Nomenclature and Classification of Rock Formations in New Countries".) Jukes mentions the quarry again in an 1847 paper, stating that the travertinous limestone at "James's Bay" "rests ... nearly horizontally, and is but little elevated above the level of the sea."

M. Allport gives an account of the fauna and flora of the quarry in 1866, which he reports as having visited "for twelve years past" (in other words, since 1854 or thereabouts); the (newly opened) bed in which the fossil mammals occurred is stated as being at "a depth of thirty feet from the surface soil". Allport's account is reproduced in more detail in the section below.

"S.H.W." (identifiable via a later 1884 account as S.H. Wintle) gives an account of the quarry in 1868, reporting that it had a maximum depth of almost 100 feet. He wrote:

On the east bank of the Derwent, at Lindisfarne, there is an inlet named Geilston Bay. At a distance of two or three hundred yards from the water's edge a quarry has been opened in some beds of travertin, which have been worked for a period extending over thirty years. From time to time some very beautiful fossils have been brought to light. There are three distinct beds of travertin, which are separated by strata of loam, sandy gravel, and stiff brown clay. ... The fossils obtained in this quarry are principally the shells of land snails (Bulimus and Helix), with some supposed to be fresh water (Planorbis and Lymnæus), the stems and leaves of plants, and the bones of animals. With regard to the latter, I have in my collection some bones which I dug out at a depth of eighty feet, or thereabouts, from the surface, and beneath two compact beds of travertin, each having a mean thickness of eight feet.

In 1884, F.W. Krausè included the Geilston deposit three times in his maps and cross sections of the "geology of the area around New Town", the latter now a northern suburb of Hobart. He depicts the Geilston deposit as forming a low rise above sea level, and included a cross section drawn from inside the quarry, (both drawings reproduced here) from which it may be seen that the cross section shown would be between about 19 and 23 feet, with the bottom of the excavation (including perhaps a further 2 feet of "stiff brown clay") given as about six feet below sea level.

There also exists an unattributed 1902 newspaper article entitled "Tasmanian Lime Industry" from 1902, in which the quarry is most likely the one wherein "Messrs Wilson Bros ... turn out a brown lime on the other side of the river at Risdon. This brown limestone runs beneath the river level, and in years past it has been found necessary to erect pumps to reduce the water in the quarries."

Nye, 1924, wrote that by that time, "several quarries have been opened up" on the site, and noted that "The limestone occurs as irregular beds up to 5 feet in thickness, and is very dense and homogeneous. Remains of numerous fossil plants, fruits, and wood, as well as fresh-water shells, have been obtained from these quarries."

Later Hughes, 1957 noted that "In the quarry, being worked in 1924, were several beds of limestone, varying in thickness up to six feet, inter-bedded with sandstone and mudstone and overlain by 10 feet of basalt. At that time the stone was used by the Electrolytic Zinc Company and earlier the lime had been burnt in a kiln on the spot. Today, all that can be seen is a large pit with water in it and the remains of the old kiln.

Possibly the last account of the former quarry plus its associated deposit was given by W.R. Moore in 1965 who wrote: "The only definite Tertiary sedimentary deposit that outcrops in the Risdon Vale area is the limestone at the head of Geilston Bay. This fossiliferous limestone has been worked intermittantly [sic] since before 1836 ... The deposit is practically worked out and the pits have been flooded so that it is difficult to gain an idea of its original extent and appearance or the stratigraphic relationship between the limestone and the associated basalt."

From the above, all that can definitely be said is that the quarry had most likely been in existence for some years prior to the first documented visit by McCormick in 1841, and was still in operation, by now as a supply point for limestone for the Electrolytic Zinc Company across the river, in 1924, as well as being definitely defunct by 1946, as evidenced by the aerial photograph included here. The height of the working presents a problem, being stated indirectly or directly as something approaching 23 feet (Krausè account), at least 30 feet (Allport), "seventy or eighty feet" (McCormick), and "almost 100 feet" (Wintle), as well as [the deposit] passing perhaps 6 feet below sea level (or perhaps more?). From this present distance in time, it is hard to envisage an entire hill of up to 100 feet being quarried away without trace, but possibly this is indeed what happened, allowing that some of the deposit may also have extended underground.

The 1946 aerial photograph detail reproduced here seems to be the only photographic evidence extant of the area occupied by the former quarry workings, and appears to show 2 areas of former quarrying activity, the northerly one filled up with water as later stated in the 1965 account by Moore. Since that time, in preparation for the construction of the adjacent Geilston Bay High School in around 1971, the area was levelled for the school playing field and no trace of the palaeontological site is visible at the surface today; whether or not any of the original travertine and/or related strata still exist in a condition untouched by the former quarrying operations is unknown.

== Plant and animal fossils ==
The earliest "formal" published description of the deposit and its fossils, by M. Allport in 1866 under the title "Notice of some fossils recently discovered near Risdon, Tasmania" was brief (just 3 pages) but full of interest. Selected paragraphs from his initial description are as follows:

The Geilstown Travertine is highly fossiliferous, containing many interesting animal and vegetable remains, which afford some clue to its geological age; of these remains those belonging to the vegetable kingdom are by far the most numerous, the impressions of many of the leaves being especially beautiful. ... For twelve years past I have collected specimens from this quarry, and have in that period discovered the impressions of two seed vessels which I am unable to assign to any existing Tasmanian form. ... Impressions of the stems and leaves of some plant closely resembling a species of Leucopogon (a heath-like plant, now common on the hills in the immediate neighborhood of the quarry) are very abundant. Impressions are also numerous of serrated leaves bearing a superficial resemblance to those of the sassafras (Atherosperma Moschata). Others, again, resemble the dogwood (Pomaderris Apetala). Many specimens have occurred of a plant resembling a species of Pimelea, known here by the trivial name of the cotton-tree, from the toughness of its bark.

... Amongst the animal remains collected is one insect, unknown to me, probably the larval form of some waterbeetle, and five species of shells belonging to the genera Helix, Limnea, Planorbis, and Helicarion. Of these the commonest is a large Helix, now extinct in Tasmania, the others are rare and comprise a smaller Helix, probably Helix Sinclari, a Planorbis (unknown to me and possibly extinct), a large Limnea not now found in our fresh waters, and a Helicarion, probably Helicarion Milligani.

... The workmen at the quarry have kept a look out having promised to save anything resembling bones for me, but up to a few weeks back no definite traces of bone were found. Then, however, the specimens now on the table were discovered. The bed in which these bones were found was exposed during the opening of a new part of the quarry, and consist of a deposit of arenaceous clay, containing coarse grit, and a few slightly rounded pebbles, just such as might be carried down any of our small rivulets by a moderate flood.

The particular bed in which the bones were found is at a depth of thirty feet from the surface soil. ... Nearly all the specimens are mutilated, and so tender as to be removed from the matrix only with the greatest care, the most perfect being of course the comparatively hard teeth. They are in great numbers, and clearly belong to many creatures. After a diligent search I have found pieces belonging to almost all parts of the skeleton, from the skull to the tail, and even the ultimate nail-bearing joints of the toes, one or two of these last being in excellent preservation. I have not arrived at any conclusion as to the nature of the one large bone bedded in Travertine. Of the others I believe that many of the teeth found belonged to creatures closely allied to existing marsupials, such as Hypsiprimni and Phalangistae (Kangaroo Cats and Opossums) as I have carefully compared them with specimens of these creatures' teeth from my own cabinet.

Allport goes on to say that he is about to send the animal bones to Professor Owen in London for his opinion on their affinities (refer additional discussion below).

A slightly later account was given by R.M. Johnston ("Johnson" in that publication only) in 1879; Johnston goes on to detail a large number of specimens of fruit, leaves and cones from the Geilston Bay limestone, which he has "referred to Baron von Mueller" for identification and of which the specimens do not seem to have survived, plus several land snails, 2 of which he describes as new (one is named Helix Geilstonensis after the locality).

In 1883, von Ettingshausen published an account of the plant fossil material collected by McCormick in 1841 and later examined at the British Museum. He noted "35 species, which are distributed into 21 genera and 17 families" from the "Hobart Town" deposit, also stating that "I have examined in the British Museum a series of fossil plants from Risdon, Geilston Quarry [which] is one of the best localities for the Travertin containing the leaves." It is not presently known whether any of the latter material still survives.

Also in 1883, Ferdinand von Mueller illustrated a female cone of his newly named species Araucaria johnstonii (noted as being initially described 4 years previously, in Reports of the Mining Surveyors and Registrars, September 1879) as collected by Mr. Johnston from the Geilston travertine, which, however, Cookson & Duigan (1951) commented was probably not an Araucaria (von Mueller himself was hesitant regarding placing it in that genus, noting that "the shortness of the leaves... reminding rather among fossil plants of the foliage of Walchia, Voltzia, Echinostrobus and Palyssya.") According to von Mueller's account, the conifer fossil/s were "very recently found ... by the assiduous and circumspect amateur-geologist of Launceston [i.e., Johnston], who observed this interesting coniferous fossil associated with fruits of the genera Penteune, Plesiocapparis and Platycoila."

O.H. Selling re-studied von Mueller's "Araucaria" material in the late 1940s based the latter's original illustrations together with material in the British Museum (by then in the "British Museum (Natural History)", currently the [U.K.] Natural History Museum). He published his results in a 1950 paper, stating:

During my stay in Australia in 1948–49 I vainly tried to locate von Mueller's type and also visited the Geilston quarry without result. However, I obtained from several collections [i.e., in London] a representative material of his species from the type locality ... While working on the Tasmanian collections in the British Museum in 1947, I came across specimens showing impressions of the kind illustrated in Pl. I, Fig. 1. They have never before been mentioned in literature. Metal casts were made and the rock dissolved with the result shown in Pl. I, Figs. 2-4. They show portions of foliage-shoots that have belonged to an Araucaria, a species of the Eutacta section which finds its closest recent counterpart in Araucaria coluninaris (Forst.) Hook. (A. Cookii R. Bn.) of New Caledonia. Apart from the foliage-shoots, some travertin specimens from the Geilston area contain numerous detached leaves of the same species. Such leaves are incidentally figured as unidentified objects in Mueller 1879, Pl. XVIII, Fig. 2 (repr. in 1883, Pl. XVIII, Fig. 2).

Selling goes on to erect a new species of Arauacaria, A. derwentensis, based on the fossil "foliage-shoots". His type specimen is one in the British Museum (Natural History), no. 46656 (cast), labelled "Hobart Town, Tasmania", and believed by him to have most likely come from the Burnett Street quarry, however a second specimen, no. 46658, is labelled "vicinity of Hobart (Risdon), purch[ase] of E. Gerrard", so this could well be from Geilston Bay.

R.M. Johnston erected a new species of fossil land snail (genus Vitrina) in 1885, based on a specimen from the Geilston Bay quarry; he named his species Vitrina Barnardii (current practice would be to give the species epithet in lowercase) after "our worthy vice-president [of the Royal Society of Tasmania], Mr. Barnard, who, for many long years, has taken a most active interest in all matters relating to the progress of the natural history of this island."

Of particular interest to later researchers was the occurrence in this Tertiary deposit of fossil bones of mammals, a selection of which (as detailed above) had been sent by M. Allport to the British Museum in London for the attention of the great palaeontologist Richard Owen, who determined that they represented "a small kind of Hypsiprymnus, with probably also Perameles and Phalangista." It then seemed to Allport that Owen was suggesting that the bones were in fact of modern animals, and thus of little palaeontological interest, so Allport expended some effort in later publications attempting to explain how they could have ended up washed into a Tertiary deposit. Allport also appears to have lost further interest in collecting any more animal material, which was most likely simply then burned in the kilns along with the limestone. However, later, possibly too late, Allport did change his mind and decide that the fossils may indeed have been Tertiary in age as he initially believed.

R.M. Johnston, in his substantial work "Systematic Account of the Geology of Tasmania" published in 1888, includes a section on the Geilston Bay deposits (pp. 286–288), basically summarising the information then known without giving anything new. A small number of Geilston Bay fossils (shells and plant remains) are included in the accompanying plates, along with, without further comment (on Plate L) illustration of some fragmentary marsupial remains "excavated from beneath a solid sheet of basalt in a cooling joint of an older flow" (no location given, however from the text on p. 281 they would appear to have come from One Tree Point, now Blinking Billy Point, and be of a similar age to the Geilston Bay remains).

Allport's mammal specimens sent to London were thought lost for over one hundred years before being rediscovered in 1973; with their Tertiary age re-established they were then formally announced in a 1975 publication "Recognition of the oldest known fossil marsupials from Australia" by R.H Tedford and others in the prestigious journal Nature, and further, after additional study, in a 1998 paper entitled "Oligocene marsupials of the Geilston Bay Local Fauna, Tasmania". In this latter paper the authors reported that the bones indicated the presence of at least four distinct species of fossil marsupials, being a dasyurid, two petauroid genera and species, plus another large burramyid petauroid "larger than any known living or fossil member of this group"; at the time of the first report, the Geilston Bay material represented the oldest fossil mammals yet known from Australia, although this distinction was subsequently surrendered to deposits at other sites. Subsequently, K. Crosby and others suggested that one of the petauroid taxa identified by Tedford and Kemp was more likely to be a phalangerid.

In their 1998 paper, Tedford & Kemp write:

The Geilston travertine appears to represent a facies of a largely fine-grained, clastic infilling of a predecessor of the River Derwent that flowed southeastward through a rugged terrain, clothed by a rainforest of conifers and angiosperms representing a diverse sample of the mid-Tertiary flora of southern Australia ... The Geilston Bay local fauna contains an array of taxa that differ in composition from those of nearly contemporary sites elsewhere in Australia ... The prevalence of petauroid diprotodontians is of particular interest in affording a view of a group that is not diversely represented in the Oligocene and early Miocene faunas of the mainland.

== See also ==
- Mammals of Australia
- Geology of Australia
- Natural history of Australia
- Marsupial
