= Andrew Geils =

Army officer and British colonial administrator (1773–1843)

3rd Commandant of Van Diemen's Land
- In office 20 February 1812 – 4 February 1813
- Governor: Lachlan Macquarie
- Preceded by: Captain J. Murray
- Succeeded by: Colonel David Collins (as lieutenant governor)

Personal details
- Born: 1773 (?) India (?)
- Died: 11 February 1843 (aged 69–70) Dumbuck, Scotland
- Spouse: Mary Noble
- Children: 8 (+?) sons (Thomas, b. c.1802; William Noble, b. c.1805; Andrew, b. c.1807; Alexander McGregor Murray, b. c.1808; John Edward, unknown, unknown, Andrew Alexander, b. 1820); 3(?) daughters (Hannah, b. c. 1797; Mary, b. c.1798; Isabella, b. c.1821)
- Parent(s): Thomas Geils (father), Mary Pascal (mother)

Colonel Andrew Geils (c. 1773 – 11 February 1843) was a military officer of British (Scottish) heritage, who served as Commandant (acting governor) of Van Diemen's Land (subsequently Tasmania) between 1812 and 1813; prior to that time he served in Madras, India, and subsequently spent 2 years with his regiment in Ceylon. In around 1818, having failed in an aspiration to the Lieutenant-Governorship of Tasmania when the latter was due to became vacant in 1818, he returned to Scotland where in 1815 he had inherited one of his father's properties, Dumbuck Estate in West Dunbartonshire, and where he resided until his death in 1843. The Hobart suburb of Geilston Bay in Tasmania is named after his one time (1812–1832) land holdings in the area.

== Biography ==
=== Early life ===
Geils was "probably" born in India around 1773, (Note: This birth date as given in Lachlan and Elizabeth Macquarie Biographical Register; not traced elsewhere in print sources.) the eldest son of Lieutenant-General Thomas Geils, born Greenock, Scotland, (Note: Thomas Geils' memorial tablet in Cardross Church, Scotland reads: "In memory of Lieut.-General Geils of Ardmore, son of Andrew Geils, Esq., merchant, Greenock, and of Catherine Donald, his wife, daughter of Thomas Donald, Esq., of Geilston; born 20th July, 1747, died at Ardmore 24th October, 1815, after a long and distinguished service in the H.E.I. Company's Artillery, Madras Presidency; and in memory of Mary Pascal, his wife.") who was in command of the Madras artillery of the East India Company. Andrew joined his father's regiment in 1790, passing through several other regiments to attain the rank of major in the 73rd Regiment of Foot by 1808. By 1810 Geils was in England with his wife Mary (née Noble) and, together with their 2 daughters Hannah (b. c.1797 and Mary, b. c.1798) and 4 sons Thomas (b. c.1802), William Noble (b. c.1805), Andrew (b. c.1807) and Alexander McGregor Murray (b. c.1808) set sail for Australia in charge of the guard of a convict transport ship, the "Providence", which arrived in Sydney in July 1811.

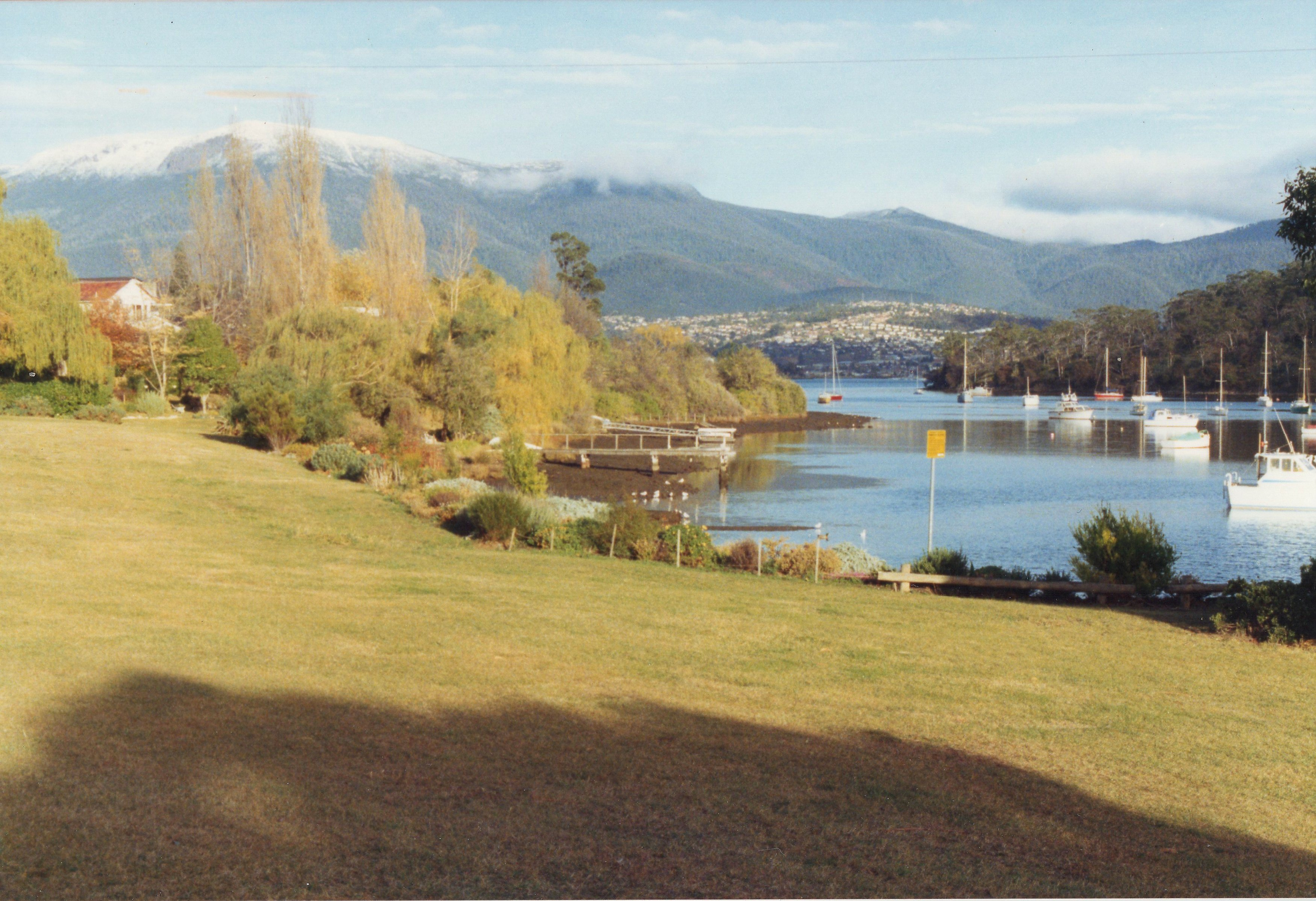
Geilston Bay, Tasmania, Australia in 1994; the name derives from "Geils' Town", a name applied to Geils' nineteenth century property holdings in the area

=== Residency in Van Diemen's Land ===
Initially enjoying the patronage of Australian Governor Lachlan Macquarie, in 1812 he was appointed the third Commandant (acting Governor) of Van Diemen's Land, his predecessors in that role being Lieutenant Edward Lord and Captain J. Murray, his appointment terminating with the appointment of the new Governor Thomas Davey in 1813. Many official exchanges between Geils and Macquarie (mainly responses by the latter to reports and requests by the former, but also including Macquarie's official letter of instruction to Geils) over that interval have been preserved, and can be read via the published "Historical Records of Australia Series III" which deals with "Despatches and Papers Relating to the Settlement of the States" including Tasmania, 1803—June, 1812 (Volume 1) and Tasmania, July, 1812—December, 1819 (Volume 2).

Macquarie, however, was less than impressed with Geils' conduct while in office, reprimanding Geils for "excessive withdrawals from the Police Fund" and later having taken large quantities of spirits, grain, sugar and hardware from the Government store without authorisation, and also using the services of a large number of convicts for his own benefit, again without authorisation, such that Geils' expressed desire for a subsequent lieutenant-governorship was refused.

The compiler of the 1921 Volume 3 part 2 of "Historical Records of Australia" left no doubt as to his and/or history's verdict regarding Geils' time as administrator, writing:

Geils was quite unfit to be an administrator, and Governor Macquarie stated that, "in the exercise of his temporary power, he displayed not only a sordid, mean and covetous disposition, but, in many instances, shewed himself also venal and corrupt." ... Before Governor Macquarie was aware of his misappropriations of government property, Geils had made most preposterous requests. He asked for a grant of three thousand acres with a liberal proportion of cattle from the government herds for his six children; and he sought permission to purchase the government house at Hobart town. Governor Macquarie naturally refused these requests, but he offered Mrs. Geils a grant of twelve hundred acres with twelve cows and four working oxen from the government herds on the usual terms of three years' credit. ... there is little worthy of historical note except the unbridled prevalence of bushranging, and the arrival, on the 9th of October, 1812, of the Indefatigable, the first ship to carry convicts from England to Tasmania. The union of the administrations caused little evident changes, and Geils was too preoccupied with personal aims to be concerned with the administration of the settlements at Port Dalrymple under major G. A. Gordon as commandant. After lieut.-governor Davey assumed the government, Geils sailed from the Derwent in the brig Active on the 14th of January, 1814.

During his brief period of residence in Van Diemen's Land/Tasmania, Geils purchased a number of properties including "Restdown" at Risdon Cove, which he was apparently provisioning for his own occupation, and also, land on the Derwent River 3 miles upstream from Hobart Town which became known as "Geils Town", although during Geils' ownership it appear to have been mainly the site of a farm of the same name; the latter name, morphed into "Geilston", subsequently became used (as "Geilston Bay") for both the inlet itself and the locality (eventually a suburb) that occupied the area.

One other event of significance for the family during this period was the birth of the couple's fifth son, John Edward, born 6th April 1813 and baptised on 13 June at Hobart Town. On account of a tragic accident as detailed below, John Edward was to be the eldest surviving son at the time of Andrew's death in 1843, and would thus inherit his father's subsequent estate in Scotland.

A set of papers relating to Geils' activities whilst in Tasmania and afterwards are preserved in Hobart as part of the (mostly as yet uncatalogued) Dobson Papers in the Allport Library and Museum of Fine Arts. Other official correspondence relating to his time as Commandant is included in 2 volumes of the Historical Records of Australia Series, as cited above, plus the Colonial Secretary Index of the New South Wales Government of the day.

=== Subsequent activities: Ceylon and Scotland ===
Resuming his military career, Geils accompanied his regiment to Ceylon in 1814 for 2 years, accompanied initially by his family, notwithstanding the fact that his wife Mary had received a land grant at "Pittwater" (now Sorell) to the extent of 860 acres in the same year, with the apparent intention of the land being destined for use by her husband since it was considered improper for the latter to receive land on account of his (recent) position. His regiment, the 1st Battalion took part in the Second Kandyan War in Ceylon in 1815.

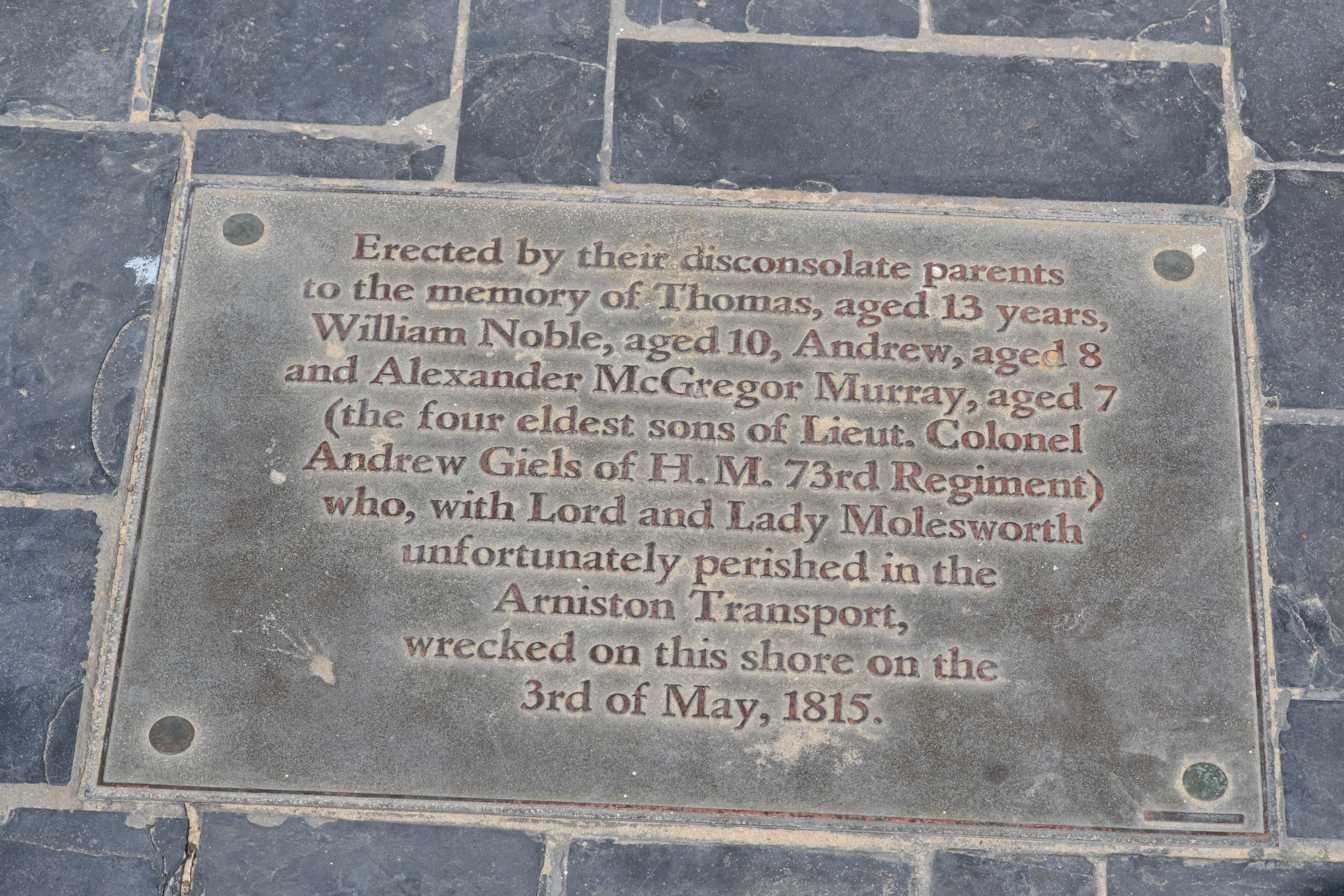
Memorial at Arniston, Western Cape, South Africa to the Geils children who perished in the Arniston Transport shipwreck, 3 May 1815

In 1815, a family tragedy occurred: while returning to England unaccompanied by their parents, Geils' four eldest sons all perished by drowning during the loss of the Arniston in May which hit a reef off Waenhuiskrans, South Africa (the latter location since renamed "Arniston") with the loss of 367 lives. A plaque at the site subsequently erected by Mrs Geils commemorates this sad event (refer illustration).

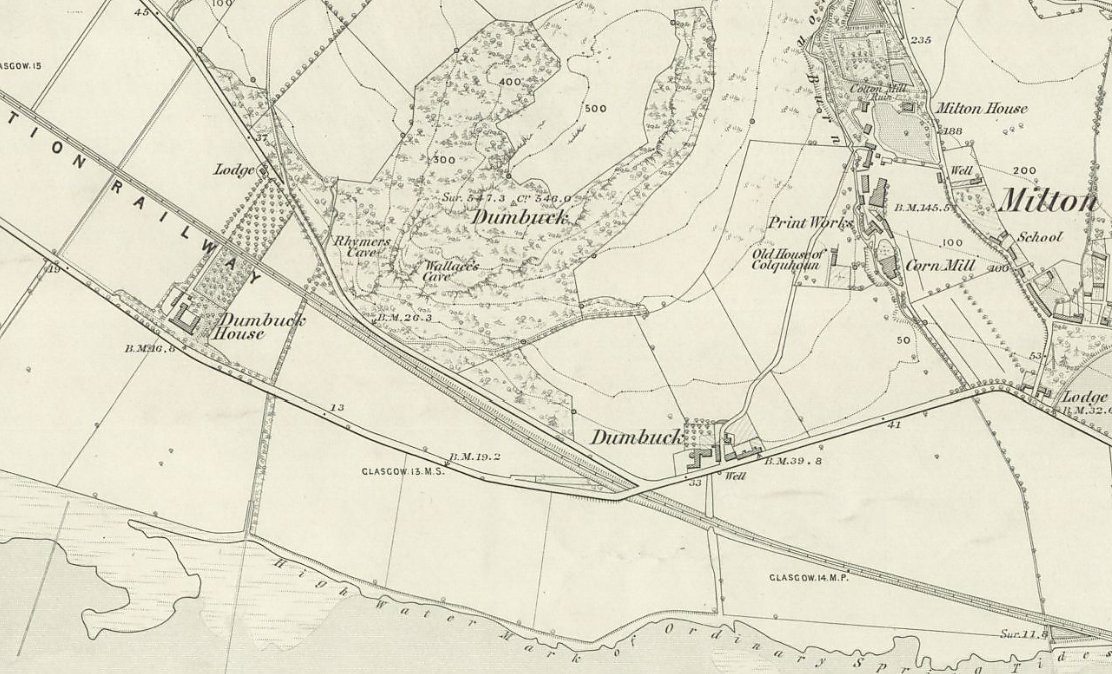
Dumbuck house, village and Dumbuck Hill on the 1864 6 inches to 1 mile Ordnance Survey map (Dumbartonshire, Sheet XXII). The estate is bisected by the newly constructed Caledonian and Dumbartonshire Junction Railway, opened in 1850. Later, early in the twentieth century, portions of the estate were utilised by the bizarre and possibly unscrupulous Kosmoid Company which claimed to have discovered the secret of creating gold from base metals by an industrial process, in addition to an offshoot Kosmoid Tubes, the only genuinely successful portion of the Company, later re-structured as the Dumbarton Weldless Tube Company, which in turn was subsumed by the firm of Babcock & Wilcox in 1915. Later, commencing in the 1950s, the area around the House was almost completely covered with bonded warehouses for the storage of Scotch Whisky, as visible in this Google Earth view.

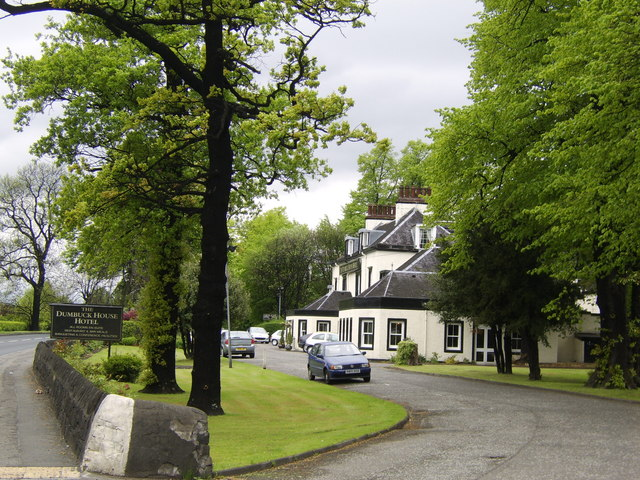
Dumbuck House (with later extensions) as a hotel in 2007. In more recent times, the future of this former "Category B" listed building had been uncertain and it was eventually demolished in 2024 following several fires in the property.

In October that year, Geils' father Thomas died in Scotland and left Andrew one of his four estates, that of Dumbuck, near the town of Dumbarton, purchased just 2 months previously. In 1818 Geils was reported as taking half-pay, effectively a type of retirement from active service, freeing him to reside in a place of his own choosing, so his move to Scotland probably occurred then; in April 1919 his wife gave birth to an (unnamed) son at Dumbuck, followed by a son Andrew Alexander in 1820 (see below) plus a daughter at Dumbuck named Isabella in around 1821. Since Andrew Alexander is given as the eighth son on his memorial, an additional son must also have been born in the period between 1814 and 1819, details of whom are not currently known. From a later (1882) court case involving whether or not the owner of the Dumbuck estate, plus another different one, held rights to the foreshore of the Clyde River adjoining their properties, the Dumbuck Estate at the time of its 1815 acquisition was described in the following terms:

All and whole the following parts and portions of the lands and barony of Colquhoun, viz., the lands of Milton of Colquhoun, now called Dumbuck, sometime including therein those parts thereof feued to two vassals at Milton and feu-duties payable for the same, Item, the lands called Easter, Upper and Lower Mains of Colquhoun, with houses, biggings, yards, whole pendicles and pertinents of the said several lands, and with the small island fishings and yares in the river Clyde, and all others belonging to the said lands, and with the teinds, parsonage and vicarage, of the same, mills, mill lands, fishings, and others ... which lands by the said trust-disposition are appointed to be thereafter called the barony or estate of Dumbuck.

In 1824 Geils had a new house constructed, Dumbuck House, which survived until recently as a Scottish Category B Listed building, the building extended in the twentieth century by its later owners and subsequently operated as a locally well known establishment, the Dumbuck House Hotel, although as at February 2023 it had ceased to operate as a hotel and was of an uncertain future; after two fires the by then vacant building was eventually demolished in 2024. The value of the Col. Geils' estate was given as £1,100 per year during the latter's lifetime in an 1848 court case regarding his son, equivalent to around £180,000 per year in 2023 UK pounds, although it was also noted that at that time the estate was heavily mortgaged.

Presumably on account of his recent move to Scotland, Geils' Tasmanian properties were offered for sale in 1818 and again in 1821, eventually being purchased in 1832 by another landowner with interests in the area, Thomas Gregson. It is possible that the Geilston area properties had intermediate purchasers as well, since Thomas Scott's 1824 "Chart of Van Diemen's Land" shows 2 blocks adjacent to Geilston Bay then being owned by "Judge Advocate" and "Mr. Cassidy", respectively, while Geils' other properties at Risdon and Sorell (the latter labelled "Pittwater") are still shown as owned by Geils.

Little further information is known regarding Geils' time in Scotland from that point, except that the couple had at least 2 further children (sons) in addition to the daughter Isabella, as mentioned above, since the Geils monument in the churchyard at Old Kilpatrick includes a separate tablet commemorating "their eighth son Capt Andrew Alexander Geils, Madrass Fusiliers, born 26th April 1820, died 4th March 1854" (refer "External links").

Geils died at Dumbuck in 1843, the property then passing to his eldest surviving son, John Edward Geils. His youngest daughter, Isabella, born at Dumbuck, married Molyneux Hyde Nepean, eldest son of Sir Molyneux Hyde Nepean of Loders and Bothenhampton in the county of Dorset, becoming Lady Nepean on the succession of her husband, the younger Molyneux Nepean, to the baronetcy in 1856 upon the death of his father. A memorial to the Geils family members as presently detailed, including Andrew, his wife Mary and their son (Captain) John Edward, all of Dumbuck, together with a separate stone for Andrew Alexander, is still extant in the churchyard at Old Kilpatrick, the parish in which Dumbuck is located.
