= Shag Bay =

- Location: Tasmania, Australia
- Coordinates: 42.835°S 147.333°E
- Type: Bay
- Part of: East Risdon State Reserve

Shag Bay is an inlet on the River Derwent near Geilston Bay, Tasmania, and is within the East Risdon State Reserve. The area around Shag Bay contains a number of Aboriginal Tasmanian shell middens. A bone meal fertiliser factory was established in Shag Bay in the early 1900s. In January 1915, its boiler exploded, resulting in two deaths of two people associated with the factory. The brigantine built in 1814 HMS Nelson was towed to Shag Bay in 1920 to be broken up after it finished its use as a coal hulk.

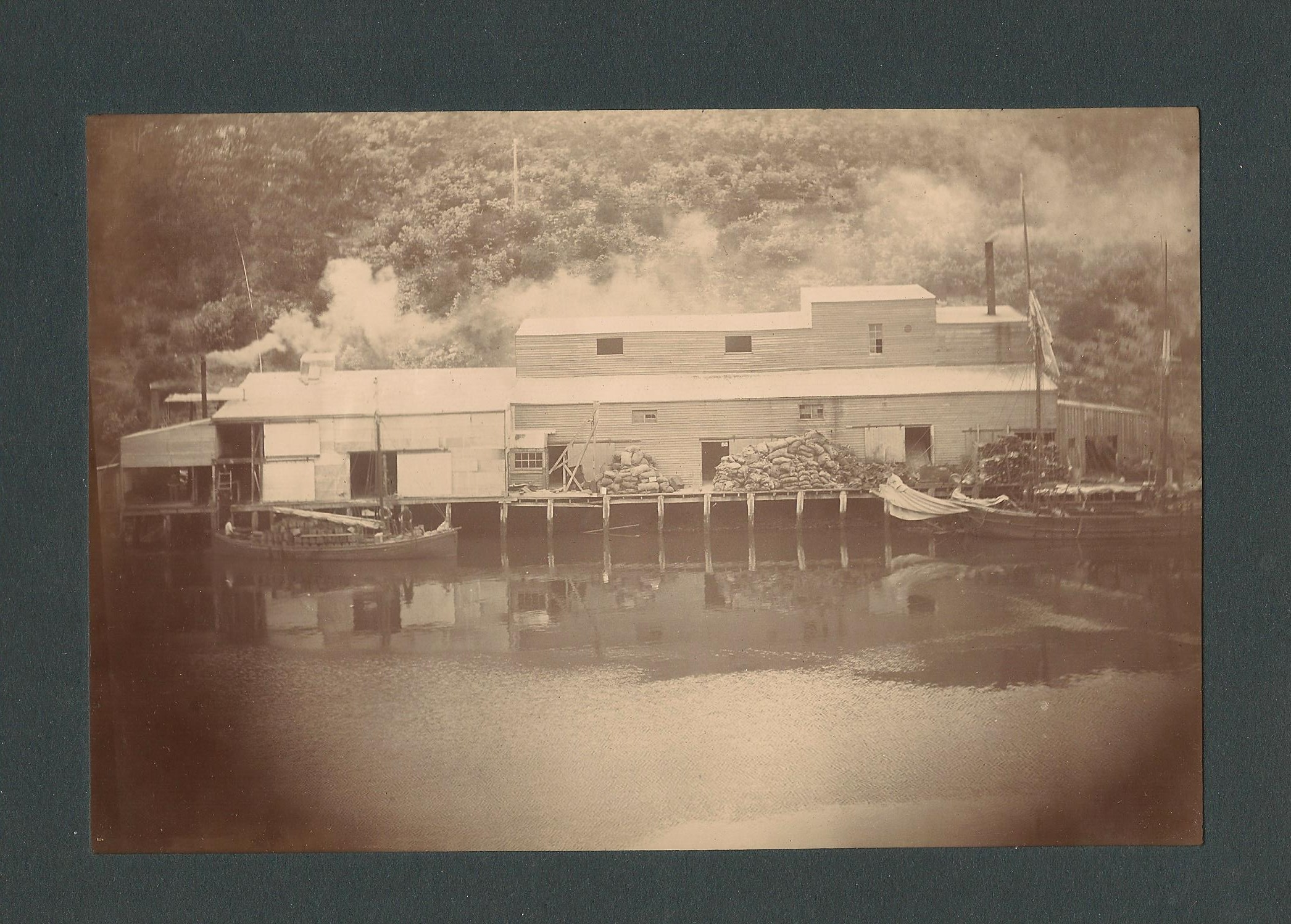
Russell Family Bone Mill Shag Bay Tasmania
