= Gunners Quoin =

Mountain in Tasmania, Australia

Highest point
- Elevation: 423 m (1,388 ft)
- Prominence: 106 m (348 ft)
- Coordinates: 42.76859°S 147.32460°E

Geography
- Location: Tasmania, Australia
- Parent range: Meehan Range

Geology
- Mountain type: Mountain
- Rock type: Dolerite

Climbing
- Easiest route: Bushwalk

Gunners Quoin (/ˈɡʌnəzˈkɔɪn/ GUN-əz-COIN) is a distinctive mountain located in Tasmania, Australia. The formation is part of the Meehan Range. It is situated between the City of Clarence and Brighton Council local government areas on Hobart’s eastern shore. Known for its unique jagged shape and prominence in the surrounding landscape, the Quoin is a popular site for bushwalking, photography, and ecological studies due to its rich biodiversity and striking geological features.

== Geography ==
Gunners Quoin is situated northeast of Hobart, Tasmania's capital city, in a region characterised by rugged terrain and dense forests. Sources vary on the mountain’s exact elevation, with listings citing either 423 metres (1,388 ft), or 449 metres (1,473 ft). The mountain offers panoramic views of the River Derwent and surrounding valleys. It is accessible via the East Derwent Highway.

== Geology ==
Rock climbing at Gunners Quoin, c. 1973

The geology of Gunners Quoin is significant for its composition of dolerite, a type of igneous rock that forms much of Tasmania’s mountainous terrain. The mountain’s features were shaped by glacial and tectonic activity during the Palaeozoic and Mesozoic eras.

== Name origin ==
The name "Gunners Quoin" is believed to have originally been "Gunning’s Quoin," in honour of Lieutenant G. V. Gunning, who arrived in colonial Van Diemen's Land in 1810 and later settled in the Richmond district.

The term "quoin" has architectural origins, referring to the cornerstones of a building that reinforce its structure. This may relate to the mountain’s dolerite formations, which resemble robust architectural features. The word itself comes from the French coin and Latin cuneus, meaning "wedge". Historical artillery usage of the term "quoin" for cannon operation could also have influenced the name.

== Flora and fauna ==
The mountain supports a variety of plant species, including eucalyptus forests and heathland. Its slopes are home to several endemic flora species, contributing to the area’s ecological importance. Fauna includes marsupials such as wallabies and wombats, as well as bird species like the wedge-tailed eagle and the Tasmanian devil.

== Recreation ==
Gunners Quoin is a destination for outdoor enthusiasts, offering trails suitable for bushwalking and some opportunities for rock climbing. The area provides excellent spots for wildlife observation and is popular among nature photographers.
