= Geilston Bay High School =

Location
- Geilston Bay, Hobart, Tasmania; Australia; 42°50′15″S 147°20′56″E

Information
- Type: Government comprehensive secondary school
- Established: 9 February 1972
- Status: Closed
- Closed: 9 December 2013
- School district: Southern
- Educational authority: Department for Education, Children and Young People
- Oversight: Office of Tasmanian Assessment, Standards & Certification
- Years: 7–10
- Gender: Co-educational
- Campus type: Suburban
- Colours: Gold and brown

Geilston Bay High School was a government co-educational comprehensive secondary school located in Geilston Bay, a suburb of Hobart, Tasmania, Australia. Established in 1972, the school catered for students from Years 7 to 10 until its closure in 2013.

== Overview ==
Along with Clarence High School, Rokeby High School, and Rose Bay High School, Geilston Bay High School was one of four government high schools within Clarence. The school emblem was the Eucalyptus risdonii, a local eucalyptus variety with bluish-silver leaves that is found only within the City of Clarence.

== History ==
Construction of the school began in 1971 on the site of the old Lindisfarne Golf Course. The first phase of construction was completed on 1 July 1971.

Geilston Bay High School was opened on 9 February 1972 as the then Municipality of Clarence was enjoying a boom in residential expansion. The opening of the Hobart Bridge (1943), and later the Tasman Bridge (1964) saw a dramatic expansion of residential areas within Clarence. However, prior to the Tasman Bridge disaster in 1975, there were few facilities located on the eastern shore of the River Derwent. The severing of the bridge made local authorities realise the need for localised services in areas of commerce, health care and education.

Geilston Bay High School was the most recently opened high school within the City of Clarence, after Warrane High (1957), Clarence High (1959), and Rose Bay High (1961).

In 2007 Geilston Bay High School celebrated its 35th anniversary.

Geilston Bay High School closed on 19 December 2013. Low enrolment numbers was cited as the reason.

Towards the head of the Bay, the (former) school playing fields cover what was once the Geilston Bay fossil site, which yielded fossil plants and animal bones in the nineteenth century of Late Oligocene (or possible early Miocene) age, including mammals that at one time were the earliest known from Australia.

== See also ==
- List of schools in Tasmania
- Education in Tasmania
