= Mount Direction =

Mountain near Hobart, Tasmania

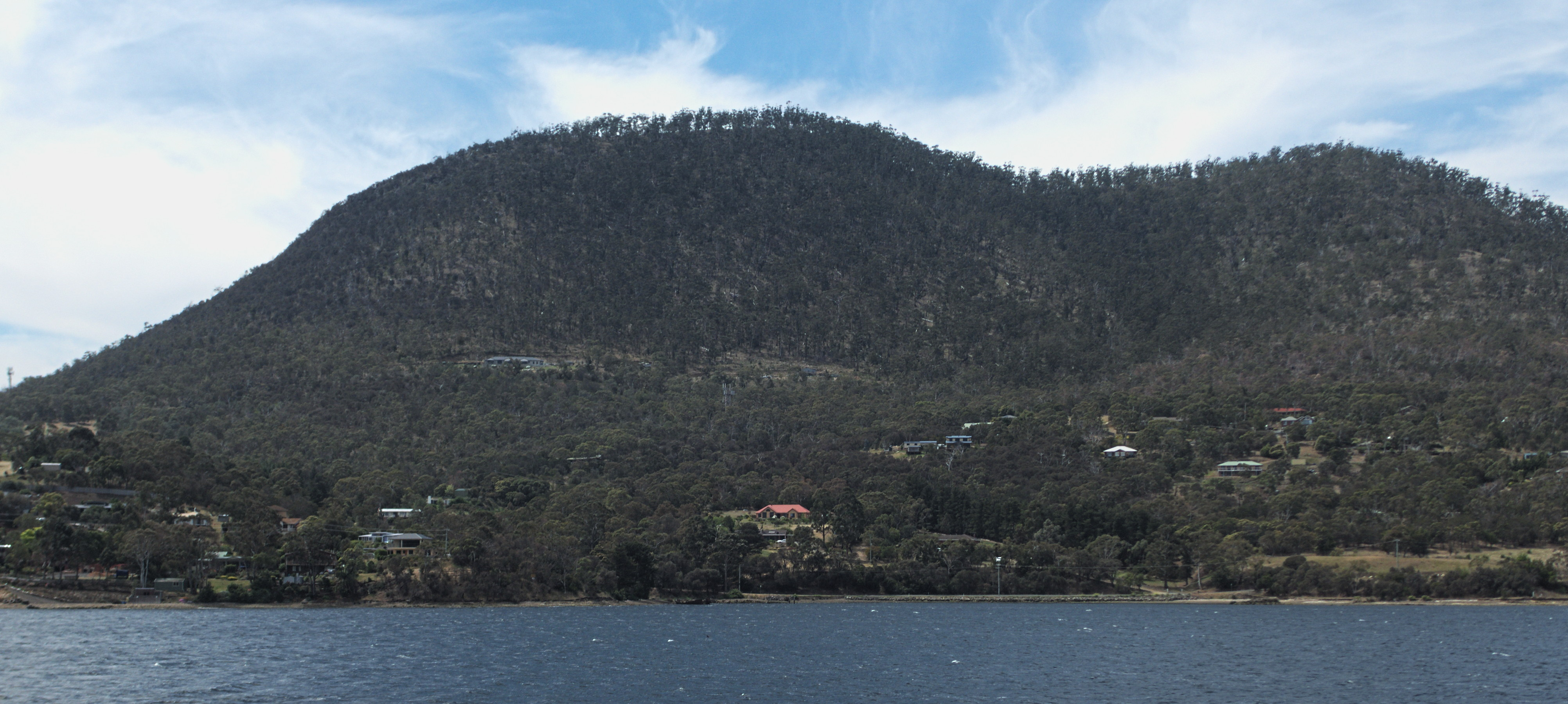
- Mount Direction as seen from the surrounding area

Highest point
- Elevation: 418 m (1,371 ft)
- Coordinates: 42°47′46″S 147°18′38″E

Geography
- Location: Tasmania, Australia
- Parent range: Meehan Range

Geology
- Mountain type: Jurassic
- Rock type: Dolerite

Climbing
- Easiest route: Bushwalk

Mount Direction is a prominent mountain located within Greater Hobart, situated on the city's eastern shore. Part of the Meehan Range, it rises to an elevation of 418 metres (1,371 ft) and is situated between the Clarence and Brighton Council local government areas. Its distinct curved shape makes it a visually striking feature of the landscape and one of the most prominent natural landmarks on the eastern shore of the River Derwent.

== Geography ==
Mount Direction is approximately 16 kilometres (9.9 mi) northeast of the Hobart central business district. From its summit, the mountain offers panoramic views of the Derwent estuary, surrounding waterways, and the Greater Hobart area. Its geology is dominated by dolerite, an igneous rock common to Tasmania, formed through ancient glacial and tectonic activity.

== History ==
Mount Direction has significant cultural and historical importance. It was part of the traditional lands of the Moomairremener people, a clan of the Paredarerme of the Tasmanian Aboriginal (Palawa) people. The mountain and its surrounding areas were integral to their way of life, providing resources and holding spiritual significance. The slopes of the mountain, overlooking the River Derwent, were used for hunting, gathering, and other daily activities.

In 1794, Lieutenant John Hayes of the East India Company named Mount Direction during his exploration of the River Derwent. Hayes recognised the mountain's prominence as a navigational landmark.

Four years later, in 1798, George Bass climbed Mount Direction during his circumnavigation of Tasmania with Matthew Flinders. This marked the first recorded European ascent of the mountain. Bass also became the first European to climb nearby Mount Wellington.

In 1803, Lieutenant John Bowen established Tasmania’s first European settlement at Risdon Cove, located on the southern slopes of Mount Direction. This site was also the location of the first recorded hostile conflict between the Tasmanian Aboriginal people and British settlers. This tragic event marked the beginning of a long and devastating period of displacement and violence for the Moomairremener people and other Indigenous communities in Tasmania.

== Art and cultural depictions ==
Mount Direction’s profile has been the subject of numerous artistic works:

- Joseph Lycett, in his early colonial landscapes of the River Derwent.
- John Skinner Prout, whose works are held in collections such as the National Gallery of Victoria.
- Edith Holmes, in her painting Mount Direction, Tasmania (1948).

== Recreation ==
Mount Direction is popular for bushwalking, with the Mount Direction Track offering a well-maintained route to the summit. Managed by the City of Clarence, the trail allows visitors to enjoy scenic views, diverse flora, and the chance to observe local wildlife.

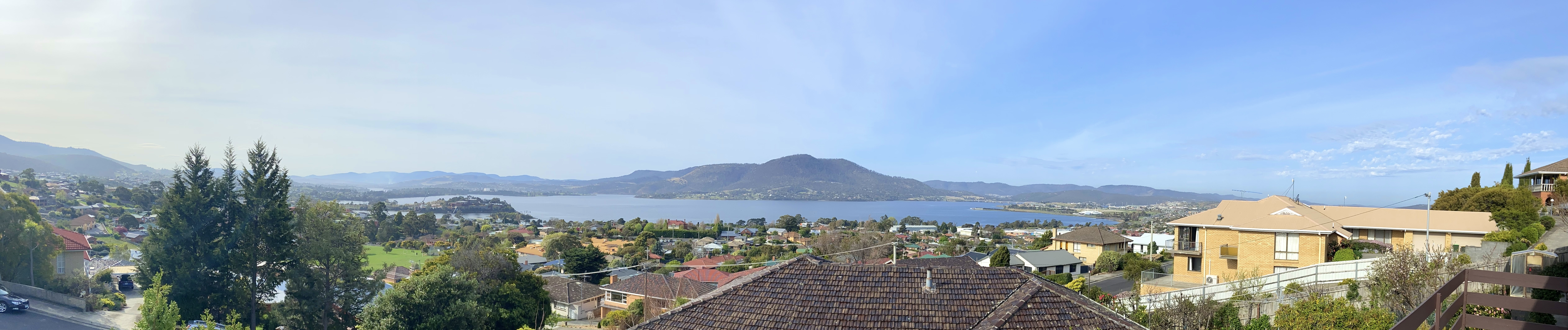
Suburban panorama of Mount Direction from Rosetta

== Flora and fauna ==
The mountain supports a variety of plant species, including eucalyptus forests and heathlands. It is home to local wildlife such as wallabies, possums, and a variety of bird species, including the wedge-tailed eagle.
