= South-east Tasmania Important Bird Area =

Region in Tasmania, Australia

Coordinates: 42°59′35″S 147°25′56″E

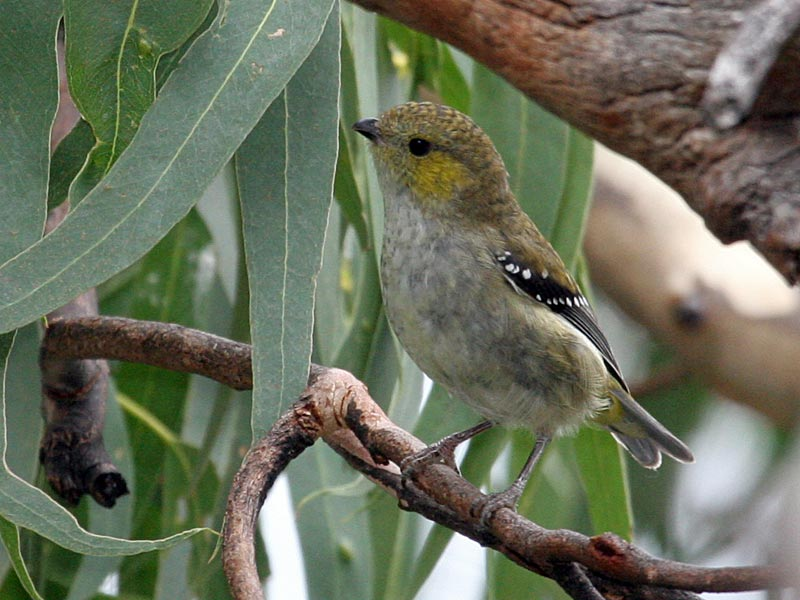
The IBA is an important area for forty-spotted pardalotes

The South-east Tasmania Important Bird Area encompasses much of the land retaining forest and woodland habitats, suitable for breeding swift parrots and forty-spotted pardalotes, from Orford to Recherche Bay in south-eastern Tasmania, Australia.

== Features and location ==
This large 335,777-hectare (829,720-acre) Important Bird Area (IBA) comprises wet and dry eucalypt forests containing old growth Tasmanian blue gums or black gums, and grassy manna gum woodlands, as well as suburban residential centres and farmland where they retain large flowering, and adjacent hollow-bearing, trees. Key tracts of forest within the IBA include Wielangta, the Meehan and Wellington Ranges, and the Tasman Peninsula.

The area has been identified by BirdLife International as an IBA because it contains almost all the breeding habitat of the endangered swift parrot on the Tasmanian mainland, several populations of the endangered forty-spotted pardalote, as well as good numbers of flame and pink robins, striated fieldwrens and populations of all of Tasmania's endemic bird species.
