= Meehan Range =

Protected area in Tasmania, Australia

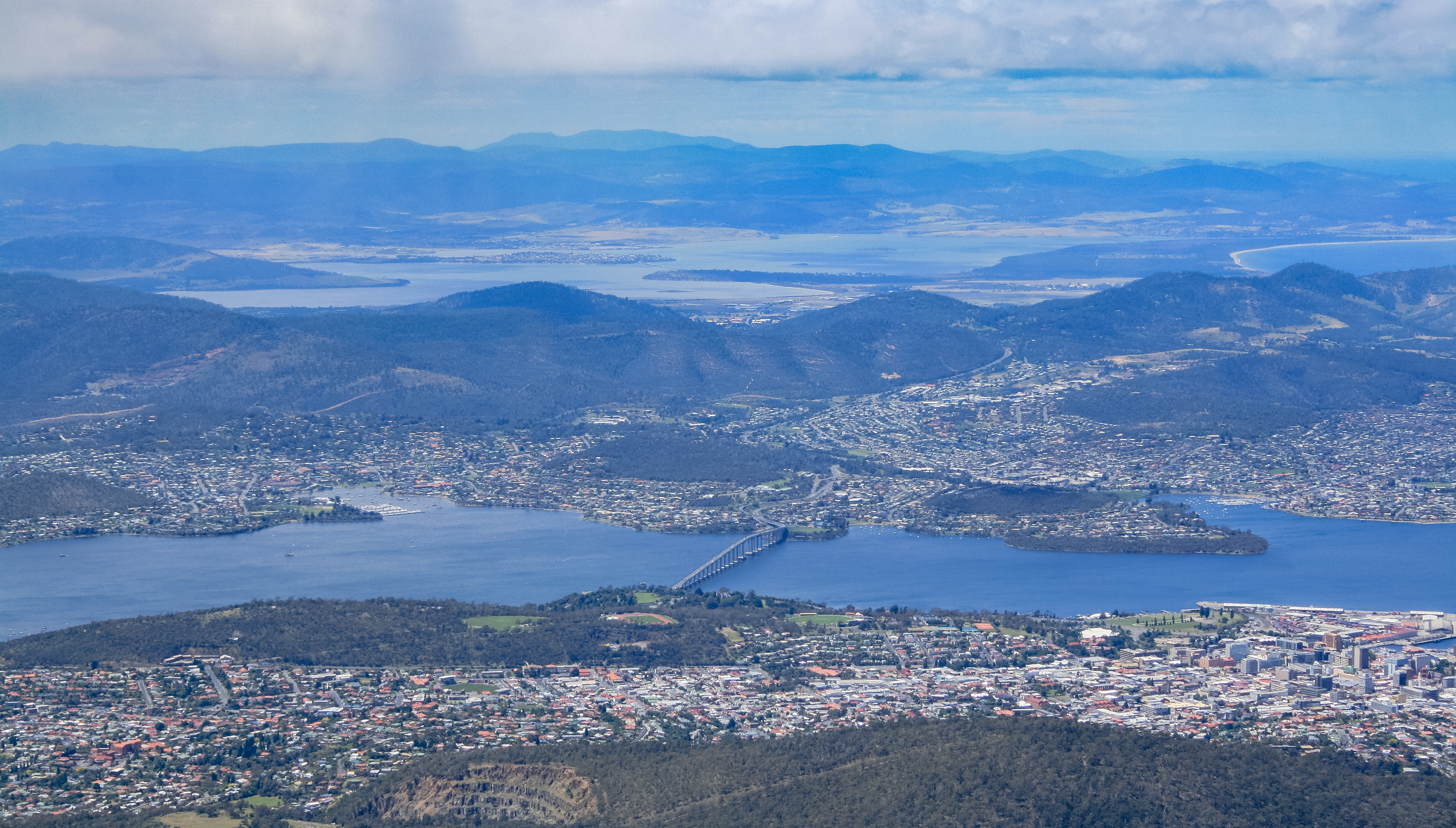
- Mid-section of the range viewed from Mount Wellington

- Location within Tasmania
- Location: Tasmania
- Nearest city: Hobart
- Coordinates: 42.782479°S 147.322823°E
- Governing body: Tasmania Parks & Wildlife Service

The Meehan Range (/ˈmiːənreɪndʒ/ MEE-ən-RAYNJ) is a prominent geographic feature in southeastern Tasmania, consisting of steep hills and ridges running parallel to the River Derwent on the eastern shore of Hobart. Situated primarily in the City of Clarence, the range is protected as a natural area and offers a mix of conservation and recreational opportunities. The range includes bushwalking tracks and a growing network of mountain bike trails.

The range is named after James Meehan, an early surveyor of colonial Van Diemen's Land. It features two distinct orientations: the western slopes face the River Derwent and are heavily urbanised, while the eastern slopes overlook Pitt Water and remain largely rural, although increasingly subdivided into commuter properties.

== Environment ==
The Meehan Range is largely covered in native bushland and serves as critical habitat for a variety of flora and fauna. The range forms part of the South-east Tasmania Important Bird Area, identified by BirdLife International for its importance in conserving woodland birds, including the endangered swift parrot and forty-spotted pardalote.

Native vegetation include Eucalyptus amygdalina, Eucalyptus viminalis and Eucalyptus risdonii, commonly known as the Risdon peppermint, a rare mallee-form eucalypt endemic to Tasmania. The Risdon peppermint is greatly confined to the dry slopes of the Meehan Range, facing north-east to west, along the eastern shore of the River Derwent between Risdon and Grasstree Hill, with a smaller population at Mangalore. The species grows on Permian mudstone, ranging from sea level to elevations of 150 metres (490 ft). Its glaucous blue-gray foliage produces an aromatic, menthol-scented peppermint oil. The Risdon Peppermint is classified as "rare" under the Tasmanian Government's Threatened Species Protection Act 1995.

=== Conservation ===
Efforts by the Tasmania Parks & Wildlife Service aim to preserve the range's biodiversity while accommodating sustainable recreational use. However, its natural bushland makes it highly vulnerable to bushfires during dry summers, as evidenced by the 1967 Hobart fires and the 2016 Tasmanian bushfires, which caused significant damage.

== Geology ==
The Meehan Range is characterised by its Jurassic dolerite, formed approximately 165 million years ago during volcanic and tectonic activity. The range also contains older sedimentary rocks from the Permian and Triassic periods, as well as occasional basalt outcrops.

=== Jurassic dolerite ===
The range's predominant rock type is dolerite, formed when magma cooled slowly underground. This coarse-grained igneous rock creates cliffs, ridges, and nutrient-rich soils, supporting diverse vegetation.

=== Permian and Triassic sedimentary rocks ===
Beneath the dolerite are layers of sedimentary rocks, including mudstone, sandstone, and limestone, deposited in ancient marine and riverine environments.

=== Basalt outcrops ===
Less common than dolerite, basalt outcrops in the range formed through surface volcanic eruptions and add to the area's geological diversity.

== Prominent Peaks ==
The Meehan Range includes several notable peaks, each offering unique geographic and recreational features:

- Mount Direction: 418 metres (1,371 ft), known for its historical significance and views of the Derwent River.
- Gunners Quoin: 361 metres (1,184 ft), recognised for its dramatic dolerite cliffs and distinctive shape.
- Flagstaff Hill: 435 metres (1,427 ft), the highest point in the range and the centre of the Meehan Range Nature Recreation Area.
- Eagles Hill: 396 metres (1,299 ft), offering panoramic views and accessible trails.
- Craigow Hill: 395 metres (1,296 ft), popular for bushwalking.
- Golden Hill: 261 metres (856 ft).
- Tunnel Hill: 273 metres (896 ft).
- Caves Hill: 246 metres (807 ft).

These peaks are interconnected by trails, making the range a hub for outdoor recreation.

== Recreation ==
The Meehan Range is a popular destination for outdoor activities, including bushwalking, rock climbing, and mountain biking.

=== Bushwalking ===
The range features an extensive network of trails, including tracks leading to scenic lookouts with views of the River Derwent, Hobart, and Pitt Water.

=== Mountain Biking ===
The Meehan Range is home to the Clarence Mountain Bike Park, which offers a variety of trails ranging from beginner-friendly routes to advanced downhill tracks. Recent upgrades have enhanced the park's facilities, including the addition of the Jack Jumper Jumps Trail, a technical track designed for experienced riders.

== History ==
The Meehan Range has a long and significant history, extending back thousands of years. It was originally home to the Mumirimina people, a tribe of the Paredarerme nation, whose presence reflected a deep connection to the land through traditional practices such as corroborees, hunting, and other cultural activities. However, colonial records provide only sparse documentation of their way of life.

In 1803, Lieutenant John Bowen established a settlement at nearby Risdon Cove, marking the beginning of British colonisation in Van Diemen's Land (modern-day Tasmania). The dispossession of the Mumirimina people from the Meehan Range and surrounding areas occurred early, rapidly, and extensively as European settlement expanded. By the early 19th century, most of the tribe had been displaced, with little documentation of their traditional lifestyle surviving in historical records. Archaeological discoveries, such as tools crafted from dark green bottle glass found alongside stone tools near the Bagdad Rivulet, Kutalayna levee at Brighton, and Crooked Billet, suggest intermittent Aboriginal presence in the region after European contact.

The Meehan Range was named after James Meehan, a surveyor who conducted mapping work in the area during the early 19th century. Between 1803 and 1806, Meehan explored the upper Derwent Valley and eastwards to Pitt Water, searching for land suitable for settlement and grants.

Decades later, the range was traversed by a railway tunnel 173 m (568 ft) long and situated 12 m (39 ft) below the surface as part of the Bellerive to Sorell railway line, which operated from 2 May 1892 until its closure on 30 June 1926.

In the 1960s, the Meehan Range became home to the Canopus Hill Observatory. The observatory's 1-metre optical telescope played a key role in international research, including the detection of exoplanets through microlensing and the study of the atmospheric structure of giant stars. Notable contributions included identifying a dense atmosphere around Pluto and researching the optical counterparts of X-ray pulsars and transients.

By the mid-20th century, parts of the Meehan Range were repurposed for military use, including training exercises and the development of communications infrastructure.

Passing through the Meehan Range, the first section of the Tasman Highway between Rosny Hill Road and Mornington opened in 1974. During the 1990s, the section of highway between Mornington and the Hobart Airport was fully duplicated with funds from the federal government.

In 2015, the Astronomical Society of Tasmania in collaboration with UTAS relocated its telescopes to the purpose-built Mount Pleasant Radio Observatory near Cambridge.

=== 2006 Fires ===
In October 2006, a bushfire ignited in the Meehan Range, rapidly spreading due to strong winds and dry conditions. The fire threatened homes in nearby suburbs, including Flagstaff Gully, Lindisfarne, and Geilston Bay. Over 40 firefighting crews worked to contain the blaze, and a timely wind change helped redirect the flames away from residential areas, averting widespread property damage. The fire, however, caused significant environmental damage, burning through native bushland and impacting local wildlife.

=== Flagstaff Gully Quarry ===
Flagstaff Gully Quarry, located at the foothills of the range in Lindisfarne, has operated since the 1960s and is notable for its innovative environmental practices. Managed by Hanson Construction Materials, the quarry features a Terex MJ47 Modular Plant installed in 2015, capable of processing 350 tonnes (771,618 lb) per hour. The site also uses an 840 metres (2,756 ft) downhill, power-generating conveyor, reducing energy consumption and environmental impact.

In 2016, the Environment Protection Authority approved a 24-hour bitumen plant at the quarry, increasing production capacity from 20,000 tonnes (44,092,452 lb) to 50,000 tonnes (110,231,131 lb) annually. The EPA imposed conditions to manage air emissions and noise pollution, including emission controls and monitoring of vehicle movements. The quarry has received environmental awards for its sustainable practices and continues to operate under comprehensive environmental management plans.
