= Risdon, Tasmania =

Risdon
- Suburb
- Interactive map of Risdon
- Coordinates: 42°49′28″S 147°19′3″E
- Country: Australia
- State: Tasmania
- City: Hobart
- LGA: City of Clarence

Government
  - Federal division: Franklin

Population
  - Total: 296 (2016 census)
- Postcode: 7017
Suburbs around Risdon
(Bowen Bridge)	Otago	Risdon Cove
River Derwent	Risdon	Risdon Vale
River Derwent	Geilston Bay

Risdon is a suburb of Hobart, capital city of Tasmania. It is west of Risdon Vale.

== History ==
It derives its name from Captain William Bellamy Risdon, second officer of the ship Duke of Clarence, which visited the area as part of Sir John Hayes' expedition in 1793. Risdon Post Office opened on 1 July 1864. It was named "Gregson" during 1911. Historical landmarks in Risdon include Cleburne Homestead, a house next to the Bowen Bridge built in the 1820s, Saracen's Head Inn, a charming sandstone hotel built in c. 1828, Risdon Brook Bridge, a sandstone-arched bridge over the Risdon Brook built in 1858, and finally St. Margaret's Church, an abandoned wooden church that opened in 1867.

== Zinc works ==
Between 1916 and 1920 Electrolytic Zinc developed a zinc refinery, known as the "Risdon works", and an eponymously named suburb.

In 1956, as part of the refinery complex, EZ started a sulphate of ammonia plant.

The owners of the plant in 1987 considered expansion of the refinery.

Currently the zinc works and former workers housing area are found in Lutana.

== Eucalyptus risdonii ==
Eucalyptus risdonii is native to this location and was the emblem of Geilston Bay High School.
