= Geilston Bay, Tasmania =

Geilston Bay
- Suburb
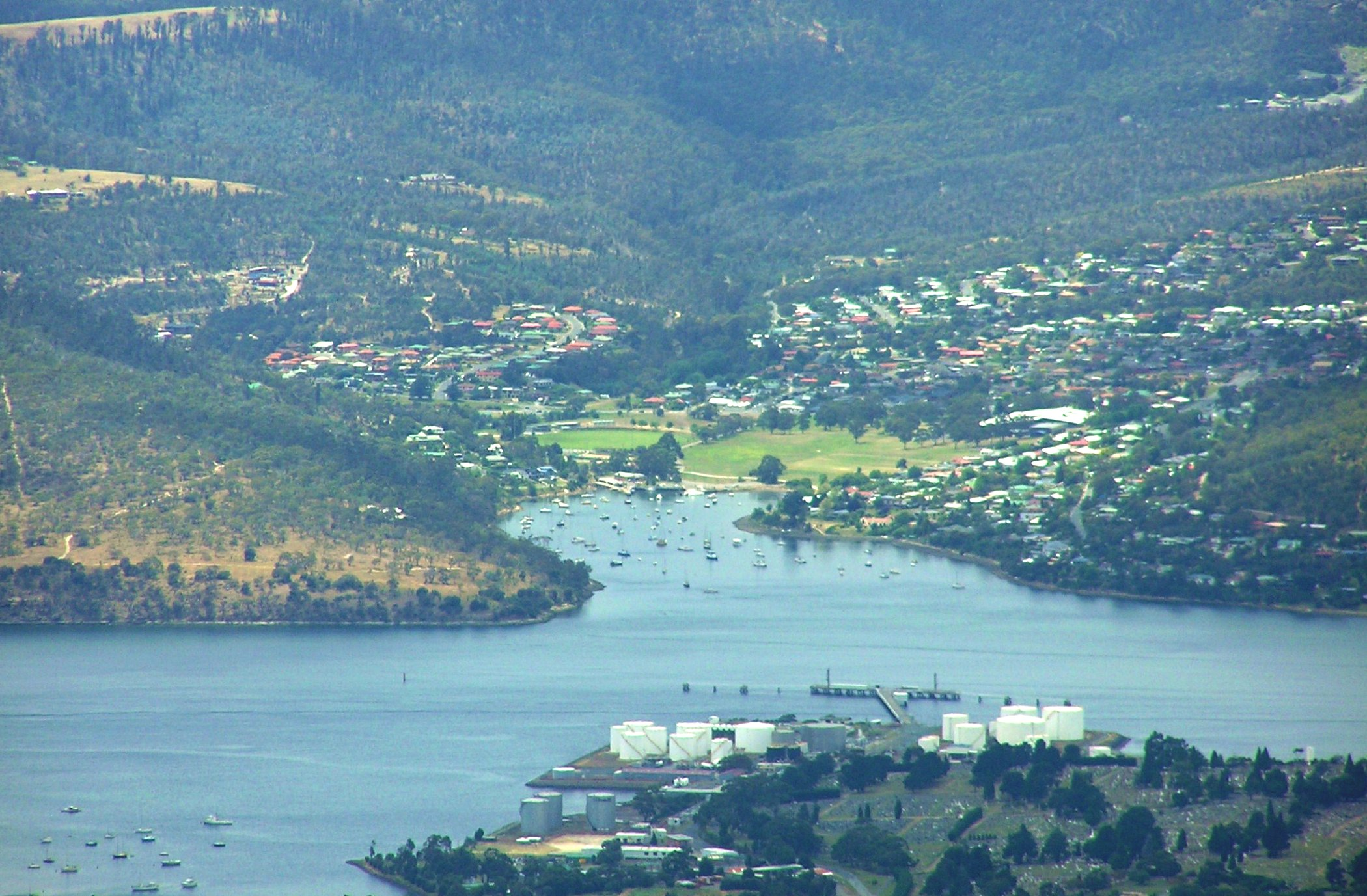
- View from Mount Wellington

- Interactive map of Geilston Bay
- Coordinates: 42°50′11″S 147°21′4″E
- Country: Australia
- State: Tasmania
- City: Hobart
- LGA: City of Clarence

Government
  - Federal division: Franklin

Population
  - Total: 3,461 (SAL 2021)
- Postcode: 7015
Suburbs around Geilston Bay
Risdon	isdon Vale	Risdon Vale
River Derwent	Geilston Bay
River Derwent	Lindisfarne	Flagstaff Gully

Geilston Bay is a largely residential suburb of Hobart between Risdon Vale, Shag Bay, and Lindisfarne, in the City of Clarence located on the Eastern Shore of the River Derwent, taking its name from an inlet of that river of the same name. The inlet and locality were sometimes known by the alternative name Limekiln Bay on account of lime kilns which operated there between approximately the 1830s and the 1920s, the remains of which remained visible for some decades thereafter; another early name for the Bay was "James's Bay". The present suburb name derives from an early land holding "Geils Town" in the region purchased by Andrew Geils, Commandant of Van Diemen's Land (Tasmania) for a brief period in 1812-1813, who subsequently left his Australian holdings behind when he moved back to Scotland.

The nationally significant Late Oligocene (or early Miocene) "Geilston Bay Local Fauna" fossil find originates from this locality. Fossil mammal remains at this site were discovered by limestone quarrying activities in the 1860s and sent to the British Museum in London for further analysis, where they still reside. However there are no surface indications of the location of the site today, which lies buried by landfill under the playing fields of the former Geilston Bay High School.

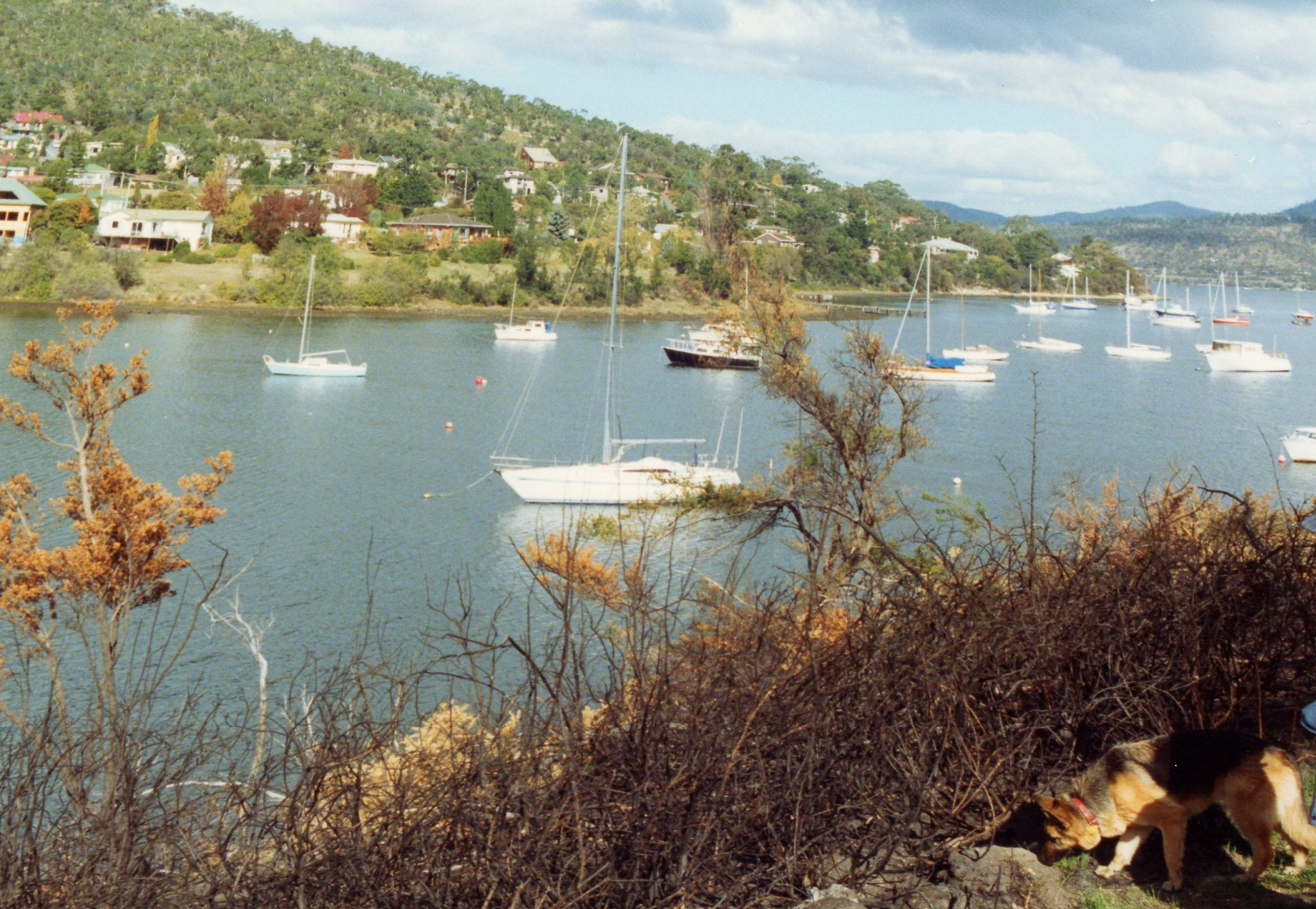
Geilston Bay, Tasmania in 1994

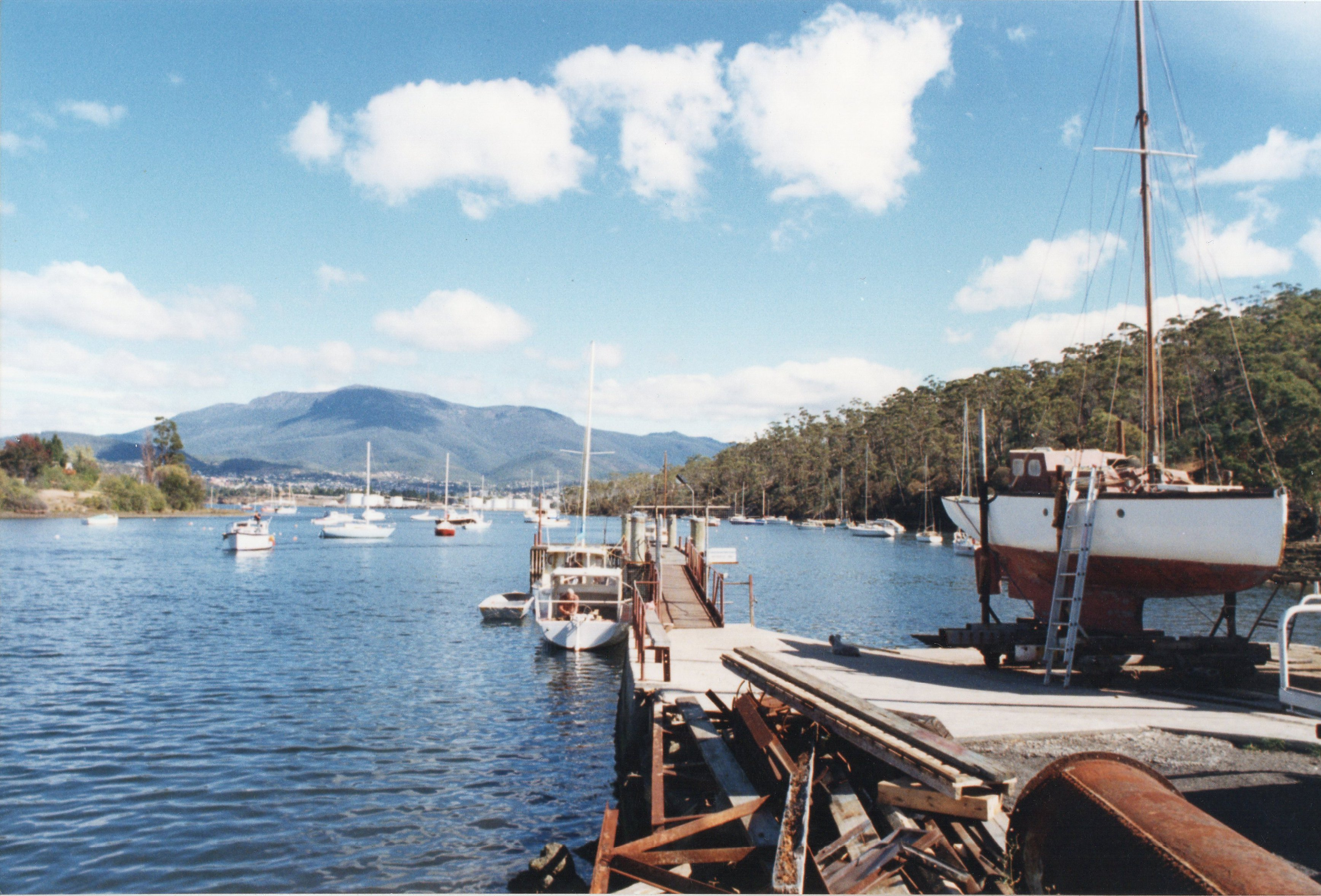
Geilston Bay, Tasmania in 1994 (another view)

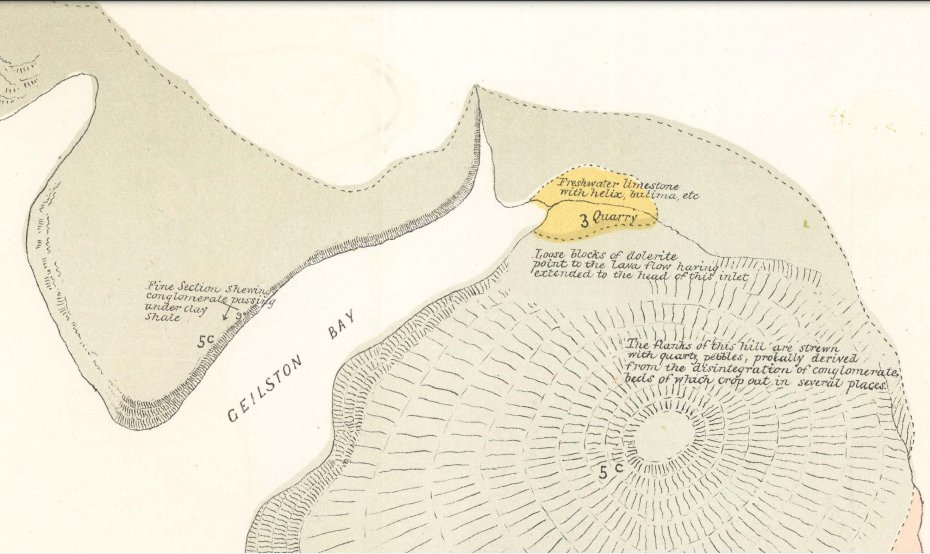
Detail from "Geological Sketch Map of Country around New Town" [Tasmania] accompanying Krausè's (1884) published report, showing the Geilston Bay freshwater limestone deposit and quarry location

== History ==
=== Aboriginal history ===
Prior to the British colonisation of Tasmania, this land, part of the Oyster Bay region, had been occupied for possibly as long as 35,000 years by the semi-nomadic Mumirimina people. Mouheneener shell middens can be found in the area between Geilston Bay and Shag Bay, along with the remains of an Aboriginal rock shelter.

=== European settlement ===
==== First settlers ====
The area now known as Geilston Bay was initially settled via a series of land grants of around 50-70 acres each to pioneer settlers including William Parish, Michael Mansfield, William Collins, and David Wakefield over the period 1806-1808. Parish, a former highwayman (armed robber) in England, had previously been transported to Australia, served his sentence, returned to England, and eventually came out to Australia once more in the role of a convict overseer at New Town from 1805, before being granted "70 acres on the eastern shore of the Derwent" in 1806. Mansfield, apparently a free settler, was granted "50 acres lying and situate on the River Derwent, Van Diemen's Land, on the East side of the Derwent" in 1808. In an 1809 "Muster of Settlers", Parish and Wakefield are not listed (perhaps their holdings were too new to have been developed) but Mansfield's holdings (with a wife) are described as "50 acres, 13 in wheat. 3 cattle, 12 sheep, 10 goats, 1 swine", while Collins' holdings are given as "50 acres, 6 in wheat. 2 cattle", both in the region known as "Risdon/Clarence Plains". Conditions for both farming and general dwelling would have been fairly primitive at that time, with few roads, travel to Hobart being only by boat, and constant threat of robbery by bushrangers: Withington (2009) notes that in February 1808, Parish was robbed by the violent bushrangers Richard Lemon and John Brown, the pair being apprehended by Mansfield with assistance of two others the following month, with Lemon resisting and being shot dead, and Brown captured and eventually hanged for his crimes in Sydney.

==== Geils era ====
Whatever modest farming ventures these new settlers had managed to set up were disrupted by the arrival in Hobart in February 1812 of Colonel Andrew Geils, newly appointed Commandant (acting Governor) of the settlement of Hobart Town, at that time established barely eight years earlier. Geils, a military officer with aspirations to an eventual government role, was the son of a General Thomas Geils who had purchased a number of country estates in the latter's native Scotland, and it seems that the son planned to follow in his father's footsteps in his new adopted colony, purchasing and then developing the "Restdown" homestead at the original Bowen settlement site at Risdon Cove; via a land grant to his wife, he also owned property in Pitt Water. At the present location he acquired and consolidated some 200 acres the same year by purchasing the grants of Mansfield, Parish, Wakefield and Collins, who then relocated elsewhere; possibly he also purchased other land in the district, since by 1867, when the property had long since passed out of Geils' ownership, a second parcel of land listed as "1515 acres, known as Geilstown" was also being offered for sale (see below). Under circumstances that have not yet been clarified, the holding and/or surrounding area then became known as "Geils Town".

Unfortunately for Geils, his appointment as Commandant was for one year only and his subsequent aspirations to be appointed Lieutenant-Governor of the Colony following Thomas Davey were thwarted by Governor Lachlan Macquarie, in whose opinion Geils' behaviour while in Office rendered him unsuitable. Geils decided to resume his military career and accompany his regiment to Ceylon in 1814–1815, apparently never seeing Tasmania (then known as Van Diemen's Land) again: in 1815 his father died in Scotland leaving him one of the latter's estates, that of Dumbuck in the parish of Old Kilpatrick, to which Geils appears to have located by around the end of the decade, having a daughter there in 1821 and a new house constructed for himself and his surviving family, Dumbuck House (later a hotel, however since demolished), residing there until his death in 1843.

During his short period of active involvement with his Tasmanian properties, Geils (or possibly his agents) appear to have established a farm on this particular holding known as "Geils Town Farm", described in 1818 as "200 acres opposite New Town", and later (April 1824) as "Geils' Town Farm ... to be let, for a term of years, a farm of 500 acres, called Geils' Town, about three miles from Hobart Town, on the Derwent." Ward's account, however, suggests that Geils spent most of his efforts (financial and time wise) developing his property "Restdown" at Risdon Cove. Eventually in 1818 and 1821, presumably in association with Geils' move to Scotland, his Tasmanian properties were offered for sale but apparently not selling at that time; eventually an offer for their purchase was made in 1832 by Thomas Gregson, an 1821 arrival in Hobart Town, briefly Tasmania's second Premier in 1857, and eventually a major landowner on the eastern shore of the Derwent (Gregson was also responsible for naming of the adjacent suburb "Lindisfarne"), with Geils Town Farm continuing to be leased out to other parties for his period of ownership and beyond.

==== Gregson era and later ====
Gregson's purchase of the Geils properties at "Geils Town" and Risdon went through and by 1838, Gregson's tenant in the present area appears to have been one John Price, who had arrived in Hobart in 1836. Price, who also had interests in a timber felling operation on the Huon River and was shortly to marry the Lieutenant-Governor's niece Mary Franklin, purchased land at Lindisfarne and appears to have been renting the Geilston Bay property: a portion of a letter of that year written by Jane Franklin, wife of the Governor reads "[Price] in the meantime commences building another [house] on his rented property, for which he is to have a suitable reduction in rent from his landlord Mr Gregson. He is cultivating the land and burning lime for which he has an easy market in Hobart Town." Price, who had a number of high ranking civil positions in Hobart over the next few years, resided in Tasmania until 1846 when he was appointed to the position of Civil Commandant of the Norfolk Island penal settlement; following his departure (or even in the years preceding it when he may have been busy with other duties), details of the operator of the quarry and/or the associated farm are not presently known.

Gregson lived on (mainly at Risdon) until 1874, however much of his property was offered for sale in 1867 (but apparently did not sell at that time), including "Lot 7: comprises about 51 acres, known as the LIME KILNS, which has supplied the town for upwards of 20 years. The lime obtained from this quarry is so well known that comment is unnecessary. The whole of the land, excepting the kiln, is under cultivation, and laid down in English grasses. It is situated on Geilstown [sic] Bay, with a large jetty, and convenience for shipping." Also offered was "Lot 8: comprises about 1515 acres, known as Geilstown." In February 1870, an advertisement in "The Tasmanian Times" announced: "To be let... the RISDON LIME KILNS and ADJOINING FARM, now and for some years past, let to Mr Keighley. The farm comprises 51 acres of good agricultural land fronting onto Geilstown Bay, and the quality of the lime stone is admitted to be excellent." After Gregson's death all of his remaining property in several locations including "'Lime Kiln' farm (formerly 'Geils Town' farm)", Restdown, and the rest was put up for sale by the mortgagees and appears to have been acquired by John Degraves of Cascades, Hobart who subsequently died in 1880. Degraves' property portfolio, described as "The Risdon Estate" of 6,860 acres in total, was offered for sale by auction in 1890, the relevant portion here being described as "the Limeworks and Farm at Gielston [sic] Bay".

==== Limestone quarry and lime works ====
The lime kilns described above, plus the associated quarry—variously described as sited at Geilston Bay, Risdon, and Beltana (a one time name for Lindisfarne)—had been operational since circa the 1830s (one uncorroborated source gives 1825) and exploited a significant deposit of freshwater limestone in the form known as travertine (sometimes given as "travertin" in older literature) which, according to modern geological maps, was located within a few hundred yards of the head of the Bay. E.M. Christensen and M.C. Jones state that the quarry and lime works were initially convict built and operated, although this has not currently been confirmed from other sources. The limestone rock was quarried from an elevated exposure and burned in the associated kiln or kilns to produce lime, a key ingredient in the mortar that was required for construction of the sandstone buildings of Hobart Town at that time. By 1890 it was reported that the lime output from the works to that time was valued at over £200,000, equivalent to almost £33 million in 2022 UK pounds. In 1843 the operator of the quarry was still Mr. Price; Christensen & Jones go on to state "... Somewhere around 1870 Mr George Albury bought the quarry. There was a good jetty at the head of the bay, and he had a twenty ton sailing craft to transport lime from the kilns for about ten years before the quarry was worked out. Early in 1890 a fresh deposit was discovered south of the house and Mr R. Boyle and Mr G. Stuart worked the kilns for another six years before the Denholms [later residents of the area, who lived by the quarry] came. ... The last operator of the kilns was a Mr Alf Cuthbertson, who sold out to the Electrolytic Zinc Company at the end of 1918." The Zinc Company's requirement was for unprocessed limestone, which was shipped straight across the river to its works at Lutana for use in their metallurgical processes, rather than for the lime product previously output from the kilns, so the latter fell into disrepair and were eventually abandoned.

The eventual cessation date for the quarry is not known exactly but was possibly in the 1920s. Several quarry pits remained (in a flooded state) until the late 1960s/early 1970s when they were filled in so that the area could be converted to playing fields associated with the construction of the new Geilston Bay High School, and can be seen in aerial photographs taken in the 1940s and 1960s (see "Gallery"). According to Christensen and Jones' account, the High School site also covered the remains of the disused lime kilns, which up till then had been "a favourite place for small children to go bird-nesting".

==== Later development ====
Probably from an early point in the twentieth century, an extensive apple orchard covered much of the flat area above the Bay (visible in the 1946 aerial photograph); this orchard, referred to as "de Bomford's Orchard" in correspondence of the time, was subsequently purchased by the Clarence Commission in 1954-5 for use as a community recreation area, to include a playing area for the soon to be formed Geilston Bay Tennis Club, which inaugurated in 1958. Little else has been discovered about the bearer of the name de Bomford, however the lane that currently extends from the East Derwent Highway down to the head of Geilston Bay through the recreation area currently bears that name ("Debomfords Lane"). Other small farms in the district also grew apples and apricots; a 1919 advertisement offers for sale "that very desirable residence and small farm at Geilston Bay, River Derwent, known as Woodberry, comprising 30 acres, of which portion is laid out as apricot and apple orchard, and about 5 acres in addition have been cleared. The remainder is light bush ... Good supply of water from two wells."

An alternative name, "Limekiln Bay" was sometimes used for the Bay through the second part of the nineteenth and first part of the twentieth centuries; as late as 1939 it could be found in use (presumably with readers expected to know its location) in a newspaper article, but has today disappeared from use. Yet another early name for the Bay was "James's Bay", found for example in this 1843 newspaper article which refers to "Mr. Price's limestone quarry in James's Bay", and other sources which equate James's Bay with the present Geilston Bay.

In 1921, a property named "Geilston Park", was offered for sale described as "comprising 1,078 acres, situated on Main Road from Lindisfarne to East Risdon", with "Improvements compris[ing] new brick dwelling and substantial outbuildings." It is not known who the seller was, or the successful purchaser, however a 1936 notice, also in the Mercury, warns "No Hunting or Shooting Allowed on Geilston Park. Trespassers prosecuted, dogs shot. E. H. Shone." Presumably the same property, by now substantially reduced in associated acreage, was offered for sale in 1940 as "Geilston Park", a "brick residence of 4 large main rooms ... together with a small cottage, 2-stall brick stable, and workshop", on a block of 41 acres of land, with a "long frontage on the Risdon Road and overlook[ing] Geilston Bay", following the 1939 death of its owner, one Ernest Alma Bellette, "Late of First Imperial Tasmanian Contingent, South Africa".

Following the closure of the lime kilns and eventually, the quarry, Geilston Bay appears to have reverted once again to a place of relatively quiet farming activity, separated by the River Derwent from the urban and industrial activities of its counterparts on the western shore. One activity of note did, however, take place from around 1939 for several years, when the Bay was used as an assembly point for the 24 floating concrete pontoons that were to be used as the unusual floating Hobart Bridge, which was in operation between 1943 and 1964 when it was replaced by its successor, the new (and conventional) Tasman Bridge. Probably not by coincidence, when the floating bridge was decommissioned in 1964, its concrete pontoons were once again towed to Geilston Bay where they remained floating for several years before eventual disposal (part of one is visible in the 1969 aerial photograph reproduced below, refer "Gallery").

The 1946 photograph shows that the area was largely undeveloped at that time, but was allocated for postwar housing from around the beginning of the 1950s and by the 1960s much of the suburb's present streetscape had been laid out and houses built and occupied. In 1967 the Geilston Bay Boat Club was formed and constructed slips, jetties and launching ramps at the head of the bay, as well as a succession of clubhouses.

By at least the late 1960s, another portion of the flat area near the East Derwent Highway was in use as the Lindisfarne Golf Course. Commencing in 1971, this site was reallocated for the construction of Geilston Bay High School which opened on 9 February 1972. The school operated as a high school for 41 years, however was closed in 2013 on account of falling enrolments. In 2014 the buildings were refurbished to provide a new and larger site for the Lindisfarne North Primary School, previously in north Lindisfarne, which then reopened on the Geilston Bay site in 2015.

In 2022, a purpose built building for the Tasmanian Archives was completed at Geilston Bay to encompass its stored collection, which was previously housed at Berriedale on Hobart's western shore.

Today Geilston Bay is a quiet, largely residential suburb. Road access to Hobart (via the East Derwent Highway) is similar to that of other northerly suburbs on the "Eastern Shore" such as its immediate neighbour to the south, Lindisfarne. Although it lacks the commercial activity, sometimes more grand housing stock and extensive downstream views of the River Derwent of its southern neighbour, residents—especially in the western portion—benefit from access to Natone Hill plus bushland between Geilston and Shag Bays for recreation, and other recreation facilities plus the waterside reserve centred around the Boat Club, as well as pleasing views of the small Bay which is typically filled with boats at anchor, while elsewhere in the suburb most homes have distant views of kunanyi / Mount Wellington. Three other bushland reserves, Thoona Bushland Reserve and Lindhill Bushland Reserve (both small) and the more extensive Pilchers Hill Reserve, are located in the eastern portion of the suburb and are maintained by Clarence City Council.

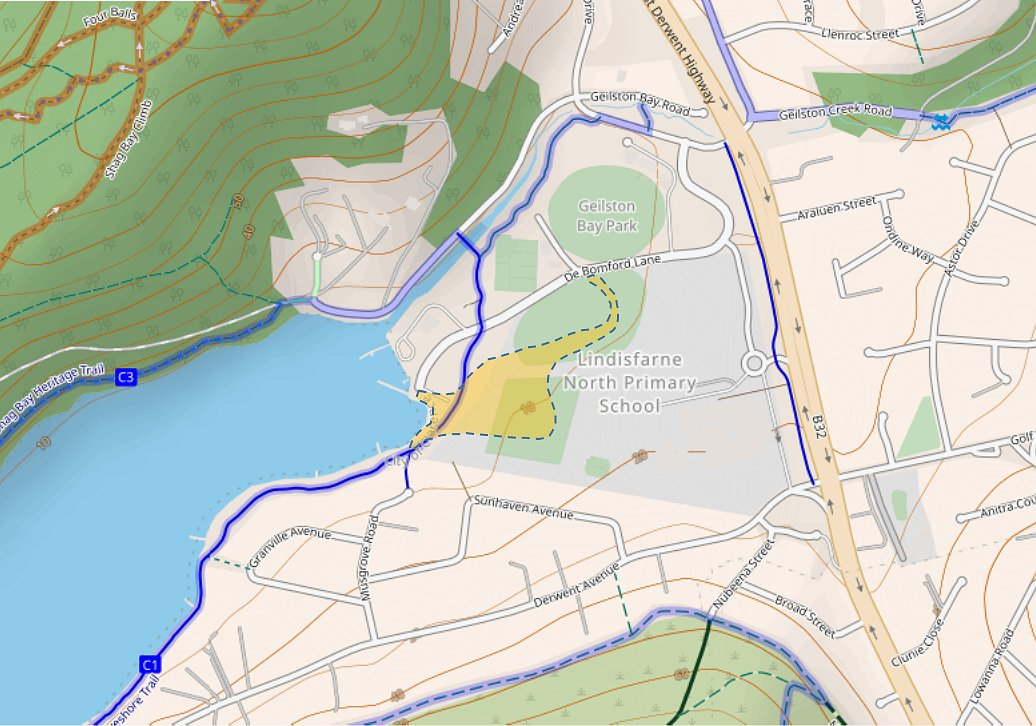
Geilston Bay, Tasmania: location of Travertine deposit (shown in gold) overlaid on 2022 street map

== Scientific importance ==
The "Geilston Bay Local Fauna" of Late Oligocene/Early Miocene age originates from the travertine deposit at Geilston Bay, now no longer in existence; in the nineteenth century the site provided specimens of fossil plants and a small number of animal bones. Fossil mammal remains at this site discovered by limestone quarrying activities in the 1860s were sent to the British Museum in London for further analysis, where they still reside; upon restudy in 1973-1975, the latter were announced as the earliest assemblage of fossil marsupials in Australia, although that distinction has subsequently passed to fossils of Eocene age from the Murgon fossil site. Today the travertine deposit is no longer visible, the site of the quarry workings now lying under the playing fields of the former Geilston Bay High School (see map plus aerial photographs reproduced below).

== Education ==
Lindisfarne North Primary school relocated in 2015 to the former Geilston Bay High School has Students (FTE) of 277.8 (as at 20 February 2015). A private Christian School (Kinder to year 12) also operates in the suburb.

== Local business ==
There is a local corner takeaway shop and general store, a butcher, a florist and pizza restaurant. Lindisfarne is nearby, which has a Woolworths supermarket.

The Clarence lifestyle retirement village is also located within the suburb.

== Sport and recreation ==
Many people exercise and walk their dogs on Natone Hill Bush reserve and on the walk to Shag Bay. The Geilston Bay tennis courts has six premium synthetic-grass courts securely enclosed and located in an attractive, protected setting. Nearby is a skate park and other recreational facilities. Geilston Bay has many sporting ovals operated by the City of Clarence and Lindisfarne North Primary School. The OHA Football Club competes in the Old Scholars Football Association during winter. The Montagu Bay Cricket Club competes in the Kookaburra Southern Cricket Association during the summer.

In the past 30 years, the suburb has become more urbanised as property developments take place, with the resulting loss of surrounding bushland and extending the suburb towards Risdon Vale.

== Smelter contamination ==
Operating since 1917, the Risdon Zinc Works (trading as Nyrstar Hobart) at nearby Lutana, continues to produce heavy metal contaminants affecting the air, land and estuary waters surrounding Greater Hobart.

In the 1980s, top soil samples from Lutana, Geilston Bay and Lindisfarne revealed high concentrations of zinc, lead, and cadmium. The sampling also revealed that the prevailing wind directions, the terrain of the land, and proximity to the smelter had an impact on the contamination's dissemination pattern.

Early to mid-1990s soil sampling around Lutana and the eastern shore revealed that increased levels of cadmium, lead, and zinc were confined to the top 50 millimetres (2.0 in) of the soil profile, with the bulk concentrated in the top 20 millimetres (0.79 in).

A 2009 report conducted by the CSIRO recommended that home-grown vegetables vulnerable to the uptake of heavy metals including lettuce, spinach, carrot and beetroot should be grown in raised garden beds with a minimum depth of 30 centimetres (12 in) clean soil.

Drawing from data complied in the National Pollutant Inventory, a report by the Australian Conservation Foundation placed Hobart at number 6 of Australia's most polluted cities in 2018. The data identified medium levels of air pollution in postcodes 7009 (Lutana, Derwent Park, Moonah, West Moonah), 7010 (Glenorchy, Rosetta, Montrose, Goodwood, Dowsing Point) and 7015 (Lindisfarne, Geilston Bay, Rose Bay) with average air contaminate readings of 40% NO_{x} (nitric oxide (NO) and nitrogen dioxide (NO_{2})), and sulfur dioxide (SO_{2}) contributing 57% of airborne emissions.

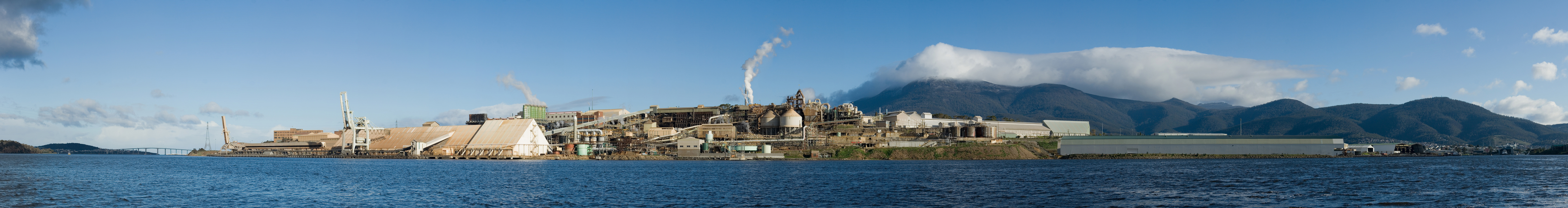
The zinc works at Lutana is the largest exporter in Tasmania, generating 2.5% of the state's Gross Domestic Product. It produces over 280,000 tons of zinc per year.

== Notable people ==
- Colonel Andrew Geils – Commandant of Tasmania 1812-1813
- Marie Bjelke Petersen - novelist and physical culture teacher. Her last house in Australia, "Moon Gate", was in Geilston Bay.
- Cheryl Margaret Wilson (OAM 2004), Geilston Bay, Tasmania, for service to the Guiding movement in Tasmania, and to junior athletics.
- Joshua Brennan – triple j breakfast producer

== Gallery ==
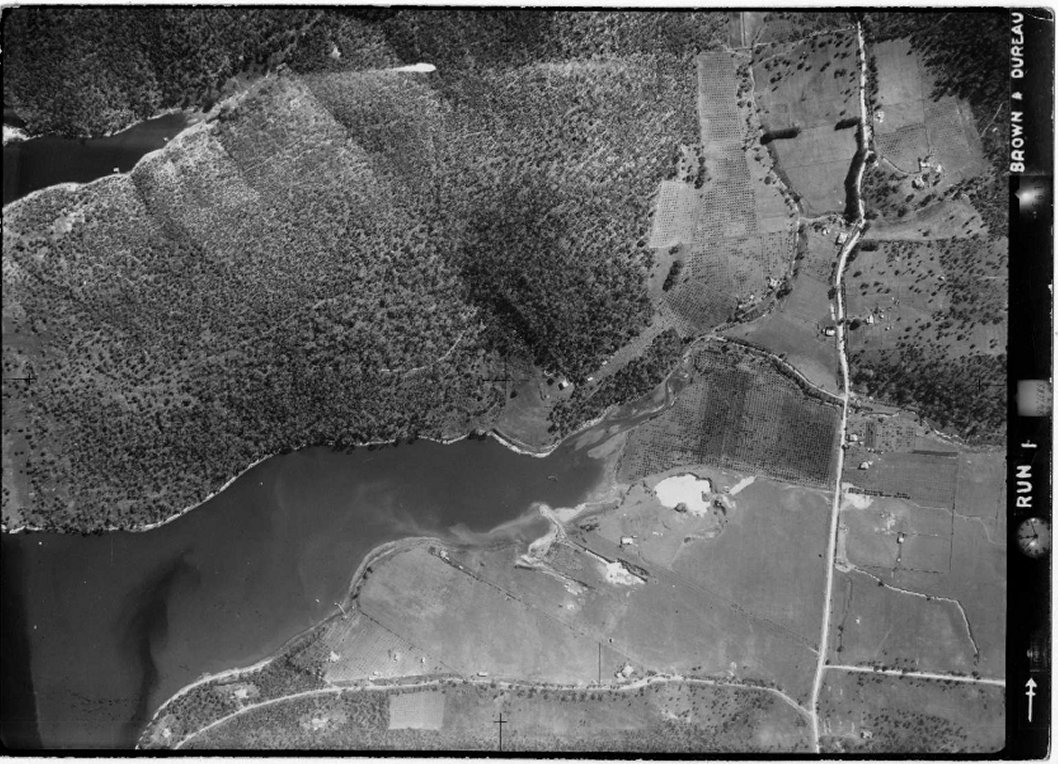
Geilston Bay, Tasmania, aerial photograph 26 Mar 1946. Note the overall lack of development, with the orchard (right of centre) and flooded former limestone quarry workings below.

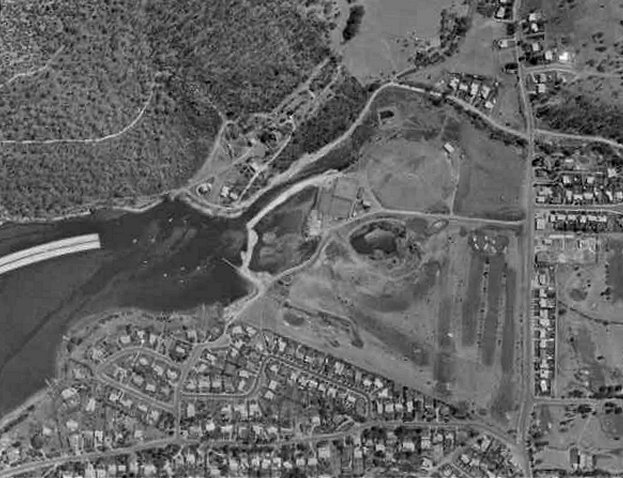
Geilston Bay, Tasmania, aerial photograph 24 Jan 1969. Note that development has now occurred on the southern flank of the Bay. The curved white object is a portion of the arch of the former Hobart floating bridge, in storage pending its removal, following the opening of its replacement, the Tasman Bridge, which opened in August 1964. The central, undeveloped area is now occupied by, among others, the Boat Club buildings and the Lindisfarne Golf Course, while the former quarry workings are still visible.

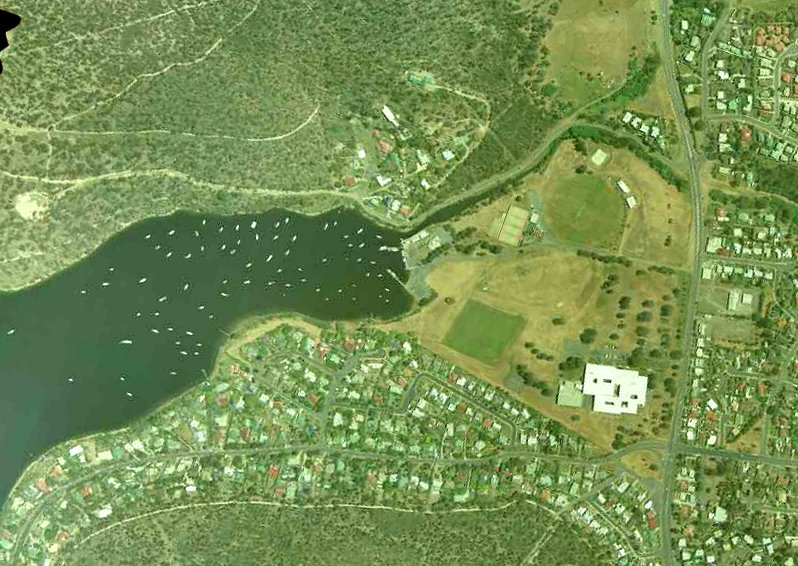
Geilston Bay, Tasmania, aerial photograph 27 Nov 2002. The Lindisfarne Golf Course site is now occupied by buildings of the Geilston Bay High School (constructed 1971-2) and its playing fields cover the area where the former quarry used to be.
