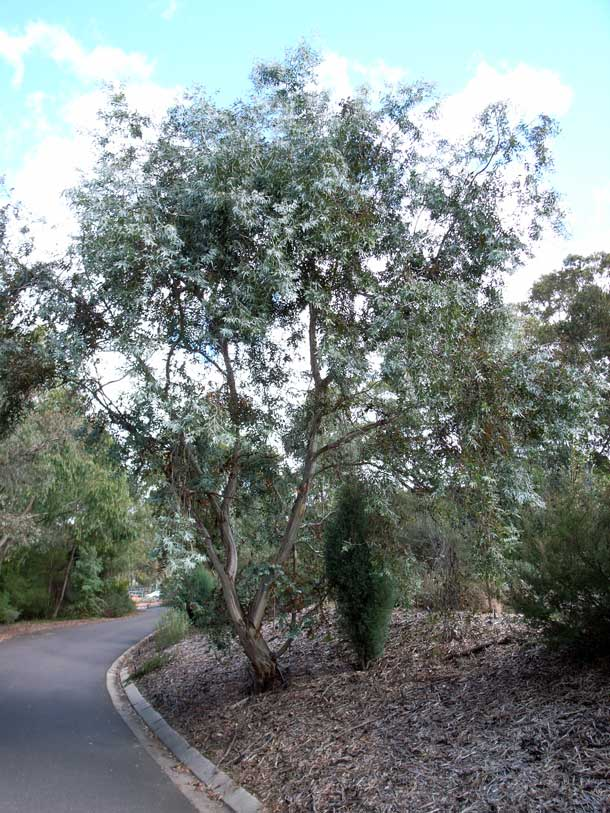
- Eucalyptus risdonii in the ANBG

Conservation status
- Vulnerable (IUCN 3.1)

Scientific classification
- Kingdom: Plantae
- Clade: Tracheophytes
- Clade: Angiosperms
- Clade: Eudicots
- Clade: Rosids
- Order: Myrtales
- Family: Myrtaceae
- Genus: Eucalyptus
- Species: E. risdonii

Binomial name
- Eucalyptus risdonii Hook.f

Synonyms
- Eucalyptus hypericifolia Grimwade nom. inval., pro syn.; Eucalyptus risdoni Hook.f. orth. var.; Eucalyptus risdonii Hook.f. var. risdonii

= Eucalyptus risdonii =

Risdon peppermint

Species of tree

Eucalyptus risdonii, commonly known as the Risdon peppermint, is a species of small tree that is endemic to the Meehan Range within Greater Hobart and Mangalore in Tasmania, Australia. It has smooth bark, a crown composed mostly of sessile, glaucous, egg-shaped juvenile leaves arranged in opposite pairs. The flower buds are arranged in groups of between nine and fifteen and the fruit are cup-shaped, conical or hemispherical.

== Description ==
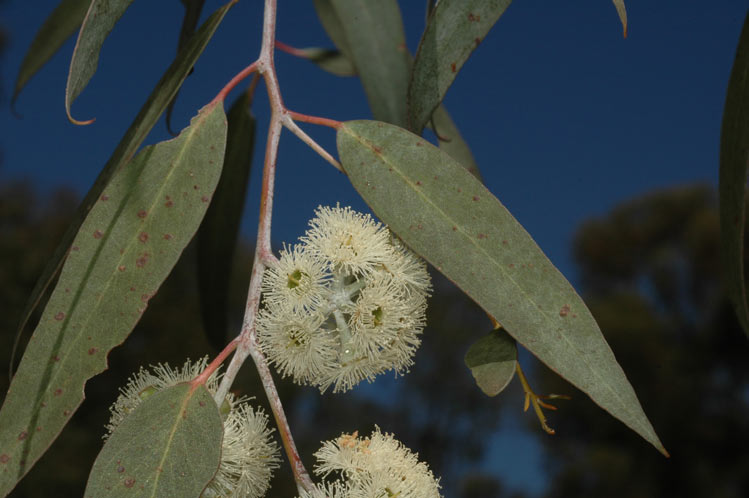
Flowers

Eucalyptus risdonii is a tree that typically grows to a height of 8 m (26 ft) and forms a lignotuber.

The bark is smooth, grey, yellow, white or cream-coloured. Young plants and coppice regrowth have glaucous, sessile, egg-shaped leaves arranged in opposite pairs with their bases joined, 20–50 mm (0.79–1.97 in) long and wide. The crown is composed mostly of juvenile leaves. Adult leaves, when formed, are arranged alternately, dull green, lance-shaped, up to 100 mm (3.9 in) long and 20 mm (0.79 in) wide.

The flower buds are arranged in leaf axils, on an unbranched peduncle 5–25 mm (0.20–0.98 in) long, the individual buds on pedicels 2–5 mm (0.079–0.197 in) long. Mature buds are oval to club-shaped, 4–7 mm (0.16–0.28 in) long and 3–5 mm (0.12–0.20 in) wide with a rounded to flattened operculum. Flowering occurs from November to January and the flowers are white.

The fruit is a woody cup-shaped, conical or hemispherical capsule 6–10 mm (0.24–0.39 in) long and 6–9 mm (0.24–0.35 in) wide with the valves below rim level.

== Taxonomy and naming ==
Eucalyptus risdonii was first formally described in 1847 by Joseph Dalton Hooker in the London Journal of Botany. The specific epithet (risdonii) refers to the locality Risdon, where the type specimen was found.

== Distribution and habitat ==
The Risdon peppermint is only known from the dry slopes on the eastern side of the River Derwent within the Meehan Range near Risdon, Grasstree Hill and Mangalore in Tasmania, Australia. It grows in low, open forest on sunny, north-west facing ridges.

This species is reported to be a juvenilised form of its sister species, E. tenuiramis.

== Conservation status ==
This species is classed as "rare" under the Tasmanian Government Threatened Species Protection Act 1995. The IUCN Red List assesses the species as Vulnerable.
