= James O'Neil =

James or Jim O'Neil may refer to:

- James A. O'Neil (1800–1874), American businessman and politician
- James E. O'Neil, American lawyer and politician in Rhode Island
- Jim O'Neil (ice hockey) (1913–1997), Canadian professional ice hockey player
- Jim O'Neil (American football), American football defensive coordinator
- James O'Neil, American political candidate; see New Hampshire state elections, 2004

== See also ==
- James O'Neill (disambiguation)
- Jimmy O'Neill (disambiguation)
- James O'Neal (disambiguation)
- Jim O'Neill (disambiguation)
- James Neal (disambiguation)
