= James O'Neal (disambiguation) =

James O'Neal may refer to:

- James O'Neal, pen name of James O. Born, American novelist
- James Oneal (1875–1962), founding member of the Socialist Party of America
- James O'Neal, American mariner, captain of City of St. Louis; see Anchor Line (riverboat company)

== See also ==
- James O'Neill (disambiguation)
- James O'Neil (disambiguation)
- Jimmy O'Neill (disambiguation)
- Jim O'Neill (disambiguation)
- James Neal (disambiguation)
