= Jimmy O'Neill =

Jimmy O'Neill may refer to:

- Jimmy O'Neill (footballer, born 1931) (1931–2007), Irish international football goalkeeper who played for Everton, Stoke City, Darlington and Port Vale
- Jimmy O'Neill (footballer, born 1941), Northern Irish footballer who played for Sunderland and Northern Ireland
- Jimmy O'Neill (DJ) (1940–2013), American DJ; hosted Shindig!
- Jimmy O'Neal (American contemporary artist, born 1967)

== See also ==
- Jimmie O'Neill
- James O'Neill (disambiguation)
- James O'Neil (disambiguation)
- James O'Neal (disambiguation)
- Jim O'Neill (disambiguation)
- James Neal (disambiguation)
