= Campbell Street Gaol =

Former prison in Hobart, Tasmania, Australia

H.M. Gaol Hobart (informally Campbell Street Gaol)
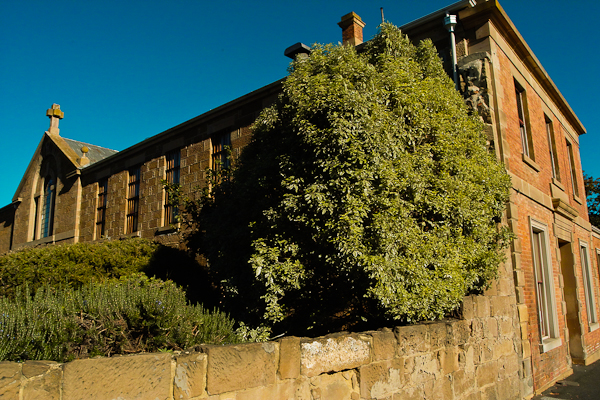
- Part of the remains of the Campbell Street Gaol
- Interactive map of H.M. Gaol Hobart (informally Campbell Street Gaol)
- Location: Hobart, Tasmania; 42.8774°S 147.3270°E
- Status: Historic site
- Security class: Maximum (males and females)
- Capacity: 1,200
- Opened: 1821
- Closed: November 1960 (males); 1963 (females)
- Managed by: National Trust of Australia (as 'The Tench' – Penitentiary Chapel Historic Site)
- Website: www.nationaltrust.org.au/tas/TheTench/

H.M. Gaol Hobart or Campbell Street Gaol, a former Australian maximum security prison for males and females, was located in Hobart, Tasmania. Built by convict labour, the jail operated between 1821 until the early 1960s. In 1961, male inmates were transferred to the H.M. Risdon Prison and in 1963, female inmates were transferred to the Risdon Women's Prison.

Designed in the Georgian Renaissance architectural style by John Lee Archer, what remains of the jail is now managed by the National Trust of Australia (Tasmania) as a historic site.

== Colonial history ==
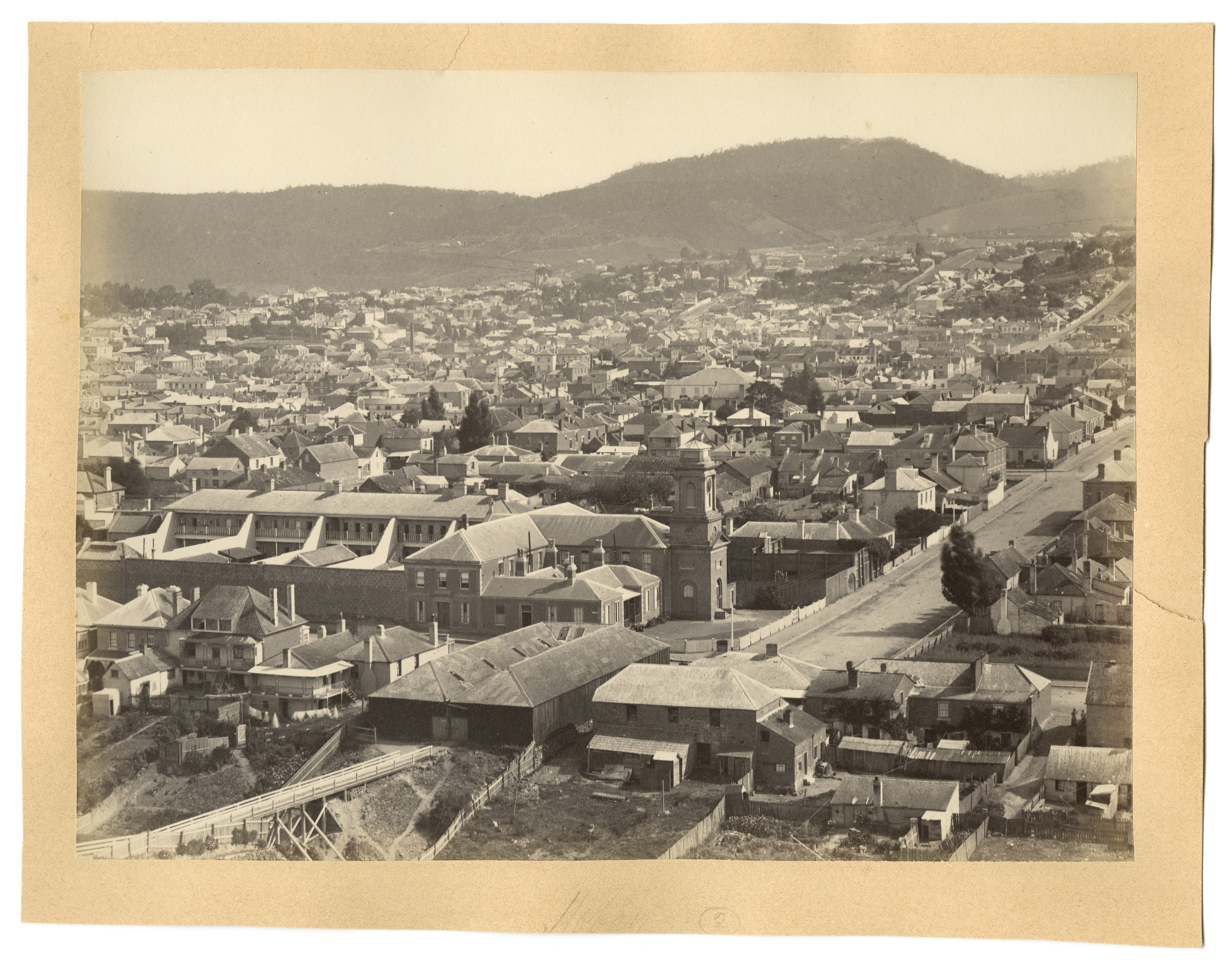
1860s photograph of Hobart's Campbell Street Gaol and early Hobart

The original portion of the jail, at first known as the Hobart Town Prisoner's Barracks, was built by convicts in 1821 and accommodated 640 men. As thousands of convicts were arriving each year, the barracks was found to be too small almost immediately, and it was extended in stages over the next decade until it could hold over 1,200 men, by using every inch of available space, including the ceiling cavity. Used progressively as a civilian prison from 1846, it became Hobart's prison after convict transportation ended in 1853, as the Hobart Town Gaol, replacing an older building of that name in Murray Street which had become structurally unsound. A new cell-block was constructed to the north of the original one, and the jail remained more or less in this form until its closure.

Found to be too old and small in the late 1940s, movement of the inmates to the new Risdon Prison began on 25 November 1960. Campbell Street Gaol closed in 1963, and all the buildings on site were demolished except the court rooms. These remained in use until 1983, when they too were replaced as courts by new buildings in Salamanca Place. These older buildings in Campbell Street remained standing and were given over to the care of the National Trust, and they are open to the public. Of the rest of the former jail, only fragments of the outer wall remain standing today, and are visible along the length of Campbell Street where the jail formerly stood.

The Campbell Street Gaol was one of three prisons in Tasmania where executions could be carried out. A total of 32 people, including one woman, were executed at the jail between 1857 and 1946, when the last hanging in Tasmania took place. The scaffold is accessible as part of the guided tours.

The jail never had toilets installed in its cells, just slop buckets.

== Recent history ==
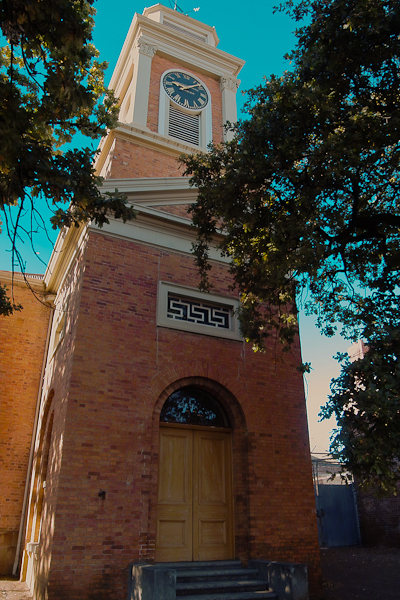
The Penitentiary Chapel, located within the Campbell Street Gaol, designed by John Lee Archer.

In the first half of the 20th century, Campbell Street Gaol was the subject of six separate inquiries, all concluding it desperately needed to be modernised and conditions upgraded.

In 1916, a Parliamentary Standing Committee on Public Works inquired into the need for major remodelling of the Gaol, instead recommending the building of a new jail. A lesser sum was provided to make temporary alterations to address the worst deficiencies. Cell accommodation was concentrated in the northern wing, leaving the southern section (dating from 1813) for administration purposes. Work carried out in 1916 included improvements to the drainage by connection of the jail (but not the cells) to the sewerage system and the conversion of lighting from gas to electricity. Other services for kitchen and workshops continued to be provided by a wood-fired boiler and wood fired ovens. Some cells were considered to have insufficient light and were so small as to only permit room for a bed. The Governor of the day reported that he was much heartened by the alterations in which groups of two small cells were converted into new single cells, which made it more humane and convenient to keep prisoners locked in their cells over weekends and holidays.

A Royal Commission into shortcomings in the prison system took place in 1935, but the report was never printed and all trace has been lost. This was followed in the same year by an enquiry by the Parliamentary Standing Committee on Public Works. At that stage the jail had accommodation for 142 inmates. One of the recommendations of the Standing Committee was to replace the jail with a modern facility to replace the deplorable conditions in Campbell Street. Part of the consideration was to remove the jail to the country "but not more distant than 30 miles" and that it should be suitable for farming by the less dangerous prisoners, which would also render the system self-sufficient in meat, vegetables, dairy produce and fuel. A property was eventually selected in 1937 at Hayes, which became the Hayes Prison Farm. The idea of transferring all of the prison operations to Hayes was subsequently abandoned.

Following a Royal Commission in 1943, resulting from a series of escapes from Campbell Street Gaol, a property was finally obtained by compulsory acquisition in 1949. The area of 90 acres (36 ha) acquired was on the eastern side of the Derwent River, not far from Risdon Cove where the initial European settlement of Tasmania occurred. The 1943 Royal Commission also heard that the southern section of the Campbell Street Gaol was still in use as cells including four solitary confinement dark cells. However it would be ten years before the much anticipated and long overdue Risdon Prison was opened in 1960.

== Notable inmates ==
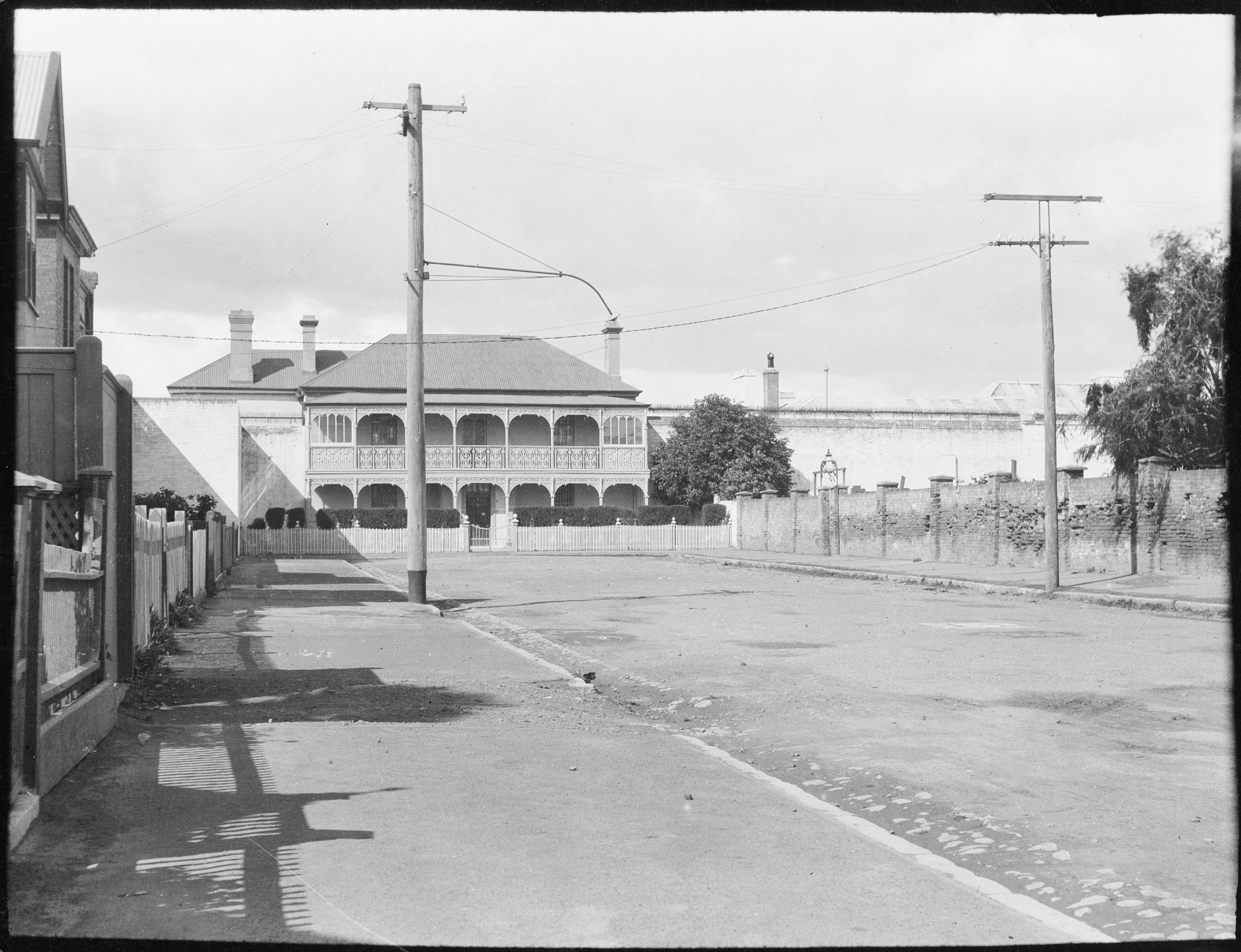
Residence of the Governor of the Hobart Gaol, at the end of Melville Street, known colloquially as Martin's Mistake. (c.1905)

The jail had many notable inmates, including Margaret Coghlin, the last woman executed in Tasmania. The bushranger Martin Cash was briefly held in Campbell Street Gaol after being captured nearby. Running from the nearby Old Commodore Inn in Brisbane Street, Cash ran down Argyle Street and turned into Melville Street trying to get to the Domain and escape. However the street was a dead end, blocked by the jail and the Prison Governor's residence. A gunfight ensued and Cash was captured. Until the demolition of the jail and the extension of Melville Street, this part of Melville Street became known locally as 'Martin's Mistake'.

== Current use ==
Parts of the jail and associated buildings were designed under the supervision of John Lee Archer, an Irish born engineer and architect who served as Civil Engineer in Van Diemen's Land between 1827 and 1838. All that remains of the site are a small group of buildings on the corner of Campbell and Brisbane Streets and the base of a remnant of the high sandstone wall that once enclosed the jail on the Campbell Street side. The complex consists of a church, built between 1831 and 1833 over solitary confinement cells. The church was then converted to a prison chapel and law courts in the late 1850s. Today this complex is known as the Penitentiary Chapel Historic Site.

The scaffold for hanging was restored in the 1980s, and uses the original fixtures.
