= James Neill =

James Neill may refer to:

- James Neill (actor) (1860–1931), American actor
- James George Smith Neill (1810–1857), Scottish military officer of the East India Company
- James C. Neill (1788–1848), American soldier and politician
- James Kerby Neill (1906–1996), professor of English
- Sir James Hugh Neill (1921–2017), British businessman, public servant, and British Army officer

== See also ==
- James Neil (born 1968), American rower
- James Neal (disambiguation)
- James O'Neill (disambiguation)
