= Master (judiciary) =

Judicial officer in common law jurisdictions

A master (called an associate judge in some jurisdictions) is a judicial officer of limited jurisdiction in superior courts in common law jurisdictions. The office originated in the courts of England and Wales and has been adopted in courts in numerous other countries. A master's jurisdiction is generally confined to civil proceedings and is a subset of that of a superior court judge or justice. Masters are typically involved in hearing specialized types of trials, case management, and in some jurisdictions dispute resolution or adjudication of specific issues referred by judges.

Masters may be found in the courts of Australia, England and Wales, Fiji, Hong Kong, Ireland, and several Caribbean countries. Several state courts in the United States utilize masters or similar officers and also make extensive use of special masters.

In some countries, the office of master has been renamed to associate judge. This has occurred in several Australian states, many Canadian courts, and in New Zealand.

== Canada ==
In Canada, associate judges are found in both the federal and the provincial court systems.

=== Federal courts ===
The Federal Court and the Tax Court of Canada both have associate judges. The associate judges of the Federal Court were called prothonotaries until 2022. The position of associate judges at the Tax Court was created in 2022.

=== Provincial courts ===
The structure of the court system is primarily a provincial responsibility pursuant to s. 92 (14) of the Constitution Act, 1867 and the superior courts of the provinces have different names. Masters are found in the Supreme Court of British Columbia, Court of King's Bench of Alberta, and the Court of King's Bench of Manitoba. There are part-time taxing masters in the Supreme Court of Newfoundland and Labrador. There is a similar office of prothonotary in the Supreme Court of Prince Edward Island. In September 2021, the Ontario Superior Court of Justice changed the title of "case management master" to "associate judge". In January 2024, the government of British Columbia renamed "master" to "associate judge".

The jurisdiction of a Master is fixed by provincial statute and the rules of court. Masters are appointed by the provincial government. As a result, while Masters sit in a superior court, they do not have the inherent jurisdiction of the judges of those courts, who are appointed by the federal government and whose authority is derived from the Constitution of Canada. Their jurisdiction is usually limited to procedural and Interlocutory matters heard in chambers. Consequently, though of the superior court, Masters are concurrently subordinate to the judges of that court insofar as application of judicial precedent is concerned. Masters commonly also sit as Registrars in Bankruptcy.

Traditionally a Master is referred to as "Master Smith" or, in court, as "Master". In some jurisdictions, Masters or associate judges are now referred to as "your honour".

Masters and Prothonotaries are independent judicial officers although they do not have the full level of security of tenure afforded to federally appointed judges.

In Alberta, British Columbia and Manitoba, masters have the same terms of appointment as provincial judges. This was formerly the case in Ontario as well but after the High Court of Justice and District Courts were merged, in 1986 a new office of Case Management Master was created.

In Ontario, associate judges have all of the authority of traditional masters as well as additional jurisdiction to manage actions and engage in dispute resolution processes. They are appointed by Order in Council and can only be removed for cause by the Chief Justice following a formal disciplinary process.

In Ontario the distinction between "chambers" and "court" has been abolished. When associate judges preside they sit as the court and their function is to perform tasks that would otherwise fall to superior court judges. Besides the jurisdiction to hear most interlocutory motions in civil matters, associate judges in Ontario also preside at status hearings, case conferences and pre-trials. They frequently act as referees to hear trials in construction lien matters, mortgage references or issues referred by judges. Associate judges also provide dispute resolution services and sit as Registrars in Bankruptcy.

== England and Wales ==
In England and Wales a master is a judge in the Chancery and King's Bench Divisions of the High Court exercising jurisdiction in civil matters. When the master presides over a matter within her or his jurisdiction, the decision of the master has the same effect as a decision of a Justice of the High Court within the division of the court to which the master is appointed. The role of a master in the High Court of Justice of England and Wales is concerned primarily with trial and case management of High Court civil claims in London excluding committals to prison, judicial review and criminal cases. There are masters in the King's Bench Division, Chancery Division and the Senior Courts Costs Office (Taxing Masters/Costs Judges) and their roles differ slightly.

Such a person is addressed in court as Judge. In all other forms of correspondence, they should be addressed as 'Master Smith' whether the master is male or female. A similar type of master exists in the Court system of Northern Ireland, in several Canadian and Australian jurisdictions as well as in other countries whose court system is based on that of England.

The office of master is of ancient origins dating from at least the 12th century, though masters in Chancery were abolished in the 19th century and a new office of Chancery Master was recreated later. There are masters in the Chancery and King's Bench Divisions of the High Court of Justice and the Senior Courts Costs Office of the High Court. The Senior Master of the King's Bench Division also bears the title of King's Remembrancer which is the oldest continuous judicial office in England.

In the Inns of Court, the members of the governing body are known as "Masters of the Bench" or, more commonly, "benchers". In the context of the functions they perform in that capacity (but not otherwise) they will be known as, for example, "Master Smith" (whether they are male or female). This will be so even if in other contexts they use a higher title: hence, a High Court Judge who is a Master of the Bench will be known in his or her Inn as "Master Smith", in private life as Sir John Smith, and on the bench as Mr Justice Smith; likewise a law lord will be known in the inn as "Master Woolf" even if he is privately and professionally known by the peerage title of "Lord Woolf".

== Hong Kong ==
The High Court's Registrar, Senior Deputy Registrars and Deputy Registrars serve as Masters of the High Court in civil cases in the court's Court of First Instance. They exercise part of a High Court judge's case management powers.

== Republic of Ireland ==
Under the Court Officers Act 1926, the Master of the High Court and taxing masters are not judges but rather "quasi-judicial office holders".

== New Zealand ==
In the High Court of New Zealand, associate judges perform the same role as masters in the High Court of Justice in England and Wales. They were previously referred to as masters, however the title was changed on 20 May 2004, and all existing masters were renamed associate judges.

== Fiji ==
The masters are the junior judges on the High Court of Fiji.

== See also ==
- Special master
- Registrar (law)
