= Knights of Saint Columbanus =

Irish fraternal organization

- Ridirí Naomh Cholumba
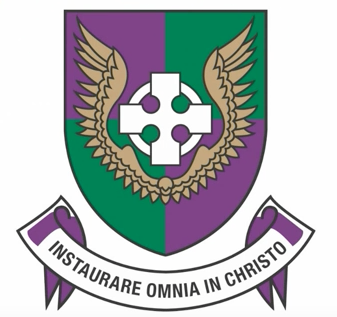
- Crest of the Knights of St Columbanus

- Area served by the Knights of St Columbanus
- Abbreviation: KOSC
- Named after: Saint Columbanus
- Formation: 10 April 1915; 111 years ago
- Founder: Canon James Kearney O'Neill
- Founded at: Belfast
- Type: Catholic fraternal organisation
- Purpose: Charity, Unity, Fraternity
- Headquarters: Ely House, Ely Place, Dublin
- Coordinates: 53.337500°N 6.253822°W
- Region served: Island of Ireland
- Motto: Instaurare omnia in Christo (Restore all things in Christ)
- Supreme Knight: Brendan McCann
- Supreme Chaplain: Father Brendan Kilcoyne
- Affiliations: International Alliance of Catholic Knights
- Website: knightsofcolumbanus.ie

The Order of the Knights of Saint Columbanus (Irish: Ridirí Naomh Cholumba) is an Irish national Catholic fraternal organisation. Founded by Canon James K. O'Neill in Belfast, Northern Ireland in 1915 (then the whole island was part of the UK), it was named in honour of the Irish saint Columbanus. Initially established as a mutual benefit society for working class Catholics, it has developed into a fraternal benefit society dedicated to providing charitable services to all areas of the Irish community.

There are 68 councils across all 32 counties on the island of Ireland. Membership in the order is open to all practising Catholic men and their families aged 18 and over. There is a youth division of the order open to younger men ages 16 and up called the Associate Knights of St Columbanus. The Order is a founding member of the International Alliance of Catholic Knights.

Widely described as a secret society, the organisation rejects this assertion. The Knights of St. Columbanus has also had influence in government, business and trade unions. It has been described in Church, State and Social Science in Ireland as "the Irish organisation most durably associated with combating Catholic economic subordination," as it sought, after formation, to break through the hegemony of a Protestant minority in public institutions and commerce. It is headquartered at a Georgian clubhouse in Ely Place, Dublin.

== History ==
=== Formation ===
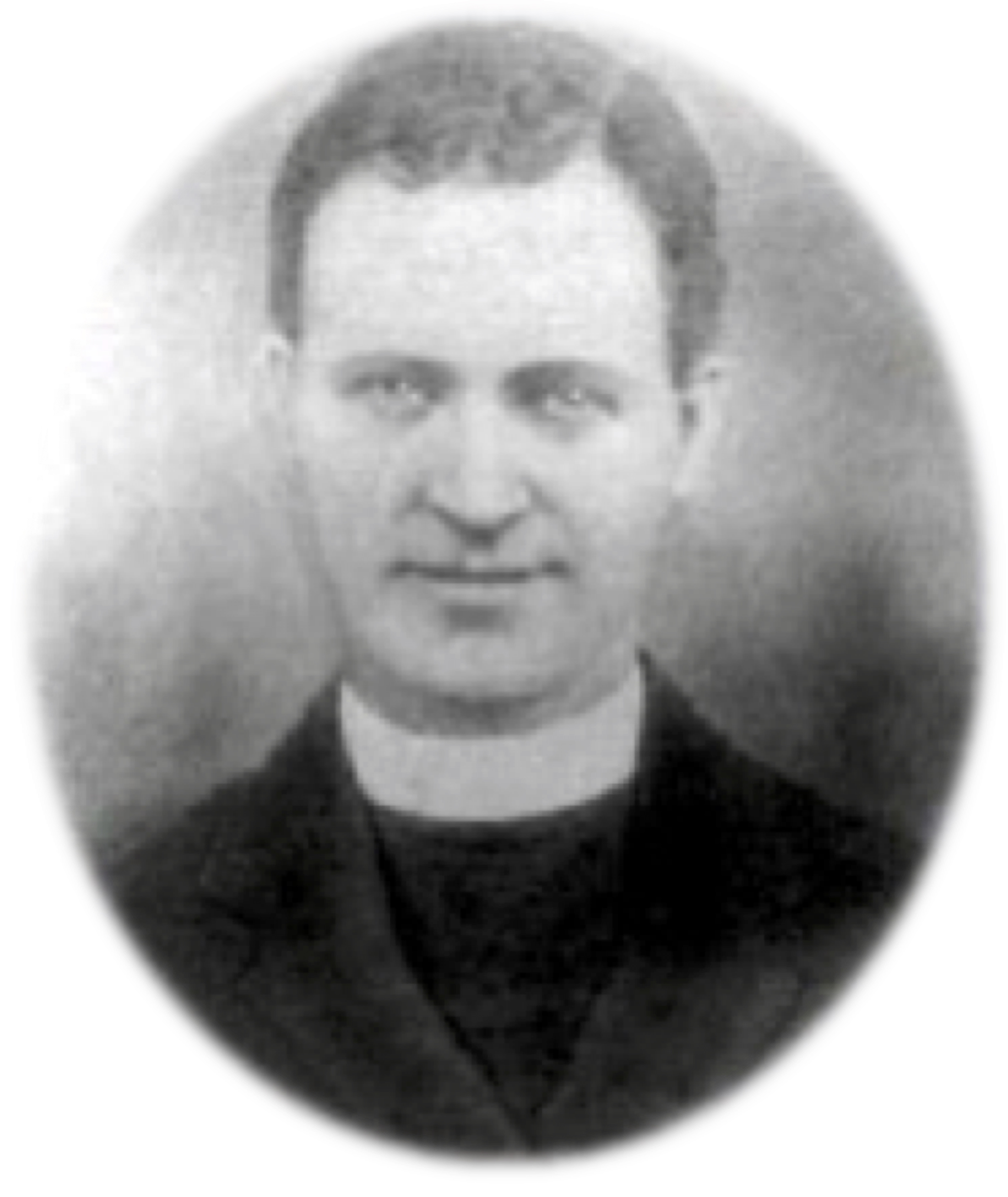
Canon James Kearney O'Neill, founder of the Knights of St Columbanus

Fr. James Kearney O'Neill, of Ballycastle, County Antrim, founded the Order of the Knights of St Columbanus in 1915 "to cherish fraternal charity and to develop practical Catholicity among its members, to promote and foster the cause of the Catholic faith and Catholic education".

O'Neill was influenced heavily by social teachings of the Church, in particular the Papal encyclical Rerum Novarum. This key encyclical, issued by Pope Leo XIII in 1891, addressed the exploitation of industrial workers and encouraged membership in labour unions, while rejecting the extreme solutions offered by both socialism and laissez faire capitalism. O'Neill witnessed such injustices first-hand in his role as parish priest of Sacred Heart Parish in industrialized, turn of the century Belfast. By 1920, following the Partition of Ireland, events such as the shipyard expulsions in East Belfast, where Catholic workers were forcibly removed from the yards, began a two-year spate of attacks, predominantly affecting Catholic civilians in the city. Estimates suggest that between 1920 and 1922, over 500 people lost their lives with 1,100 people injured and 650 homes and businesses destroyed. Catholics hanged in effigy from buildings were also seen during this time. These events are widely known as the 'Belfast Pogroms'. Additionally, all local government representatives were from Protestant, unionist backgrounds at this time, therefore the needs of the Catholic nationalist population could not be addressed. In the face of these situations, an organisation which sought to serve the Catholic population in Belfast was direly needed.

Working with Bishop John Tohill, O'Neill arranged regular meetings at which the social teachings of Pope Leo XIII and Pope Pius X were discussed. This marked the beginning of the order as it is known today, by educating its members in social principles which can be applied to practical, real-life situations.

The order was placed under the patronage of St Columbanus for his missionary zeal in bringing the Good News to all, in addition to infamously standing up for what's right in the face of adversity, an issue faced by many of the early Knights.

The motto ‘Instaurare omnia in Christo’ meaning ‘To restore all things in Christ’ comes from Pope Pius X. As a keen follower of the pontiff, O’Neill adopted the same motto to which Pius X dedicated his pontificate in his first encyclical E Supremi. In it, the dire need for Catholic action on the topics of education, respect for property, maintaining order, and justice in the social classes was expressed.

The Order was first announced in The Irish Catholic on 10 April 1915. An order with similar views and motives to the Knights of St Columbanus, known as the Columban Knights, was merged with the KSC. Over a year later, four new primary councils had been established in Belfast with more following in Armagh, Cork, Derry, Dublin, Lurgan, Newry and Portadown. It is thought that these councils spread throughout the country through travelling businessmen associated with the Order.

To accomplish their goals, they maintained strict secrecy around their membership. Individuals identified one another through confidential passwords and distinctive handshakes. While the necessity for such secrecy faded in the South after 1921, it persisted in the North. The unified organisation morphed into a form of Catholic equivalent to Freemasonry. The ceremonial robes worn by its officers during meetings represented the order's authority and secretive nature.

Canon O'Neill died on 18 March 1922 and is buried at St Patrick's Church, Ballyvoy, County Antrim. The Order celebrates an annual Mass at the church in his honour. It is attended by Knights from all counties on the island of Ireland.

In the mid-20th century, the organisation was involved in a movement of campaigns against moneylending. The emergence of hire purchase in Ireland was predominantly linked to equipping newly-formed households, and a 1946 report by the Knights of Columbanus highlighted that the absence of thrift among the youth, inadequate wages, and the lack of family allowances within the prevailing wage structure had compelled young couples beginning married life to acquire goods through the hire purchase system. The organisation expressed fears over the absence of legal safeguards for buyers, noting the financial strain this placed on impoverished Catholic families. However, it has also been noted that rhetoric in such campaigns carried an anti-Semitic undertone, as many moneylenders, predominantly legal, were Jewish.

Between 1966 and 1969, as the supreme knight of the Knights of Columbanus, Vincent Grogan (a barrister and philanthropist) embraced a prominent public role, aiming to demystify the organisation by inviting non-members to attend its annual gatherings and abandoning the ceremonial robes traditionally worn at formal events. His progressive changes met with fierce resistance from traditionalists, creating significant friction within the order. Rather than diffusing the discord, Grogan heightened it by openly criticising Catholic Church authorities for their secrecy and reluctance to engage with the Knights. This confrontational approach reached its peak when he publicly criticised Archbishop John Charles McQuaid on television. In a frank radio interview, he acknowledged that some members exploited the order for personal gain, to advocate for censorship, and to shape government policy in line with Catholic ideals. However, he also argued that such opportunism was not unique to the Knights, but reflected broader tendencies within Irish society. Grogan’s background as a barrister equipped him with strong communication skills, allowing him to handle media scrutiny with composure and charm during challenging interviews.

In a 1967 feature by RTÉ, the Knights are depicted as an organisation that was committed to opposing Communism, while simultaneously striving to achieve a Catholic conception of social justice for impoverished Catholics. Grogan remarked that their attitudes reflected the majority view of the laity in Ireland. Despite instigating change in the organisation, Grogan nonetheless remarked that "we are conservative."

He leveraged the order as a platform to advance his philanthropic goals, championing causes related to social responsibility and the wellbeing of various marginalised groups, including emigrants, the impoverished, the travelling community, former prisoners, orphans, and the unemployed. His recurring message to the Knights, a notable departure from past practices, was clear: “let the Irish people know what you are doing or trying to do.” A vocal advocate for the reforms of the Second Vatican Council, he encouraged Catholics to embody Christian principles in everyday life and played a key role in founding the Irish Council of the Laity in 1968.

=== In Politics ===
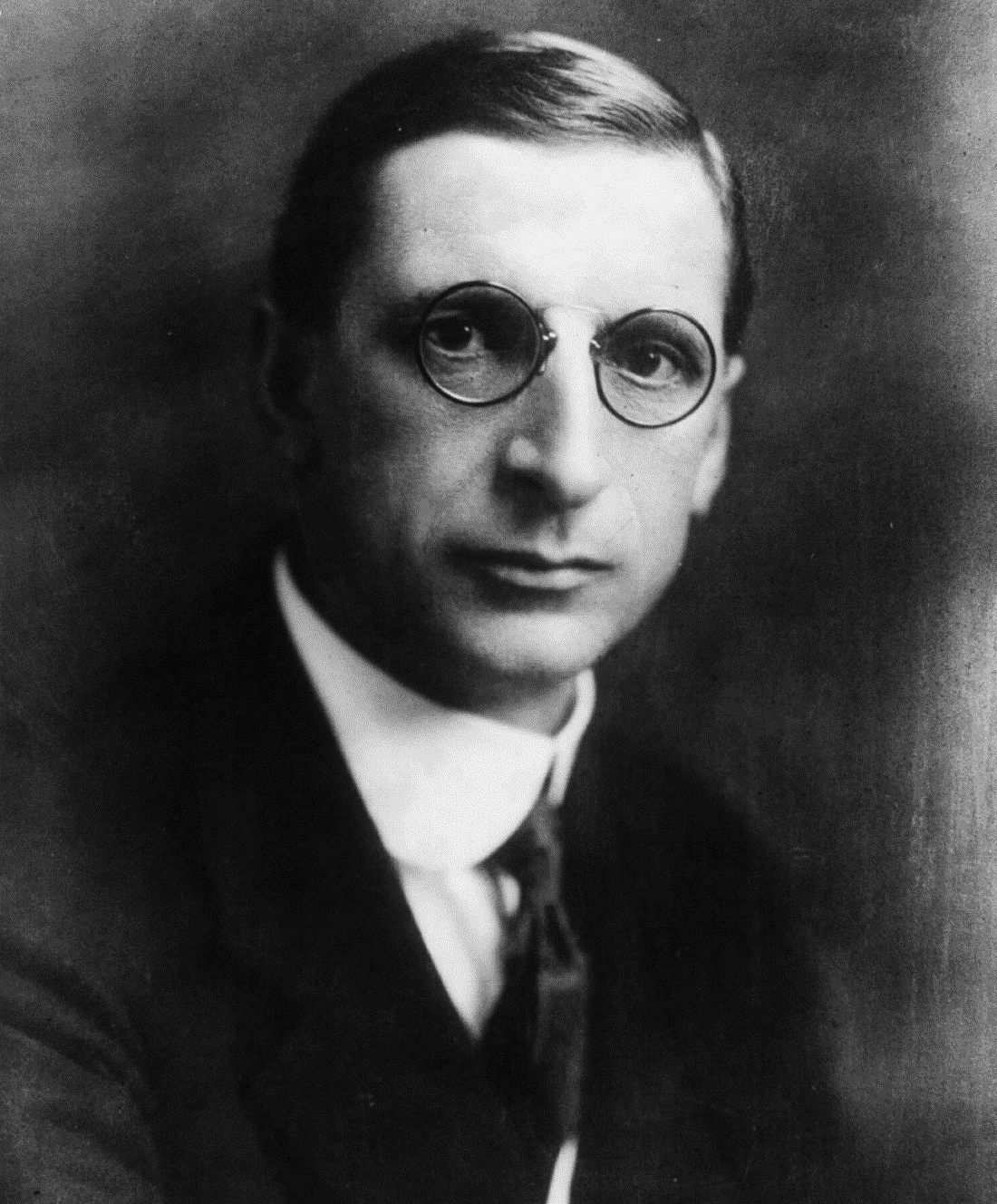
Despite its pervasive influence in civic society, the organisation was disliked by long-serving Taoiseach and President of Ireland, Eamon de Valera

Following Irish independence in 1922, the Knights became more involved in Irish politics. At one stage, they had a significant presence in the Department of Revenue. Indeed, it is thought that former Irish President Seán T. O'Kelly was a member of the Knights of St. Columbanus, much to the displeasure of Éamon de Valera. De Valera publicly distanced himself from the organisation. One occasion, he sought for colleagues to resign their membership. At the 1943 Fianna Fáil Ard-Fheis, he indirectly criticised the Knights of St. Columbanus, calling it "absurd" to maintain "an organization for the protection of Catholic interests" in a country where 93% of the population were Catholics. The society also historically had links to leading figures in the Irish Labour Party. Long enthusiastic to improve the well-being of Catholics in business and corporate life, from the creation of the Irish Free State, they played a key role in influencing legislation to create a Catholic social order.

As part of the Catholic Action movement in the 1930s, a pamphlet published by the Catholic Truth Society of Ireland (CTSI) titled The Serried Ranks of Catholic Action highlighted the Knights of St. Columbanus as one of the primary organisations, using militaristic terms, that could prevent the supposed domination of anti-Christian ideologies such as paganism and Communist activity.

The organisation was closely associated with the unusually influential Catholic Primate of Ireland and Archbishop of Dublin, John Charles McQuaid. On one occasion, a delegation from the College of Physicians, headed by its president, Dr. Howley, and comprising prominent officers of the Knights of St. Columbanus, visited to bestow upon him 'the Borgia ring,' a valuable amethyst from the fifteenth century, purportedly worn by certain mediaeval Popes. On June 25, 1942, McQuaid informed a gathering of the Knights of St Columbanus that he had frequently encountered criticisms regarding their preoccupation with personal, social, and business progress, likening them to the Catholic equivalent of the Masonic Order. He assured them that he would never acquiesce to what he regarded as such ambiguous charges. Under the direction of Dublin City's Chief Planner, Michael O'Brien, who was a fervent member of the Knights of St. Columbanus, McQuaid implemented an initiative to establish a significant Catholic suburban axis to counteract the central hegemony of Trinity College and the Protestant teaching hospitals. O'Brien facilitated McQuaid's rejection of a Dublin Corporation proposal to construct two-bedroom houses in a new development in Finglas, North Dublin, on the grounds that couples required larger residences to cater for the substantial families they were expected to bear as devout Catholics.

In 1944, McQuaid, as Chairman of the Commission of Youth Unemployment, was livid when Minister for Supplies, Sean Lemass TD, suggested that, in order to handle report submissions from Protestants, that religious and spiritual welfare should be excluded from reports. McQuaid complained directly to Eamon de Valera that, as Archbishop of Dublin, he should be allowed to make reference to Catholic social principles. When de Valera told him that it was a lay body in character, McQuaid tactically arranged for Taxing Master of the Courts, Henry B. O'Hanlon, one of his allies through the Knights of St Columbanus, to visit de Valera and articulate to him that McQuaid had allegedly penned a communication resigning as the Commission's chairman. However, McQuaid had not actually done so, and he remained as chairman of the Commission, incorporating Catholic social teaching into the Commission's work.

Similarly to McQuaid, Bishop Michael Browne of Galway utilised the Knights of St. Columbanus in promoting the ubiquitous anti-communist fervour in Ireland during the 1940s.

In 1950, McQuaid joined a group of Irish trade unionists for a special audience with Pope Pius XII at Castel Gandolfo. While in Rome, he distributed money provided by the Knights of St. Columbanus to support impoverished children. In 1955, McQuaid mobilised influential supporters in the Knights of St. Columbanus to antagonise the FAI when Ireland had agreed to host Yugoslavia (being a Communist country) in an international soccer match.

McQuaid clandestinely censored music, films, plays, and novels, through the organisation. The economist Dermot J. O'Flynn, a Knights of St. Columbanus senior and Censorship Board nominee, was crucial to this. McQuaid later thanked O'Flynn for his fight against what they regarded as vulgar productions, and left him to speculate about what the Knights might achieve throughout the nation by their pursuit of an orderly and broad resistance. The State's censorship rules did not apply to theatre, but a pre-independence Act of the Westminster Parliament allowed the Gardaí to close an 'indecent' play, and prosecute the producer. Alan Simpson experienced this in 1957 when he staged Tennessee Williams' The Rose Tattoo at the 'Pike,' a tiny theatrical venue. It was believed that McQuaid started the case against Simpson for mentioning a contraceptive in a play. Dr. Noel Browne said McQuaid also directed the Special Branch. A significant impression on Browne and others remained that the Knights of St Columbanus planned the clampdown, with McQuaid's secret assent. McQuaid proudly informed the Papal Nuncio that Ireland was less affected by "modern deviations" than any other country in Europe or North America. This claim might have held some truth, considering the extensive efforts he made to eliminate such influences through lay associations, particularly the Knights of St. Columbanus.

During the 1950s, when Dr. Noel Browne TD, a left-wing Minister for Health of the Clann na Poblachta party, sought to introduce the infamously controversial 'Mother and Child Scheme,' he faced significant opposition from McQuaid. The scheme, if implemented, would remove much control of healthcare provision from the Church in Ireland. Fine Gael's John A. Costello, Taoiseach of the Inter-Party government at that time, later noted that some Labour Party TDs, had been pushed to support it by the Irish Trades Union Congress, however, Labour's parliamentary chairman, William Davin TD, an active member of the Knights, successfully countered this move. Previously, in June 1948, the Minister for Justice, Seán MacEoin TD, who was a member of the Knights of St. Columbanus, assured its 'Supreme Council' that every effort would be made to prevent any escalating conflict between the Church and the State. McQuaid, himself a Knight, interpreted Noel Browne’s proposals in this context, along with his confidantes in the organisation, Dr. Stafford Johnson and Dr. Stephen McKenzie. During the first Inter-Party government, St. Patrick's Pontifical University, Maynooth (Ireland's primary seminary), was running an annual deficit in its management accounts. John A. Costello, as Taoiseach (and also a member of the Knights), along with other members of cabinet who were also members, awarded the College a special annual grant.

McQuaid was also believed to have been the source of a phenomenon in which Catholic medical doctors (who were members), would swell the AGMs of non-Catholic hospitals, and assume control of voluntary boards. When Protestant physicians raised their grievances with McQuaid, he denied involvement. In 1949, one such notorious incident unfolded, characterised as a conflict between the Knights of St Columbanus and the Freemasons, both vying for influential positions for their members. The Knights, being a Catholic lay organisation devoted to serving Christ in all areas of daily life, including the workplace, secured a majority at the Protestant-run Meath Hospital's AGM. They defeated the existing management, and assumed control. Although the displaced board challenged the outcome in the High Court, their efforts failed. The government subsequently intervened, introducing a private bill that established a new system of representation on the management committee, acceptable to both parties.

In 1948, following the emergence of the Cold War and the likely prospect of a Communist victory in the Italian general election that year, Pope Pius warned of the perceived stark choice between Christianity and "Atheistic Communism." In an unprecedented move, McQuaid assisted in an intervention in Italian politics, and took part in an anti-communist fundraising drive. He received a cheque for IR£5,000 (IR£100,000 as of 1999) from the Knights of St. Columbanus, within 24 hours of requesting support. The Knights would later aid McQuaid in seeking to purge groups with Communist links, particularly the Socialist Youth Movement, as well as students' organisations (which were affiliated with the Communist-endorsed International Union of Students). McQuaid tasked the Knights with weakening such groups, whose aims, they claimed, were "to destroy the Christian faith."

John Hume, former SDLP and credit union movement leader, suggested the idea of founding Derry Credit Union at a Knights of St. Columbanus branch meeting in May 1960. He was subsequently supported by the society in this initiative.

In the late 1960s, when Taoiseach Jack Lynch TD flouted the concept of developing a pluralistic Ireland, he ducked from lifting a ban on contraception when McQuaid confronted him. The professional middle-classes who comprised part of the Knights' membership were especially dedicated on the behalf of McQuaid's "highly effective homespun intelligence system" to protecting a Catholic outlook within government and politics.

Members also held some key positions on hospital boards in the country in the mid-20th century, alongside the mostly Protestant Freemasons. By the 1970s, the Knights had become involved in the politics of tertiary level education, associated with University College Dublin, while the Freemasons were affiliated with Trinity College Dublin. The Knights had also been critical of the Dalkey School Project when it was first set up in 1979 as a multi-denominational school.

The former government minister, Fine Gael's Oliver J. Flanagan TD, who, by the mid-1980s, was one of the longest serving parliamentarians in the Western world, was a staunch member of the organisation, and regarded as a "thorn in the side of the more liberal elements within the Church and his own party."

The Knights' involvement in these sectors has drawn criticism since the 1950s, mostly in the Irish parliament, Dáil Éireann. As a result, the number of individual members of the Knights who sit on hospital, education and government boards has been far less significant since the 1990s. The Order as a whole, however, maintains public stances on matters of politics and education. One recent example of this was the Order's opposition to the repeal of the Eighth Amendment of the Constitution of Ireland which legally permits abortions in the country under a broader range of circumstances. The Order also maintains support for Catholic education in Ireland.

== Organisation ==
The Order follows a tripartite structure, with Supreme, Provincial and Primary levels. There are around 70 Primary Councils across the island of Ireland, each led by a Grand Knight. These councils normally operate at a town level and overall constitute the largest portion of the Order. Each Primary Council sends delegates to make up their Provincial Council, of which there are 12 across the island and each is led by a Provincial Grand Knight. Provincial Councils in turn send delegates to the Supreme Council. The Supreme Council has two levels: the Council of Directors, responsible for the running of the Order from a national perspective and the Supreme Executive, a sub-committee of the Council of Directors, controlling and directing the 12 Provincial Councils. Each level of organisation in the Order is responsible for governing the finances, faith development, charitable enterprises and recruitment of members at each lower level.

The Supreme Knight is the most senior member of the Order. He is elected for a three-year term by the Supreme Council at the Stated Annual Meeting, following elections by every Primary Council. The Stated Annual Meeting rotates around each Provincial Area year on year and is attended by representatives of every Primary Council in Ireland. Any amendments to the Constitution of the Order or other major changes occur at these meetings. Provincial Grand Knights are elected by the members of the Primary Councils in each Provincial Area for three-year terms. Primary Grand Knights too are elected by their local Primary Council for three-year terms.

Each level in the Order has the following assemblage of roles: Grand (or Supreme) Knight, Deputy Grand (or Supreme) Knight, Chaplain, Chancellor, Secretary, Advocate, Treasurer, Warden, Registrar and Last Past Grand (or Supreme) Knight.

Each level in the Order has its own colour of the robe, worn only on formal occasions.

Organisation of Councils of Knights (CK) in Ireland
Provincial Area	Location	Primary Councils
Area 1	Dublin	6, 16, 20, 52, 75, 86, 102, 119 (all Dublin), 146 (Foxrock)
Area 2	Belfast	1, 2, 3, 4 (all Belfast), 12 (Downpatrick), 19 (Queen's University Belfast), 29 (Drumbo & Carryduff), 41 (Belfast), 49 (Holywood), 130 (Ballymena), 133 (Lisburn).
Area 3	Armagh	8 (Armagh), 9 (Portadown), 10 (Newry), 11 (Lurgan), 17 (Dundalk), 76 (Warrenpoint)
Area 4	Derry	5 (Derry), 14 (Omagh), 23 (Strabane), 24 (Letterkenny), 56 (Stranorlar), 69 (Coleraine), 107 (Enniskillen), 143 (Falcarragh)
Area 5	Cork	7 (Cork), 22 (Middleton), 64 (Cork), 70 (Bandon), 113 (Youghal), 123 (Duhallow).
Area 6	Limerick	39 (Limerick), 85 (Roscrea), 90 (Limerick), 132 (Cashel)
Area 7	Galway	30 (Galway), 55 (Tuam), 98 (Ballinasloe), 105 (Claremorris), 126 (Castlebar)
Area 8	Westmeath	25 (Sligo), 45 (Athlone), 74 (Ballina), 88 (Carrick-on-Shannon), 122 (Swinford)
Area 9	Wexford	15 (Waterford), 34 (New Ross), 43 (Kilkenny)
Area 10	Cavan	31 (Monaghan), 47 (Cavan), 79 (Castleblaney)
Area 11	Meath	32 (Drogheda), 40 (Trim), 65 (Navan), 81 (Mullingar), 83 (Tullamore), 112 (Kells), 129 (Portlaoise)
Area 12	Wicklow	100 (Bray), 117 (Arklow & Wicklow)

== Membership and Activities ==
=== Scope of activity ===
In order to be considered for membership in the Knights of St Columbanus, prospective members must be recommended by an existing Knight, a tradition which has stuck from the early days of the Order. Once approved, the knight-elect is initiated at a Mass, usually with several others, attended by the Supreme or Deputy Supreme Knight. During this Mass, the knight-elect receives his robes and a penal cross, a sign of Catholic persecution in Ireland.

Meetings of Primary Councils are chaired by the Grand Knight and start with an opening prayer. Generally, the council chaplain offers some faith teaching and the meeting goes on to discuss fundraising and other projects, concluding with a final prayer.

Much of the work of the Knights involves assisting with church ceremonies, although the Order often raises funds for both their own charitable ventures and that of other organisations. A national project undertaken by Area 3 in 2017 involved the sourcing and subsequent tour of Ireland with a relic of Saint Teresa of Calcutta on the 20th anniversary of her death. This scheme involved Knights from all parts of the country, including the Associate Knights of St Columbanus who were responsible for promoting the tour on Facebook, YouTube and Instagram to make the tour more accessible to younger Catholics. The duties of the Knights involved ensuring that the relic was safely transported around the country and that it was always guarded when available for veneration. Another project of note is the Christmas Day Dinner which has been run by the Order since 1924. The Knights provide a hot meal on Christmas Day for the poor and homeless of Dublin City and the surrounding areas. Both projects have received significant media attention.

=== Associate Knights of St Columbanus ===
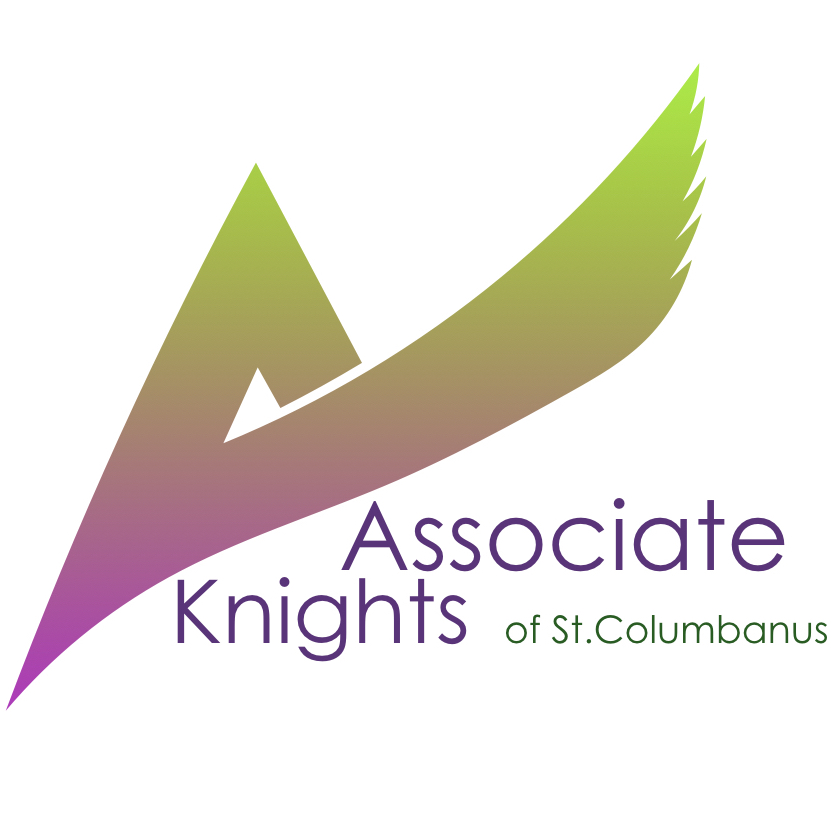
Logo of the Associate Knights of St Columbanus

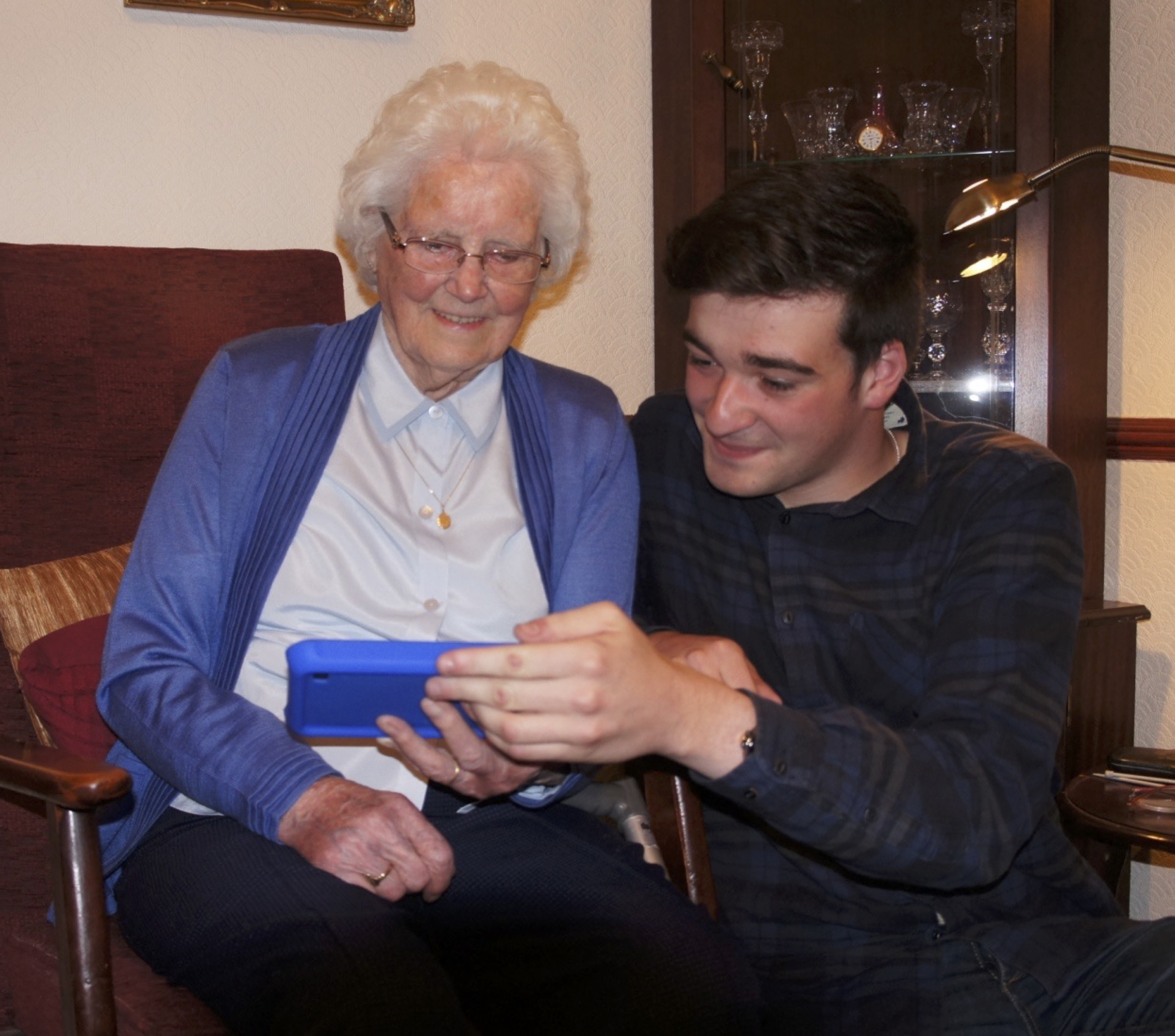
A recipient of an Amazon Kindle Fire Tablet is shown how to use her device. Newry, 2016

The Associate Knights of St Columbanus is the youth section of the order. The scheme was initially introduced in the mid-2000s in St Colman's College, Newry by Canon Francis Brown for 6th Form students (16–18 years). These Associate Knights followed a similar structure to that of the main Knights of St Columbanus and maintained a membership of around 30 students each year. These Associates were initiated as with the main knights and wore the same robes.

In 2013, the Associate Knights were opened up to young men from outside the college. The structure of the Associates also changed so that they no longer followed that of the main Knights. Instead, they would hold their own meetings, as a sub-division of the Newry Primary Council (CK10). The Associates are no longer initiated as with the main knights, rather they participate in a very simple part of a normal Mass where they are presented with the penal cross, but no robes. This way, the Associate Knights are distinct from the older age profile of the main Knights, while maintaining the fraternal and supportive link to Order.

The Associate Knights in Newry meet on a twice-monthly basis where each meeting starts with a faith-development session followed by discussion of their apostolic projects. The faith-development sessions are led by questions the Associate Knights have about their faith and are answered by an invited priest or permanent deacon. These meetings are led entirely by the Associate Knights to promote leadership skills among its members. Members are able to join by contacting the Newry Primary Council or through the Associate Knights' social media. Members are between 16 and 21 years old. Some of their apostolic projects include assisting with the work of St Vincent de Paul, facilitating special church services such as for examinations, and ReKindling Faith in the Housebound. This scheme aims to provide housebound members of the local community with Kindle Fire tablets purchased through locally fundraised money. Recipients of the tablets are then able to watch local Mass and other church services streamed via a webcam. This initiative has received national acclaim as a way of enabling people to participate in their local community, who otherwise would not have been able to do so.

In 2017, the Associate Knights began operating from the Catholic Chaplaincy at Queen's University Belfast. Their meetings followed a similar structure to those in Newry, with the faith-development led by the resident chaplain. The Associates at QUB are supported by the Drumbo and Carryduff primary council of Knights (CK29). In November 2019, the Associate Knights became a full council of Knights, adopting the vacant Council 19 as their number. This represented the first university council in the Order, similar to the College Councils of the Knights of Columbus. Membership is promoted via stalls at University Freshers Fairs and social media. As the youngest students at university are 18, the upper limit is also higher at 25 to span the most common age of university students. Some of their apostolic projects include the Mary's Meals Backpack Scheme, ShelterNI sleep-outs in aid of homeless charities, providing food to the homeless of Belfast, organising guest speakers and supporting the outreach of the Chaplaincy.

=== Pope John Paul II Award ===
The Award was launched by the Papal Nuncio to Ireland Most Rev. Dr. Giuseppe Lazzarotto on 7 November 2006 in the Diocese of Derry. It is coordinated from its head office in Derry, Northern Ireland, and created by Fr Paul Farren in his role as director of the Derry Diocesan Catechetical Centre. Pope John Paul II was chosen as the Award's namesake because of his love, belief, confidence and commitment to young people. The Knights of St Columbanus chose the Award as its National Project and have financially supported the Award throughout Ireland.

It enables young people to take an active part in the life of their Church, community and society. In the spirit of Canon O’Neill's vision for education, the Award facilitates awareness of the role of the Catholic Church in the world and engagement at a deep level with Christ.

The Award is non-competitive, flexible and voluntary. Awards are earned by taking part in parish and social activities. There are three awards, Gold, Silver and Bronze, earned by spending 1 hour per week over 8, 14 or 20 weeks respectively. Those who have completed the Gold Award have a further option of completing the Papal Cross Award.

As well as the feeling of personal achievement that participants hope to gain from taking part in the award, it is hoped that participation will help to show future employers and educators that they are young people who can make an ongoing commitment to a task.

The first patron of the Award was the then Bishop of Derry, Most Rev. Dr. Séamus Hegarty, who said of the Award: "the purpose of this initiative is to enable young people to live their faith and to witness to that faith lived out in the parish community". The current bishop of Derry, Most Rev. Dónal McKeown, is the current patron.

Since 2006, the Award has been running successfully in schools and parishes throughout Ireland and the UK. It is continuing to expand.

In 2017, the Award celebrated its 10-year anniversary with a pilgrimage to Rome and the Vatican. Past and current participants of the Award visited some of the churches and chapels of the cities and got the chance to participate in a Mass in St Peter's Basilica and to visit the tomb of Pope John Paul II. The Knights were represented on the pilgrimage by Associate Knights of St Columbanus from Newry: 181 pilgrims came from 12 dioceses in Ireland. The pilgrimage was captured as part of a UTV documentary 'A New Order'. A televised Mass was also celebrated by Bishop Dónal McKeown on RTÉ with past and current participants of the Award and Supreme Knight Gerald Harbinson on 18 December 2017.

=== Centenary ===
In 2015 the Order celebrated its 100th anniversary. The year began with a Eucharistic celebration on Sunday 12 October in Athlone. After this several events were held to mark the occasion;

- The Schools Public Speaking Competition was created. This encourages students from all over the island to compete in addressing some contemporary issues faced by Catholic youth today. The 2015 competition was a success and, as of 2017, had become an annual event.
- A Day Conference took place in Maynooth College on Saturday 13 June 2015 on the theme of Building a Person-Centered Economy.
- An Icon of St Columbanus was completed and presented to the Order at the 2015 Annual Stated Meeting.
- A hymn entitled 'Prayer of St Columbanus' was composed especially for the centenary.
- A new logo was created and used for the year.
- A Columban Way walk, 'Turas Columbanus', was organised.
- An Order Pilgrimage to Rome and Bobbio (where St Columbanus spent time) was undertaken that April.

== See also ==
- Knights of Columbus, founded in the United States in 1882.
