= 2004 New Hampshire General Court election =

In 2004, Democrats made large gains in Concord, winning the governorship, adding 30 seats in the House, two seats in the Senate, winning an Executive Council seat in District 5 for the first time since the 1960s, one of many races won by Democrats for the first time in decades.

== 2004/2005 special elections and current open seats ==
=== Strafford 3 ===
After Michael Harrington was appointed as a member of the Public Utility Commission in November 2004, he vacated his seat in Strafford County District 3, which includes Barrington, Farmington, Middleton, Milton, New Durham and Strafford.

On March 8, 2005, Democrat Larry Brown of Milton defeated Republican Wilfred Morrison of Farmington 1,858 to 1,551, picking up a seat for the Democrats.

- Election page from the New Hampshire Secretary of State

=== Sullivan 4 ===
The same day as the special election in Strafford District 3, a special election in Sullivan District 4, which consists of Unity, Lempster and Claremont, was held to replace the departure of Democrat Joe Harris.

Republican challenger Phillip "Joe" Osgood defeated former Claremont mayor Ray Gagnon by a tally of 1,125 to 895.

- Election page from the New Hampshire Secretary of State

=== Hillsborough 1 ===
In a surprising upset, Democrat Gilman Shattuck defeated former Hillsborough County Sheriff and Republican Walter Morse 669 to 601 on June 14, 2005.

The two were competing for Republican Larry Elliot's seat in the largely Republican district of Hillsborough 1, consisting of the county's northwesternmost towns: Antrim, Hancock, Hillsborough and Windsor. After Shattuck's victory, Democrats held two of the district's three seats, a feat not copied since before the Civil War.

- Monadnock Ledger story
- Election page from the New Hampshire Secretary of State

=== Cheshire 3 ===
In Cheshire District 3, consisting of the five wards of Keene, Stephanie Sinclair left her seat in mid-spring 2005 because she moved out of New Hampshire. The opening was filled on October 14, 2005, by Keene City Councilman Chris Coates, who received 250 votes while running unopposed. The Democrats kept the seat in the highly Democratic district, continuing their one-seat pickup from special elections after the 2004 general election.

- Election page from the New Hampshire Secretary of State

=== Hillsborough 10 ===
On City Election Day, 2005 (November 8), Democrat Jean Jeudy defeated Republican Rob Fremeau, protecting the party's seat after the departure of Firefighter's Union President William Clayton in a special election in Hillsborough District 10, the State Representative district of Manchester's Ward 3.

Jeudy defeated Fremeau 508 to 322, keeping the Democrats in complete control of the ward's three seats. The election was largely overshadowed by the simultaneous mayoral race, where Frank Guinta upset incumbent Bob Baines.

- Election page from the New Hampshire Secretary of State

=== Grafton 6 ===
The Democrats gained another seat as Jim Aguiar of Campton defeated Christopher Whitcomb of Rumney in the Grafton District 6 (Campton, Ellsworth, Orford, Rumney and Wentworth) special election on December 6, 2005. Aguiar won 558–526, replacing Republican John Alger, who died several weeks earlier.

- Election page from the New Hampshire Secretary of State

=== Rockingham 3 ===
On January 24, 2006, Democrat John Robinson upset Republican Al Baldasaro 57% to 43% in the heavily Republican district of Rockingham 3, which consists of the towns of Londonderry and Auburn.

- Election page from the New Hampshire Secretary of State
- John Robinson's website
- Article on the primary at the Lawrence Eagle Times (subscription required)

== Senate ==
=== Predictions ===
Source	Ranking	As of
Rothenberg	Safe R	October 1, 2004

=== District 1 ===
John T. Gallus (R-Berlin) defeated Jerry Sorlucco (D-Littleton) by a vote of 15,822 (59.5%) to 10,748 (40.4%).

== House of Representatives ==
=== Predictions ===
Source	Ranking	As of
Rothenberg	Safe R	October 1, 2004

=== Hillsborough County ===
==== Hillsborough 19 ====
2004 Hillsborough 19 New Hampshire General Court Election: Democrat / Democrat+Republican / Republican / Republican+Democrat / Independent / Incumbent / Winner
Candidate	Votes	Won/Lost By	%	%Won/Lost By
Peter Batula	8003	2109	% 8.71	%2.29
Bob L'Heureux	7949	2055	% 8.65	%2.24
Chris Christensen	7293	1399	% 7.93	%1.52
Bob Brundige	6940	1046	% 7.55	%1.14
Nancy Elliott	6571	677	% 7.15	%.74
Maureen Mooney	6322	428	% 6.88	%.47
Pete Hinkle	6090	196	% 6.63	%.21
John Gibson	6082	188	% 6.62	%.2
James O'Neil	5894	-188	% 6.41	-%.2
Pam Green	5580	-502	% 6.07	-%.55
Pat Heinrich	4579	-1503	% 4.98	-%1.64
Don Botsch	4501	-1581	%4.9	-%1.72
Richard Arthur	4579	-1809	% 4.65	-%1.97
Andrew Sylvia	4185	-1897	% 4.55	-%2.06
Kevin O'Neill	3833	-2249	%4.17	-%2.45
Jacob Weisberg	3823	-2259	% 4.16	-%2.46

Hillsborough 19 consists of the heavily Republican town of Merrimack, which showed during election day as all eight GOP candidates swept the Democratic slate to take the town's eight seats in Concord.

==== Hillsborough 24 ====
2004 Hillsborough 24 New Hampshire General Court Election: Democrat / Democrat+Republican / Republican / Republican+Democrat / Independent / Incumbent / Winner
Candidate	Votes	Won/Lost By	%	%Won/Lost By
David Campbell	2390	832	% 30.84	%10.74
Jane Clemons	2106	548	% 27.18	%7.07
Roland Lefebvre	1677	119	% 21.64	%1.54
Sandra Ziehm	1558	-119	% 20.11	%-1.54

The 24th District of Hillsborough County, consisting of Nashua's mostly urban and Democratic Ward 6, was swept by the Democrats, including a dual primary sweep by David Campbell.

The only Republican running in Hillsborough 24 was City GOP Chairwoman Sandra Ziehm.

=== Sullivan County ===
==== Sullivan 3 ====
2004 Sullivan 3 New Hampshire General Court Election: Democrat / Democrat+Republican / Republican / Republican+Democrat / Independent / Incumbent / Winner
Candidate	Votes	Won/Lost By	%	%Won/Lost By
Harry S. Gale Jr.	1144	315	% 57.98	%15.97
David Brown	829	--	% 42.02	--

In the non-floterial first past the post district of Sullivan 3, which consists of the town of Sunapee, Republican Harry S. Gale defeated Democrat "Hometown" David Brown in the race to refill the seat of non-returning Republican incumbent Richard Leone.
