= List of New Hampshire General Courts =

List of New Hampshire state legislatures

The following is a list of legislative terms of the New Hampshire General Court, the law-making branch of government of the U.S. state of New Hampshire. The legislature continues to operate under the amended New Hampshire Constitution of 1784.

== Legislatures ==
Number	Name	Start date	End date	Last election
1	1784-1785 New Hampshire General Court	June 2, 1784	February 25, 1785	
2	1785-1786 New Hampshire General Court	June 1, 1785	March 4, 1786	
3	1786-1787 New Hampshire General Court	June 7, 1786	January 18, 1787	
4	1787-1788 New Hampshire General Court	June 6, 1787	February 13, 1788	1787
5	1788-1789 New Hampshire General Court	June 4, 1788	February 7, 1789	1788
6	1789-1790 New Hampshire General Court	June 3, 1789	January 26, 1790	1789
7	1790-1791 New Hampshire General Court	June 2, 1790	February 18, 1791	1790
8	1791-1792 New Hampshire General Court	June 1, 1791	January 6, 1792	1791
9				
10				
11				
12				
13				
14				
15				
16				
17				
18				
19				
20	1811 New Hampshire General Court	June 5, 1811	June 21, 1811	1811
21	1812 New Hampshire General Court	June 3, 1812	December 18, 1812	1812
22	1813 New Hampshire General Court	June 2, 1813	November 5, 1813	1813
23	1814 New Hampshire General Court	June 1, 1814	June 24, 1814	1814
24	1815 New Hampshire General Court	June 7, 1815	June 28, 1815	1815
25	1816 New Hampshire General Court	June 5, 1816	December 26, 1816	1816
26	1817 New Hampshire General Court	June 4, 1817	June 28, 1817	1817
27	1818 New Hampshire General Court	June 3, 1818	June 30, 1818	1818
28	1819 New Hampshire General Court	June 2, 1819	July 2, 1819	1819
29	1820 New Hampshire General Court	June 7, 1820	December 23, 1820	1820
30				
31				
32				
33				
34				
35				
36				
37				
38	1829 New Hampshire General Court	June 3, 1829	July 4, 1829	
39	1830 New Hampshire General Court	June 2, 1830	July 3, 1830	
40	1831 New Hampshire General Court	June 1, 1831	July 2, 1831	
41	1832 New Hampshire General Court	June 6, 1832	January 5, 1833	
42	1833 New Hampshire General Court	June 5, 1833	July 6, 1833	
43	1834 New Hampshire General Court	June 4, 1834	July 5, 1834	
44	1835 New Hampshire General Court	June 3, 1835	June 27, 1835	
101 ?	1889-1890 New Hampshire General Court	January 1889		November 1888
102 ?	1891-1892 New Hampshire General Court			November 1890
103 ?	1893-1894 New Hampshire General Court			November 1892
104 ?	1895-1896 New Hampshire General Court			November 1894
105 ?	1897-1898 New Hampshire General Court	January 1897		November 3, 1896
106 ?	1899-1900 New Hampshire General Court			November 1898
107 ?	1901-1902 New Hampshire General Court			November 1900
108 ?	1903-1904 New Hampshire General Court	January 1903		November 4, 1902
109 ?	1905-1906 New Hampshire General Court			November 1904
110 ?	1907-1908 New Hampshire General Court			November 1906
111 ?	1909-1910 New Hampshire General Court			November 1908
112 ?	1911-1912 New Hampshire General Court			November 1910
113 ?	1913-1914 New Hampshire General Court	January 1913		November 5, 1912
114 ?	1915-1916 New Hampshire General Court	January 1915		November 3, 1914
119 ?		January 7, 1925		November 1924
134 ?		1955		
149	1985-1986 New Hampshire General Court		1986	November 1984
150	1987-1988 New Hampshire General Court		1988	November 1986
151	1989-1990 New Hampshire General Court	December 1988	1990	November 1988
152	1991-1992 New Hampshire General Court		1992	November 1990
153	1993-1994 New Hampshire General Court		1994	November 1992
154	1995-1996 New Hampshire General Court	1995	1996	November 1994
155	1997-1998 New Hampshire General Court	1997	1998	November 1996
156	1999-2000 New Hampshire General Court	1999	2000	November 1998
157	2001-2002 New Hampshire General Court	2001	2002	November 2000
158	2003-2004 New Hampshire General Court	2003	2004	November 2002
159	2005-2006 New Hampshire General Court	2005	2006	November 2, 2004
160	2007-2008 New Hampshire General Court	December 6, 2006	2008	November 2006
161	2009-2010 New Hampshire General Court	December 2008	2010	November 2008
162	2011-2012 New Hampshire General Court	December 2010	2012	November 2, 2010
163	2013-2014 New Hampshire General Court	December 5, 2012	2014	November 6, 2012
164	2015-2016 New Hampshire General Court	December 1, 2014	2016	November 4, 2014 House, Senate
165	2017-2018 New Hampshire General Court	December 7, 2016	2018	November 2016: House, Senate
166	2019-2020 New Hampshire General Court	December 5, 2018	2020	November 6, 2018: House, Senate
167	2021-2022 New Hampshire General Court	December 2, 2020	2022	November 3, 2020: House, Senate
168	2023-2024 New Hampshire General Court	December 7, 2022	2024	November 8, 2022: House, Senate
169	2025-2026 New Hampshire General Court	December 2024	2026	November 5, 2024: House, Senate

== See also ==
- List of speakers of the New Hampshire House of Representatives
- List of presidents of the New Hampshire Senate
- Elections in New Hampshire
- List of governors of New Hampshire
- Politics of New Hampshire
- Historical outline of New Hampshire
- Lists of United States state legislative sessions
