= Hayes Prison Farm =

Minimum security prison in Tasmania, Australia

- Interactive map of Hayes Prison Farm
- Location: Hayes, near New Norfolk, Tasmania; 42°45′00″S 147°0′00″E
- Status: Closed
- Security class: Minimum
- Capacity: 70
- Opened: 1937
- Closed: 2012
- Managed by: Tasmanian Prison Service

Hayes Prison Farm, a former Australian minimum security prison for males, was established on land at Hayes, near New Norfolk, Tasmania. The facility was operated by the Tasmanian Prison Service, an agency of the Department of Justice of the Government of Tasmania. Located on 800 hectares (2,000 acres), the facility accepted felons convicted under Tasmanian and/or Commonwealth legislation. The facility was closed in late 2012.

== Facilities ==
The original site consisted of an orchard, grazing land and a small forest. The prison was opened in 1937 and consisted of single wooden huts for 20 persons, built by prisoners. Another 50 single huts were built as numbers increased. A 50-cell block was built in 1968 and an extra block of 20 cells was built in 1970. The cell and administration buildings were replaced with concrete block construction in 1964 and are still in use today. At its peak, Hayes had large market vegetable gardens, 1,000 pigs, 1,800 laying hens, 2,000 sheep, an award-winning dairy herd and a clay processing plant that sold clay to Salamanca potters. Three truckloads packed with vegetables left the prison farm each week. Their customers included the Royal Derwent Hospital, Lachlan Park, the Royal Hobart and St John's hospitals, several nursing homes in the Hobart region, government departments and the prison itself. More than 300 cows were at Hayes. The farm was also responsible for a much smaller herd, which kept the grass short at Government House in Hobart. Hayes sold 1.1 million litres of milk to dairy company National Foods each year. It also grew about 7,000 kilograms (15,000 lb) of glasshouse, vine-ripened tomatoes and 1,700 bales of hay and silage.

The purpose of the farm was to assist inmates to develop skills to prepare them for exiting prison and to address recidivism.

In June 2011, it was announced that the Hayes Prison Farm would be decommissioned because of a A$4.5 million repair bill. It was expected that the decommission process will take approximately 18 months. Prisoners would be moved to the recommissioned Ron Barwick facility at Risdon Prison. The decision to close Hayes was condemned by the State Opposition, unions and prisoner advocates.

In July 2011, three prisoners escaped in two separate incidents over three weeks, two of whom were caught within 24 hours.

The Tasmanian Government closed Hayes Prison Farm in August 2012 and moved all inmates to the minimum security Ron Barwick facility at Risdon Prison.

The property was sold to a private owner in January 2015.

== Notable prisoners ==
- James Ryan O'Neill
