= James Ryan O'Neill =

Convicted murderer

- Born: Leigh Anthony Bridgart {{birth year 1947; Melbourne, Victoria, Australia
- Died: 2022 74-75 age at death
- Conviction: Murder
- Penalty: Life Imprisonment

Details
- Victims: 2+
- Span of crimes: 1960s–1975
- Country: Australia
- States: Tasmania; allegedly several others

James Ryan O'Neill (born Leigh Anthony Bridgart in 1947) is an Australian convicted murderer and suspected serial killer, currently serving a life sentence in Tasmania for a murder he committed in February 1975.

Allegations have been made that O'Neill also murdered a number of other children in several Australian states from the mid-1960s whilst he was still a teenager through to the murder that he was imprisoned for in 1975. He is currently Tasmania's longest-serving prisoner for a single offence.

He was the subject of a documentary, The Fishermen, which was broadcast on ABC TV in October 2006.

== Life ==
O'Neill attended Brighton and Caulfield Grammar Schools and Scotch College following which he began working in real estate. He later became a gun dealer and is known to have associated with members of Melbourne's underworld.

Between 1965 and 1968, O'Neill (as Bridgart) worked in the opal industry, which required frequent travel between Melbourne and Coober Pedy in South Australia. He then obtained work on a cattle station in the Kimberley region of Western Australia. In 1969, a business partner accidentally shot him in the head while playing with a pistol. The bullet, which entered his right forehead and came out of his neck, destroyed his sense of smell and taste. Bridgart went on to give many reasons for the bullet wound to various people including it being the result of serving in Vietnam, that his mother's boyfriend had shot him and being an ASIO spy.

In 1971 Bridgart was charged with 12 offences involving abductions and sexual assaults of four boys in Victoria. He skipped bail and fled to Western Australia. In November 1974 he moved to Tasmania and changed his name to James Ryan O'Neill.

== Arrest ==
In February 1975 nine-year-old Ricky John Smith (also known as Ricky Kube) was abducted and O'Neill was one of many who helped in the search for the missing boy. Over the next two weeks five children were abducted in separate incidents but all managed to escape. Nine year old Bruce Colin Wilson was then abducted and his body was found in May 1975 near Risdon Vale. O'Neill was a suspect and after interrogation led police to the body of Ricky Smith. Although arrested for both murders he was only tried for Ricky Smith's murder following legal practice at the time. O'Neill pleaded insanity, due to his head injuries from being shot in 1969, and claimed that police had held a gun to his head to get his confession.

After deliberating for three hours, the jury found O'Neill guilty and he was jailed for life. He applied for parole in 1991 and again in 2005 but was turned down and has not reapplied. He remains Tasmania's longest serving prisoner.

== Documentary ==
In the 1990s, freelance journalist Janine Widgery approached a retired Victorian detective, Gordon Davie, with a proposal to make a documentary on James O'Neill. Davie saw no story suitable for a documentary and declined. In 1998 Davie read in a news report that O'Neill had been transferred in 1991 to the low security Hayes Prison Farm and was allowed to go fishing in the Derwent River unsupervised. The same report claimed that O'Neill had no criminal record prior to his conviction for murder. Davie thought this unlikely because Davie believed it was rare for a serial killer to start so late in life. Davie wrote to O'Neill asking for permission to interview him.

Davie interviewed him for the entire day with O'Neill claiming he had never even received so much as a parking ticket before the murders. Davie contacted Widgery and told her he didn't believe a word O'Neill had said and he thought there would be a story. Over the next four years Davie recorded hundreds of hours of their conversations.

O'Neill was highly intelligent and charismatic. Davie said afterwards: "He is one of the most likeable men you would ever meet. On the first day of filming there were six or seven out there and at end of the day I said, "What do you think of him?" They all said, "You've made a mistake, this bloke couldn't have done anything wrong", however a pattern emerged from the interviews, of the places O'Neill visited, children had gone missing in seven or eight of them. It was also alleged he was in Adelaide about the time the Beaumont children disappeared and that he had told people he was responsible for their disappearance.

The resulting documentary The Fishermen, named for O'Neill's passion for fishing and Davie's belief he also used the term as a euphemism for his murders, was scheduled for broadcast on ABC television on 21 April 2005 but O'Neill applied for an injunction on the grounds it was defamatory and would hurt his chances of parole. The case, O'Neill v Australian Broadcasting Corporation, Roar Film Pty Ltd and Davie, was heard by the Supreme Court on 22 April. The judge ruled in favour of O'Neill and granted an interlocutory injunction against the broadcast in Tasmania. As the documentary could still be viewed by 500 houses in northern Tasmania due to transmission overlap from the mainland the documentary was pulled nationwide. On 29 August 2005, the ABC's appeal against the decision was dismissed 2–1 by a full sitting of the Tasmanian Supreme Court. The ABC appealed this decision to the High Court of Australia in Sydney which in a 4–2 decision quashed the Tasmanian Supreme Court ruling allowing the program to be aired in October 2006.

Chief Justice Murray Gleeson and Justice Susan Crennan wrote in their joint judgement: "It is one thing for the law to impose consequences … in the case of an abuse of the right of free speech, It is another … for a court to interfere with the right of free speech by prior restraint." Dissenting Justice Michael Kirby wrote: "Effectively, it means that any prisoner, serving a sentence for a heinous crime is fair game for anything at all that a media organisation … might choose to publish".

=== The Beaumont children ===
In the early 1970s O'Neill told a station owner in the Kimberley and several other acquaintances that he was responsible for the disappearance of the Beaumont children. Although O'Neill claims never to have visited Adelaide, the roads to travel from Victoria to Coober Pedy pass through Adelaide. The Tasmanian Police Commissioner, Richard McCreadie was also interviewed for the documentary and claimed that O'Neill was going backwards and forwards through Adelaide frequently at about that time. When asked if he had murdered the children O'Neill replied "Look, on legal advice I am not going to say where I was or when I was there". O'Neill has never spoken on the subject again. He now denies being in South Australia between 1965 and 1968.
