= Rory Jack Thompson =

Australian CSIRO scientist and convicted murderer (1942–1999)

Jack Newman
- Born: Rory Jack Thompson; 10 May 1942; Seattle, Washington, U.S.
- Died: 18 September 1999 (aged 57); Risdon Prison Complex, Tasmania, Australia
- Occupation: CSIRO scientist
- Children: 3
- Motive: Child custody
- Conviction: Not convicted due to mental health

Jack Newman (10 May 1942 – 18 September 1999), better known by his birth name Rory Jack Thompson, was an Australian CSIRO scientist and murderer.

In September 1983, he was charged for murdering his wife, Maureen Thompson, in their Hobart, Tasmania, home and after dismembering her body, he dumped the remains down a toilet. He was not sentenced to serve in prison on the grounds of insanity, but instead, was detained in a hospital attached to the Risdon Prison Complex for an unspecified period of time.

Thompson wrote an autobiography in 1993 providing stories of his early life and the subsequent murder. On 18 September 1999, several months after he attempted an escape, Thompson was found dead in his hospital cell after he hanged himself using a shoelace. His suicide, along with that of five other Risdon Prison inmates, prompted an inquest on the prison's procedures.

== Personal background ==
Rory Jack Thompson was born in Seattle, Washington, and was the oldest of Richard Cuthbert and Alice Mary (née Saunders) Thompson's three sons. Richard was a conscripted soldier before working as a fisherman, while Alice was a dental assistant. When Thompson was in the 10th grade, Richard and Alice divorced, which led to Alice's eventual alcoholism. Alice granted full custody of the children to Richard shortly after the divorce and he became their sole provider and parent.

Thompson spent his childhood attending various camps and was active in a folk-dancing community in his area. It was through this community that he met his first wife Luella, who was several years his senior. He was a student at San Diego State College at the time of his marriage. After graduating with a degree in mathematics, Thompson applied to Massachusetts Institute of Technology for a post-graduate degree in oceanography. During this period Luella and Thompson divorced. Luella retained full custody of their daughter Nuala.

Throughout his academic career, Thompson contributed to more than 40 scientific works, both as an individual and in collaboration. His research was wide-ranging with subjects from mathematics to oceanography.

=== Marriage ===
Thompson met his second wife, Maureen Ellen (maiden name unknown), through a mutual friend and they married soon after. When Thompson was offered a job as a temporary lecturer at the University of Western Australia, the couple decided to migrate to Australia. Thompson's second marriage resulted in two children, Melody and Rafi. In 1983, the family moved to Hobart after Thompson was promoted to the position of sponsored researcher for CSIRO in Hobart.

Soon after the move, Maureen Thompson filed for divorce. Prior to their divorce she had reported Thompson for domestic violence and had spent several weeks in hospital due to physical abuse. As a consequence, she received a protective order to keep her from harm. During the custody battle between the Thompsons, Maureen Thompson was granted temporary custody of their children, however Thompson was granted visitation at his residence on Saturdays.

== Murder and investigation ==
Thompson felt that he was under attack as Maureen had taken steps to prevent him spending money in their bank accounts. He had been accused of domestic violence, and he felt that his visitation with the children was under threat. One night while his children were at his house, Thompson set off on foot intending to kill and bury Maureen, however once in sight of her house Thompson abandoned his plan and returned home. This is not the first time Thompson had murderous thoughts, he admitted in his autobiography that he had once contemplated the murder of his first wife in order to gain custody of his eldest daughter.

At this point Thompson was not sleeping well and was taking medication to help him sleep. He felt that the people around him were not on his side and that Maureen was not keeping her word in their custody battle. Thompson was also under stress from his new job, the move, the death of his mother and the threat of having to move out of the CSIRO family accommodation he was living in. Thompson bought half a sheep, dismembered it and tested to see if he could flush the pieces down the toilet. While on a work trip to Sydney he purchased a hacksaw and other tools in preparation. On 10 September 1983 Thompson took the children to his house for his scheduled visitation. Once they were in bed and locked in he set off for Maureen's house at 99 Hill Street, Hobart on foot, wearing a wig and wraparound skirt to conceal his identity and carrying a bag of tools. He waited in the garden until Maureen had gone to sleep then entered the house with a spare key. She woke, and there was a brief struggle during which he struck his estranged wife with a table leg, he then proceeded to strangle her. Following the murder Thompson cut Maureen's body into smaller pieces using a hacksaw and meat cleaver and then flushed the pieces down the toilet. He took the parts he couldn't deal with to the bush above Pottery Road, Lenah Valley and buried them.

In his autobiography, Thompson explained his reasons for cutting up Maureen's body:

Why did I cut up the body? Actually, I no longer fully understand the mental processes that led to it, but fundamentally I cut it up because it would not flush down the toilet whole. Why flush it down the toilet? Fundamentally, to get rid of the evidence. But why a toilet? After all, my original thought had been simply to bury the body, but that plan had gone away, though the folding shovel was still in the bag. I now think that in the many hours of agonising, my adult mind collapsed between fear and the felt necessity to make Maureen vanish, and the toilet was a very young child’s solution for how to get rid of guilty bad doo-doo.

After disposing of the body Thompson returned home to the children. The following day he took them swimming and re returned to work on Monday to finish his 50th scientific publication. On 13 September 1983, Thompson reported Maureen missing. In the early days of her disappearance, a finger was found at the sewage works sewer, which raised suspicions about Thompson's missing person report. The next day, the investigators visited Maureen's house and found evidence of violence. During investigations of the house's sewer system the coroner, Dr. Royal Cummings, found 60 pieces of unidentified body parts and another 23 identified parts. Several days later, the investigators found Maureen's severed head in Lenah Valley. The ten-day-long investigation gave sufficient evidence for the police to arrest Thompson.

== Conviction and prison ==
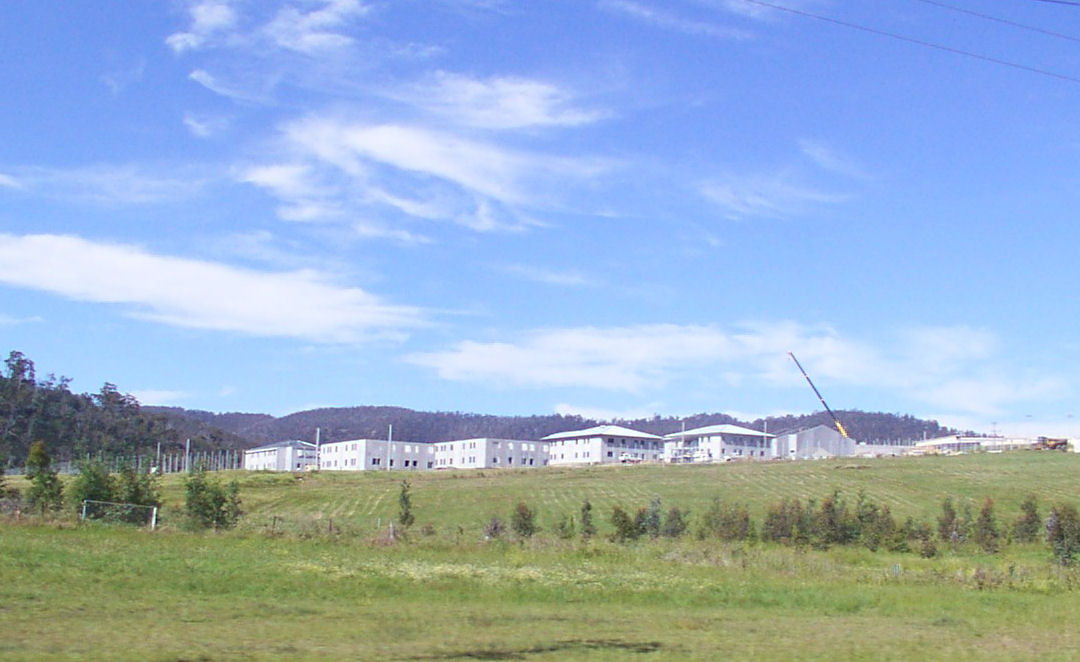
Risdon Prison Complex where Thompson spent 16 years in before his death

On 29 February 1984, Thompson was not convicted of murder on the basis that he suffered from a mental disorder. As a result, Thompson was detained in Risdon Prison's hospital indefinitely. It was concluded that Thompson had a significant personality disorder, which include lack of social understanding and excess arrogance. According to his publisher, Thompson would not acknowledge his personality disorder, but occasionally "had little grip on reality".

As a result of his arrest, his two children were taken in by Maureen's sister, Kathleen Marchant, to California and they adopted the last name Marchant. As they grew up, they were prohibited to contact Thompson, however, it was known that he allocated all earnings from his autobiography sales to his children's trust fund. In the years prior to his death, his son Rafi also initiated some contact with his father, with regular twice a week calls. Not long before his death, Rafi pleaded for his father to be released, although his sister and aunt did not share the sentiment.

In 1993, Thompson wrote an autobiography under the title Mad Scientist which was published by Southern Holdings and distributed only in Australia. Wendy Lesser, in her review on Kate Grenville's Albion’s story, mentioned his autobiography and regarded the book as "bare and often poorly constructed", although it gave "an inside view of the pathetically deluded, distressingly self-justifying, willfully self-deceiving perpetrator".

Throughout his detention, he applied twice to the Medical Health Review Tribunal to be declared sane. The tribunal had also suggested his release, but all attempts were declined by Tasmania's government. In 1994, Thompson legally changed his name by deed poll to Jack Newman.

On 5 July 1999, Thompson attempted an escape. He was able to obtain a credit card by unknown means, which allowed him to withdraw cash to buy a commercial plane ticket to Melbourne. His permit to work in the prison garden outside the walls assisted him in his escape, however after a conversation with a woman he met at a bus-stop, Thompson, who was still clad in his prison uniform, was reported to the police. This tip enabled the authorities to capture him just minutes before his plane took off. Thompson's attempt to escape resulted in him being placed in a maximum-security prison. As a consequence, it is reported that Thompson suffered depression and was referred to Dr Alan Jager, one of the prison hospital's resident psychiatrists.

=== Death ===
Three days before his death, it was reported that Thompson was taken off his prescribed anti-depressant by Dr. Jager, against the advice of a locum doctor a few days prior. On 18 September 1999, Thompson was found dead in his cell after hanging himself using a shoelace. His memorial service was held on 23 September that year in an undisclosed location.

His death, along with the deaths of five other inmates under Dr Jager's supervision in less than a year, prompted the Magistrates Court Tasmania to initiate an inquest into the prison hospital's psychological department. The inquest concluded that Thompson's suicide was due to the carelessness of the prison officers in both supervising a prisoner with suicidal tendency and responding to Thompson's death. It was also found that there were insufficiencies in the hospitals' practices in inmate mental health care, such as giving Thompson a cell with numerous suspension points and failure in notifying his psychiatrist about his health information.

== Published scientific works ==
- Thompson, R. (1982). A potential- flow model of turbulence caused by breaking surface waves. Journal of Geophysical Research, 87(3), 1935
- Thompson, R. (1983). Set-up of Sydney Harbour by waves, wind and atmospheric pressure. Australian Journal of Marine and Freshwater Research, 34 (1), 97
- Thompson, R., & Edwards, R. J. (1981). Mixing and water-mass formation in the Australian Subantarctic. Journal of Physical Oceanography, 11(10), 1399-1406
- Freeland, H. J., Boland, F. M., Church, J. A., Clarke, A. J., Forbes, A. M. G., Huyer, A., ... White, N. J. (1986). The Australian Coastal Experiment: A search for coastal-trapped waves. Journal of Physical Oceanography, 16(7), 1230-1249
- Thompson, R. O. R. Y. (1987). Continental-shelf-scale model of the Leeuwin Current. Journal of Marine Research, 45, 813-827
