= Ballyvoy =

Village in County Antrim, Northern Ireland

Coordinates: 55°12′N 6°11′W

Ballyvoy: Irish: Baile Bhóidh
- Pub at a road junction in Ballyvoy

- Location within Northern Ireland
- Population: 136 (2021 census)
- District: Causeway Coast and Glens
- County: County Antrim
- Country: Northern Ireland
- Sovereign state: United Kingdom

Ballyvoy (from Irish Baile Bhóidh or Baile Bhuí) is a small village and townland in County Antrim, Northern Ireland. It is on the main A2 coast road 5 km east of Ballycastle and 17 km north west of Cushendall.

== Geography ==
Ballyvoy village sits between a high ridge to the north, and the valley of the Carey River to the south. It lies within the Antrim Coast and Glens Area of Outstanding Natural Beauty and is part of Causeway Coast and Glens District Council.

Ballyvoy is also a townland is in the parish of Kilbride near Ballyclare.

Murlough Bay, near Ballyvoy, has been used as a filming location for Death of Robin Hood and Games of Thrones.

Climate data for Ballypatrick Forest (1991–2020 averages)
Month	Jan	Feb	Mar	Apr	May	Jun	Jul	Aug	Sep	Oct	Nov	Dec	Year
Mean daily maximum °C (°F)	6.9 (44.4)	7.2 (45.0)	8.6 (47.5)	10.6 (51.1)	13.3 (55.9)	15.6 (60.1)	17.0 (62.6)	16.9 (62.4)	15.3 (59.5)	12.2 (54.0)	9.2 (48.6)	7.3 (45.1)	11.7 (53.1)
Mean daily minimum °C (°F)	2.4 (36.3)	2.3 (36.1)	3.0 (37.4)	4.4 (39.9)	6.4 (43.5)	9.0 (48.2)	10.8 (51.4)	10.9 (51.6)	9.5 (49.1)	7.2 (45.0)	4.6 (40.3)	2.8 (37.0)	6.1 (43.0)
Average precipitation mm (inches)	131.6 (5.18)	106.4 (4.19)	97.2 (3.83)	80.3 (3.16)	80.0 (3.15)	85.8 (3.38)	97.6 (3.84)	109.1 (4.30)	99.5 (3.92)	142.9 (5.63)	149.5 (5.89)	145.9 (5.74)	1,325.7 (52.19)
Average precipitation days	18.8	16.2	16.2	13.9	13.5	13.8	15.7	15.9	15.3	17.8	19.5	18.8	195.5
Mean monthly sunshine hours	42.5	70.4	98.8	165.4	202.5	162.5	146.5	146.5	112.2	90.8	50.7	31.7	1,320.3

== History ==
Evidence of ancient settlement in the area includes a number of passage grave and court tomb sites, including Ballyvoy Passage Tomb. There are several standing stones in the churchyard at Culfeightrin, west of Ballyvoy.

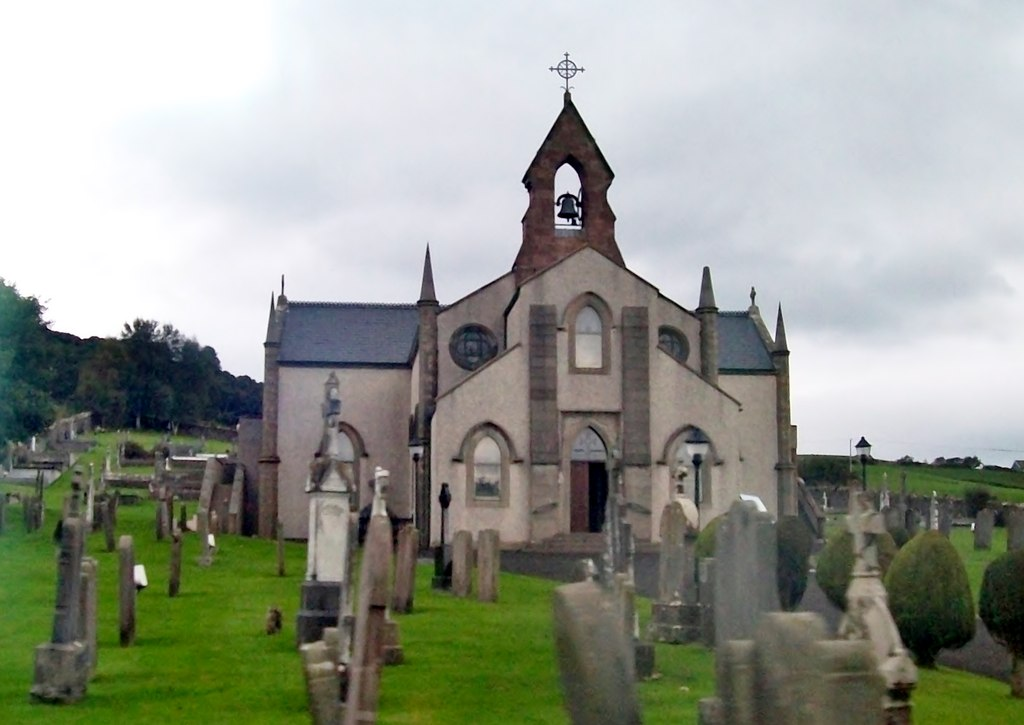
St. Patrick's Church, Ballyvoy

The former primary school in the area, Barnish Primary School, closed in 2021.

== Demographics ==
As of the 2021 United Kingdom census, Ballyvoy then had a population of 136, down from 167 as of the 2011 census. At the 2001 census, Ballyvoy had a population of 72 people.

== Sport ==
Ballyvoy also has a hurling team called Carey Faughs GAC. This club has won the Antrim Intermediate Hurling Championship four times, and the Ulster Intermediate Hurling Championship twice. Ballyvoy does not have a camogie team but players from the area play with Niamh Padraig North Antrim which includes, Cloughmills, Cushendun, Armoy and Ballyvoy.

== People ==
- James K Cannon O'Neill, who founded the Knights of Columbanus in 1915, was born and raised at Ballypatrick, County Antrim. After studying in Maynooth, he was appointed parish priest of the Sacred Heart Parish in Belfast in 1906. He died in 1922 and is buried in Ballyvoy.
- James Black, a sportsperson, has played hurling for Carey Faughs GAC.

== See also ==
- List of villages in Northern Ireland
