= Risdon Prison Complex =

Prison in Tasmania, Australia

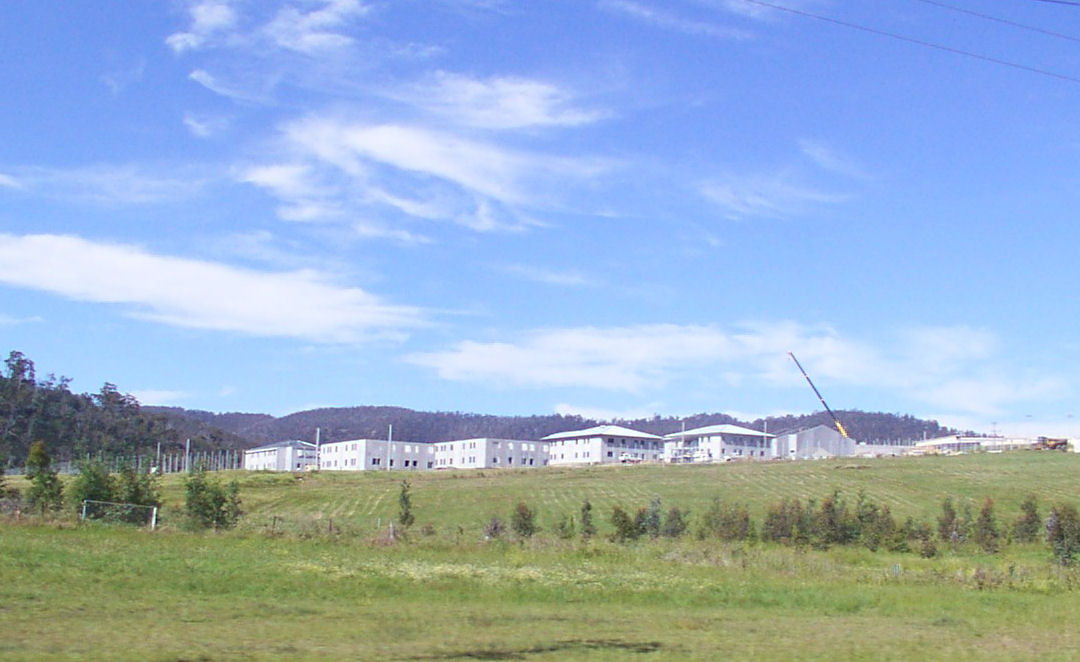
- The Risdon Prison Complex, pictured during 2001–2006 construction
- Interactive map of Risdon Prison Complex
- Location: Risdon Vale, Tasmania; 42.812°S 147.34°E
- Status: Operational
- Security class: Medium to maximum
- Capacity: 280
- Opened: November 1960
- Managed by: Tasmanian Prison Service

Risdon Prison Complex is an Australian medium to maximum security prison for males located in Risdon Vale, a suburb of Hobart, Tasmania. The facility is operated by the Tasmanian Prison Service, an agency of the Department of Justice of the Government of Tasmania. The facility accepts criminals convicted under Tasmanian and/or Commonwealth legislation.

The complex comprises 219 maximum security cells for males; 84 medium security cells for males; and a 38-bed secure mental health unit called the Wilfred Lopes Centre for Forensic Mental Health. A separate 45-bed women's prison, called the Mary Hutchinson Women's Prison, is located adjacent to the Risdon Prison Complex. The complex was formerly known as HM Prison Risdon.

== History ==
Correctional facilities at Risdon have been constructed in two phases, between 1956 and 1963, and again between 2001 and 2006.

A series of escapes from the Campbell Street Gaol in Hobart resulted in a 1943 Royal Commission into the H.M. Gaol Department. In 1949 the Department obtained by compulsory acquisition a 90 acres (36 ha) property on the eastern side of the Derwent River, not far from Risdon Cove where the initial European settlement of Tasmania occurred. In 1956, plans commenced to design the prison and construction was completed in 1960.

Facilities for female prisoners were completed in 1963, and inmates were moved from Campbell Street Gaol, resulting in closure of the Campbell Street Gaol. The new women's facility, initially known as Risdon Women's Prison, is now called the Mary Hutchinson Women's Prison.

In 1974, a low security unit, later called the Ron Barwick Medium Security Prison, was opened, accommodating 120 inmates at its peak. By 1981, declining numbers resulted in closure of the unit. The minimum security was re-opened in 1991 and closed again in 1997 on the grounds of economic viability. The medium security facility opened again, and closed in 2004 as part of the redevelopment of the whole complex. In 2007, the facility was reopened as a minimum security centre.

A special prison hospital was built in 1978, that houses persons suffering mental illness who are subject to the criminal justice system.

== Facilities ==
=== Maximum security ===
Opened in November 1960 as Her Majesty's Prison Risdon, the 349–cell maximum security prison was widely considered the most advanced prison in Australia. Critics have called the design, which embodies concepts in prison architecture from the U.S., several decades out of date and unsuitable for Tasmania's temperate climate, particularly in winter. The architect was Brian B. Lewis of the University of Melbourne.

All prisoners were accommodated in single occupancy cells containing a toilet and hand basin with running water. Heating was also provided in the cells together with access to local radio stations on headphones. During construction, inmate populations increased, and Lewis's original plans were changed by adding 72 additional cells, halving the space devoted to exercise yards. None of the other prison facilities, such as workshops and recreation space, were enlarged to allow for the increased capacity.

The complex houses maximum security inmates within its Derwent, Huon, Franklin and Tamar units. With the exception of Tamar, mainstream maximum-security units each have 26 beds, mostly single bed cells but with several two-bed "buddy" cells. The cells are located over two storeys around a common "day" area including lounge and dining facilities. Cells are equipped with a shower, toilet, bed, writing desk and television. Access is available to an attached, mesh-enclosed, exercise yard. The maximum-security part of the campus also includes needs assessment, protection, crisis support, detention and behaviour management units, with layouts similar to the mainstream units.

The behaviour management unit, called Tamar, is an 8-cell high security unit used to house prisoners who are considered to pose a particularly high risk to correctional staff, to other prisoners or detainees, or to the maintenance of good order and security in the prison.

=== Wilfred Lopes Centre for Forensic Mental Health ===
In 2006, the Wilfred Lopes Centre for Forensic Mental Health replaced the Risdon Prison Hospital. The prison hospital was located within the grounds of the old H.M. Risdon Prison and had 28 single cells that provided medical assessment on reception, outpatient care, inpatient care, and inpatient psychiatric care.

The Wilfred Lopes Centre is situated near the Risdon Prison Complex, but is not part of the prison. It is a health facility owned and managed by the Department of Health. Patients are provided with specialised psychiatric care and treatment. Treatment is based on individually tailored programs designed to support independence and dignity, and minimise the ill effects of long-term care. The 35-bed unit caters for the varying needs of clients, including a mix of males and females. The grounds are landscaped to help create a therapeutic environment. The Centre includes 12 beds in a high-dependency unit, for people with acute illness; 18 beds in an extended care unit, for people who require a less restrictive environment and are able to participate in rehabilitation activities; and 5 beds in a semi-independent living unit for people preparing for discharge into the community. There is also a 3-bed de-escalation suite with three seclusion rooms, lounge and courtyard (not counted as part of bed-numbers).

=== Medium security ===
Located outside the perimeter of the maximum security prison, the Ron Barwick Medium Security Prison contained thirty six cells and an indoor recreation area. This facility operated an incentive for inmates of the maximum security prison to strive to achieve a medium security classification in order that they may be transferred to the better conditions in the Ron Barwick Prison. The facility has opened and closed on several occasions since it first opened in 1974. The facility was demolished in 2004 to make way for the new prison. In 2006, the old H.M. Risdon Prison was renamed as Ron Barwick Minimum Security prison, even though is it classified as a medium security environment. Medium security inmates are housed in units of either 6 or 8 beds. Each unit has individual bedrooms, along with a two-bed "buddy" room, and common lounge, dining, toilet and shower facilities. Inmates have access to a majority of the outdoor grounds in the medium security part of the complex.

== Inquiries into facilities ==
In 1999, a Tasmanian Parliament Committee reported that the number of cells far exceeded any likely requirements at the time of construction or since. The Committee reported that the Corrective Services Division advised that between 1992 and 1997 the entire prison system had an average of between a total of 250 and 300 inmates spread through all the facilities. The Committee reported that the facility is "fundamentally inappropriate":

It operates as a series of cages and cells which open to exposed yards. It is devoid of any of the normal features of a dwelling or residential facility. The only institution in our society with which this facility could be closely compared is a zoo. It would be difficult to design an institution which would be more calculated to promote an alienated sub-culture, entirely inconsistent with desirable normal social behaviour and values.

A 2001 report by the Tasmanian Ombudsman stated:

No prison is a pleasant place, but the Risdon Prison is a particularly unpleasant place. It is bleak, cold and grey and, even if a very large amount of money were to be spent on the facility, it is unlikely that it could ever conform to contemporary prison standards. The buildings reflect years of relative neglect by successive governments and even when it was built, forty years ago, the Prison would have been out of date and totally inappropriate in its design for the rigours of a Tasmanian winter. Moreover, it was built as a Maximum Security Prison and remains so, even though the demand has never been for a full maximum security facility. When additional stresses, such as an unexpected surge in prisoner numbers or a significant change in the nature of the prisoner population occur, as has happened at Risdon, there is an inevitable strain on resources and management. Staff morale drops, inmate unrest and dissatisfaction escalate and the system begins to crack. This is what had happened at Risdon, and had been happening for a significant period of time prior to the investigation.

The Ombudsman's Report follows a coronial inquiry into five deaths in custody that occurred between August 1999 and January 2000. In March 2011 the Coroner found that in four of the five cases, management of the complex:

...failed to provide a physical environment which would minimise the risk of self harm and a system of care which would recognise a vulnerability to suicide and actively promote steps to prevent it.

The Ombudsman reported again, this time in 2010, when he initiated an investigation of his own accord following receipts of a number of complaints during 2007 and 2008 which made him concerned about the conditions under which the prisoners in the high risk management unit, called Tamar, were being held. In his report, the Ombudsman commented that:

I was concerned that the conditions in Tamar might not be humane.

Further, he found:

that there is no formal practice for informing prisoners of the reasons for their placement in the unit, and that the management of the unit does not comply with national or international standards in this regard.

that prisoners are not adequately informed about the rules and conditions which apply to them in the unit, and that this is not compliant with national standards.

that prisoners have been held in the unit for indeterminate periods of time, on the basis of perceived dangerousness, and that this is incompatible with national standards and standards observed in other jurisdictions.

that the BMP [Behavioural Management Program] has not always been applied consistently and objectively.

that the monthly reviews of a prisoner's performance under the BMP are not carried out with procedural fairness, in that prisoners are not notified in advance of any perceived problem with their behaviour, are not therefore given a fair opportunity to respond, and are not given prior warning of a proposed sanction. There have even been cases of reviews without the prisoner being present.

that not only are prisoners in the unit locked down in solitary confinement for most of the time, but they have nothing constructive to do, since no programs or industry activities are available to them. The principal distraction is television. This circumstance is not humane, and does not meet standards adopted in the United Kingdom or standards promulgated by the Inspector of Custodial Services in WA, which in my view are indicative of proper practice.

In 2010, Mick Palmer, a former Commissioner of the Australian Federal Police, was requested by the Minister for Corrections and Consumer Protection, Nick McKim to undertake an inquiry into the Risdon Prison Complex, with the intention of providing the Government of Tasmania with impartial, objective and accurate advice on the complex's operations. Amongst his findings and recommendations, in 2011 Palmer commented that:

...there is currently a lack of clear and decisive leadership within the TPS [Tasmanian Prison Service] and RPC [Risdon Prison Complex]. Further, there is a high level of distrust between management and staff, where operational practices have served to cause staff to withdraw from interaction with prisoners, compounding into excessive lockdowns (particularly of maximum security rated prisoners) and, overall, to apply what can only be described as little more than containment policy across the prison as a whole.

One of the outcomes of the Palmer Report was the employment of a prison administrator and a prison inspector to help rid the prison of serious cultural problems.

== Controversies ==
In 1967, a fire started by prisoners had almost destroyed the workshop complex. The building had used a great deal of timber in its construction and no fire protection system had been installed. It was rebuilt with prison labour at a cost of A$300,000.

During a four-month period in 1999 and 2000, five men died while imprisoned at Risdon. An investigative media report by the ABC Four Corners program highlighted that there have been at least 18 deaths in custody at Risdon in 12 years, the findings of the coronial inquiry, and the failure of successive governments to address problems at the centre.

During the 2001 coronial inquiry, it was recommended that young inmates should not be housed with sex offenders. In spite of this recommendation, in 2004 it was reported that young inmates were often sharing accommodation and shower facilities with convicted child sex offenders.

On 7 May 2005, male prisoners took prison officer Kenneth Hannah and several other inmates hostage to protest against poor conditions, demanding the resignation of Tasmanian Attorney-General Judy Jackson and the public servant in charge of prisons. The siege ended on 9 May 2005.

On 16 April 2006, Easter Sunday, prisoners took keys from a female prison officer and a 20-hour siege ensued, ending the next day. The ostensible reason for the action was the quality of food served to inmates.

Some within the community argue that the current facility, programs and management of prisoners are actually counter productive in promoting rehabilitation of criminals or reducing crime.

In 2015, Robin Michael, a health official took his own life in the jail. He had allegedly murdered his wife a few days earlier.

== Notable prisoners ==
- Andy Muirhead (1975– ) – TV and radio presenter
- Mark Brandon "Chopper" Read (1954–2013) – Notorious criminal and author (Imprisoned in Risdon Prison until 1998 and was imprisoned in Victoria for separate charges)
- Martin Bryant (1967– ) – Gunman responsible for the Port Arthur massacre that killed 35 on 28–29 April 1996
- Rory Jack Thompson (1942–1999) – Australian CSIRO scientist and convicted murderer
- Randall Ludlow Askeland (1947–?) – Launceston lawyer, stamp collector, and notorious wife murderer
- Wayne William Howlett (1980– ) – powerlifter
- Edmund Rouse (1926–2002) – ENT chairman convicted of bribery
- Peter James Barrett (c. 1973– ) – of Hobart, former plumber jailed for two years (one non-parole) and ordered to pay a fine of $447,000 in 2002 after a conviction for processing $4 million worth of illegal abalone and falsifying records to sell undocumented abalone under the company 'Tasmanian Sealife'. Barrett and some other men smuggled dried abalone out of Tasmania to buyers in Queensland and subsequently, China. Caught by Tasmania Police's Operation Oakum under which illegal trafficking was traced back to his Rokeby operation.
- Robin Michael (1952–2015) – a senior South Australia health official who allegedly murdered his wife. He took his own life while he was an inmate in 2015.
- Corey Cadby (1995–) Australian professional darts player
