= James O'Neill =

James, Jamie, or Jimmy O'Neill may refer to:

== Arts and entertainment ==
- James R. O'Neill (1833–1863), American Civil War artist and correspondent
- James O'Neill (actor, born 1847) (1847–1920), Irish-American theater actor
- James O'Neill (actor, born 1863) (1863–1938), American vaudeville and early film actor
- Jamie O'Neill (born 1962), Irish novelist

== Law and politics ==
- James O'Neill (Wisconsin settler) (1810–1882), American settler, politician, and sawmill owner
- James O'Neill (New Zealand politician) (1819–1882)
- James O'Neill (Washington politician) (1824–1913), American politician in Oregon and Washington states
- James O'Neill (jurist) (1847–1929), American jurist and politician
- James E. O'Neill Jr. (1929–2002), American politician in Michigan

== Sports ==
- Tip O'Neill (baseball) (James Edward O'Neill, 1860–1915), Canadian baseball player
- Jimmy O'Neill (footballer, born 1931) (1931–2007), Irish international footballer
- James O'Neill (baseball) (died 1993), American baseball and basketball player
- James O'Neill (rugby union), Irish international rugby union player

== Others ==
- James Hugh O'Neill (1892–1972), American Catholic priest
- James O'Neill (priest) (died 1922), Irish founder of the Knights of Saint Columbanus
- James E. O'Neill (1929–1987), American acting Archivist for the National Archives
- James Ryan O'Neill (born 1947), Australian serial killer
- James P. O'Neill (born 1950s), American police commissioner in New York City

== See also ==
- Jim O'Neill (disambiguation)
- James A. O'Neil (1800–1874), American politician in Oregon
- James O'Neil Mayne (died 1939), Australian philanthropist
- James O'Neal, pseudonym of writer James O. Born
- James Neal (disambiguation)
