= Wayne William Howlett =

Australian convicted drug trafficker and powerlifter

Personal information
- Born: 1980 (age 45–46)
- Occupation: Gym Owner
Medal record
Representing Australia
1st	2012 WRPF World Championships
2nd	2013 WRPF World Championships

Wayne William Howlett (born 1980) is an Australian powerlifter who has competed at the World Raw Powerlifting Federation World Championships.

== Criminal activity ==
Until at least 2002, Howlett belonged to a criminal group known as the Glenorchy Mafia with his brother Shaune Henry Howlett and one Benjamin Maxwell Pearce.

In 2002, Howlett was sentenced to 6 months' imprisonment for instigating an aggravated assault on rival gang members Steven Maxwell and Brett Hynes.

Howlett was later involved in an attempt to blow up a forensic laboratory. On 8 March 2000, Howlett, and a criminal associate named Joseph Andrew Tonner, went to the Government Analytical & Forensic Laboratory with an explosive device and two tins of petrol. The three climbed onto the roof of the administration building. Howlett prised open a window, and Tonner placed the explosive device on shelving in the building and lit it. The purpose of doing so was said by the prosecution to be to destroy evidence believed to be in the laboratory, that would lead to the conviction of Graeme Hall for trafficking in a substantial quantity of amphetamine. On 22 November 2004, Howlett pleaded guilty to possessing a dangerous object with the intent to commit a crime, and attempting to unlawfully injure property, possessing an explosive device between January 1999 and March 2000, and to igniting petroleum and a bomb in an attempt to damage material inside a forensic laboratory. Howlett received 2 years' imprisonment with 20 months suspended, with Justice Peter Underwood noting, "I have not heard such convincing evidence of self-motivated rehabilitation by a prison inmate".

On 24 March 2010, Howlett pleaded guilty to trafficking in methylamphetamine, after a "sting" operation saw him exchange 27.1 grams of the drug and $4,100 for five pistols. Howlett received 2 years' imprisonment.

On 24 June 2018, Howlett, accompanied by another man and with his face smeared with war paint, went to Pablo's Cocktail Bar in central Hobart. He was armed with a World War Two-era SKS semi-automatic carbine. The gun was loaded, and he carried at least 143 additional 7.62×39mm rounds for it. He fired 25 bullets at the club's steel-clad entrance door, a number of which penetrated it. At his sentencing hearing, Howlett's lawyer said his client had spiralled in to depression and drug use following his 2017 injury and could not remember the incident. The judge did not accept that Howlett had acted on impulse, noting he had a dispute with the club manager, and sentenced Howlett to five years' imprisonment, without parole for three years.

== Powerlifting ==
Howlett is a Tasmanian powerlifter known for his performances in the World Raw Powerlifting Federation (WRPF). Following a ban from drug-tested sports in 2006 after testing positive for steroids, he continued his career in non-tested federations.

Howlett secured multiple titles, including 1st place at the WRPF World Championships in 2012 and the Down Under Classic in 2017, alongside several Tasmanian State Titles between 2005 and 2014.

In 2017, a torn biceps muscle required reconstructive surgery, ending his competitive powerlifting career.
