= James O'Neill (priest) =

Irish priest

Canon James Kearney O’Neill was a native of Ballypatrick, County Antrim, Ireland, where his maternal uncle, Thomas J. Kearney, had previously been parish priest.

The order of the Knights of Columbanus was founded in 1915 by Rev. O'Neill to promote and foster Catholic faith and education.

He was born and raised at Carey House, Ballypatrick, Carey. He studied at the Classical School in Downpatrick, enrolled in St. Malachy's Diocesan College Belfast, in February 1872 and entered Maynooth in September 1875. In 1906 he was appointed parish priest of the Sacred Heart Parish, Oldpark Rd., Belfast.

He was greatly influenced by the social teaching of the Church and particularly the encyclical "Rerum Novarum" Fr. O’Neill (then Canon) died on 18 March 1922 and is buried at the rear of the church in Ballyvoy. The Order pays tribute to him in May of every year by the celebration of Mass in Ballyvoy.
