= Jane Clemons =

American politician

Jane A. Clemons

Member of the New Hampshire House of Representatives from the Hillsborough 24th district
- Incumbent
- Assumed office 1990

Personal details
- Born: April 2, 1946 (age 80) Poughkeepsie, New York
- Party: Democratic
- Spouse: Michael
- Profession: Licensed practical nurse

Jane A. Clemons is a Democratic former member of the New Hampshire House of Representatives, representing the Hillsborough 24th District since 1990. She a past Chair of the Nashua Democratic City Committee.
