= Risdon Vale =

- Suburb
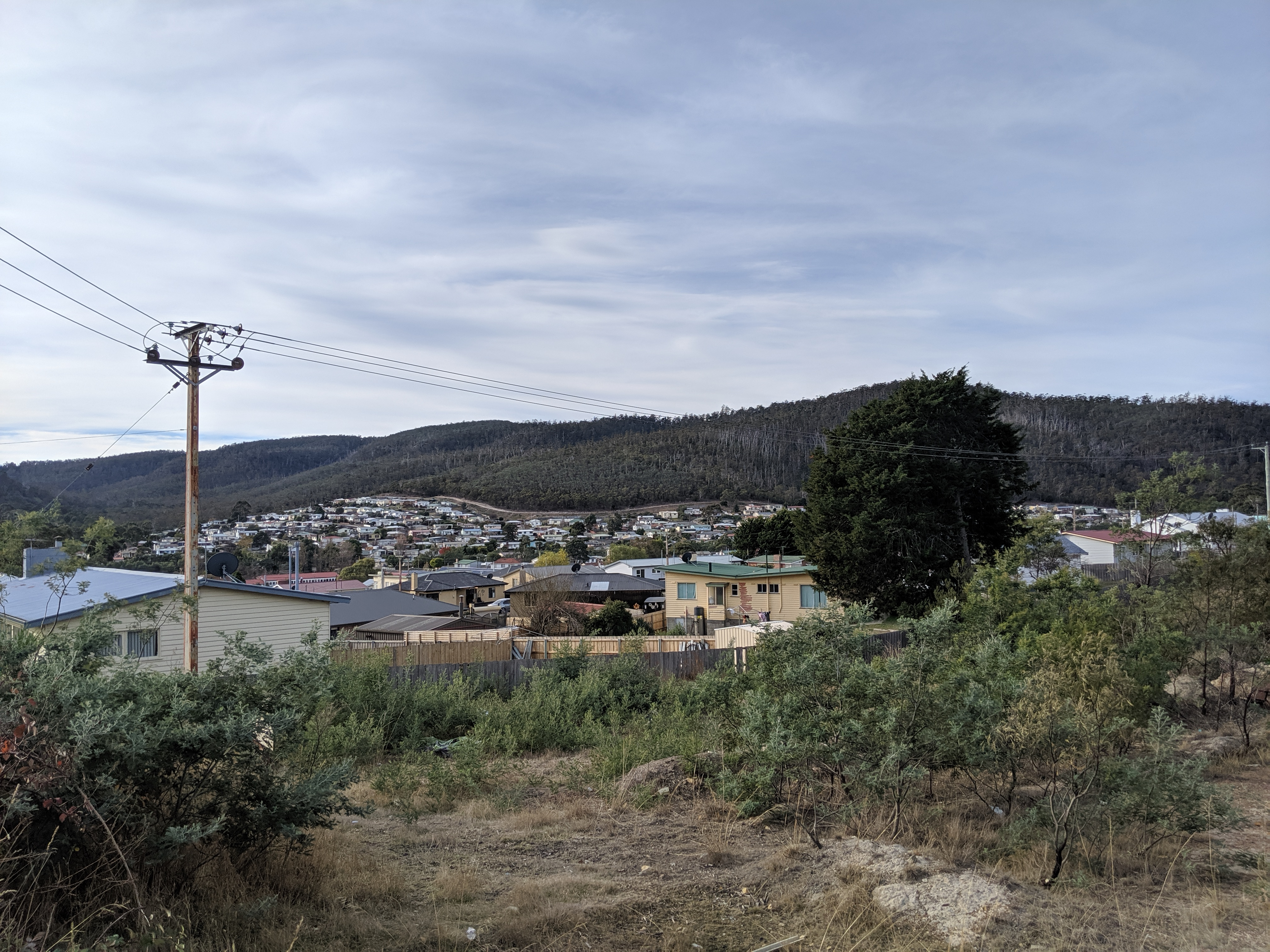
- Risdon Vale, from Sugarloaf Road looking north-east

- Interactive map of Risdon Vale
- Coordinates: 42°48′44″S 147°21′5″E
- Country: Australia
- State: Tasmania
- City: Hobart
- LGA: City of Clarence

Government
  - Federal division: Franklin

Population
  - Total: 3,563 (2021 census)
- Postcode: 7016
Suburbs around Risdon Vale
Otago	Grasstree Hill
Risdon	Risdon Vale
Geilston Bay	Geilston Bay

Risdon Vale is an outer suburb of Hobart, capital of Tasmania, Australia on the eastern shore of the River Derwent, and adjacent to Risdon Cove, which was the site of the British colonisation of Van Diemen's Land.

== History ==
Risdon Vale Post Office opened on 1 November 1960. Between 1961 and 1963 there was a subdivision of a few hundred houses and in 1960 Risdon Vale Primary School was founded. The first subdivided parts of Risdon Vale was the area South of Gardenia Road and the area around Waratah Road.

== Today ==
It is the location of Tasmania's only maximum security prison, Risdon Prison and Risdon Women's Prison. Risdon Vale also is close to Risdon Brook Park and Dam which offers a pleasant walking track round the dam of 4 km, taking in views of Mount Wellington and its surrounds.

Risdon Vale has a small population of around 3,000. Much of the area is surrounded by scrub and bush, which becomes particularly dry in the summer season and poses as a high fire risk. There has been a history of bushfires in the area. The Risdon Vale Volunteer Fire Brigade was established in September 1981 and the fire station, on Sugarloaf Road, was opened on 14 May 1982.

== Roads ==
The East Derwent Highway, connects Risdon Vale with Hobart CBD; The Bowen Bridge to Glenorchy; Grasstree Hill Road connects Risdon Vale to the historical town of Richmond in the north.

== School ==
Risdon Vale Primary School was founded around 1960, along with most of the residential housing in the area.

== Transport ==
Metro Tasmania buses run from Risdon Vale to central terminals in Hobart or Rosny Park as well as in Glenorchy and can also travel to Bridgewater.
