= James Kerby Neill =

James Kerby Neill (1906 - 21 August 1996) was professor emeritus of English at The Catholic University of America, Washington, D.C. He was an author and researcher with a Ph.D. in Shakespearean studies

== Early life and education ==
Neill was born in 1906 to Charles Patrick Neill (b. 1865 in Rock Island, IL) and Esther A. Waggaman (b. 1874 in Washington, D.C.). He was a graduate of Georgetown Preparatory School and Georgetown University, and received a doctorate in English literature, focusing on Shakespeare, from Johns Hopkins University.

== Career ==
Neill taught at St. Louis University and the College of New Rochelle before joining Catholic University in 1938. He was chairman of the English department from 1962 to 1969 and retired in 1974.

In January 1965, Neill received the Benemerenti Medal bestowed by the University's rector on behalf of Pope Paul VI, for his 25+ years’ service to the University. During his tenure at Catholic University he was on the Academic Freedom committee and the Budget Committee of the Academic Senateand was appointed head of a committee from the Academic Senate, to review the University's handling and discussion of the Papal encyclical Humane Vitae, and whether it met standards for academic freedom under the AAUP.

Neill served on the board of directors of the William J. Kerby Foundation, a national organization founded in 1941, dedicated to promoting the fundamental principle of the dignity of man, focusing attention on the spiritual basis of democracy, encouraging Americans to put this spiritual concept of democracy to practical use in the fields of education, social service, public administration, labor and industrial relations, and developing a strong, alert, and active lay leadership. His father, the prominent Charles P. Neill, and also a faculty member of Catholic University, had been officially elected its honorary president on April 26, 1942, the same day it adopted its constitution and by-laws.

== Personal life ==
Neill married Julia Day Stewart. He died on August 21, 1996, at a nursing home in Elk Grove Village, Illinois.
