= Mary Hutchinson Women's Prison =

Women's prison in Risdon Vale, Tasmania

- Interactive map of Mary Hutchinson Women's Prison
- Location: Risdon Vale, Tasmania; 42.812°S 147.34°E
- Status: Operational
- Security class: Minimum to maximum
- Capacity: 45
- Opened: 1963 (outside H.M. Risdon Prison); May 2006 (redeveloped)
- Managed by: Tasmanian Prison Service

Mary Hutchinson Women's Prison, formerly Risdon Women's Prison, an Australian minimum to maximum security prison for females, is located in Risdon Vale, Tasmania. The facility is operated by the Tasmanian Prison Service, an agency of the Department of Justice of the Government of Tasmania. The facility accepts people convicted under Tasmanian and/or Commonwealth legislation.

== Facilities ==
The 45–bed women's prison allows accommodation for the children of inmates. The facility is located adjacent to the Risdon Prison Complex, a prison comprising 219 maximum security cells for males; 84 medium security cells for males; and a 38–bed secure mental health unit for males and females, called the Wilfred Lopes Centre for Forensic Mental Health.

The prison is divided into maximum, medium and minimum security environments. The prison also has common facilities that include an outdoor basketball court and visits area, several multi-purpose facilities, areas for education and programs activities, and a health clinic. Inmates prepare their own meals.

=== Maximum security ===
The maximum security component comprises 15 single cells, separated into a six cell unit and a nine cell unit. Cells are all on the ground level and are located around a common 'day' area including lounge and dining facilities. Cells are equipped with a shower, toilet, bed, writing desk and television. Access is available to an attached, mesh enclosed, exercise yard.

=== Medium security ===
Medium security inmates are housed in a single unit with 12 cells. The unit has individual bedrooms and common lounge, dining and shower facilities. Inmates have access to most of the outdoor grounds in the medium security part of the campus.

=== Minimum security ===
Minimum security inmates are housed in a single unit with 11 rooms. The unit has individual bedrooms and common lounge, dining, toilet and shower facilities. Inmates have access to most of the outdoor grounds in the minimum security part of the prison. Minimum security accommodation also includes a seven-bed 'mother & baby' unit capable of housing mothers with their infant children.

== See also ==
- Risdon Prison Complex
- Wilfred Lopes Centre for Forensic Mental Health
