= Gilman Shattuck =

American politician (1926–2026)

Member of the New Hampshire House of Representatives from the Hillsborough 1st district
- In office 2005–2010
- In office 2012–2016

Personal details
- Born: Gilman Conant Shattuck; December 19, 1926
- Died: October 15, 2026 (aged 99)
- Party: Democratic
- Spouse: Sieglinde Shattuck
- Education: Tuck School of Business

Gilman Conant Shattuck (December 19, 1926 – October 15, 2026) was an American politician. A member of the Democratic Party, he served in the New Hampshire House of Representatives from 2005 to 2010 and again from 2012 to 2016, representing the Hillsborough 1st district.

Shattuck died on October 15, 2026, at the age of 99.
