= Chris Christensen (politician) =

American politician

Member of New Hampshire House of Representatives for Hillsborough 21
- In office 2014–2018

Member of New Hampshire House of Representatives for Hillsborough 19
- In office 2010–2012

Personal details
- Born: 1947 (age 78–79)
- Party: Republican

Chris Christensen (born 1947) is an American politician. He represented Hillsborough County in the New Hampshire House of Representatives for three terms.
