= James O. Born =

American novelist

- Born: West Palm Beach, Florida
- Education: Florida State University
- Occupation: Author
- Writing career
- Pen name: James O'Neal

James O. Born is an American novelist who used a career in law enforcement to add realistic details and dialogue to his crime thrillers. His first novel, Walking Money, released in 2004, received rave reviews and was shortlisted for the Barry Award (for crime novels). His third novel, Escape Clause, won the gold medal in the inaugural Florida Book Award. He currently co-writes many of his novels with best-selling author James Patterson.

== Early life and education ==
Born was raised in West Palm Beach, Florida, and attended Florida State University. Born went to graduate school at the University of Southern Mississippi. After graduation, Born became interested in law enforcement.

== Law enforcement career ==
He started his career with the US Marshals Service and transferred within the US Department of Justice to the US Drug Enforcement Administration (DEA). He worked as a Special Agent for the DEA in South Florida until 1990. Born then accepted a job with the Florida Department of Law Enforcement (FDLE) as a Special Agent. This job gave him access to a much wider variety of investigations. In addition to working on interesting investigations involving organized crime, serial killers, public corruption, and narcotics, Born joined the FDLE Special Operations team.

While working for the DEA, Born was assigned to the Miami Field Division and worked out of the West Palm Beach field office. He worked cases all across the state, as well as in Central America. Born worked undercover, helping in the investigation of several large smuggled loads of cocaine.

Born also worked for the Florida Department of Law Enforcement in South Florida. His time with the FDLE included an undercover assignment at a meeting of the Ku Klux Klan, buying unlawful weapons undercover, working on several serial killer investigations, and work on the Special Operations team.

Born is a recipient of the US Attorney's Officer of the Year award, the Florida Distinguished Service award, the Medal of Valor, and a number of other commendations. In 2011, Born was awarded the Lifesaving Medal directly from the Governor of Florida after he jumped into a canal at night to rescue a little girl who had been thrown from a wrecked vehicle.

== Transition to writing ==
In late 1980s, Born met crime writer Elmore Leonard through a mutual friend. Leonard asked if Born could provide him with some technical advice, and their friendship lasted until Leonard's death in 2013. Born acted as a technical advisor to the short-lived ABC series Karen Sisco, starring Carla Gugino. It was with Elmore Leonard's encouragement that Born first started plotting out a novel. After reading so many police novels that had no relation to reality, Born thought it was important to write a book about which even a cop would think, "I could see that happening."

Born wrote two novels that were never published. It was his third novel, Walking Money, that attracted the attention of literary agents and quickly led to a multi-book deal with Putnam books (G. P. Putnam's Sons).

== Writing career ==
After the publication of his first novel, Born has made every effort to stay on schedule to publish one novel a year. He followed Walking Money with two sequels called Shock Wave and Escape Clause. Published in 2006, Escape Clause won the inaugural Florida Book Award for Best Novel, which he received directly from the Governor of Florida.

His next two novels, Field of Fire and Burn Zone, feature an ambitious ATF agent who still lives with his parents.

Born wrote two science fiction novels next. They were published by Macmillan, under the pseudonym James O'Neal. The name change was designed to avoid confusion among his crime fiction fans. The Human Disguise and the Double Human were released to positive reviews. Publishers Weekly called the Human Disguise "wildly entertaining." The novels, set in the near future, follow a flawed detective through a ravaged landscape of Florida, investigating what appears to be a gang war. Born went to great lengths to make sure everything he talked about had some basis in scientific fact. Both of the novels were optioned by CBS Studios.

An editor from his publisher contacted Born about co-writing with television commentator Lou Dobbs. Their collaboration resulted in two novels. The first was Border War, which is about a drug cartel in Juarez, Mexico, and the federal task force trying to battle them in El Paso, Texas. The second book, Putin's Gambit, is a story about Russia hacking the US and Great Britain's financial computers to spark a financial meltdown. The Russians' motivation is to distract the West as Russia moves into Estonia.

In 2015, Born was contacted by best-selling author James Patterson about collaborating on projects. Born wrote several novellas or "book shots" with Patterson before taking over the Michael Bennett series with the novel Haunted.

Born continues to work with Patterson on Bennett novels as well as other projects. He also provides technical advice and is a commentator on different crime shows. Most notably, Born appeared on the Discovery Channel's A Crime to Remember, regarding a famous murder from the 1950s of a judge in Palm Beach County.

In 2018, Born traveled to Afghanistan to do research on a novel and work on a documentary. He spent time at Bagram Air Base and the Fenty Forward Operating Base near the Pakistani border. The documentary, Send Me, detailed the US military's effort to provide medical evacuation to allied soldiers wounded in combat. The documentary aired on PBS in October 2018 and was awarded an Emmy.

== Personal life ==
Born lives with his wife in Florida where he now writes full-time. He continues to provide technical advice, and speaks publicly about his books and other issues. Born has two children, John (a CPA) and Emily (a lawyer).
