= Taxing master =

Concept in Irish law

A Taxing master is an independent person appointed by the Irish government, pursuant to section 3 of the Court Officers Act 1926, to assess the legal costs of a party to a legal matter.

The Taxing master provides an independent and impartial process of assessment of legal costs, which endeavours to achieve a balance between the costs involved and the services rendered. The party seeking to have a bill of costs put before the Taxing master, must lodge that bill with the Taxing master's office, together with a summons to tax and an order of the court/requisition to tax.

The position of the Taxing master and his/her office is governed by the Courts (Supplemental Provisions) Act 1961. This was amended by the Civil Law (Miscellaneous Provisions) Act 2011, whereby a taxing masters's term of office is for a period not exceeding 5 years.

Every person represented by a solicitor in Ireland in a matter before the High Court is entitled to have their bill assessed by the Taxing master. Should a client feel his bill is not fair or reasonable he should ask his solicitor in writing to have the matter taxed. However, where a client of a solicitor feels they have been overcharged they should make a complaint to the Law Society of Ireland.
