= James Neal =

James Neal may refer to:

- James F. Neal (1929–2010), Watergate prosecutor
- James G. Neal, American librarian
- James Neal (ice hockey) (born 1987), NHL hockey player
- Jim Neal (1930–2011), NBA basketball player
- James Neal (artist) (1918–2011), English artist
- James E. Neal (1846–1908), Ohio politician

== See also ==
- James Neale
- James Neale (Australian politician)
- James Neill (disambiguation)
- James O'Neill (disambiguation)
