= Jim O'Neill =

Jim O'Neill may refer to:

- Jim O'Neill (baseball) (1893–1976), American baseball player
- Jim O'Neill, Baron O'Neill of Gatley (born 1957), British economist
- Jim O'Neil (ice hockey) (1913–1997), Canadian ice hockey player
- Jim O'Neill (investor), United States deputy secretary of health and human services
- Jim O'Neil (American football) (born 1978), American football coach
- Jimme O'Neill, leader of Scottish band the Silencers

== See also ==
- James O'Neill (disambiguation)
