= Coal River (Tasmania) =

River in southern Tasmania, Australia

Coal
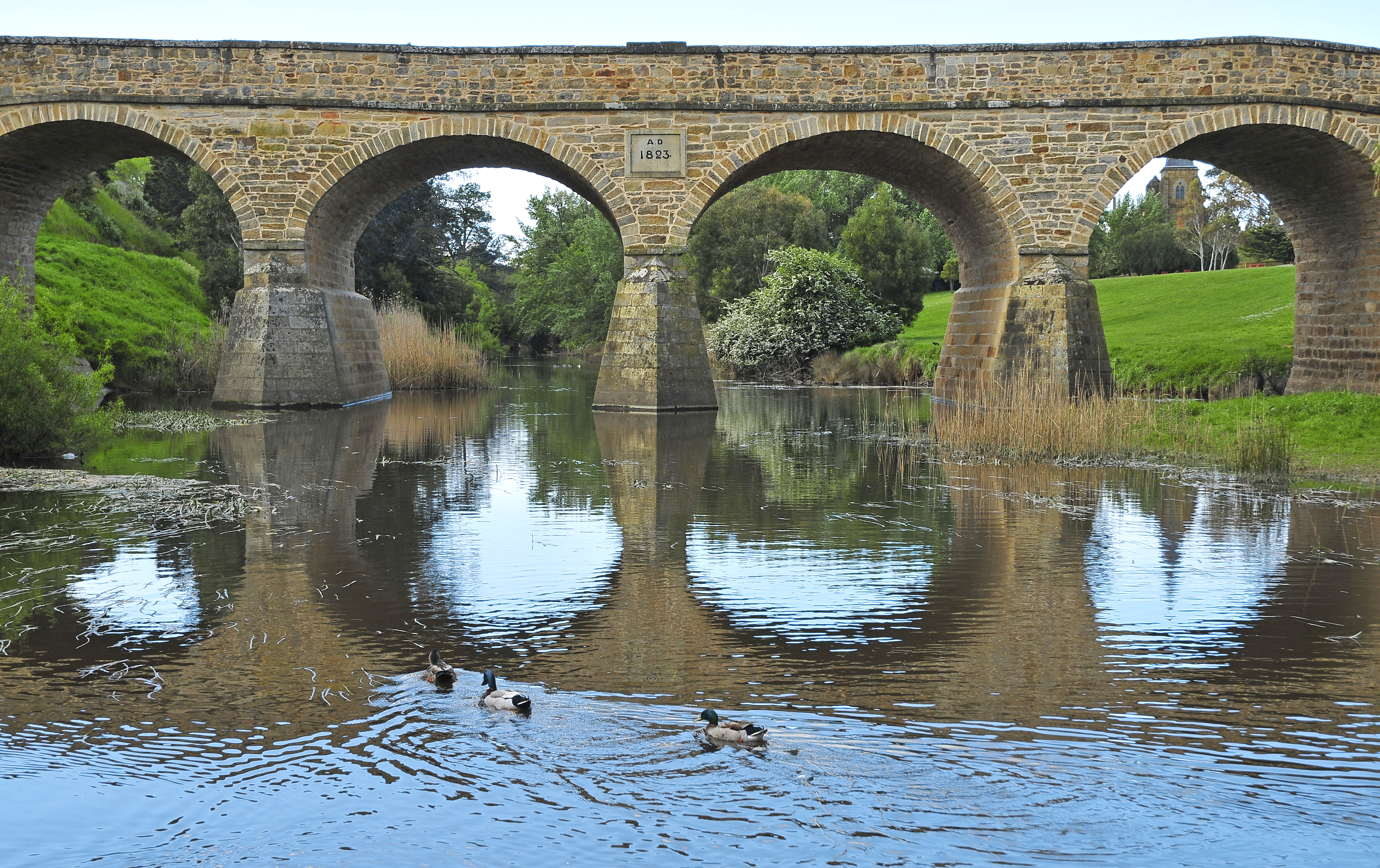
- Richmond Bridge over the river

- Location of the river mouth in Tasmania

Location
- Country: Australia
- State: Tasmania

Physical characteristics
- Source
  - location: Tunnack, Southern Midlands
  - coordinates: 42.46488°S 147.48744°E
  - elevation: c. 915 m (3,002 ft) AHD
- Mouth: Pitt Water
  - location: near Richmond, City of Clarence
  - coordinates: 42.75638°S 147.44900°E
  - elevation: 6 m (20 ft) AHD
- Length: 80 km (50 mi)
- Basin size: 780 km^{2} (300 mi^{2})
- Width
  - average: 14.5 m (48 ft)

Basin features
- Tributaries
  - left: White Kangaroo Rivulet
  - right: Native Hut Rivulet
- Waterbodies: Craigbourne Dam Reservoir
- Bridges: Richmond Bridge

The Coal River is a perennial river in southern Tasmania, Australia. Its headwaters rise near Tunnack, and it flows through the Coal River Valley and the town of Richmond, and empties into the Pitt Water.

In Richmond, the river is crossed by the historically significant Richmond Bridge, built in 1825, the oldest bridge built in Australia in current use.

== Course and features ==
The Coal River rises on the hills east of Tunnack, at an elevation of c. 915 metres (3,002 ft) AHD, and winds its way south through undulating terrain before being impounded at the Craigbourne Dam. From there the regulated river flows south through the Coal River Valley, accepting unregulated inflows from its two main tributaries, the Native Hut and White Kangaroo rivulets, before flowing through Richmond and into Pitt Water at Penna, where the ground is marshy in places, at an elevation of 6 metres (20 ft) AHD.

The river is approximately 80 kilometres (50 mi) long, north to south, (Note: An earlier source estimated that the river was 56 km (35 mi) long.) and the catchment area is approximately 780 square kilometres (300 sq mi). (Note: Another source estimated that the catchment area was 540 km^{2} (210 sq mi).) The Coal River catchment is one of the driest catchments in Tasmania, with annual rainfall averaging from 500 to 700 millimetres (20 to 28 in) across the catchment.

Since 1992, irrigators have drawn water from the Coal River to feed the Daisy Banks Dam, part of the South East Irrigation Scheme, that is delivered throughout the district by approximately 30 kilometres (19 mi) of pipelines, for use in the Coal River Valley.

== Nature reserve ==
Under the Tasmanian Nature Conservation Act (2002), a part of the Pitt Water was declared a nature reserve. The reserve is partially contained within the Pitt Water-Orielton Lagoon Ramsar Site, which, in 1983, was listed as a wetland of international importance under the Ramsar convention. The reserve is part of the South Arm Important Bird Area that forms a habitat of migratory and resident birds, is a nursery of marine life, and is an important estuarine ecosystem, and includes many unique species.

== See also ==
- List of rivers of Tasmania
- List of Ramsar sites in Australia
