= Midway Point, Tasmania =

Midway Point tipina (Southeast Tasmanian)
- Suburb
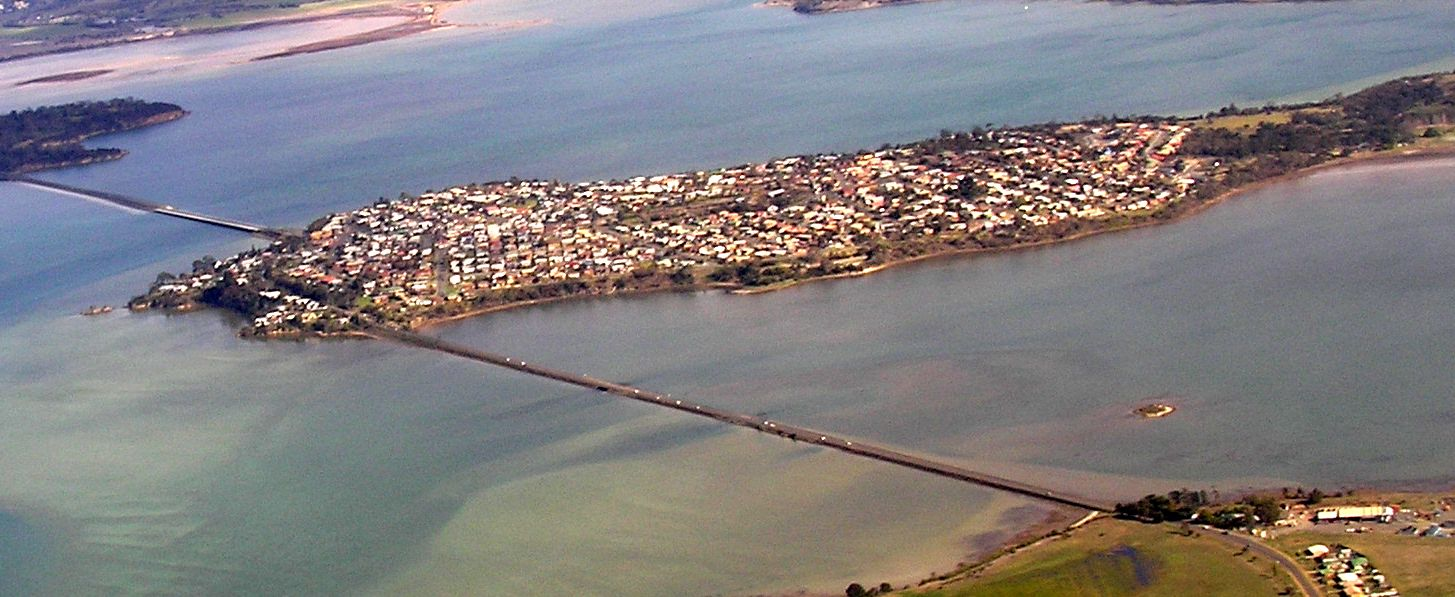
- Aerial view with causeway

- Interactive map of Midway Point
- Coordinates: 42°48′12″S 147°31′57″E
- Country: Australia
- State: Tasmania
- Region: Hobart
- City: Hobart
- LGA: Sorell
- Location: 5 km (3.1 mi) SW of Sorell; 8 km (5.0 mi) NE of Hobart Airport; 22 km (14 mi) NE of Hobart

Government
  - State electorate: Lyons
  - Federal division: Lyons

Population
  - Total: 2,859 (2016 census)
- Postcode: 7171
Suburbs around Midway Point
Penna	Penna	Penna
Pitt Water	Midway Point	Pitt Water
Pitt Water	Pitt Water	Pitt Water

Midway Point (paredarerme/palawa kani: tipina) is a residential locality in the local government area (LGA) of Sorell in the South-east LGA region of Tasmania. The locality is about 5 kilometres (3.1 mi) south-west of the town of Sorell. The 2016 census recorded a population of 2859 for the state suburb of Midway Point. It is located on a small peninsula with Orielton Lagoon on its eastern side and Pitt Water on its southern and western sides. The suburb meets the mid-way point of the Sorell Causeway from Hobart to Sorell, hence the name. Mcgees Bridge is connected to Midway Point on the Pittwater side. The suburb lies close to Hobart Airport and is approximately 21 km to Hobart via the Tasman Highway. In recent years Midway Point has become a popular commuter town for people working in Hobart.

== History ==
Midway Point was gazetted as a locality in 1957.

== Geography ==
The waters of Pittwater form the eastern, southern and western boundaries.

== Road infrastructure ==
Route A3 (Tasman Highway) runs through the southern tip of the locality.
