= Coal River Valley =

Valley in Tasmania, Australia

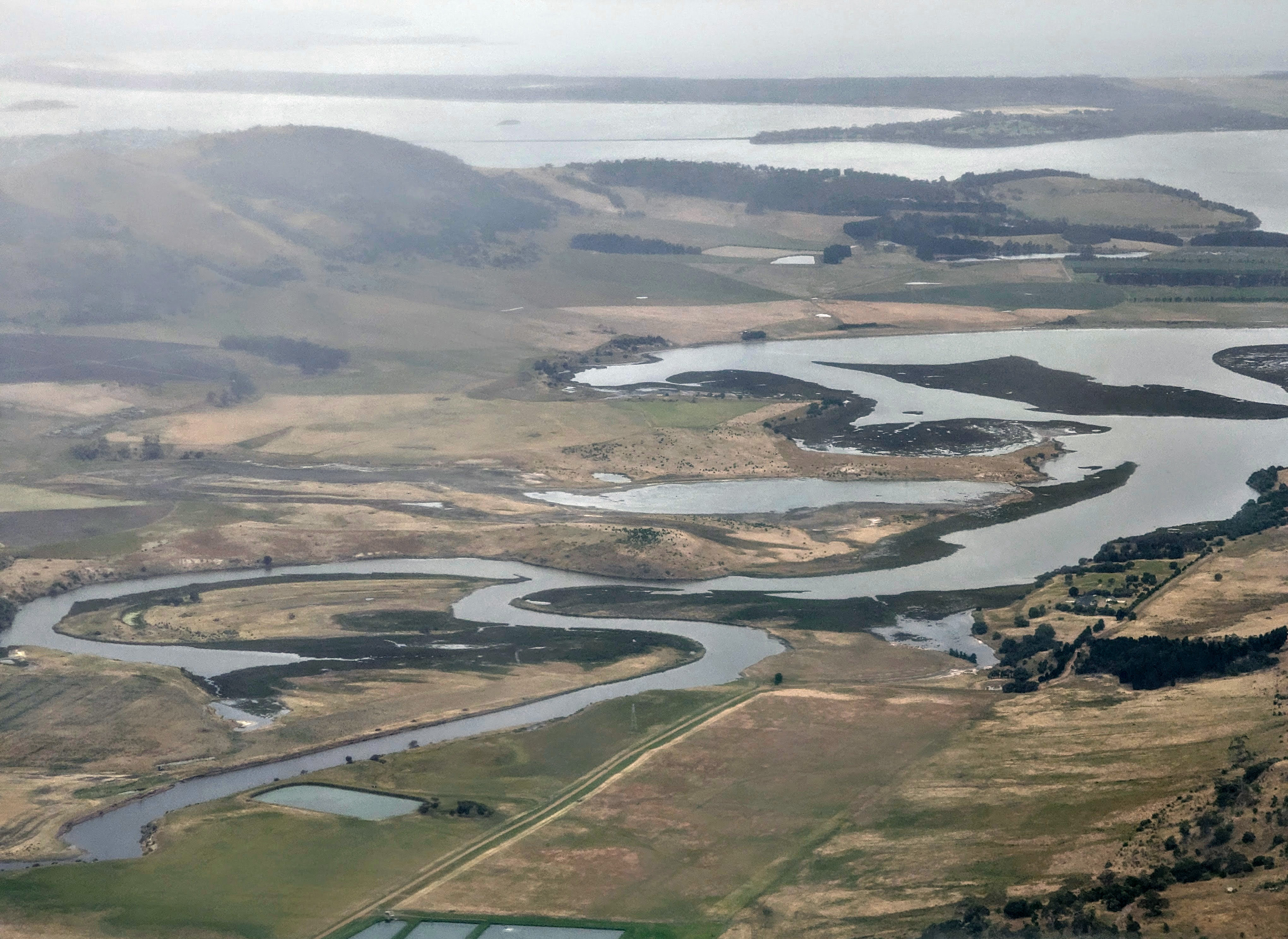
- Coal River south of Richmond

- Location within Tasmania

Geography
- Country: Australia
- State: Tasmania
- Population centers: Richmond, Colebrook, Campania, Cambridge
- Coordinates: 42°40′S 147°27′E
- River: Coal River
- Interactive map of Coal River Valley

The Coal River Valley is located in southern Tasmania, primarily within the City of Clarence, and is known for its fertile agricultural land. The valley lies to the east of Hobart, located between the Meehan Range and the Pontos Range, with the town of Richmond at its centre. Other townships in the valley include Colebrook, Campania, and Cambridge.

== Geography ==
The Coal River Valley stretches between the Meehan and Pontos mountain ranges, providing natural protection from harsh weather conditions, which contributes to its suitability for agriculture, particularly viticulture. The Coal River runs through the valley, shaping the landscape and providing water for irrigation.

The region's proximity to Hobart makes it attractive to commuters, while its relatively dry and cool climate provides excellent conditions for growing grapes and other crops. The valley is also sheltered from urban radio emissions by the Meehan Range, making it a suitable location for the University of Tasmania's Mount Pleasant Radio Observatory.

== History ==
The Coal River Valley was one of the first areas settled by British colonists outside Hobart. The town of Richmond, established in 1823, is home to the historic Richmond Bridge, Australia’s oldest stone bridge, which was built by convicts to cross the Coal River.

The valley's name originates from early discoveries of coal in the area by settlers, although the region never became a major coal-producing area. Instead, the first settlers primarily used the valley for grazing, pastureland, and crop cultivation.

== Economy ==
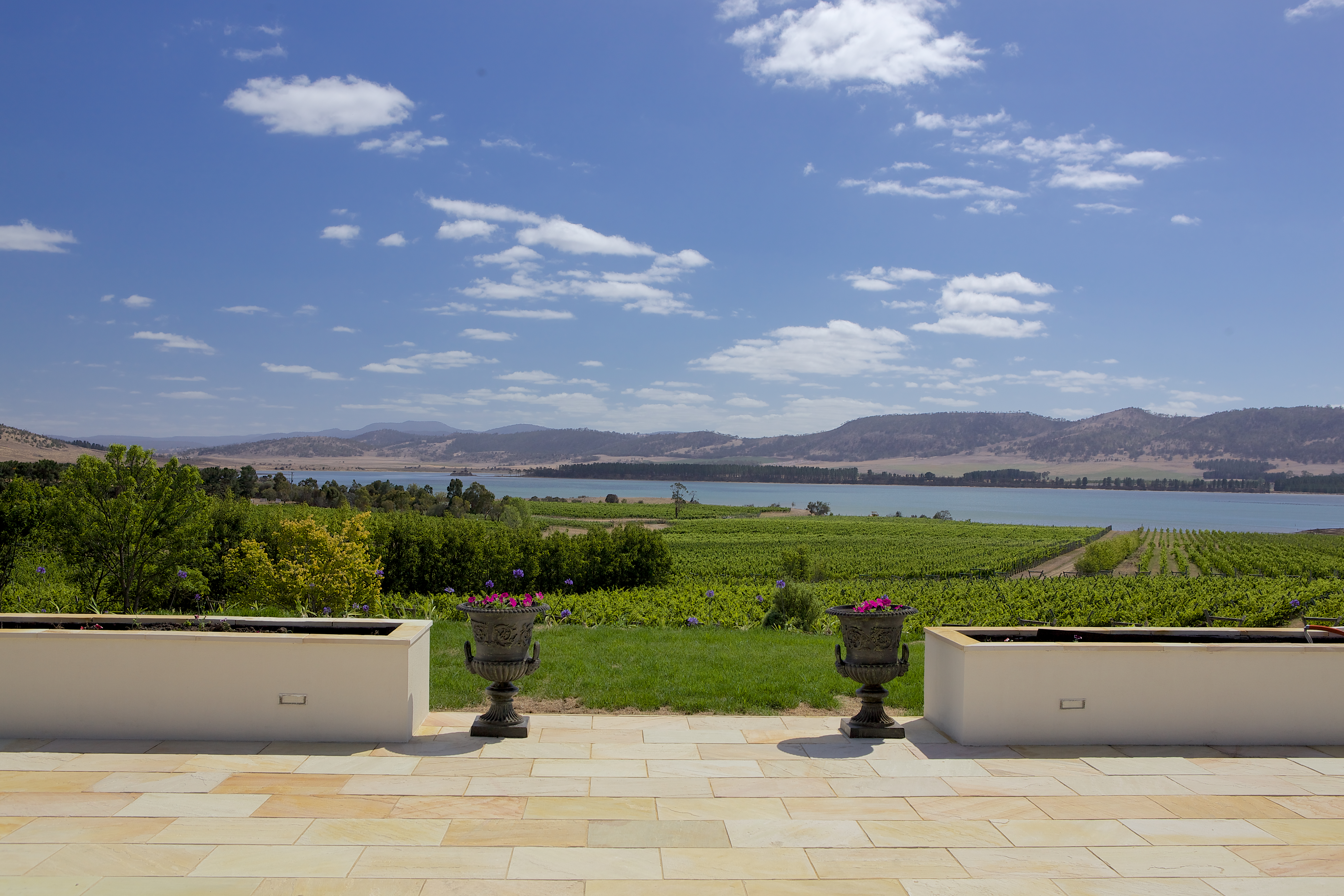
Riversdale Estate gardens

The Coal River Valley has developed a reputation for its agriculture, with a particular focus on viticulture. The valley’s cool climate and long growing season make it ideal for producing slow-maturing grapes. The valley is home to a number of vineyards and wineries, which produce cool-climate wines, particularly Pinot Noir, Chardonnay, and Sauvignon Blanc. Wineries such as Coal Valley Vineyard are well-known for their award-winning wines, attracting both domestic and international visitors.

In addition to viticulture, the valley produces other crops, including olives, cherries, and berries, and supports livestock farming. Its rich soil and sheltered position make it a diverse agricultural region.

Tourism also plays a role in the local economy. The historic town of Richmond draws many visitors each year, with its well-preserved Georgian architecture, convict heritage, and landmarks such as the Richmond Bridge and the Old Hobart Town model village. Wine tours, food festivals, and scenic drives through the vineyards are also tourist attractions in the valley.

== Radio Observatory ==
The Coal River Valley’s sheltered position behind the Meehan Range provides a unique environment for radio astronomy. The Mount Pleasant Radio Observatory, operated by the University of Tasmania, is located in the valley. Its location away from the radio emissions of Hobart makes it suitable for sensitive astronomical observations. The observatory plays a role in scientific research and education, particularly in the fields of radio astronomy and astrophysics.

== Tourism ==
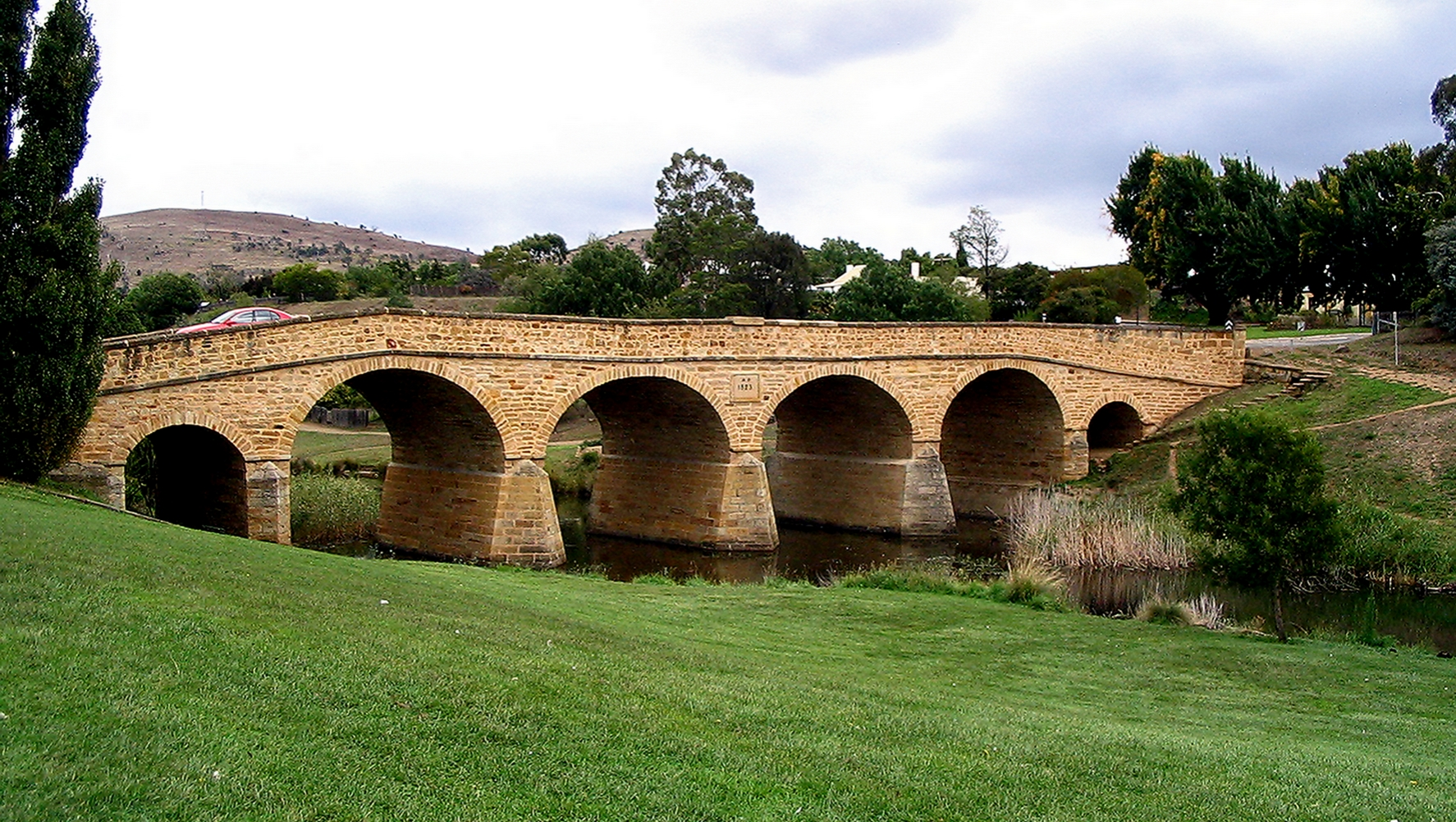
Richmond Bridge is Australia's oldest bridge

Richmond, with its convict history and heritage buildings, is one of Tasmania’s most visited tourist destinations. The town is home to Australia’s oldest Catholic church, St John's Catholic Church, and the Richmond Gaol, which offers insight into early convict life.

Wine tourism is another draw to the Coal River Valley. Several of the region’s wineries offer cellar door tastings and vineyard tours, and wine festivals held throughout the year highlight the valley's wines.

The valley’s proximity to Hobart makes it a popular destination for day trips.

== Transport ==
The Coal River Valley is a 20–30 minute drive from Hobart via the Tasman Highway or Richmond Road. Public transport links are limited, so most visitors travel by car to explore the valley and its attractions.

== See also ==
- List of valleys of Australia
- Richmond Bridge (Tasmania)
