= Craigbourne Dam =

Dam in Tasmania, Australia

- Location of the dam in Tasmania
- Interactive map of Craigbourne Dam
- Country: Australia
- Location: Coal River Valley, Tasmania
- Coordinates: 42°33′09″S 147°23′38″E
- Purpose: Irrigation; Potable water supply
- Status: Operational
- Opening date: 1986
- Built by: Roche Bros.
- Owner: Tasmanian Irrigation Schemes

Dam and spillways
- Type of dam: Gravity dam
- Impounds: Coal River
- Height: 25 m (82 ft)
- Length: 247 m (810 ft)
- Dam volume: 25×10^{3} m^{3} (880×10^{3} cu ft)
- Spillway type: Uncontrolled
- Spillway capacity: 2,300 m^{3}/s (81,000 cu ft/s)

Reservoir
- Total capacity: 12,500 ML (10,100 acre⋅ft)
- Catchment area: 241 km^{2} (93 sq mi)
- Surface area: 210 ha (520 acres)
- Normal elevation: 166 m (545 ft) AHD

The Craigbourne Dam is a gravity dam across the Coal River, located in the Coal River Valley area of the south-east region Tasmania, Australia. Completed in 1986, the resultant reservoir was established for the purposes of irrigation of the Coal River Valley and for the supply of potable water to the towns in the area.

== Overview ==
The concrete dam wall is 25 metres (82 ft) high and 247 metres (810 ft) long. When full, the reservoir has capacity of 12,500 megalitres (10,100 acre⋅ft) and covers 210 hectares (520 acres), drawn from a catchment area of 241 square kilometres (93 sq mi). The uncontrolled spillway has a flow capacity of 2,300 cubic metres per second (81,000 cu ft/s). The reservoir supplies irrigation to the South East Irrigation District in the Coal River Valley.

The dam was built by Roche Bros., on behalf of the Rivers and Water Supply Commission of Tasmania, and is now owned by Tasmanian Irrigation Schemes Pty Limited. Fishing is permitted at all times of the year in designated areas and the reservoir is stocked with rainbow trout, brook trout, Atlantic salmon and adult brown trout.

== See also ==
- List of reservoirs and dams in Tasmania
