= Pittwater (disambiguation) =

Pittwater is a body of water extending south from Broken Bay.

Pittwater may also refer to:

- Electoral district of Pittwater, New South Wales state electorate
- Pittwater Council, former local government area
- Pittwater Park
- Pittwater Road
- Pitt Water, Tasmania
