= South Arm Important Bird Area =

Important Bird Area in Tasmania, Australia

Coordinates: 42°52′07″S 147°31′55″E

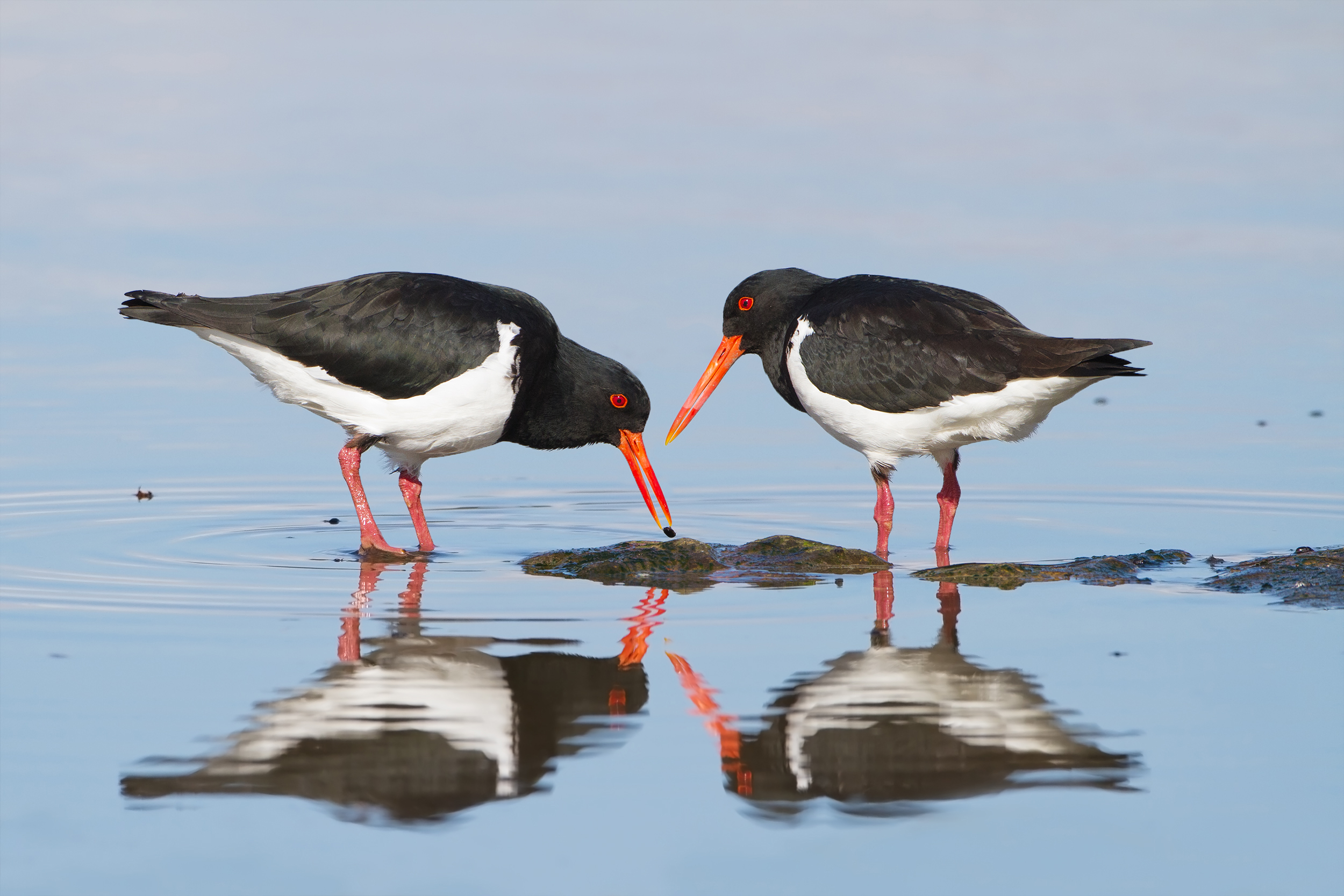
The IBA is an important area for pied oystercatchers

The South Arm Important Bird Area is a disjunct tract of mainly intertidal land on the eastern outskirts of Hobart, Tasmania, Australia.

== Description ==
The site comprises several separate tidal inlets, with a collective total area of 46 km^{2}, that together form a diverse and extensive system of wetlands providing habitat for large numbers of waders, or shorebirds. The components include Ralphs Bay, Mortimer Bay, Calvert's Lagoon, South Arm Neck, Barilla Bay, Orielton Lagoon, the seaward side of the Sorell Causeway over Pitt Water, and Pipe Clay Lagoon in Frederick Henry Bay. These are mainly estuarine sand and mud flats with significant areas of saltmarsh. The system is the southernmost destination for migratory waders in the East Asian – Australasian Flyway.

=== Birds ===
The wetland system has been identified by BirdLife International as an Important Bird Area (IBA) because it supports well over 1% of the global population of pied oystercatchers. Other waders using the wetlands in relatively large numbers include red-necked stints, curlew sandpipers, Far Eastern curlews and sooty oystercatchers.

=== Other animals ===
The Sorell Causeway and the rocky shoreline of Pitt Water have the largest concentration of the endemic viviparous sea star Patiriella vivipara. The saltmarsh around Barilla Bay is one of the few Tasmanian localities of the rare chequered blue butterfly (Theclinesthes serpentata).
