= Sorell Causeway =

Bridge in Tasmania, Australia

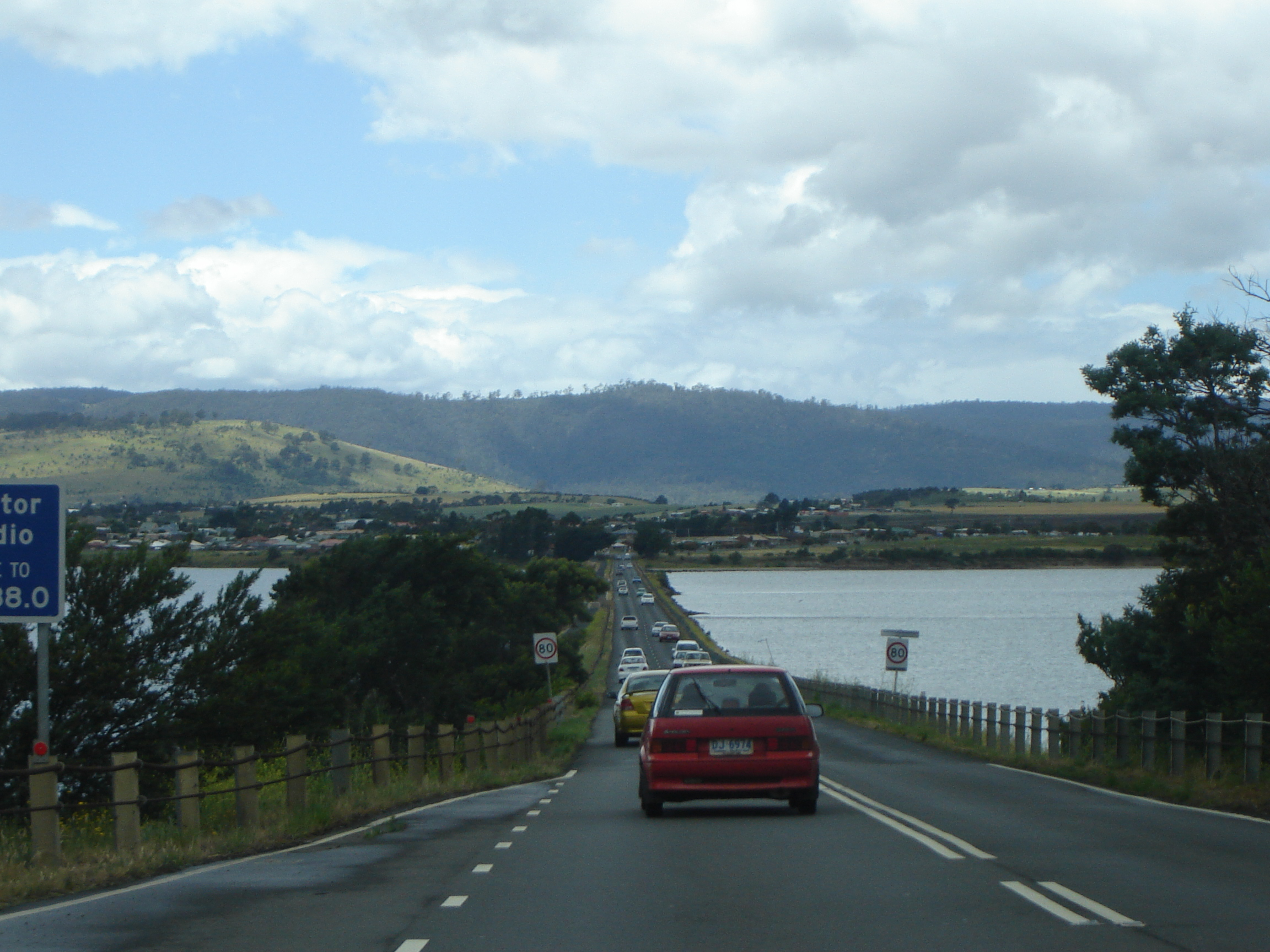
- The western approach
- Coordinates: 42°47′53″S 147°32′40″E
- Carries: Tasman Highway
- Crosses: Orielton Lagoon
- Locale: Hobart, Tasmania, Australia
- Maintained by: Department of Infrastructure, Energy and Resources

Characteristics
- Design: Causeway

History
- Opened: 1872

Location
- Interactive map of Sorell Causeway

The Sorell Causeway is a causeway that carries the Tasman Highway across Pitt Water-Orielton Lagoon, from the western side of Midway Point to Sorell in the south-east of Tasmania, Australia. The causeway and adjacent McGees Bridge provide vital links between Hobart and two of Tasmania's principal tourist attractions - Port Arthur Historic Site on the Tasman Peninsula and the picturesque East Coast via the Tasman Highway.

== History ==
In colonial times, the Richmond Bridge had been the primary crossing point of the Coal River on the road from Hobart to Sorell and beyond to the Tasman Peninsula and Port Arthur.

It had been decided much earlier that if a crossing at Pitt Water could be made, it would considerably reduce the time to reach Sorell. The engineering was difficult, but with a ready supply of convict labour on hand, the causeway was constructed with main force. It was finally completed in 1872.

The Sorell Causeway is the second such convict-built causeway in the South-East of Tasmania, and is similar to the causeway section of the former Bridgewater Bridge across the River Derwent.

== Description ==
In recent years it has undergone massive repairs and modifications. It has been decided that there needed to be a better flow of tidal water from Pitt Water and Orielton Lagoon into the open sea as the stagnation was causing outbreaks of Blue-Green Algae which was poisoning the other marine species there. As a result, sluice conduits were cut into the lagoon, and a new pile system was created, to turn longer sections of the causeway into actual bridges.

Ever since its construction it has been a major route of access from Hobart to the east coast and the Tasman Peninsula, and is now a section of the Tasman Highway.
