= Richmond, Tasmania =

Richmond
- Town
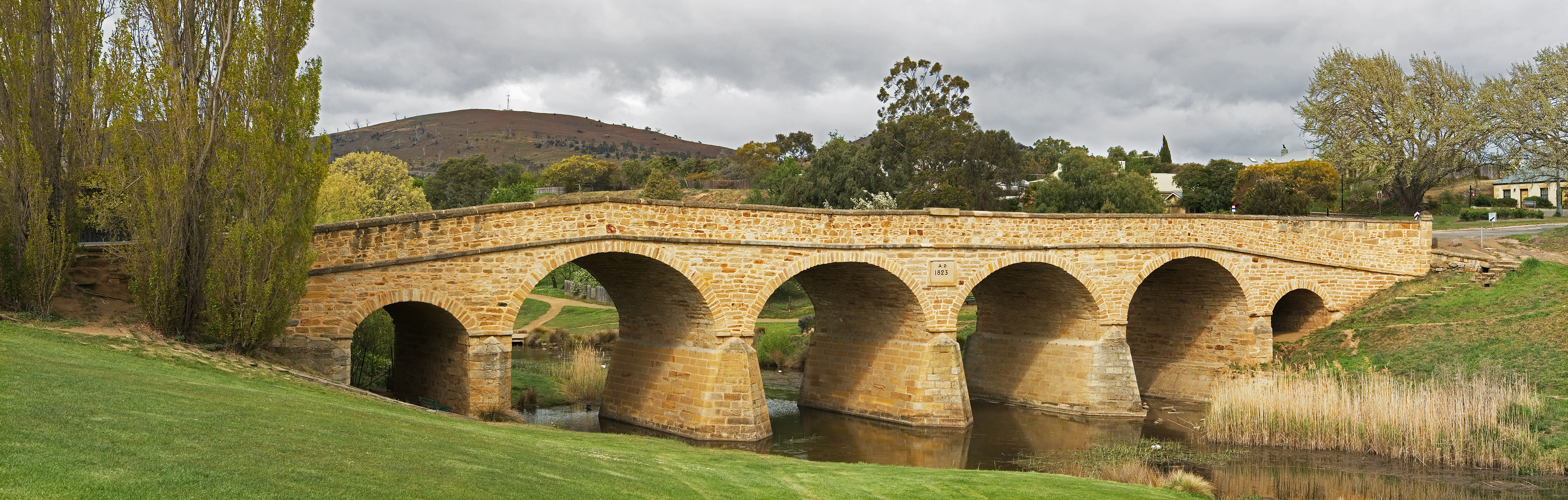
- Richmond Bridge

- Coordinates: 42°44′S 147°26′E
- Country: Australia
- State: Tasmania
- LGA: City of Clarence
- Location: 27 km (17 mi) NE of Hobart; 24 km (15 mi) E of Bridgewater

Government
  - State electorate: Lyons
  - Federal division: Lyons

Population
  - Total: 880 (2006 census)
- Postcode: 7025

Richmond is a town in Tasmania about 25 km north-east of Hobart, in the Coal River region, between the Midland Highway and Tasman Highway. At the 2006 census, Richmond had a population of 880.

Richmond's most famous landmark is the Richmond Bridge, built in 1823 to 1825, around the time of the town's first settlement. It is Australia's oldest bridge still in use.

The town was initially part of the route between Hobart and Port Arthur until the Sorell Causeway was constructed in 1872.

Present-day Richmond is best known as being preserved as it was at that time. It is a vibrant tourist town, with many of the sandstone structures still standing. Many of these structures are built in the Georgian style.

== History ==
Richmond was initially established as a pioneering district within the Van Diemen's Land penal colony. Richmond later developed as a police district for the surrounding region after Governor George Arthur appointed a number of paid magistrates to oversee penal discipline in 1827. Arthur implemented this measure as a way of increasing penal order, punishing crime and keeping an accurate record of the movements and behaviour of all convicts in attempt to hold the colony up as an orderly colony, enforcing strict convict discipline. Consequently, Richmond grew as a centre of local government with a centralised justice system, holding council and court hearings from the Coal River Valley to Campania and Colebrook. According to historian Peter Macfie, there was a high degree of prejudice among the senior public figures of Richmond toward the convicts, which resulted in a 'caste system' within the community – something that was maintained in the region through most of the nineteenth century. Immigrant settlers mostly occupied the estates within the township, whereas emancipists eventually settled on farms on the fringes of the township.

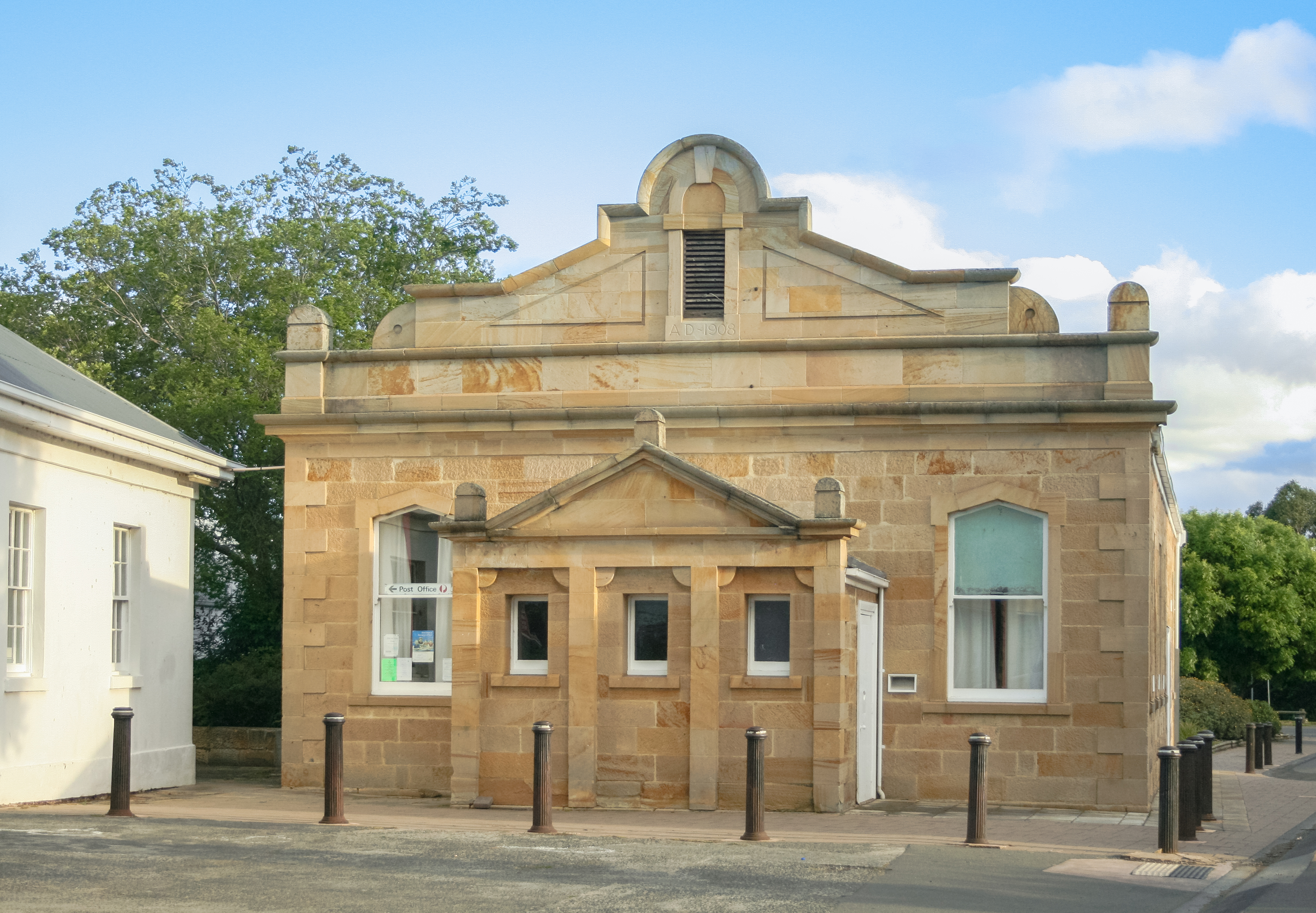
Richmond Town Hall

The Grass Tree Hill Road and Governor Arthur's Road leading into Richmond was built from 1833 to 1838 by groups of convicts known as ‘Chain Gangs’. These prisoners were sentenced to day labouring near the town and were employed in construction within the localised area. They frequently experienced shortages of food and clothing, which lead many of the men to steal from each other as well as from neighbouring houses. Prisoners also lay kangaroo traps as a means of supplementing rations. Anyone that was found to be stealing or was caught laying traps was severely punished. In 1834 and 1835, there were a number of resistance efforts in response to the shortages. Some men refused to attend church, refused to labour and there was even a rebellion led by five prisoners who wielded their picks against authorities. Many of the Georgian style buildings which are present in the township today were constructed by these convict gangs, including the Bridge, the Court House and the Gaol.

The name given to the region was the Coal River district. Lieutenant-Governor William Sorell was the first to take steps to form a town and later he took up land there himself. The Land Commissioners surveyed land for a township in the mid 1820s.

James Backhouse reported Richmond had a court house, a gaol, a windmill and about thirty houses by 1832. Backhouse visited the town again in February 1834 and reported Richmond had nearly doubled in size. The court house was built in 1825–26 and the northern part of the gaol in 1825. Richmond Post Office opened on 1 June 1832. Richmond bridge was built in 1823, using convict labour, and is known as the largest stone span bridge in Australia.

Low-grade coal was found, on the bank of the Coal River downstream, from the later site of Richmond, by the colonial surveyor, James Meehan, in November 1803. It was mined there, as early as 1805. A short-lived underground coal mine, the Lowland Coal Mine, was developed on the 'Lowlands' property, in 1840, but it had ailed in 1842.

== Religion ==
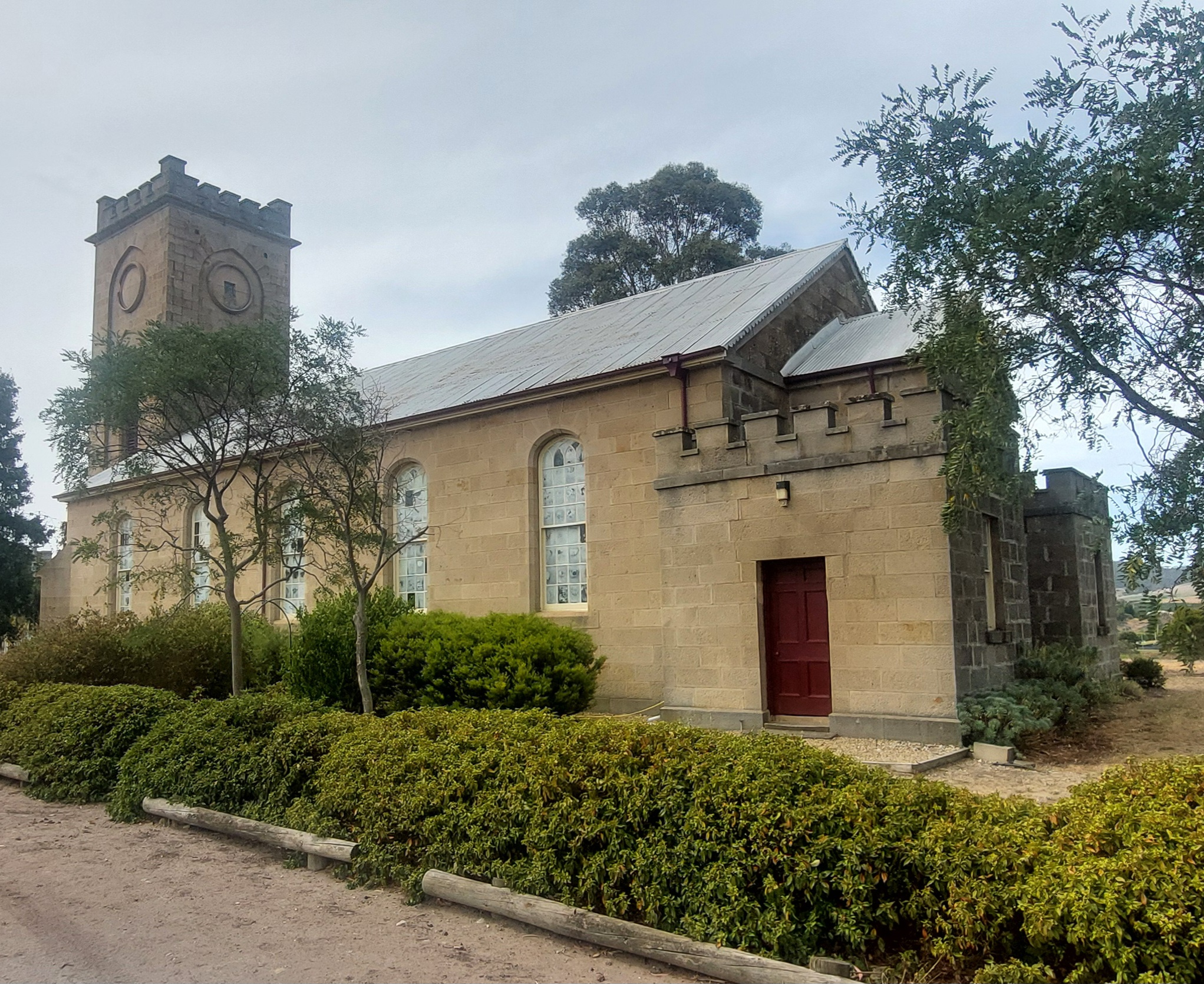
St Luke's Church

St John's Catholic church was built in 1836, and is considered the oldest Roman Catholic church in Australia. The Catholic churches in Sorell, Triabunna and Koonya form part of St John's parish.

St Luke's was built in 1834–1836 and is the oldest Anglican Church in Australia. The clock mounted in the church tower chimes the hour is manually wound by a group of volunteers. The clock was previously from St David's Church in Hobart, which was demolished to build St David's Cathedral. St Luke's cemetery is located on Wellington Street, just before Paramore Street. The foundation stone for St Luke's was laid on 3 February 1834 by Governor Arthur and it is considered one of the finest churches designed by John Lee Archer.

== Tourist attractions ==
Some notable tourist attractions in Richmond are the Richmond Bridge, the Richmond Gaol, Richmond Court House, Hobart Zoo and Aquarium (formerly Zoodoo Wildlife Park), a model of Old Hobart Town in the 1800s, and numerous old and heritage-listed buildings and parks.

== Gallery ==
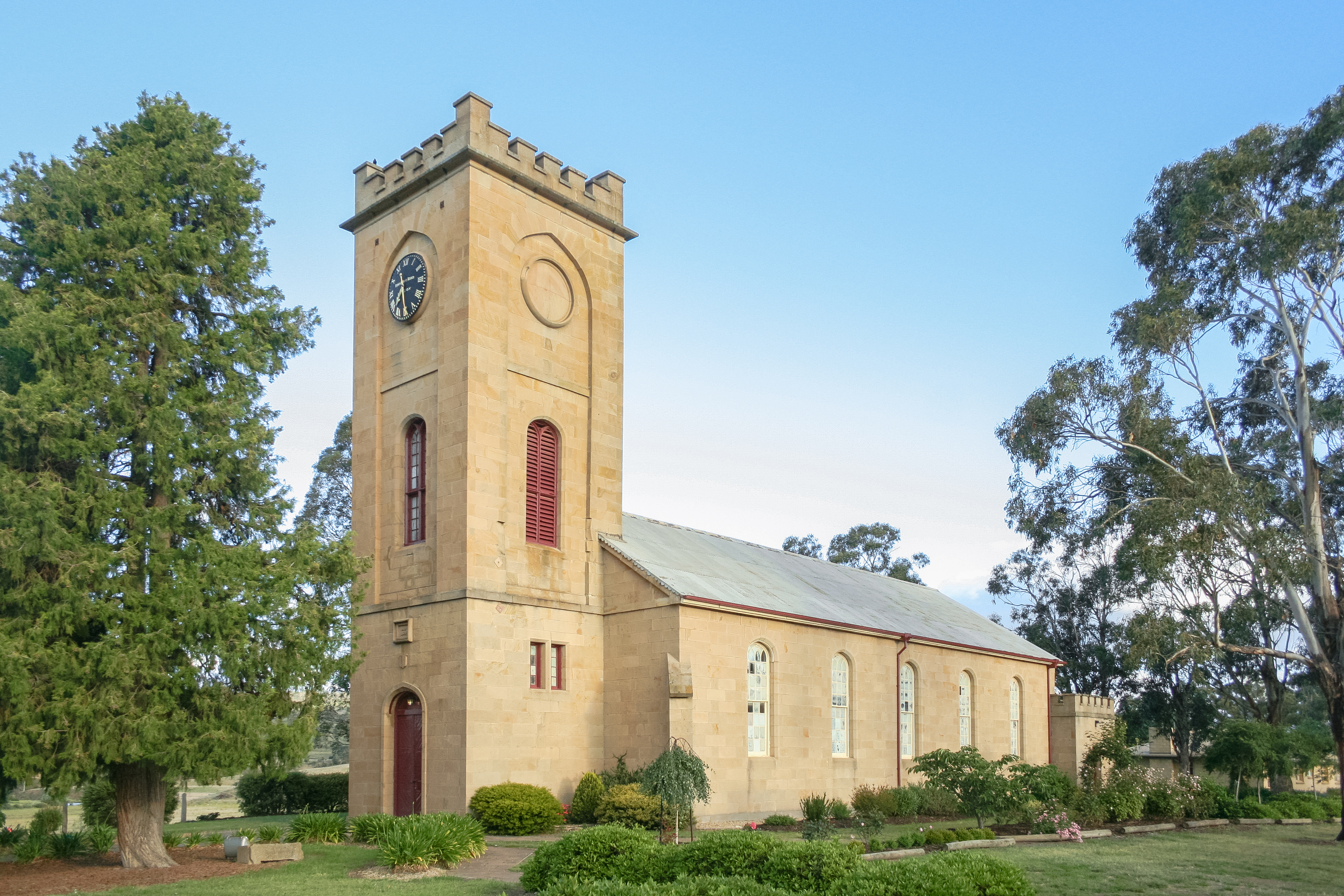
St Luke Anglican Church

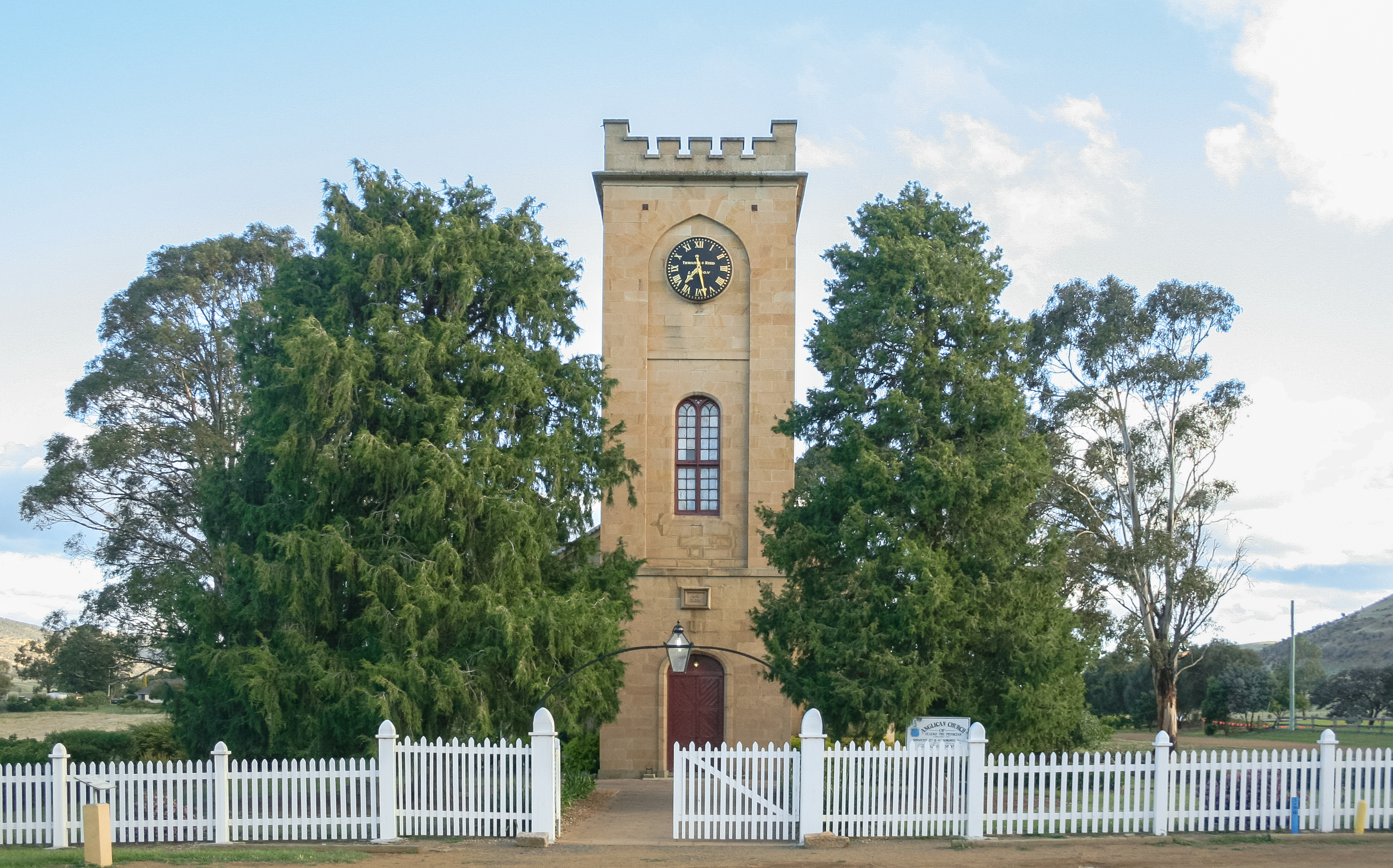
Another view of St Luke

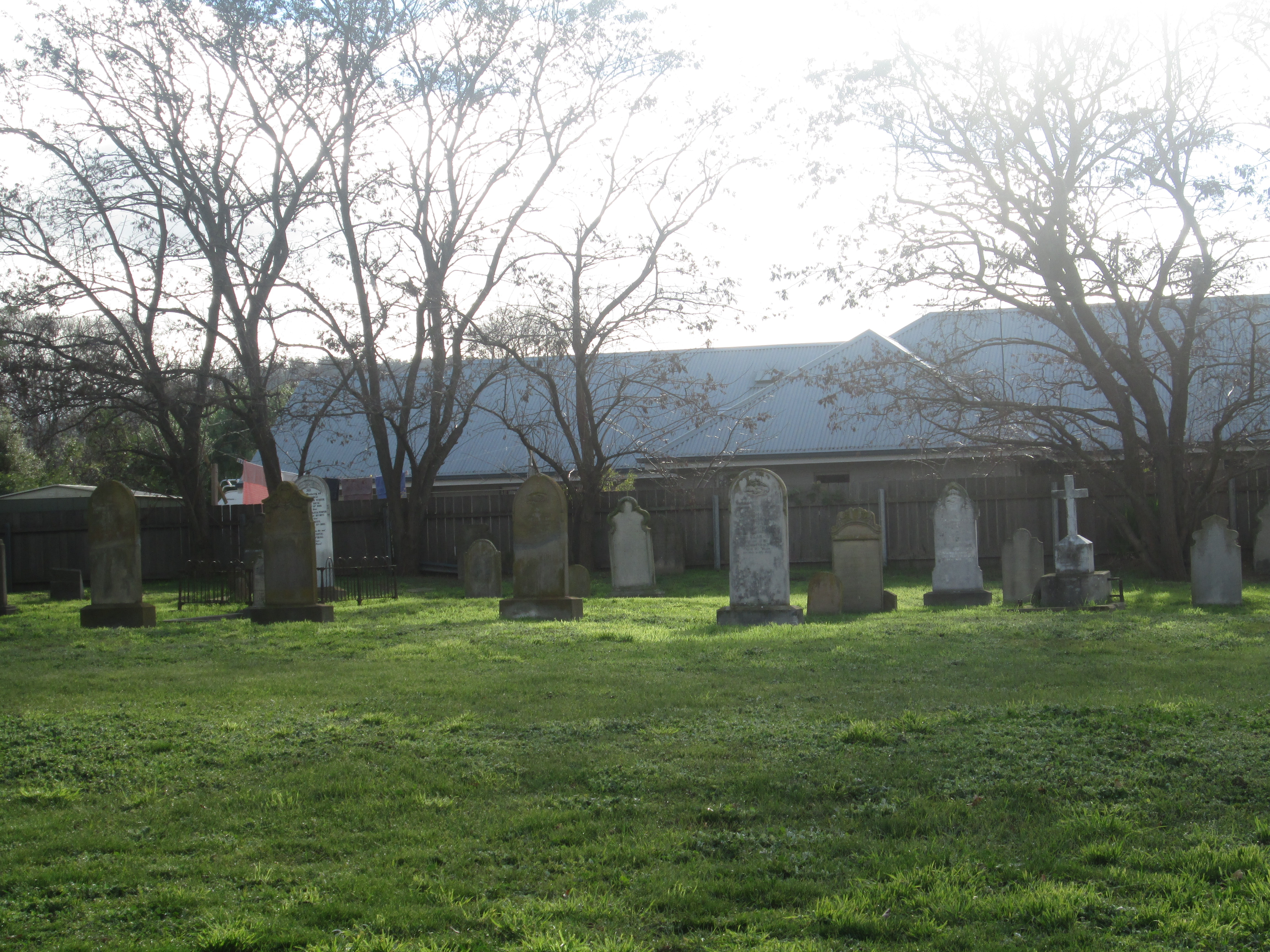
One of the smaller Richmond Cemeteries

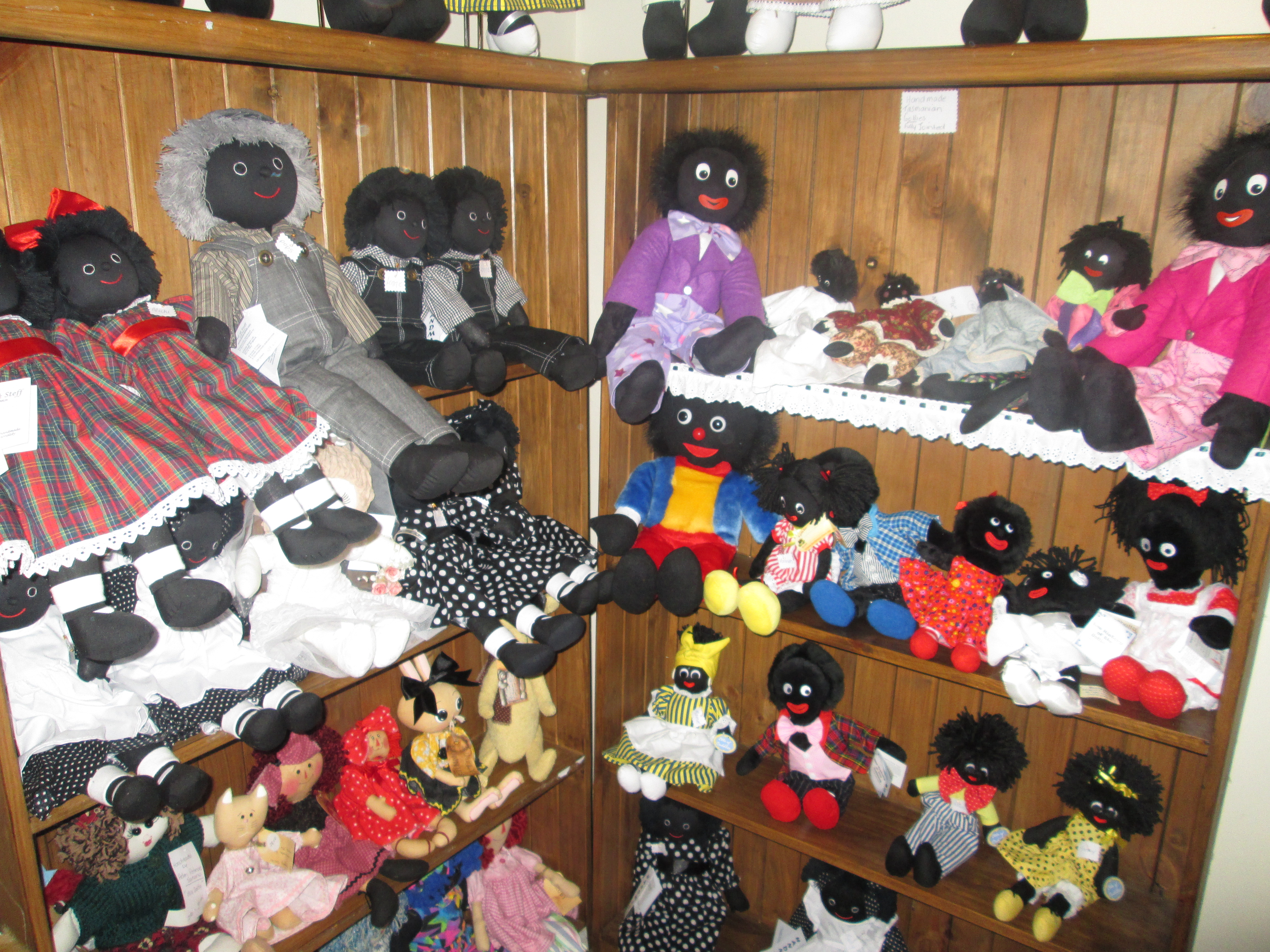
The Teddy Bear Shop

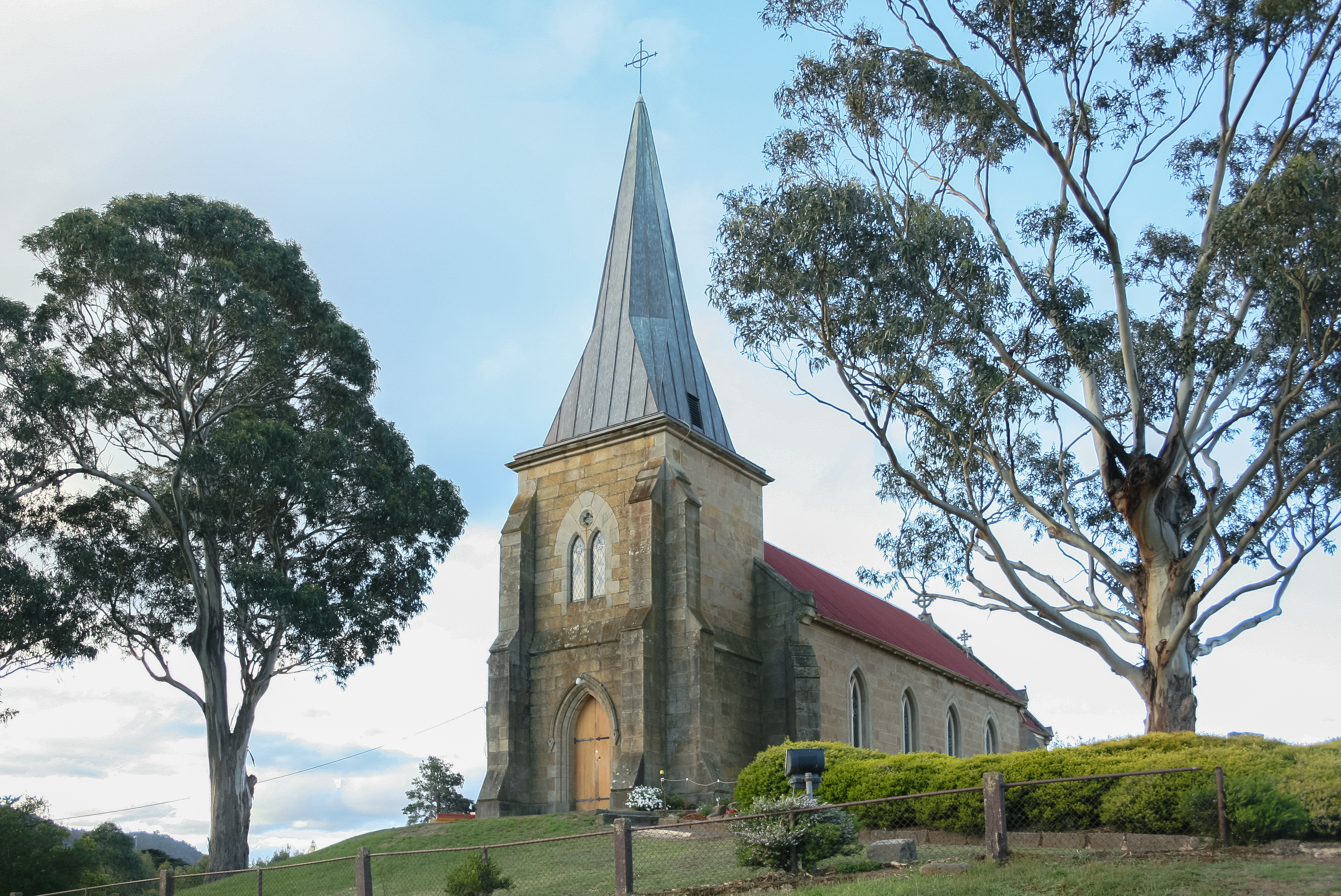
St. John's church
