= Richmond Gaol =

Tourist attraction in Tasmania

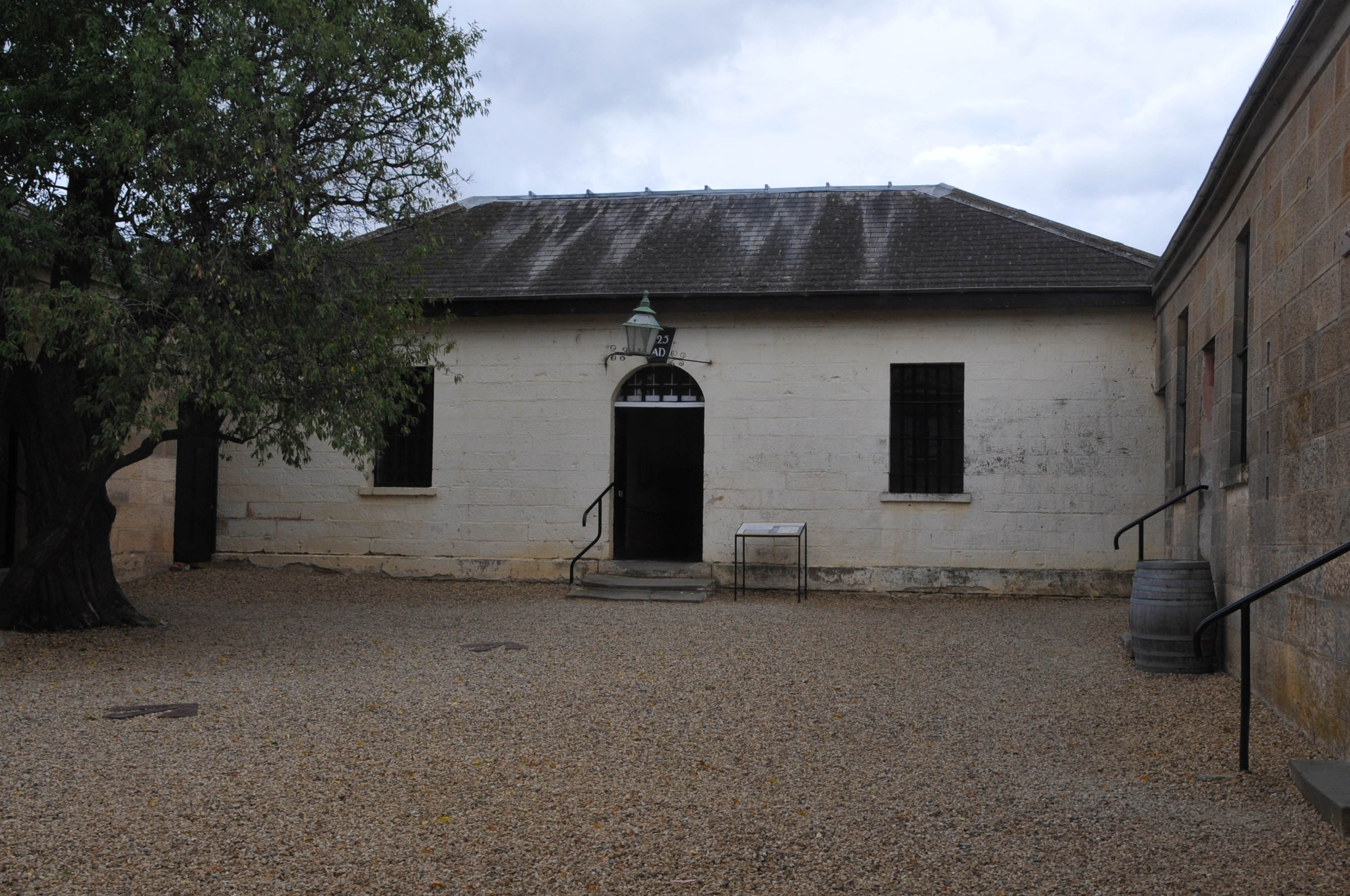
- Interactive map of Richmond Gaol
- Location: Richmond, Tasmania; 42°44′11″S 147°26′20″E
- Status: Historic Site
- Security class: Maximum Security
- Opened: 1825
- Closed: 1945
- Managed by: Tasmanian National Parks and Wildlife Service

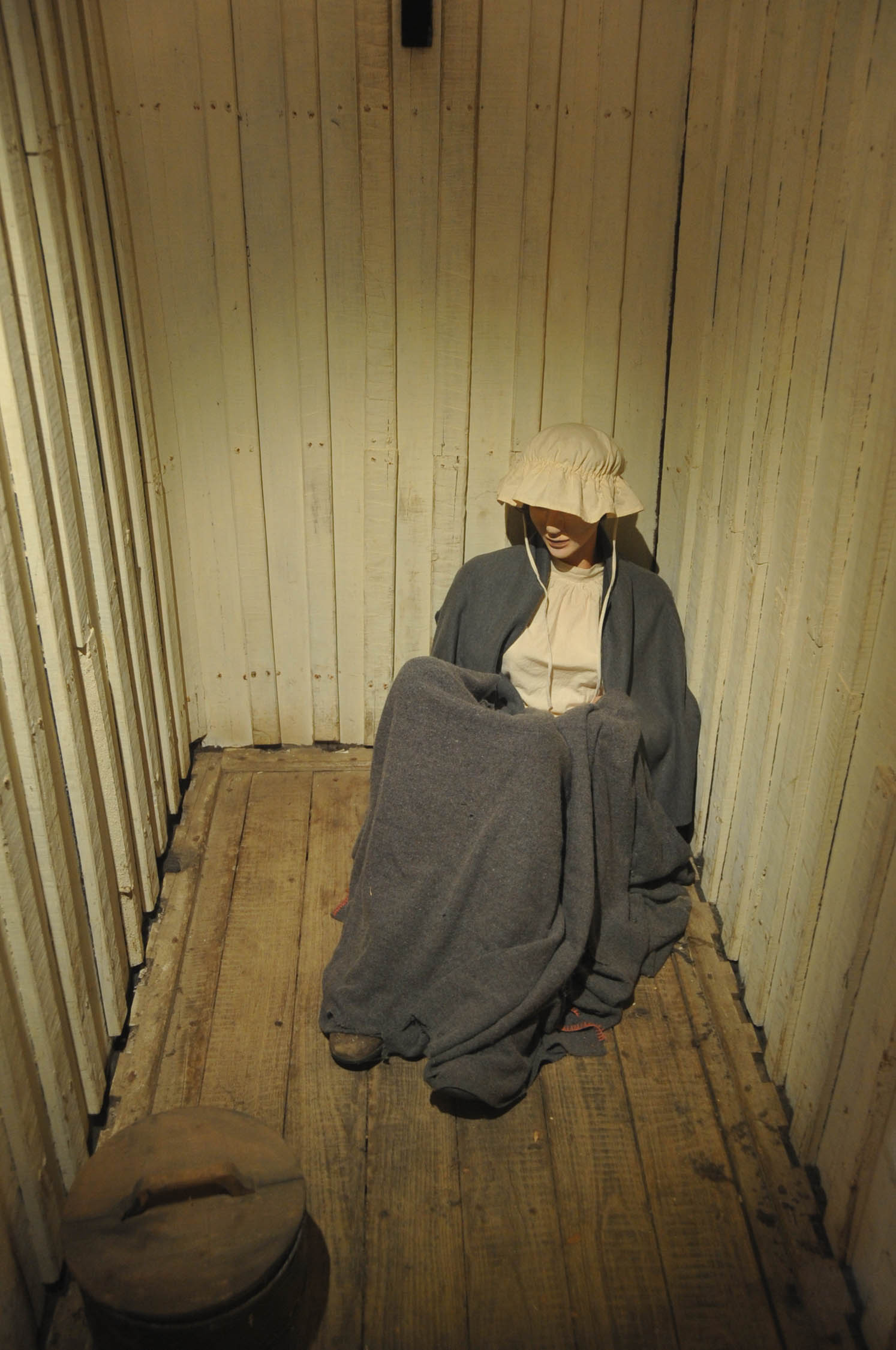
Solitary confinement cell

The Richmond Gaol is a convict era building and tourist attraction in Richmond, Tasmania, and is the oldest intact gaol in Australia. Building of the gaol commenced in 1825, and predates the establishment of the penal colony at Port Arthur in 1833. One of the tasks completed by the convicts who were held at Richmond Gaol was the construction of Richmond Bridge.

Most of the gaol buildings have not been changed since convict times. They include an example of a female solitary confinement cell, measuring 2 metres (6.6 ft)s by 1 metre (3.3 ft)

The buildings include a chain gang sleeping rooms, a flogging yard, a cookhouse and holding rooms. The buildings also feature historical relics and documents.

== Beginnings ==
Settlers of Hobart Town were moving away in order to search for more farming land. The area of Sorell was quite established and it was being extended into the area soon to be known as Richmond. In the meantime, convicts were used as virtual slave labour to create all kinds of infrastructure like roads, bridges and public buildings.

Finally the township of Richmond was proclaimed in 1824.

A court house to service the police district in the area was built in 1825 and this was the start of the gaol building.

== Expanding the gaol ==
By the 1830s the gaol was horribly overcrowded because of it being so small - 19 square metres - and prisoners were forced to sleep in the passageways.

The two storey building began construction in 1832 and completed in 1833. The upper level served as the Gaoler's Residence with the downstairs section being storage.

In 1835, the Eastern and Western wings were added and it's the Western Wing which serves as the entrance to the building to this very day. Once these were completed it created a better segregation between male and female prisoners. The female wing contained a new cookhouse and bake oven.

In an attempt to negate the escapes and escape attempts from the gaol, it was surrounded with a stone wall. This was done in 1840.

== Decline, closure and rescue ==
By the mid-1850s, the place was only being used as a Watch House due to the cessation of convict transportation. In 1861, it was controlled by the municipal police and when they were removed to become centralised in Hobart, the gaol simply became a group of holding cells.

By the end of the 1920s, it was abandoned.

In 1945, the gaol was rescued by becoming a State Reserve and through legislation in the 1970s, it was run by the National Parks and Wildlife Service, meaning the gaol could be classified as an historic site under their control.

== Solitary cells ==
The gaol had solitary cells (or solitary confinement). The idea was you could be place in pitch darkness and complete silence for a period of 24 hours to thirty days. The time period depended upon what you were charged with.

== Flagellation Yard ==
Hangings never took place at Richmond Gaol but flagellations (whippings) did. Convicts would be strapped to a wood frame, and the lashes meted out accordingly. In some colonies, it seems a kidney belt would be used to minimise harm to the kidneys but from the illustrations of flagellations taking place in the yard, this seemed to be absent.

Even though some people in Hobart Town would be sentenced to 500 lashes, the number was a little more sympathetic in Richmond. It would start at 25, with the number occasionally hitting 75 or 100. As painful as it sounds, salt would be rubbed into the flesh wounds created by the cat-o-nine tails, but this was actually done to minimise infection.

The lashings at Richmond Gaol (or any other gaol which undertook whippings - i.e.: Adelaide Gaol, Melbourne Gaol) would have a medical officer standing by to check whether the persons' life would be in danger. Should the person be deemed unfit to continue, they would be taken down. However, once they were fit enough again, they would be strapped back up to have the remainder of their sentence handed out.

== Ghosts ==
Like most old sites like this, it has its fair share of ghost stories. The third cell in the Men's Block is apparently quite well known for the terrible effect it can have on people in there. People claim to hear moaning and deep sighs and some people claim they get a cold shiver as they approach.

== See also ==
- Penal transportation
