= Pitt Water =

Region near Sorell, in Tasmania

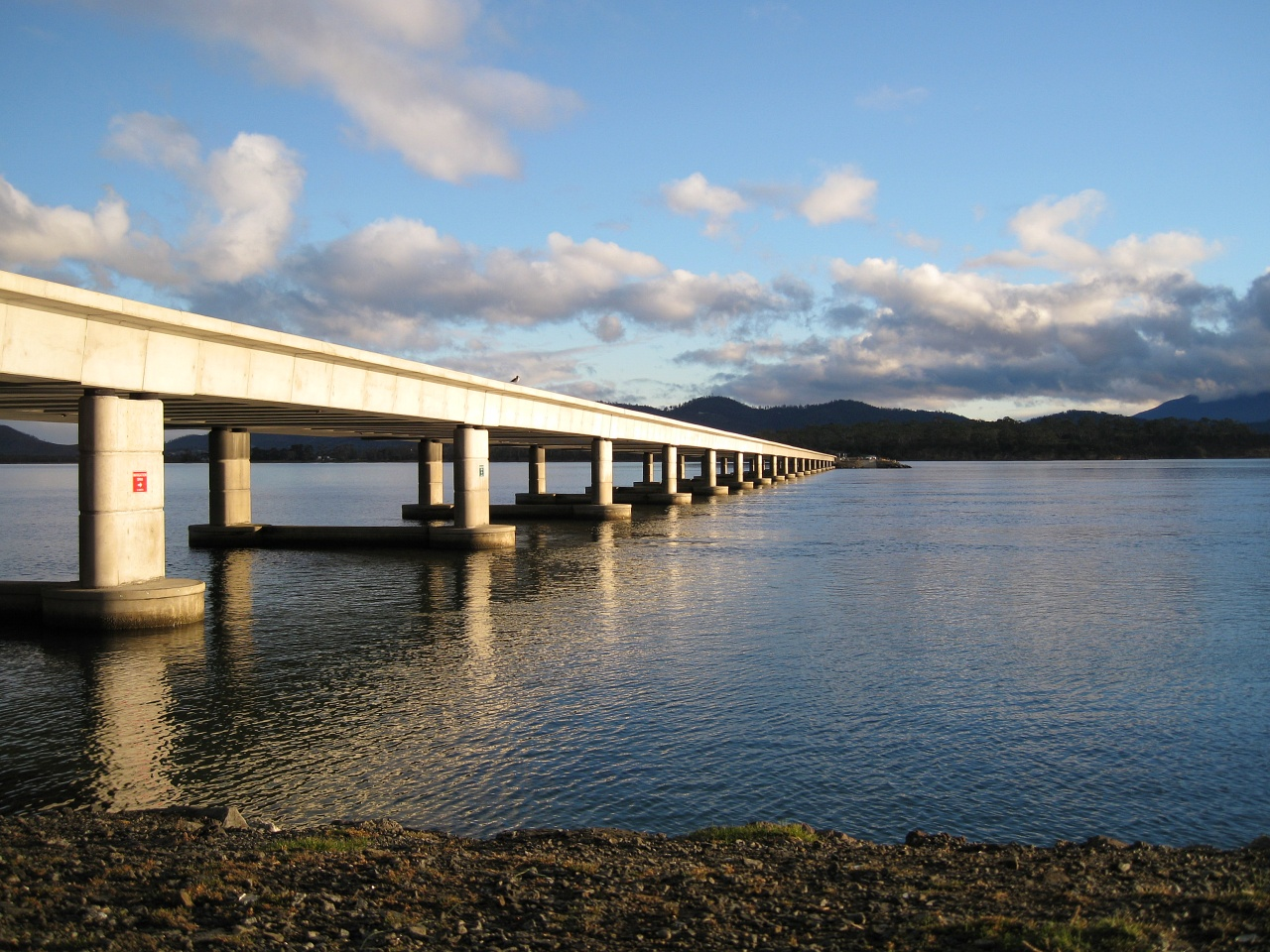
- McGees Bridge crossing Pitt Water

- Location in Tasmania
- Location: South East Tasmania
- Coordinates: 42°48′14.83″S 147°30′31.65″E
- Type: Estuary
- Etymology: Named after Chancellor of the Exchequer, William Pitt
- Primary inflows: Coal River
- River sources: Coal River
- Primary outflows: Frederick Henry Bay
- Ocean/sea sources: Tasman Sea
- Basin countries: Australia
- Designation: Pitt Water–Orielton Lagoon Ramsar site
- Surface area: 43.1 square kilometres (16.6 sq mi)
- Max. depth: 20 metres (66 ft)
- Water volume: ~101.8 gigalitres (3.60×10^{9} cu ft)
- Residence time: ~4.36 tidal cycles
- Frozen: No
- Islands: Woody Island
- Sections/sub-basins: Orielton Lagoon, Iron Creek Bay
- Settlements: Midway Point, Penna, Sorell

Pitt Water is a region and estuarine area near Sorell, in southeastern Tasmania. It forms part of the Pembroke Land District and includes significant natural habitats, cultural heritage sites, and agricultural lands. Pitt Water was named by Lieutenant Governor Collins, who named the shallow stretch of water between Sorell and Midway Point after the then Chancellor of the Exchequer, William Pitt.

== Geography ==
Pitt Water is a shallow 43.1-square-kilometre (16.6 sq mi) estuarine system fed by the Coal River and connected to the Tasman Sea via Barilla Bay and the Frederick Henry Bay. The area is characterised by tidal flats, saltmarshes, and surrounding low-lying agricultural land. It is located approximately 25 kilometres (16 mi) east of Hobart, the state capital of Tasmania.

The region forms part of the greater Pitt Water–Orielton Lagoon system, which is an important ecological feature of southern Tasmania. The estuary's main central basin connects with smaller sub-basins, such as Orielton Lagoon and Iron Creek Bay, and is shaped by a combination of tidal flows and sediment dynamics.

== History ==
The Pitt Water area is part of the traditional lands of the Moomairremener people, an Aboriginal group of the Paredarerme. The region was used for hunting, gathering, and cultural practices, particularly along its rich estuarine margins.

In 1803, Pitt Water became one of the earliest areas of European settlement in Tasmania when Lieutenant John Bowen established a short-lived settlement at nearby Risdon Cove. By the mid-19th century, the area had developed into a hub for farming and fishing, with its fertile soils supporting agricultural activities, particularly cropping and grazing.

== Environment ==
Pitt Water is part of the Pitt Water–Orielton Lagoon Ramsar site, designated as a Ramsar Wetland of International Importance in 1982. The site supports a diverse range of flora and fauna, including many migratory bird species protected under international agreements such as the JAMBA and CAMBA.

Key species that inhabit the area include:

- Endangered Birds The swift parrot and the forty-spotted pardalote use the surrounding woodlands.
- Migratory Waterbirds Species such as the eastern curlew and red-necked stint are frequently observed.
- Marine Life The estuarine system supports fish species such as mullet and flathead, which are important to the local ecosystem and recreational fishing.

Saltmarsh habitats around Pitt Water are also vital for carbon sequestration, nutrient cycling, and buffering against coastal erosion.

The estuary’s tidal dynamics contribute to its ecological health. Each tidal cycle moves approximately a fifth of the estuary’s total high-water volume (~101.8 gigalitres (3.60×10^{9} cu ft)), with the flushing time averaging 4.36 tidal cycles. The main channel, about 12 km long with an average depth of 8 m, facilitates water exchange and stabilises salinity, temperature, and nutrient levels.

== Recreation ==
The Pitt Water region is a popular destination for outdoor activities, including:

- Fishing The estuary provides excellent opportunities for recreational and small-scale commercial fishing.
- Birdwatching The area's wetlands and saltmarshes attract birdwatchers from across Tasmania and beyond.
- Water Sports Kayaking and paddleboarding are common in the sheltered waters of the estuary.

== Economy ==
Pitt Water and its surrounding areas contribute significantly to Tasmania’s agricultural sector. Key industries include:

- Viticulture Nearby vineyards benefit from the Coal River Valley’s climate and soils.
- Crop Production Fertile soils support the cultivation of vegetables, grains, and other crops.
- Tourism Visitors to the region enjoy its natural beauty, wildlife, and local produce.

== Sources ==
- Richard Mount; Vanessa Lucieer; Miles Lawler; Alan Jordan (2005). Mapping of Estuarine and Marine Habitats in the Southern NRM Region (PDF) (Report). Marine Research Laboratories - Tasmanian Aquaculture and Fisheries Institute, University of Tasmania.
- "Pitt Water Nature Reserve Management Plan" (PDF). Parks and Wildlife Service Department of Primary Industries, Parks, Water and Environment.
- "Pitt Water – Orielton Lagoon Tasmania Ecological Character Description" (PDF). Department of Climate Change, Energy, the Environment and Water, Australian Government.
