= McGees Bridge =

Road bridge in Tasmania, Australia

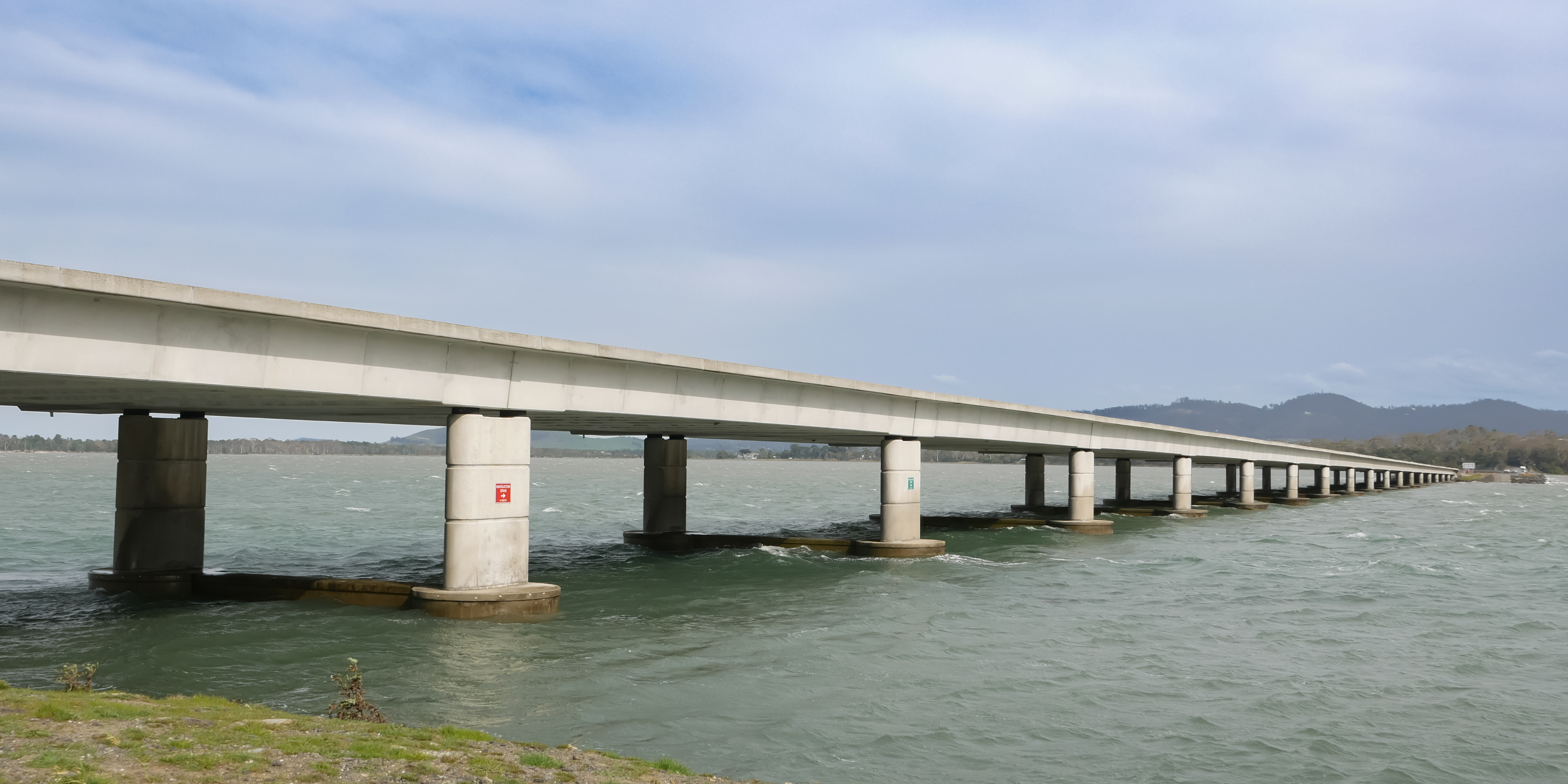
- Coordinates: 42°48′23″S 147°31′33″E
- Carries: Tasman Highway
- Crosses: Pitt Water
- Locale: Hobart, Tasmania, Australia
- Maintained by: Building Tasmania

Characteristics
- Design: Post-tensioned trough-girder bridge
- Total length: 460 metres (1,509 ft) (bridge only)
- Width: 15 metres (49 ft)

History
- Designer: GHD
- Constructed by: John Holland
- Opened: December 2002

Location
- Interactive map of McGees Bridge

McGees Bridge is a road bridge that carries the Tasman Highway across Pitt Water, near Sorell in the south-east of Tasmania, Australia. The bridge and adjacent Sorell Causeway provide vital links between Hobart and two of Tasmania's principal tourist attractions - Port Arthur on the Tasman Peninsula and the picturesque East Coast via the Tasman Highway.

== History ==
The Tasmanian Government decided in the mid 19th century that if a crossing at Pitt Water could be made, it would considerably reduce the time to reach Sorell. It was decided to build a causeway for two-thirds of the length of Pitt Water and use a bridge to complete the rest of the crossing. A single-lane timber bridge was the first construction, but continuing maintenance on a major highway bridge became a significant problem.

As a result, Australia's first post-tensioned beam and slab bridge was completed in 1957. A feature of the bridge was that the voids for the tendons were created using inflated rubber tubes which were withdrawn after the concrete had set. The bridge was given a 50-year life span. In 2001 it became apparent that the ingress of chlorides had caused the bridge to deteriorate seriously. The State Government awarded John Holland a design/build contract to replace the ageing bridge.

The new bridge (designed by GHD) is thought to be the first match-cast precast-segmental channel-type road bridge outside France and the United States. The $20 million McGees Bridge was the largest single infrastructure project funded by the State Government for more than 15 years.

The new bridge was named as a tribute to Dr Rodney William McGee, who died after a long battle with cancer on 1 February 2002, aged 47. At the time of his death he was a senior engineer with the Department of Infrastructure, Energy & Resources and was recognised interstate and internationally for his expertise in bridge engineering.

The project was marked by extensive community involvement and particular attention to safeguarding the local environment, as the bridge is in an internationally recognised wetlands site and designated heritage area.

The Premier of Tasmania, Jim Bacon was present at the official opening ceremony which was also attended by the Minister for Infrastructure, Jim Cox, the Mayor of Sorell, Carmel Torenius, and members of Rod McGee's family.
