= Richmond Bridge (Tasmania) =

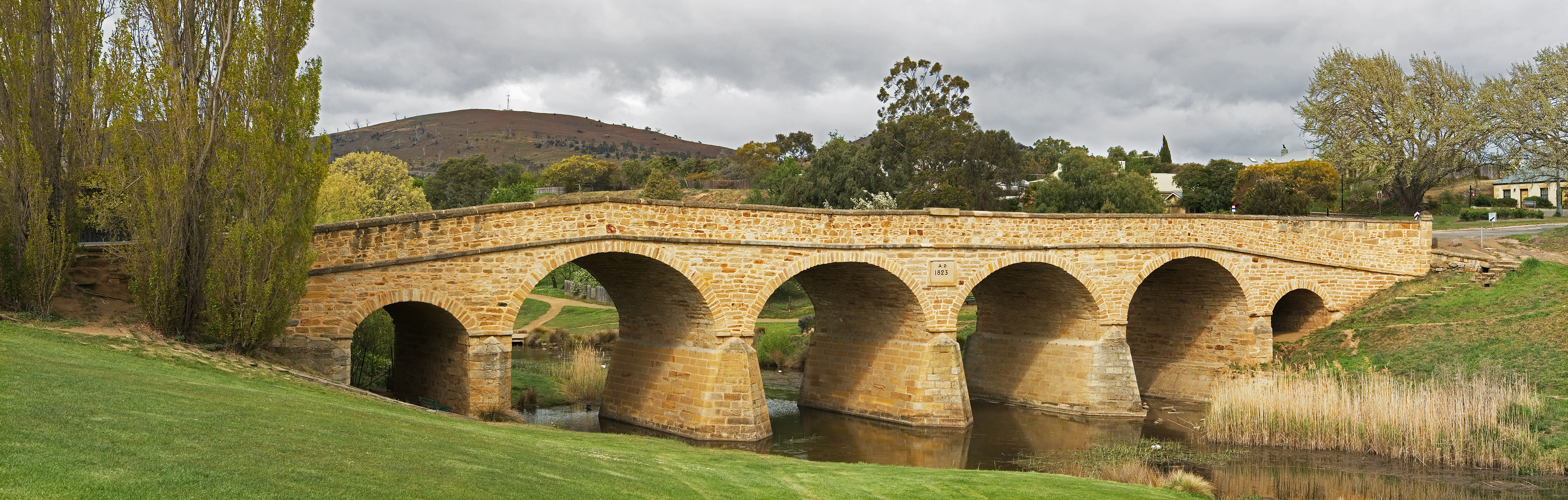
- Coordinates: 42°44′01″S 147°26′22″E
- Carries: Motor vehicles, pedestrians and bicycles
- Crosses: Coal River
- Locale: Richmond, Tasmania

Characteristics
- Total length: 41m (135ft)
- Width: 7.2m (25ft)
- Longest span: Department of Infrastructure, Energy and Resources

History
- Opened: 1825

Statistics

Tasmanian Heritage Register
- Place ID: 1,101
- Status: Permanently Registered

Location
- Interactive map of Richmond Bridge

The Richmond Bridge is a heritage-listed arch bridge located on the B31 ("Convict Trail") in Richmond, 25 kilometres (15.5 mi) north of Hobart in Tasmania, Australia. It is the oldest stone span bridge in Australia. In 2005, the bridge was recognised as an outstanding historic place and added to the Australian National Heritage List.

== History ==
The foundation stone for the Richmond Bridge was laid on 11 December 1823, and construction continued using convict labour until completion in 1825. The bridge was originally named Bigge's Bridge after Royal Commissioner John Thomas Bigge, who recognised the need for the bridge in 1820.

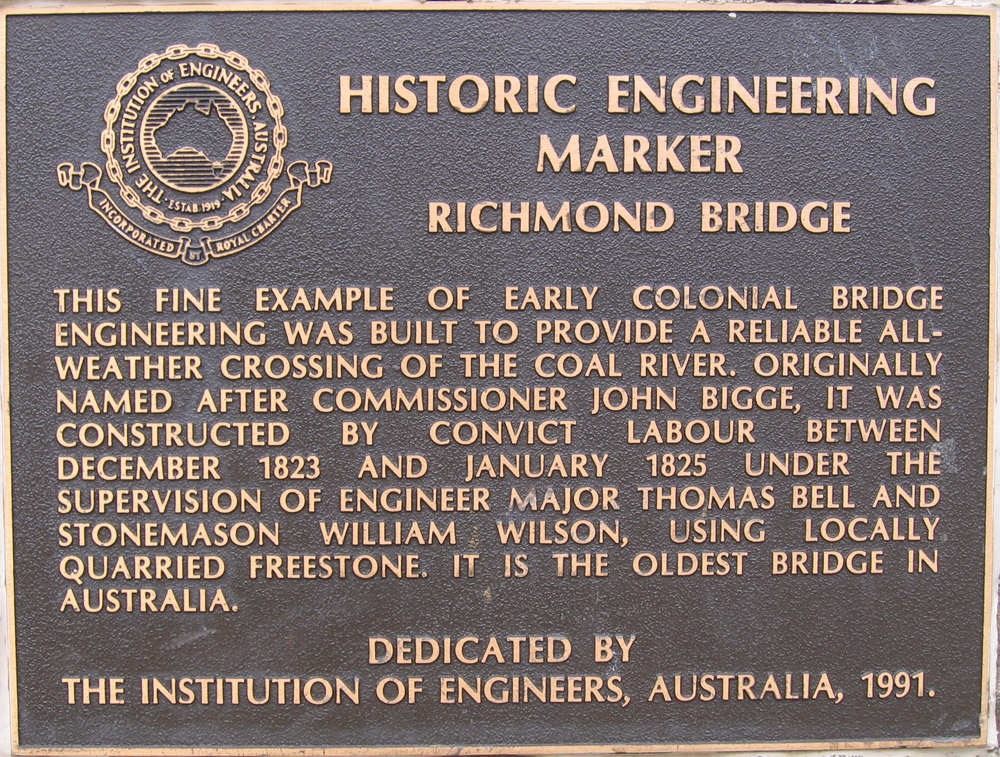
The plaque on Richmond Bridge summarising its history

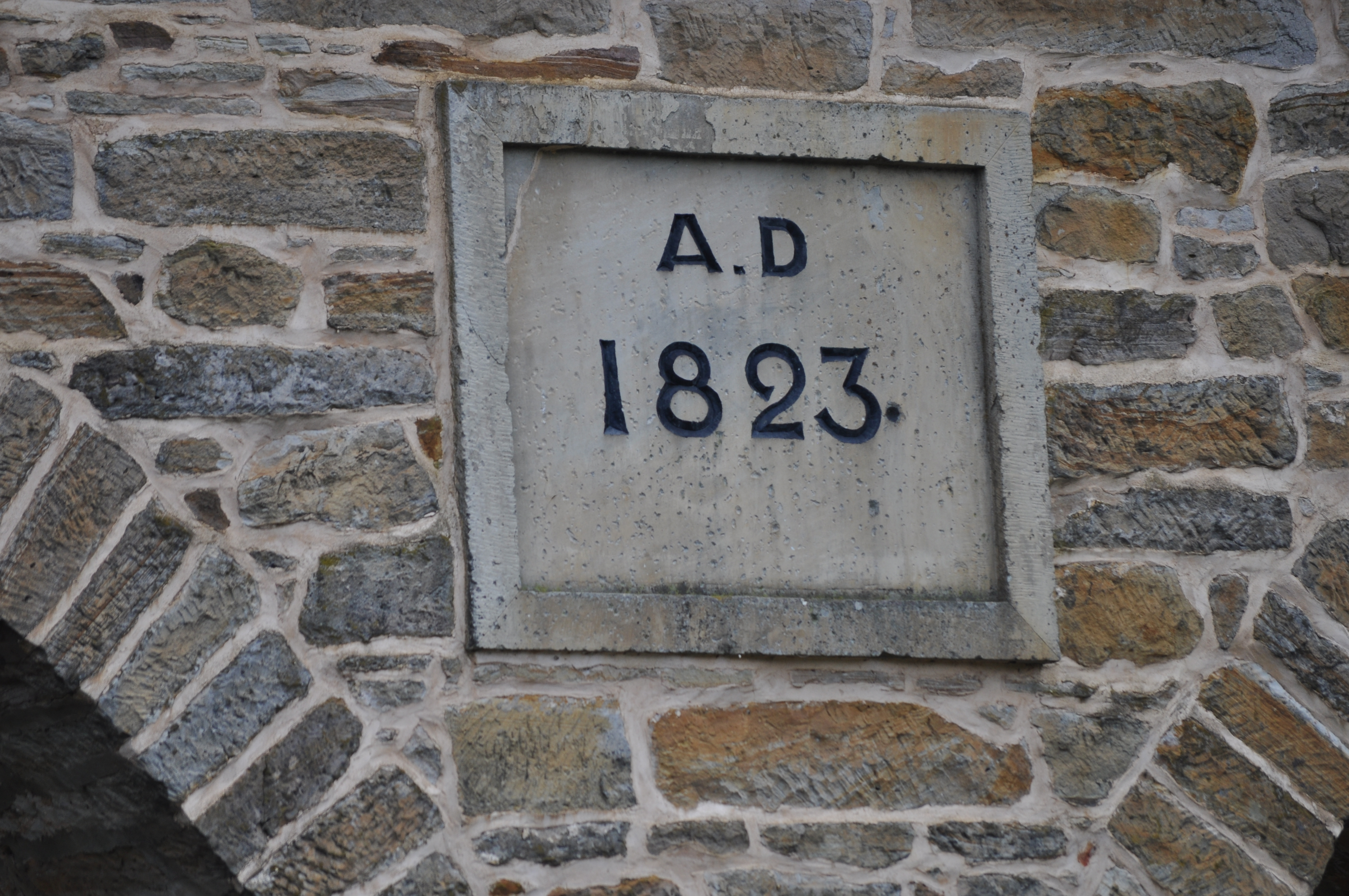
The stone set in the bridge showing construction started in 1823.

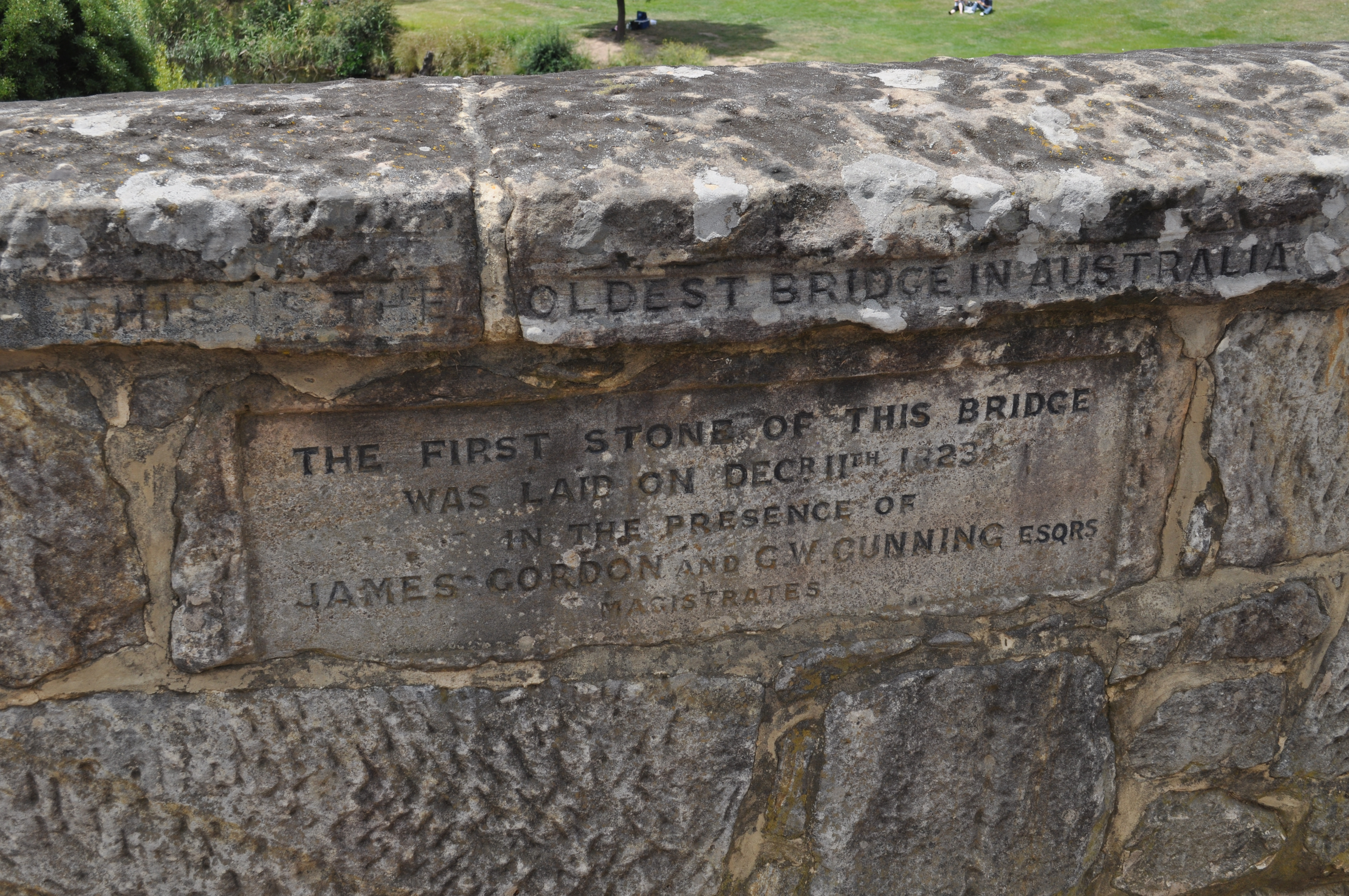
Another historic marker set into the bridge

=== Murder of George Grover ===
In 1832, an employee of the Richmond Gaol was murdered at Richmond Bridge. George Grover was employed as a gaoler whose duties included flogging the prisoners. He was unpopular due to his ferocity, and he was pushed off the edge of Richmond Bridge after drunkenly falling asleep. No one was convicted of his murder.

== Construction ==
The Richmond Bridge is constructed of sandstone quarried from Butchers Hill, hauled to the construction site by convicts using hand carts. It consists of four main arches, of span 4.3, 8.1, 8.3, 8.5, 8.3 and 4.1 metres (14.1, 26.6, 27.2, 27.9, 27.2, and 13.5 ft), respectively, which spring from sloping fins with angular leading edges aligned with the flow of to the lake.

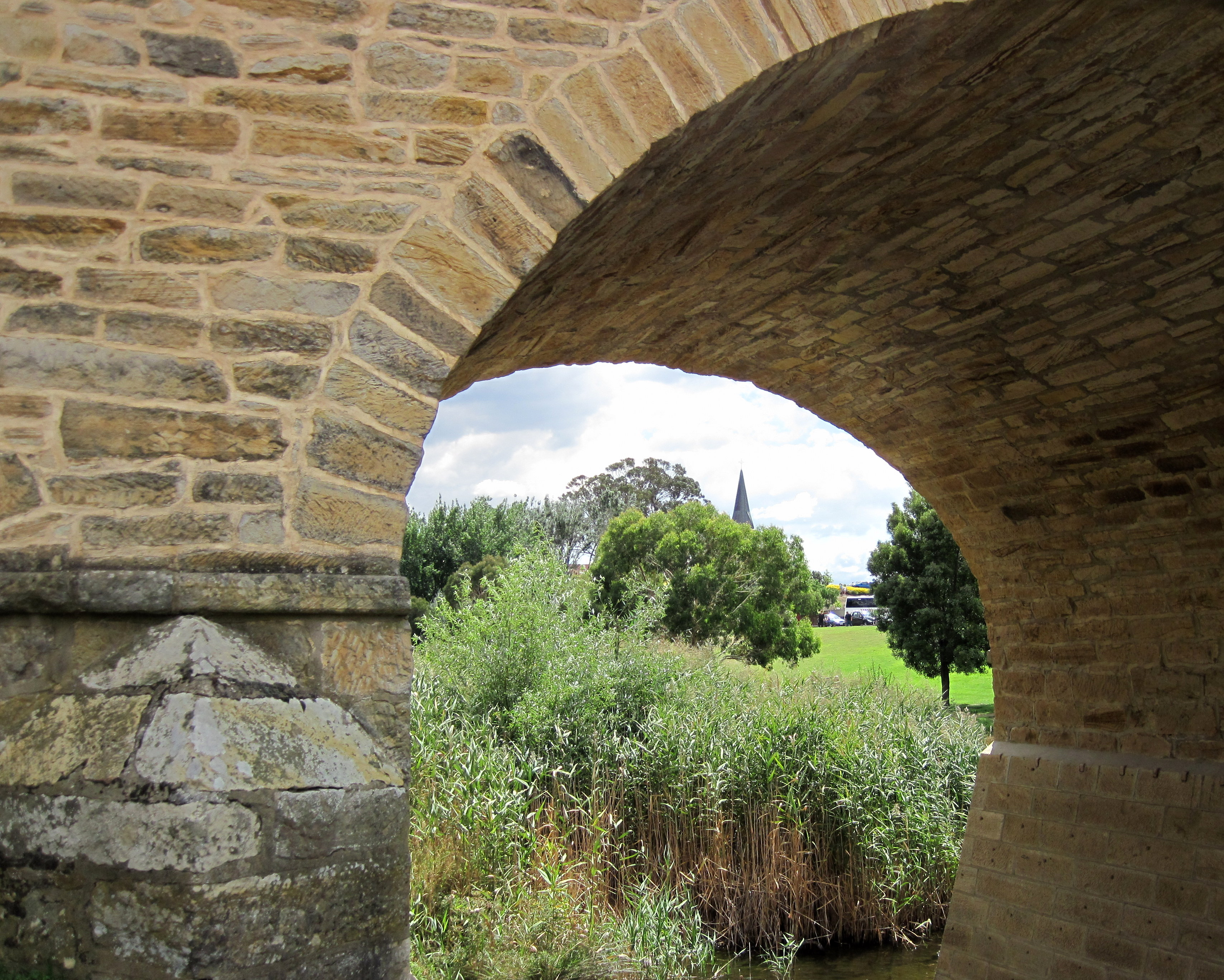
A view through an arch of the bridge

Further Research of the Bridge's History: its construction and environ flora

The plaque gives official recognition to those directly involved in the construction of the bridge. From 2004 to 2005, descendants of William Wilson (full name William Hartley Wilson), named on the plaque as Superintendent of Stonemasons for the construction, undertook extensive research into aspects of the bridge's building and subsequent modifications, as well as the natural fauna/flora which existed in the vicinity of the bridge at that time.

A copy of the image and the PDF research file may be seen on this web page. The Bonnie William website was created by a member of the descendant family of early Van Diemen's Land residents William Hartley Wilson and Margaret Wilson, and the ensuing quote below taken from it was written by the website owner/administrator.

The purpose of the research was twofold: a) to understand the construction and appearance of the bridge at the time of its completion in 1825, and the significant modifications that it underwent over the 60 or so years after that; and b) to establish a valid basis to guide a professional landscape artist in undertaking on commission an oil painting of the Bridge as it originally appeared in 1825. This project was completed in May 2007.

The story of the research project, its discoveries and its outcomes is set out in PDF file format and may be accessed as referenced. The painting of the bridge as it was on its completion in 1825 was created by internationally noted Hobart artist Mrs Joan Humble (Joan Humble OAM). The original painting is owned by the initiator of the research project.

The essential purpose of the research project was to discover what post-construction changes had been made to the bridge, and to then depict its original construction appearance in a quality image which would not otherwise exist, and, additionally, to set that depiction in the original 1825 environment; thus, the research encompassed identifying the original flora in terms of grasses, reeds, shrubs and trees, and including those in the depiction (in place of the European flora which dominates the area today. The depiction also adopted a southern aspect which features the quarry on Butchers Hill from which the sandstone masonry used in the bridge and much of the emerging village came.

The 1825 depiction shows the Bridge did not at its completion have the 1823 stone plaques attached above its central pier; the three middle piers were originally traditional vertical cutwaters identical to the two piers as still seen today at water's edge, and did not have the quite bulky elongated hexagonal plan cutwaters (added in 1884/5); and the townside bridge approach followed the same gentle downward slope design as still exists at the eastern end and as seen in the lower road level string course. This modification was made in 1834/5 and was undertaken for bridge approach safety reasons. The bronze plaque is a recent addition on the roadside inner wall, added in 1991.

Whilst beauty will always be as perceived in the eye of the viewer, many people interested in Tasmanian edifices of historical note consider the circa 1825 depiction maintain that the original construction had finer and more balanced features.

Official records held in the Mitchell Library confirmed what records held by Wilson's descendants had indicated: William Hartley Wilson held not only the role of Superintendent of Stonemasons but also the role of Colonial Architect for Van Diemen's Land. Wilson was not a qualified architect; rather, he had been appointed to that role by Lieutenant Governor Sorell in the absence of a more qualified candidate. Wilson was therefore the first Colonial Architect of Van Diemen's Land whilst it was still a part of the Colony of NSW; David Lambe, who succeeded Wilson, was the first Colonial Architect of Van Diemen's Land as a sovereign Colony under the Crown (1825).

== Engineering heritage award ==
The bridge received a Historic Engineering Marker from Engineers Australia as part of its Engineering Heritage Recognition Program.

== See also ==
- Government of Australia
- Department of the Environment, Water, Heritage and the Arts
