= Orielton Lagoon =

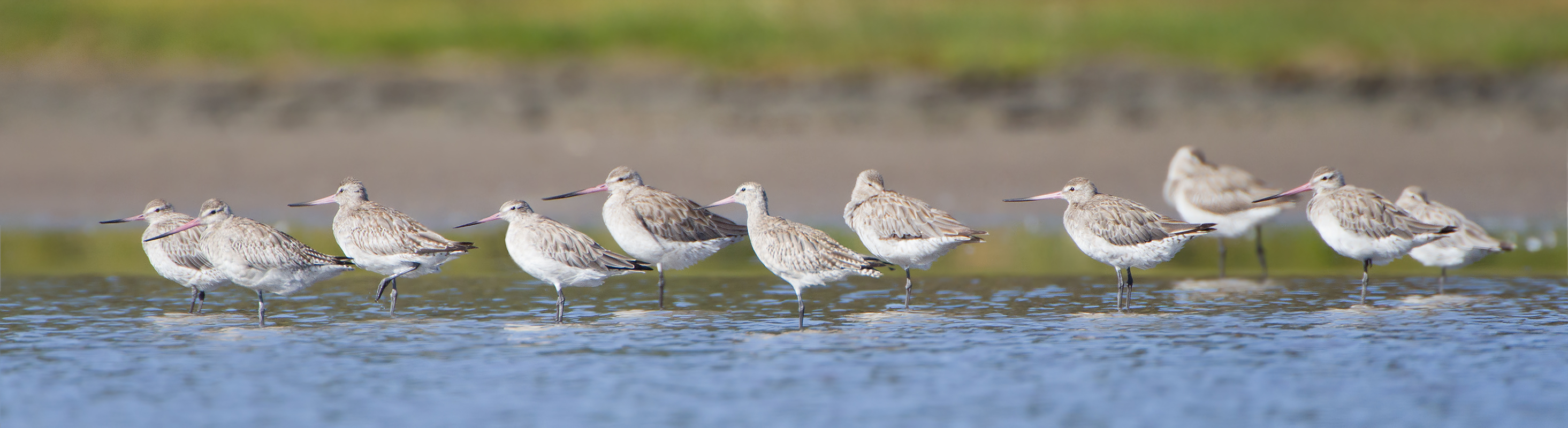
- Part of a flock of bar-tailed godwit at Orielton Lagoon

- Location in Tasmania
- Location: South east Tasmania, Australia
- Coordinates: 42°47′24″S 147°31′48″E
- Type: Dystrophic lagoon
- Basin countries: Australia
- Designation: Ramsar site; Pitt Water Nature Reserve
- Surface area: 265 hectares (650 acres)
- Average depth: 1.3 metres (4 ft 3 in)

Ramsar Wetland
- Official name: Pittwater-Orielton Lagoon
- Designated: 16 November 1982
- Reference no.: 254

The Orielton Lagoon is a shallow dystrophic lagoon located west of Sorell in south east Tasmania, Australia.

== Description ==
The lagoon is 265 hectares (650 acres; 1.02 mi^{2}) in area and averages 1.3 metres (4 ft 3 in) in depth, separated from Pitt Water by the Sorell Causeway. It is a Ramsar Wetland, providing habitat for migratory shorebirds and regionally significant flora and fauna. The lagoon is part of the South Arm Important Bird Area (IBA), identified as such by BirdLife International because of its importance for the conservation of pied oystercatchers and of the migratory waders, or shorebirds, of the East Asian – Australasian Flyway.

== See also ==
- List of Ramsar sites in Australia
- List of reservoirs and dams in Australia § Tasmania
- List of lakes of Australia § Tasmania
