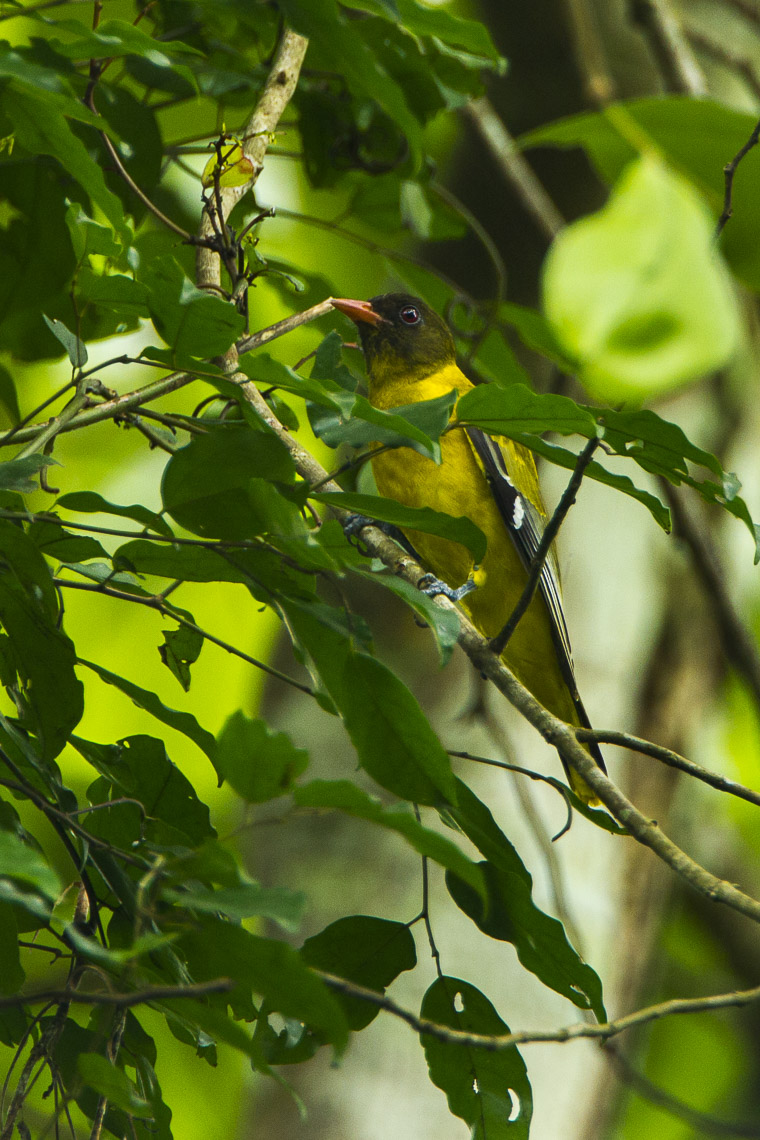

Conservation status
- Least Concern (IUCN 3.1)

Scientific classification
- Kingdom: Animalia
- Phylum: Chordata
- Class: Aves
- Order: Passeriformes
- Family: Oriolidae
- Genus: Oriolus
- Species: O. brachyrynchus

Binomial name
- Oriolus brachyrynchus Swainson, 1837

Synonyms
- Oriolus brachyrhynchus

= Western oriole =

Species of bird

The western oriole (Oriolus brachyrynchus), or western black-headed oriole, is a species of bird in the family Oriolidae that is native to Africa. The adult upperparts are yellow-olive, and the underparts are yellow in colour. It is rated as a species of least concern on the International Union for Conservation of Nature Red List of Endangered Species.

== Taxonomy and systematics ==
The western oriole was first described in 1837 by the English ornithologist William Swainson. Alternate names for the western oriole include the black-headed oriole (not to be confused with another species of the same name, Oriolus larvatus) and greenish-backed oriole. Two subspecies are recognized:

- West African black-headed oriole (O. b. brachyrynchus) – Swainson, 1837: Found from Guinea-Bissau to Togo and Benin
- Cameroon black-headed oriole (O. b. laetior) – Sharpe, 1897: Found from Nigeria to western Kenya, south-central Democratic Republic of Congo and northern Angola

According to the genetic data, the western oriole and the green-headed oriole (Oriolus chlorocephalus) are sister species.

== Description ==
The western oriole measures 21 centimetres (8.3 in) in length, and weighs 42 to 57 g (1.5 to 2.0 oz). The adult upperparts are yellow-olive in colour; the head to upper breast is black, and the periphery of the wings has a small white patch. It has a brownish pink beak. The underparts are yellow. The tail feathers are black and have broad yellow tips.

The juvenile has olive upperparts. The head is olive, and the throat is streaked with yellow. It has a dusky beak, and black streaked breast.

It has a variety of fluty vocalizations such as uoo-uoo, uoo-dleeo, tioolioo, whee-whooliu, whoolioo, and too-too-tuloo which normally have detached notes, and are lower pitched than those of the black-winged oriole (Oriolus nigripennis). It also emits a harsh whit-cheeew-cheeew.

== Distribution and habitat ==
The western oriole is native to the rainforests of Sierra Leone, Guinea, Liberia, Ivory Coast, Benin, and Ghana.

It is native to the African tropical rainforest. It lives either individually or in pairs in canopies of lowland primary forests, secondary forests, forest clearings with shrubs, and forest edges.

== Status and conservation ==
Since 1988, the western oriole has been rated as a species of least concern on the IUCN Red List of Endangered Species. This is because it has a very large range and because its population is thought not to have declined by 30% over ten years or three generations. Although the population size has not been measured, it is thought to be more than the threshold required to warrant it a vulnerable rating. Habitat loss is one reason for its population decline.
