= Montane oriole =

Montane oriole may refer to:

- Green-headed oriole, a species of bird found in eastern Africa
- Mountain oriole, a species of bird found in central and eastern Africa
