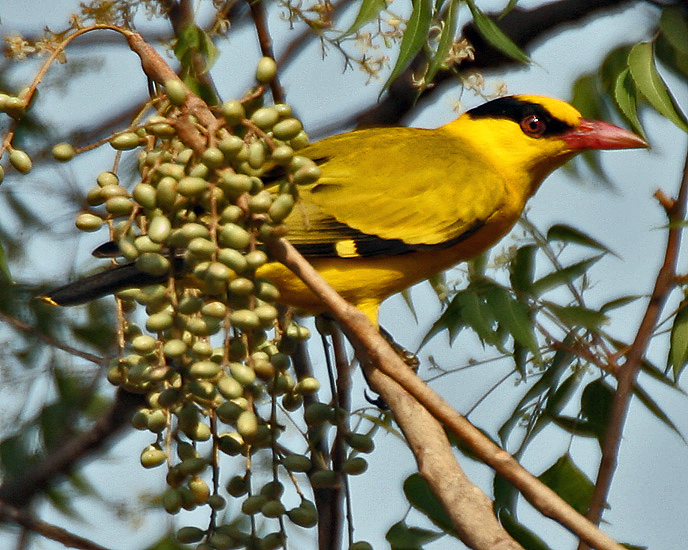
- Adult female O. c. diffusus (Hyderabad, India)

Conservation status
- Least Concern (IUCN 3.1)

Scientific classification
- Kingdom: Animalia
- Phylum: Chordata
- Class: Aves
- Order: Passeriformes
- Family: Oriolidae
- Genus: Oriolus
- Species: O. chinensis

Binomial name
- Oriolus chinensis Linnaeus, 1766

= Black-naped oriole =

Species of bird

The black-naped oriole (Oriolus chinensis) is a passerine bird in the oriole family that is found in many parts of Asia. There are several distinctive populations within the wide distribution range of this species and in the past the slender-billed oriole (Oriolus tenuirostris) was included as a subspecies. Unlike the Indian golden oriole which only has a short and narrow eye-stripe, the black-naped oriole has the stripe broadening and joining at the back of the neck. Males and females are very similar although the wing lining of the female is more greenish. The bill is pink and is stouter than in the golden oriole.

== Taxonomy and systematics ==
In 1760 the French zoologist Mathurin Jacques Brisson included a description of the black-naped oriole in his Ornithologie based on a specimen that he mistakenly believed had been collected in the former French colony of Cochinchina in what is now southern Vietnam. He used the French name Le loriot de la Cochinchine and the Latin Oriolus Cochinsinensis. Although Brisson coined Latin names, these do not conform to the binomial system and are not recognised by the International Commission on Zoological Nomenclature. When in 1766 the Swedish naturalist Carl Linnaeus updated his Systema Naturae for the twelfth edition, he added 240 species that had been previously described by Brisson. One of these was the black-naped oriole. Linnaeus included a brief description, coined the current binomial name Oriolus chinensis ("Chinese oriole") and cited Brisson's work. The type location was subsequently corrected to Manila in the Philippines.

The evolutionary history of this group of orioles is complex and there may be more cryptic species within the group. The subspecies are very closely related and the group forms a clade in which the Eurasian oriole and Indian golden oriole are also nested.

=== Subspecies ===
Twenty subspecies are recognized:

- O. c. diffusus - Sharpe, 1877: Originally described as a separate species. Found in the eastern Palearctic
- O. c. andamanensis - Beavan, 1867: Originally described as a separate species. Found on the Andaman Islands
- O. c. macrourus - Blyth, 1846: Originally described as a separate species. Found on the Nicobar Islands
- O. c. maculatus - Vieillot, 1817: Originally described as a separate species. Found on the Malay Peninsula, Sumatra, Belitung, Bangka Island, Nias, Java, Bali and Borneo
- O. c. mundus - Richmond, 1903: Originally described as a separate species. Found on Simeulue and Nias Is.
- O. c. sipora - Chasen & Kloss, 1926: Found on Sipora (off western Sumatra)
- O. c. richmondi - Oberholser, 1912: Found on Siberut and Pagi Island (off western Sumatra)
- O. c. lamprochryseus - Oberholser, 1917: Found on Masalembu and Keramian Islands (Java Sea)
- O. c. insularis - Vorderman, 1893: Originally described as a separate species. Found on Sapudi, Raas and Kangean Islands (northeast of Java)
- O. c. melanisticus - Meyer, AB & Wiglesworth, 1894: Originally described as a separate species. Found on Talaud Islands (south of the Philippines)
- O. c. sangirensis - Meyer, AB & Wiglesworth, 1898: Found on the Sangihe Islands (off north-eastern Sulawesi)
- O. c. formosus - Cabanis, 1872: Originally described as a separate species. Found on Siau, Tahulandang, Ruang, Biaro and Mayu Islands (off north-eastern Sulawesi)
- O. c. celebensis - (Walden, 1872): Originally described as a separate species. Found on Sulawesi and nearby islands
- O. c. frontalis - Wallace, 1863: Originally described as a separate species. Found on Banggai and Sula Islands (east of Sulawesi)
- O. c. stresemanni - Neumann, 1939: Found on Peleng (off eastern Sulawesi)
- O. c. boneratensis - Meyer, AB & Wiglesworth, 1896: Originally described as a separate species. Found on Bonerate, Djampea and Kalao Islands (Selayar Islands)
- O. c. broderipi - Bonaparte, 1850: Originally described as a separate species. Found on Lombok, Sumba, Sumbawa, Flores, and Alor Island (Lesser Sunda Islands)
- O. c. chinensis - Linnaeus, 1766: Found on Palawan, Luzon, Mindoro and satellite islands (western and northern Philippines)
- O. c. yamamurae - Kuroda Sr, 1927: Found on the Visayan Islands, Mindanao and Basilan (central and southern Philippines)
- O. c. suluensis - Sharpe, 1877: Found in the Sulu Archipelago (south-western Philippines)

Calls of O. c. diffusus in winter range

== Description ==
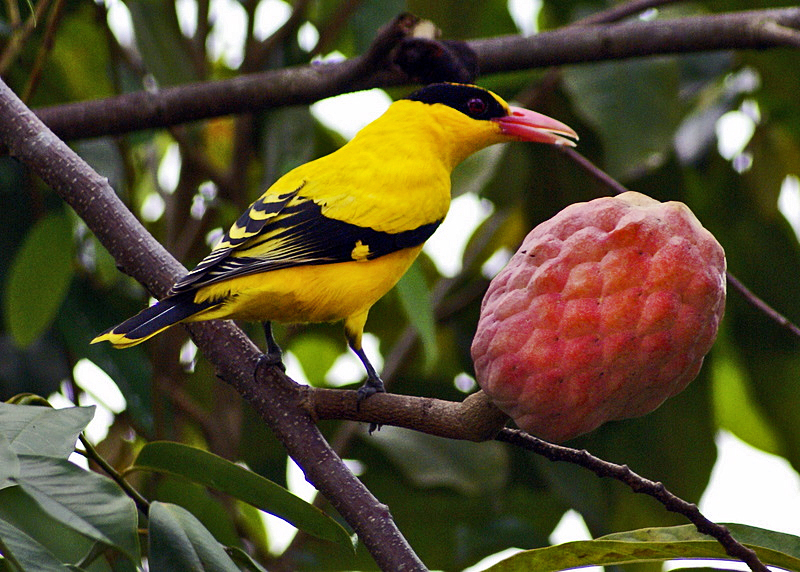
Male O. c. maculatus (Selangor, Malaysia)

O. c. maculatus (Kuala Lumpur, Malaysia)

The black-naped oriole is medium-sized and overall golden with a strong pinkish bill and a broad black mask and nape. The adult male has the central tail feathers tipped yellow and the lateral ones are more broadly yellow. The female has the mantle colour more greenish or olive. The juvenile has a streaked underside. The nestling has dull greenish with brown streaks. The head and nape are more yellowish and the undertail coverts are yellow. Several variations exist in the populations that have been separated as subspecies.

The subspecies in the Andamans, O. c. andamanensis has all black wings while O. c. macrourus of the Nicobars has a very broad nape band so that only the top of the head is yellow. The wings are all black with a yellow primary covert patch. The calls of the Andaman and the Nicobar subspecies are said to be quite different, the latter having a more modulated call note. In the Southeast Asian populations some geographic trends include a reduction of yellow on the forehead and a decreased brightness in the yellow plumage from north to south. Females from southern populations are more greenish on the back and tail and there are no yellow spots on the tips of the secondaries as in northern populations.

The usual call is a nasal niee or myaa and the song (diffusus) is a fluty iwee wee wee-leeow. They have a dipping flight.

== Distribution and habitat ==
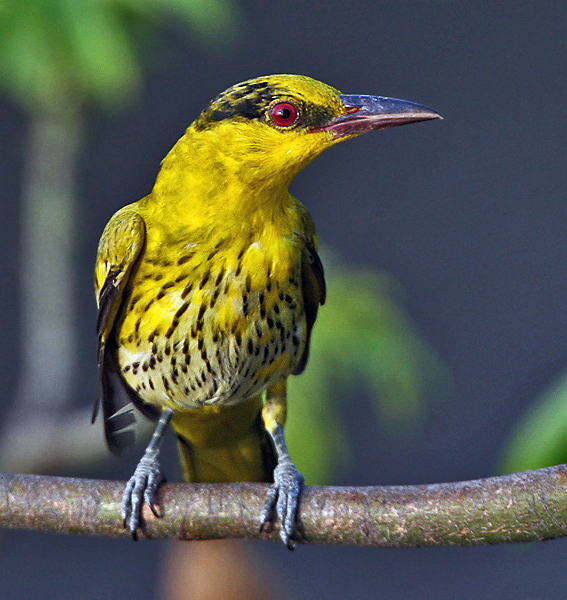
Juvenile bird in Kolkata, West Bengal, India

Subspecies diffusus breeds in eastern Siberia, Ussuriland, northeastern China, Korea, Japan and northern Vietnam and is widespread across India during winter, mainly in the northeastern parts and in the peninsular region and also found in Bangladesh. The population in the Andaman and Nicobar Islands are resident. In winter, populations breeding in eastern Asia spend the winter in the tropical areas of Southeast Asia such as Thailand and Myanmar. Subspecies diffusus is an uncommon migrant in many parts of South India and very rare migrant to Sri Lanka and are most regularly seen in the Western Ghats. In Singapore they are believed to have established as breeders only in the 1920s and are today common even within gardens in the city. In the 1880s they were considered rare. At the present time, orioles are fairly common in Singapore.

The black-naped oriole is found in forests, gardens and plantations. It feeds on berries and insects in the canopy.

== Behaviour and ecology ==
Males differ geographically in extent of black and yellow on head, wing and tail

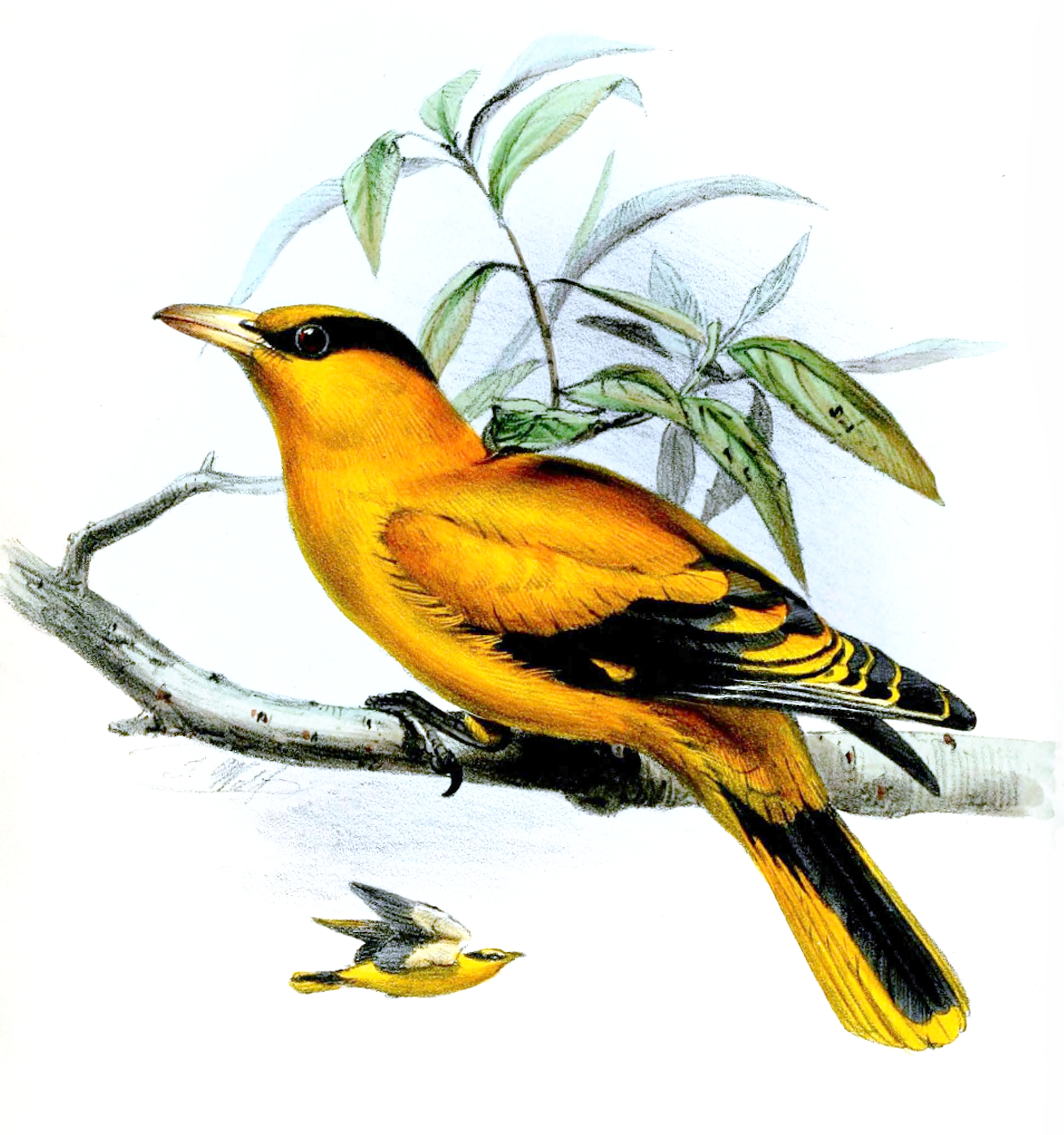
O. c. broderipii illustration (1850)

Black-naped orioles have been recorded to feed on a range of berries including Trema orientalis, Ficus and others apart from insects. It has been suggested that they may have aided in the dispersal of Ficus species into the island of Krakatoa where they were also among the early pioneer species. In India it has been noted to take nectar from large flowers such as those of Salmalia and Erythrina. They can sometimes be nest predators on smaller birds. The breeding season is April to June (January–March in the Nicobars) and the nest is a deep cup in a fork of a tree. The eggs, two to three, are salmon pink with reddish spots and darker blotches The nests are often built in the vicinity of the nest of a black drongo. Two or three nests may be built by the female and one is finally chosen for laying eggs. Males may sometimes sit beside the unused nests. Incubation is by the female alone and the eggs hatch after 14 to 16 days and the chicks fledge after another two weeks. Females stay closer to the nest, taking part in nest sanitation by removal of fecal sacs, driving away predators and feeding the young. The males take a more active role in feeding and guarding. Eurasian tree sparrows and black bulbuls may sometimes use abandoned nests. Nest predators include crows, treepies and hawks. In many parts of Southeast Asia, they are trapped and sold in the bird trade.
