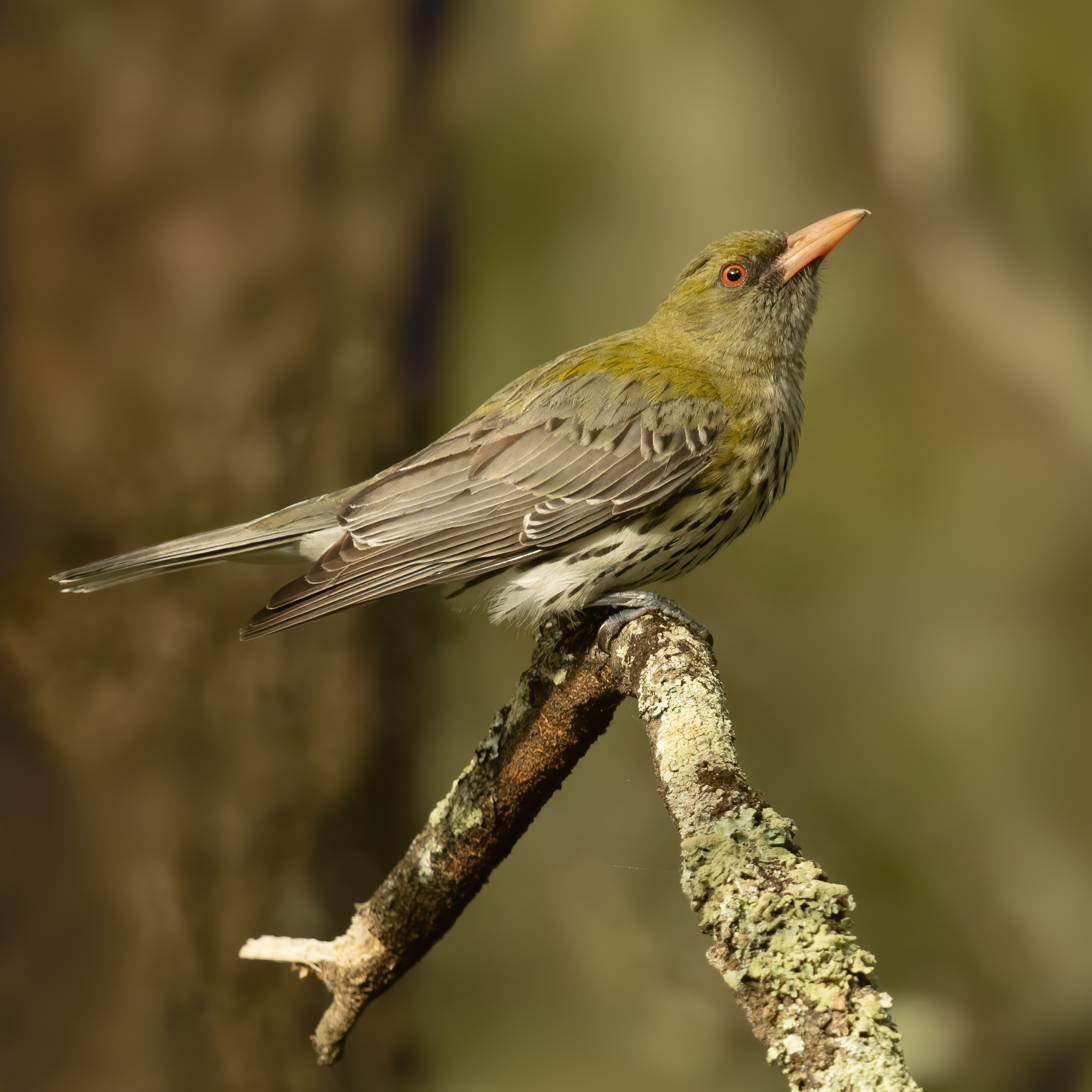
- In Canberra, Australia

Conservation status
- Least Concern (IUCN 3.1)

Scientific classification
- Kingdom: Animalia
- Phylum: Chordata
- Class: Aves
- Order: Passeriformes
- Family: Oriolidae
- Genus: Oriolus
- Species: O. sagittatus

Binomial name
- Oriolus sagittatus (Latham, 1801)

Synonyms
- Coracias sagittata; Gracula viridis

= Olive-backed oriole =

Species of bird

The olive-backed oriole (Oriolus sagittatus), or white-bellied oriole, is a very common medium-sized passerine bird native to northern and eastern Australia and south-central New Guinea. The most wide-ranging of the Australasian orioles, it is noisy and conspicuous.

== Taxonomy and systematics ==
The olive-backed oriole was originally described in the genus Coracias by the English ornithologist John Latham in 1801.

=== Subspecies ===
Four subspecies are recognized:

- O. s. magnirostris - van Oort, 1910: Trans-Fly savanna and grasslands
- O. s. affinis - Gould, 1848: Originally described as a separate species. Found in north-western and north-central Australia
- O. s. grisescens - Schodde & Mason, IJ, 1999: Found on Cape York Peninsula (north-eastern Australia) and islands of the Torres Strait
- O. s. sagittatus - (Latham, 1801): Found in eastern Australia

== Description ==
Not bright in colour, it is olive-backed with small dark streaks, with a light chest having black streaks. Females have cinnamon-edged wings and both sexes have reddish bills and eyes.

== Distribution and habitat ==
Where the green oriole specialises in damp, thickly vegetated habitats in the tropical far north, the olive-backed oriole is more versatile, preferring more open woodland environments, and tolerating drier climates (but not desert). While common to very common in the north, olive-backed orioles are less frequently seen in the south, but nevertheless reach as far as south-eastern South Australia. Their range is from the very north of Western Australia across the east and south coasts to Victoria and the corner of South Australia. Most birds breed during the tropical wet season, but some migrate south to breed in the southern summer.

Nesting, Lake Samsonvale, SE Queensland
