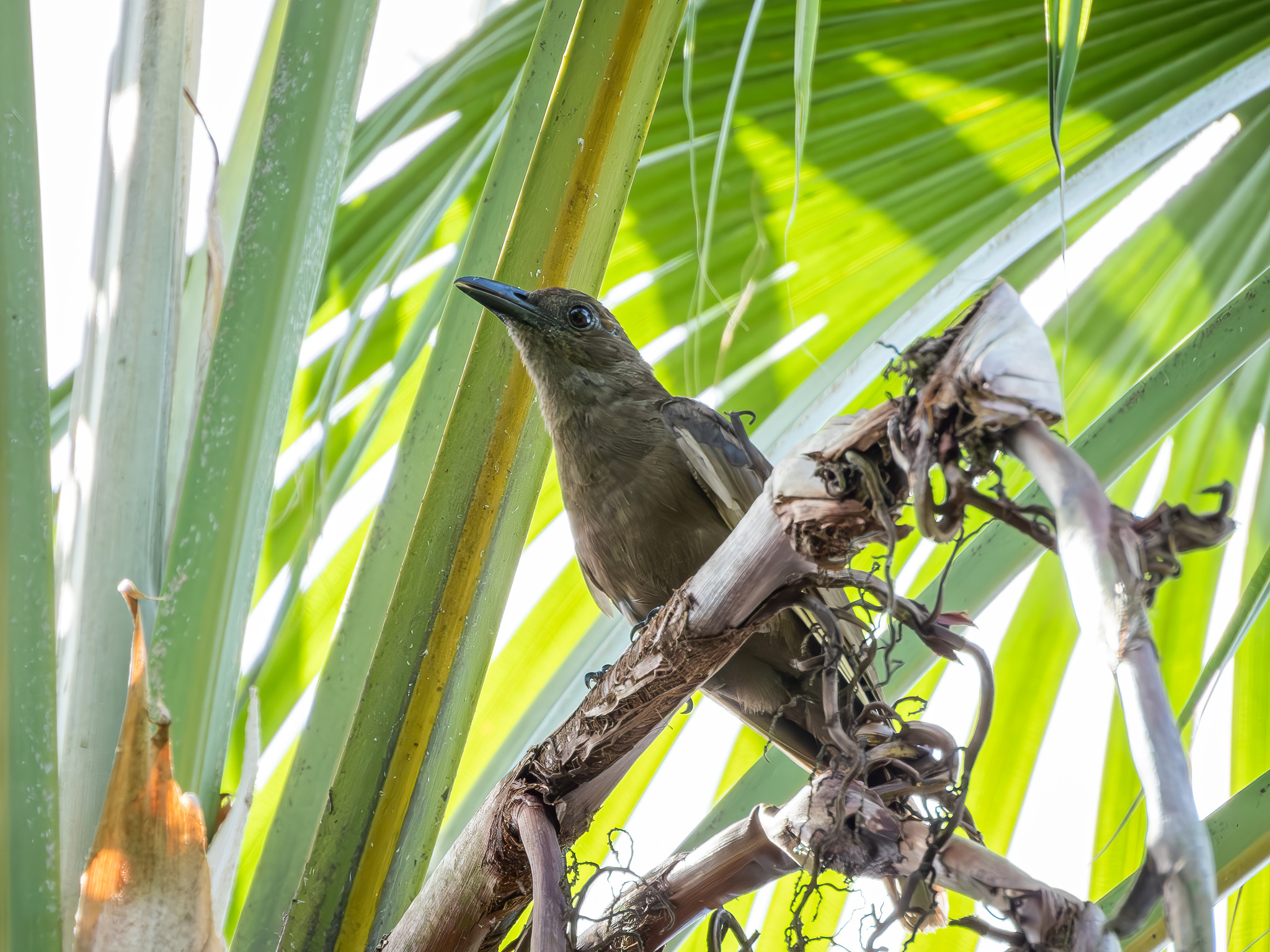

Conservation status
- Least Concern (IUCN 3.1)

Scientific classification
- Kingdom: Animalia
- Phylum: Chordata
- Class: Aves
- Order: Passeriformes
- Family: Oriolidae
- Genus: Oriolus
- Species: O. phaeochromus

Binomial name
- Oriolus phaeochromus Gray, GR, 1861

= Dusky-brown oriole =

Species of bird

The dusky-brown oriole (Oriolus phaeochromus) is a species of bird in the family Oriolidae.It is endemic to North Maluku.

Its natural habitat is subtropical or tropical moist lowland forests. Alternate names for the dusky-brown oriole include the dusky oriole, Gray's oriole, Halmahera oriole and Moluccan oriole.

== Description ==
This species typically inhabits the upper canopy of forests, forest edges, mangrove areas, and adjacent cultivated regions, primarily in lowland and foothill elevations. It is usually observed alone or in pairs, although it occasionally joins mixed-species foraging flocks.

The Dusky-brown Oriole can be distinguished from similar species, such as the White-streaked Friarbird (Philemon albitorques), by its lack of streaking or pale markings on the head and its consistently even brown coloration.

Its vocalizations include a distinctive, fluty call rendered as "ke-ke-KWEEOW", with the initial two notes often faint and the final note loud and emphatic.
