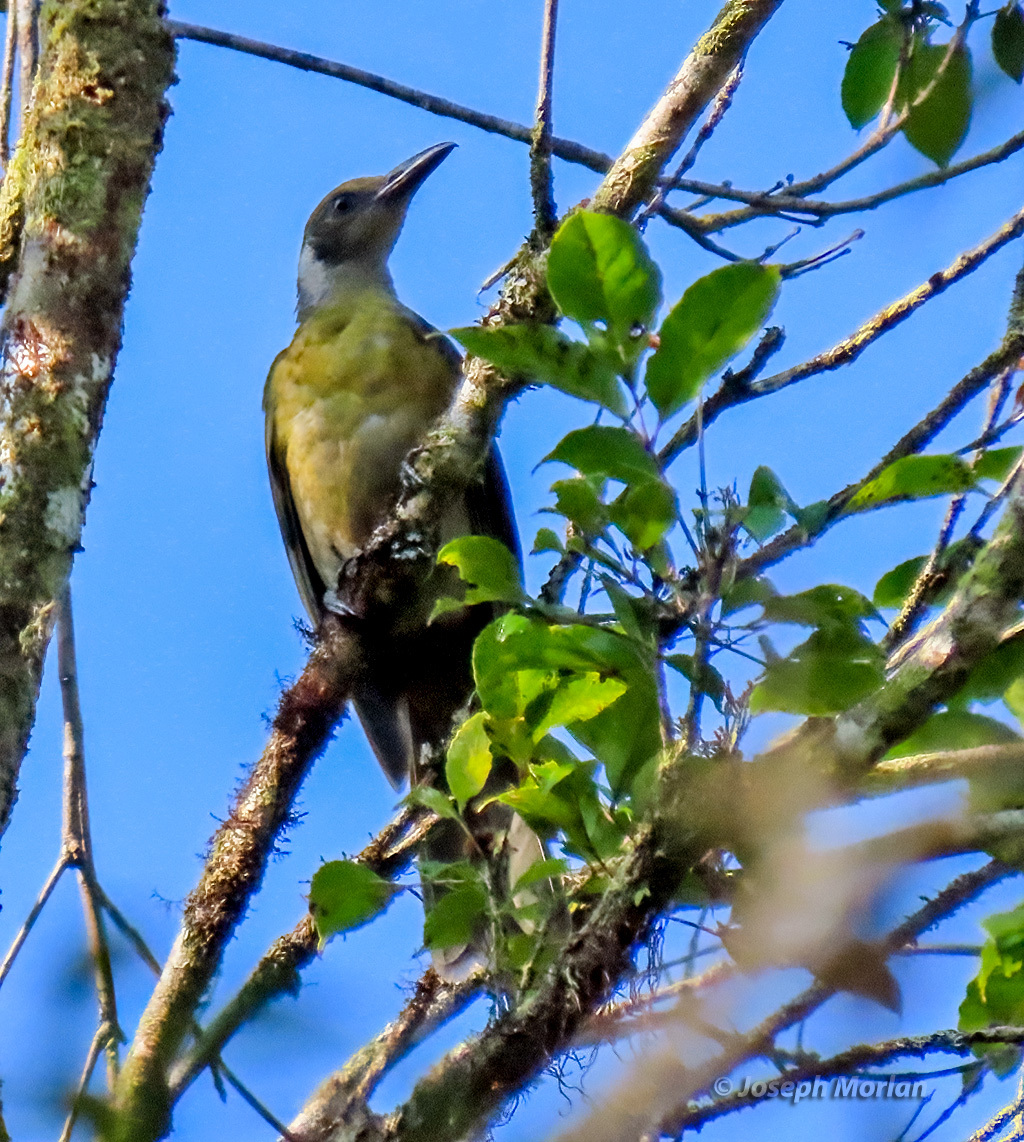

Conservation status
- Least Concern (IUCN 3.1)

Scientific classification
- Kingdom: Animalia
- Phylum: Chordata
- Class: Aves
- Order: Passeriformes
- Family: Oriolidae
- Genus: Oriolus
- Species: O. forsteni

Binomial name
- Oriolus forsteni (Bonaparte, 1850)

Synonyms
- Mimeta forsteni

= Grey-collared oriole =

Species of bird

The grey-collared oriole (Oriolus forsteni), or Seram oriole, is a species of bird in the family Oriolidae. It is endemic to Seram.

Its natural habitat is subtropical or tropical moist lowland forests.
