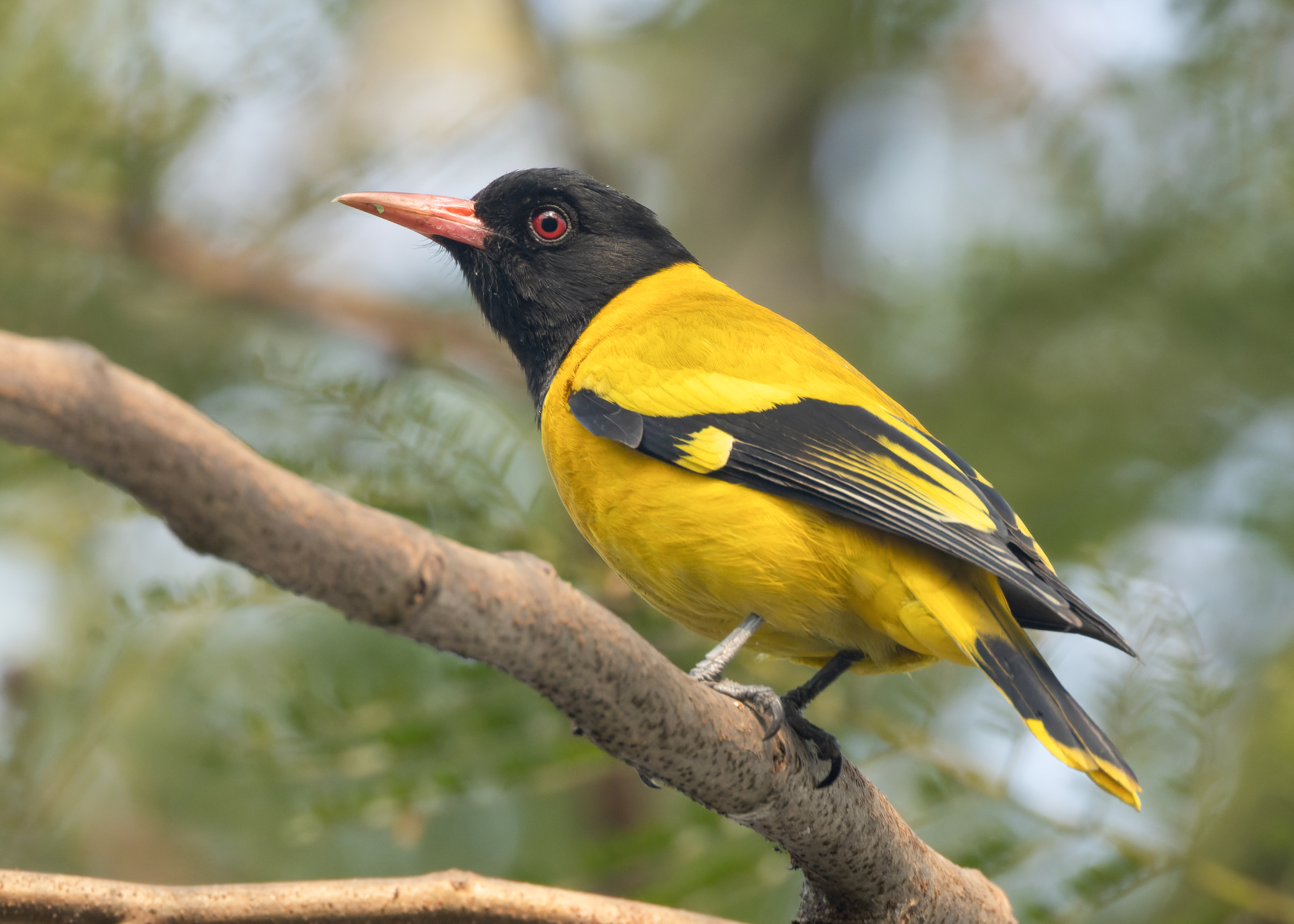
- In Rabindra Sarobar, West Bengal, India. Calls

Conservation status
- Least Concern (IUCN 3.1)

Scientific classification
- Kingdom: Animalia
- Phylum: Chordata
- Class: Aves
- Order: Passeriformes
- Family: Oriolidae
- Genus: Oriolus
- Species: O. xanthornus

Binomial name
- Oriolus xanthornus (Linnaeus, 1758)

Synonyms
- Coracias xanthornus Linnaeus, 1758; Oriolus melanocephalus Linnaeus, 1766; Sturnus luteolus Linnaeus, 1758

= Black-hooded oriole =

Species of bird

The black-hooded oriole (Oriolus xanthornus) is a member of the oriole family of passerine birds and is a resident breeder in tropical southern Asia from India and Sri Lanka east to Indonesia.

It is a bird of open woodland and cultivation. The nest is built in a tree, and contains two eggs. Its food is insects and fruit, especially figs, found in the tree canopies where they spend much of their time.

== Taxonomy and systematics ==
The black-hooded oriole was formally described by the Swedish naturalist Carl Linnaeus in 1758 in the tenth edition of his Systema Naturae under the binomial name Coracias xanthornus. Linnaeus was confused by the similar appearance of the unrelated New World orioles and the Old World orioles. In his entry for Coracias xanthornus he cited descriptions of birds occurring in Jamaica by Mark Catesby and Patrick Browne as well as an illustration by George Edwards of a bird occurring in Bengal. Linnaeus specified the habitat as "America" but Bengal is now the recognised type location. Also in the 10th edition Linnaeus listed Sturnus luteolus among the starlings and cited another illustration by Edwards. He renamed this species as Oriolus melanocephalus in the 12th edition of 1766. All three binomial names are now believed to refer to the black-hooded oriole.

The current genus Oriolus was erected by Linnaeus in 1766 in the twelfth edition of his Systema Naturae. The name is from Medieval Latin oryolus for the Eurasian golden oriole which in turn comes from the Latin word aureolus for "golden". The specific epithet xanthornus is from the Ancient Greek xanthos "yellow" and ornis "bird".

Alternate names for the black-hooded oriole include the Asian black-headed oriole, black-headed oriole, Indian black-headed oriole and Oriental black-headed oriole.

=== Subspecies ===
Five subspecies are recognized:

- O. x. xanthornus – (Linnaeus, 1758): Found from northern India to northern Malay Peninsula and Indochina
- O. x. maderaspatanus – Franklin, 1831: Originally described as a separate species. Found in central and southern India
- O. x. ceylonensis – Bonaparte, 1850: Originally described as a separate species. Found in Sri Lanka
- O. x. reubeni – Abdulali, 1977: Found on the Andaman Islands
- O. x. tanakae – Kuroda, 1925: Found on north-eastern Borneo
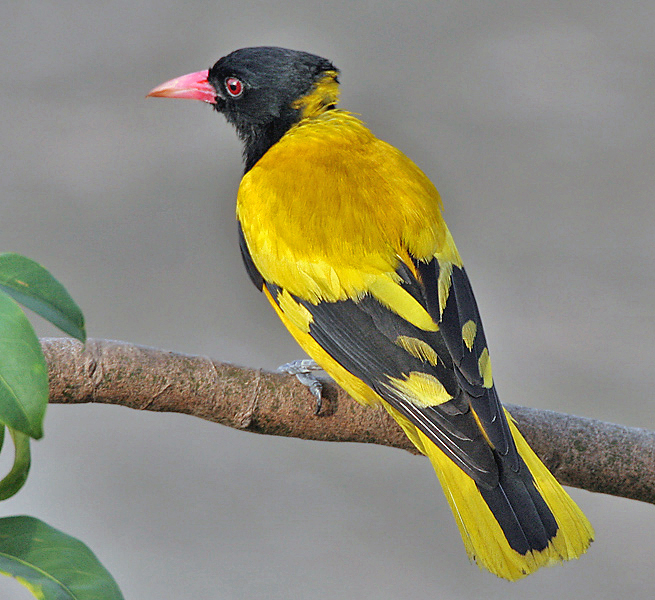
O. x. xanthornus
Kolkata

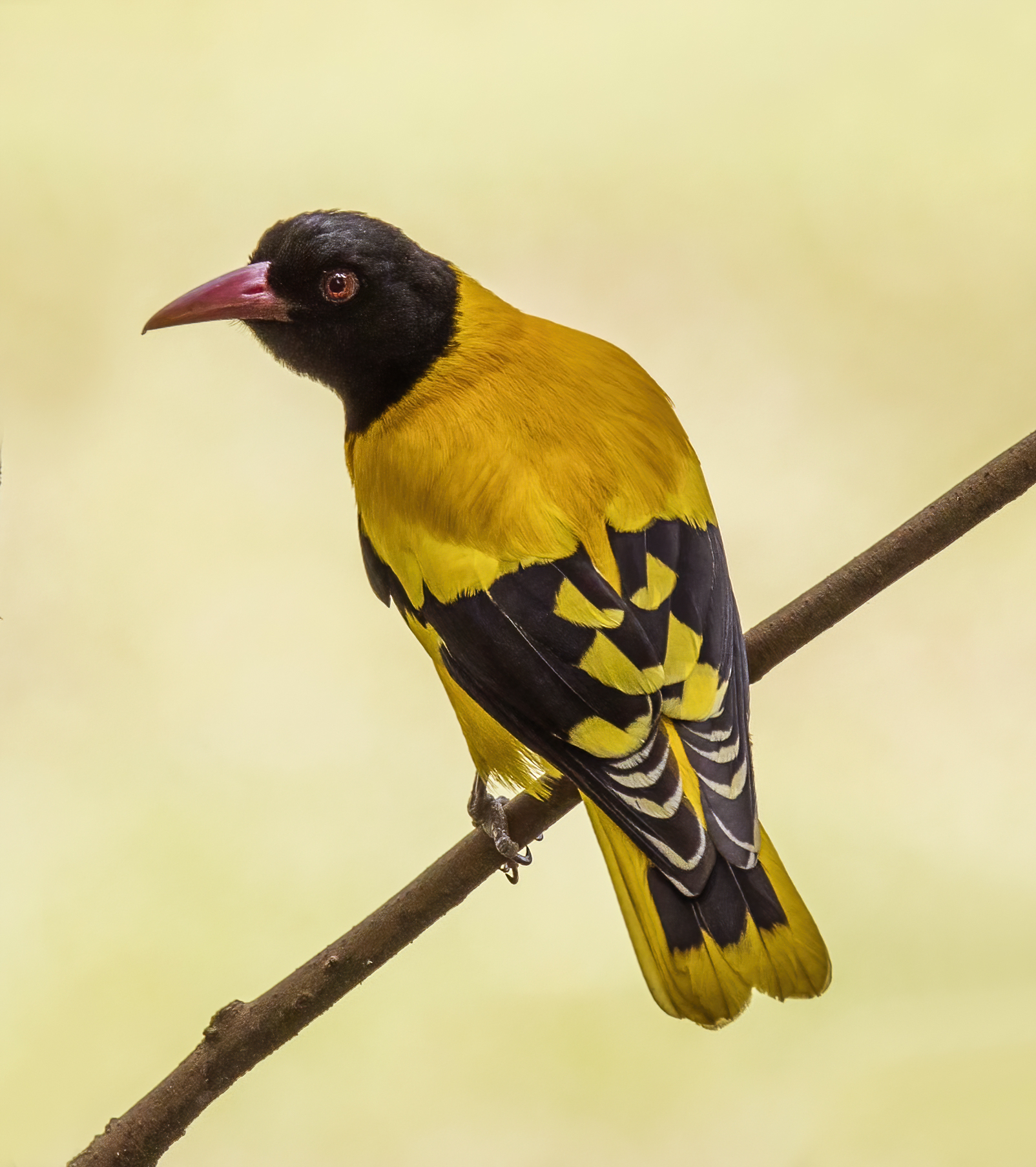
O. x. ceylonensis
Sri Lanka

== Description ==
The male is striking, with the typical oriole black and yellow colouration. The plumage is predominantly yellow, with a solid black hood, and black also in the wings and tail centre.

The female black-hooded oriole is a drabber bird with greenish underparts, but still has the black hood. Young birds are like the female, but have dark streaking on the underparts, and their hood is not solidly black, especially on the throat.

The black head of this species is an obvious distinction from the Indian golden oriole, which is a summer visitor to northern India. Orioles can be shy, and even the male may be difficult to see in the dappled yellow and green leaves of the canopy.

The black-hooded oriole's flight is somewhat like a thrush, strong and direct with some shallow dips over longer distances.

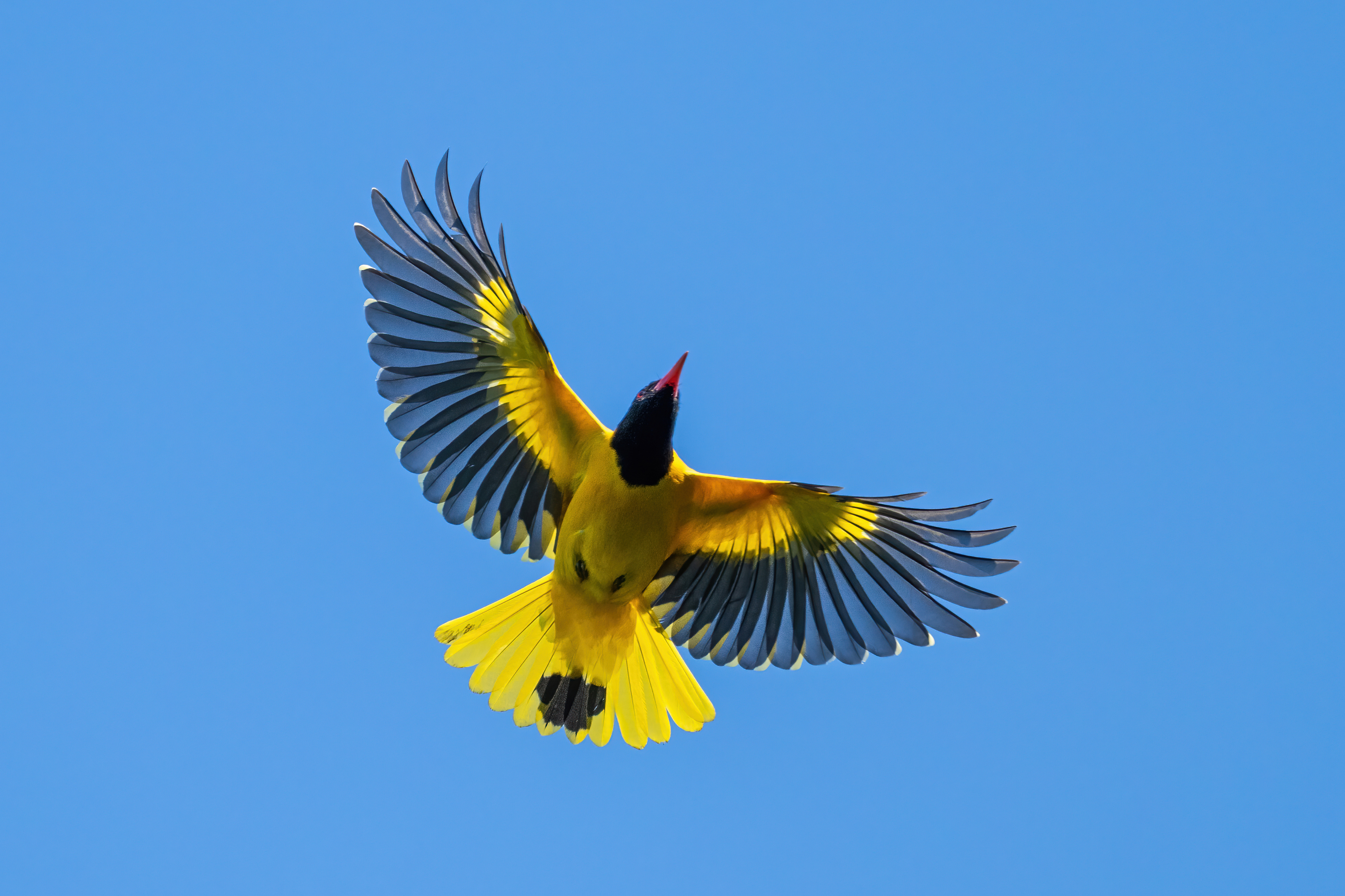
Oriolus xanthornus in flight at Nijgadh, Nepal

While foraging the species uses foliage-gleening, wood-gleening, or sallying methods.

== Relationship to humans ==
The black-hooded oriole lives in common contact with humans in rural and urban India.

A folk tale from Bengal has it that an unfortunate girl of a merchant family was abused and tortured by her mother-in-law. Troubled by various incidents she smeared herself with turmeric paste and covered herself with a sooty earthen pot and killed herself. A goddess resurrected her as a black hooded oriole and a Bengali name for the bird is "benebou" or merchant's wife while another name is "haldi pakhi" or turmeric bird.
