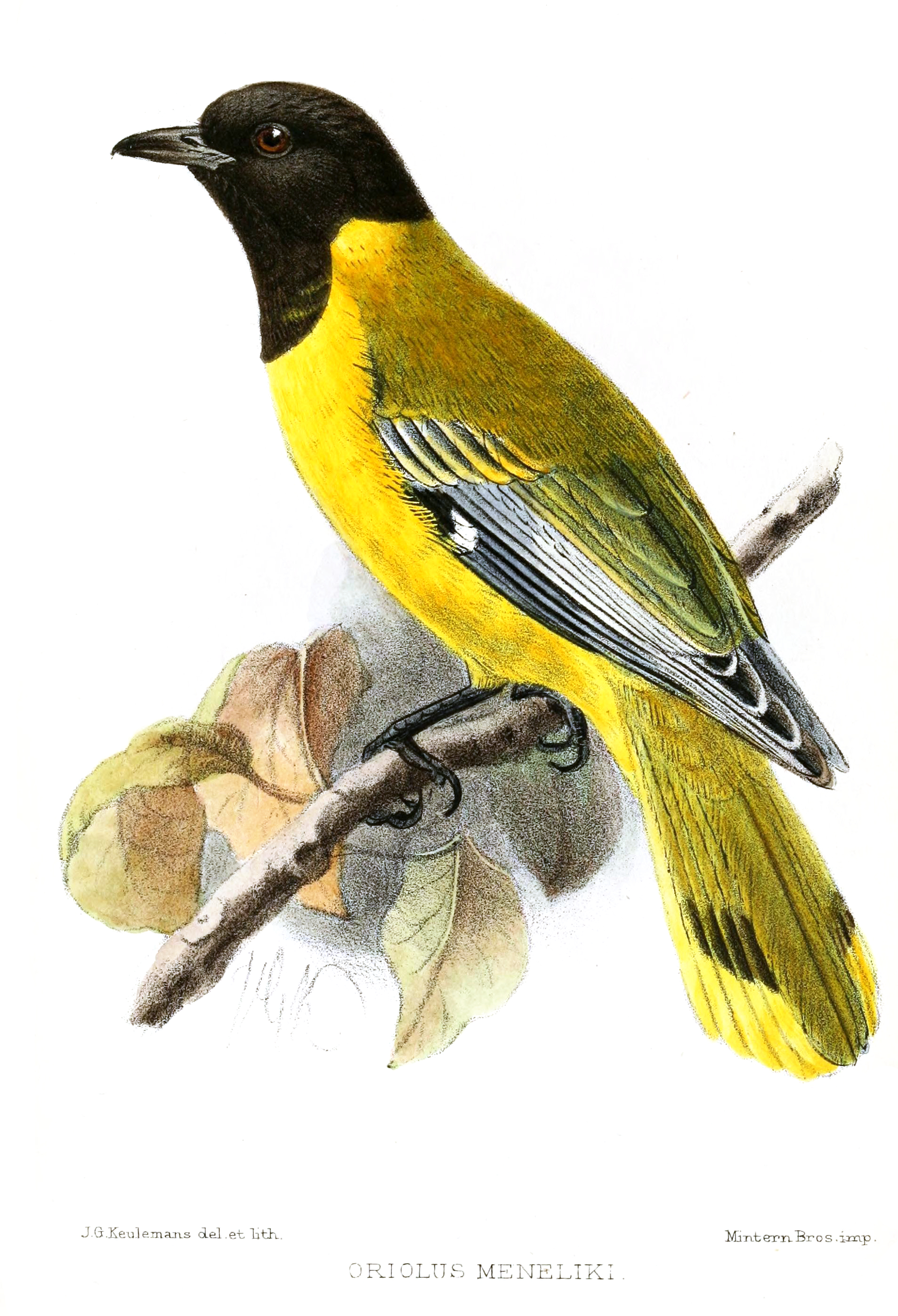

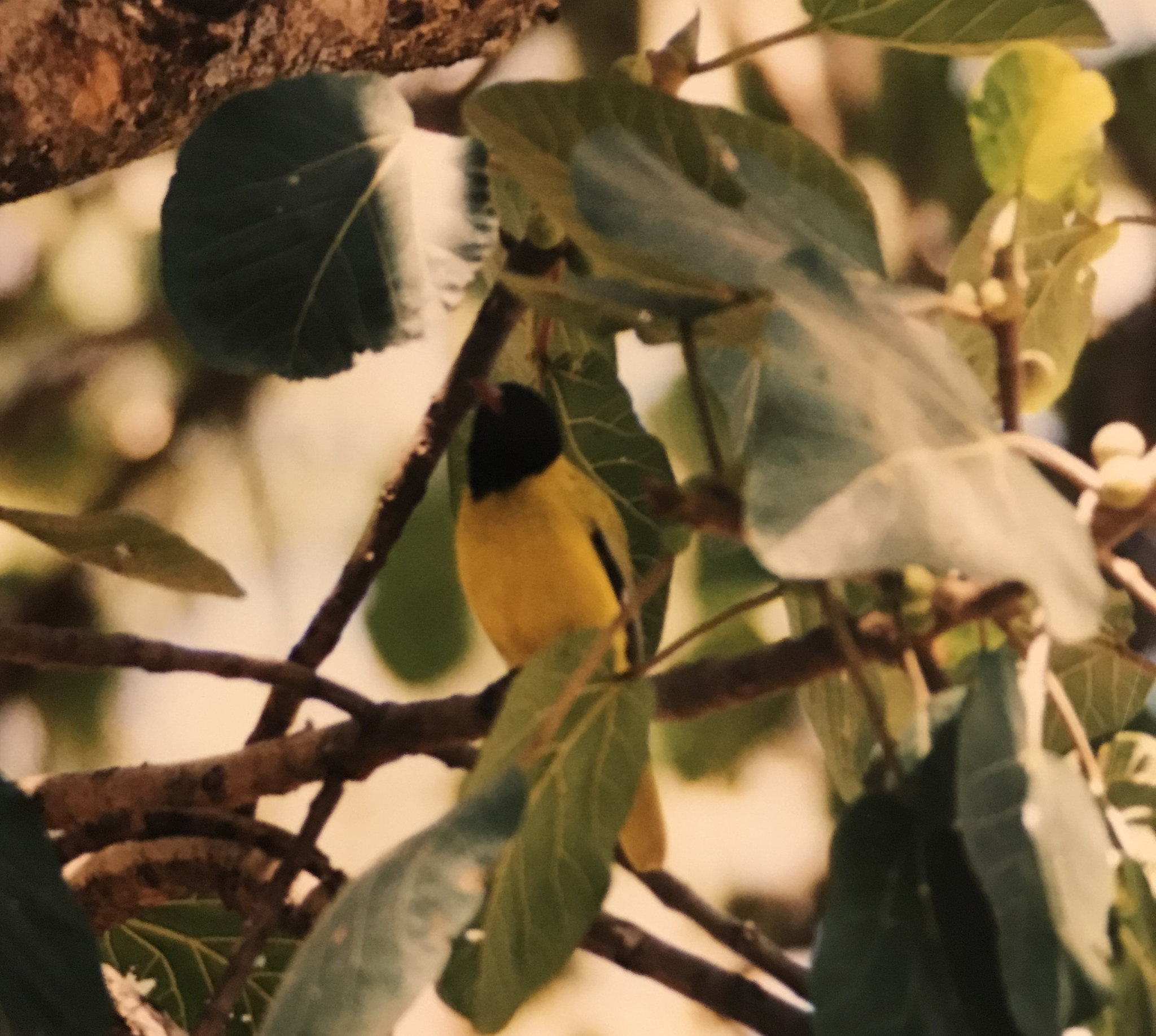

Conservation status
- Least Concern (IUCN 3.1)

Scientific classification
- Kingdom: Animalia
- Phylum: Chordata
- Class: Aves
- Order: Passeriformes
- Family: Oriolidae
- Genus: Oriolus
- Species: O. monacha

Binomial name
- Oriolus monacha (Gmelin, JF, 1789)

Synonyms
- Turdus monacha

= Ethiopian oriole =

Species of bird

The Ethiopian oriole (Oriolus monacha) is a species of bird in the family Oriolidae.

It is found in north-eastern Africa where its natural habitat is subtropical or tropical dry forests.

== Taxonomy ==
The Ethiopian oriole was formally described in 1789 by the German naturalist Johann Friedrich Gmelin in his revised and expanded edition of Carl Linnaeus's Systema Naturae. He placed it with the thrushes in the genus Turdus and coined the binomial name Turdus monacha. The specific epithet monacha is from Late Latin monachus meaning "monk". Gmelin based his description on "Le Moloxita" or "La religieuse d'Abissinie" that had been described in 1775 by the French polymath Comte de Buffon in his multi-volume Histoire Naturelle des Oiseaux. The Ethiopian oriole is now one of 30 orioles placed in the genus Oriolus that was introduced in 1766 by Linnaeus. Other common names include dark-headed or black-headed forest oriole and Abyssinian oriole.

=== Subspecies ===
Two subspecies are recognized:

- Oriolus monacha meneliki Blundell and Lovat, 1899 – Originally described as a separate species. Found in southern Ethiopia
- Oriolus monacha monacha (Gmelin, 1789) – Found in northern Ethiopia, Eritrea
