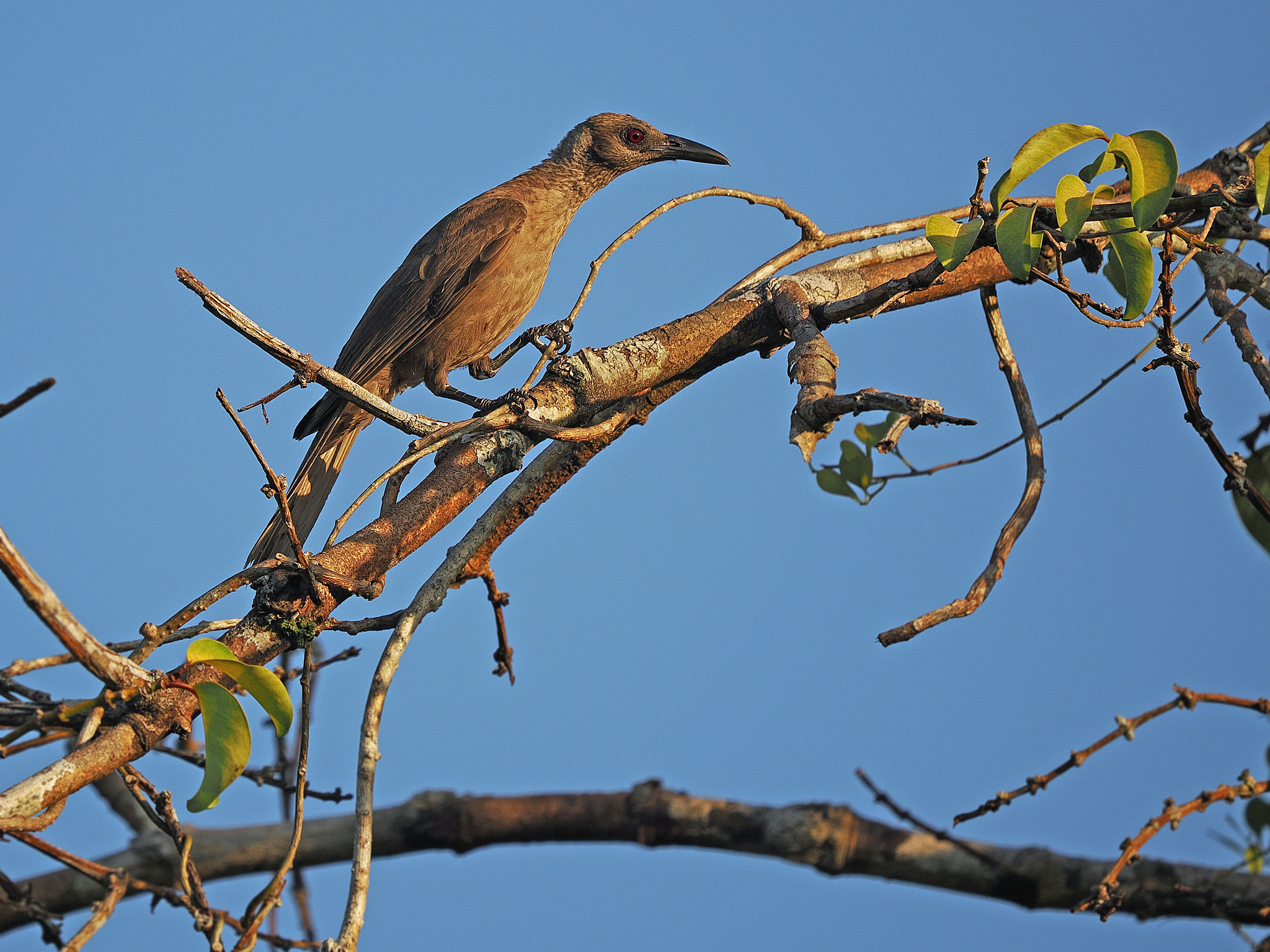

Conservation status
- Least Concern (IUCN 3.1)

Scientific classification
- Kingdom: Animalia
- Phylum: Chordata
- Class: Aves
- Order: Passeriformes
- Family: Oriolidae
- Genus: Oriolus
- Species: O. decipiens

Binomial name
- Oriolus decipiens (Sclater, P.L., 1883)

Synonyms
- Mimeta decipiens; Oriolus bouroensis decipiens

= Tanimbar oriole =

Species of bird

The Tanimbar oriole (Oriolus decipiens) is a species of bird in the family Oriolidae. It is endemic to the Tanimbar Islands.

Its natural habitats are subtropical or tropical moist lowland forests, subtropical or tropical mangrove forests, and subtropical or tropical moist montane forests. Until 2008, the Tanimbar oriole was classified as a subspecies of the black-eared oriole. Some authorities have not yet recognized this split and classification of Tanimbar oriole as a distinct species in its own right.
