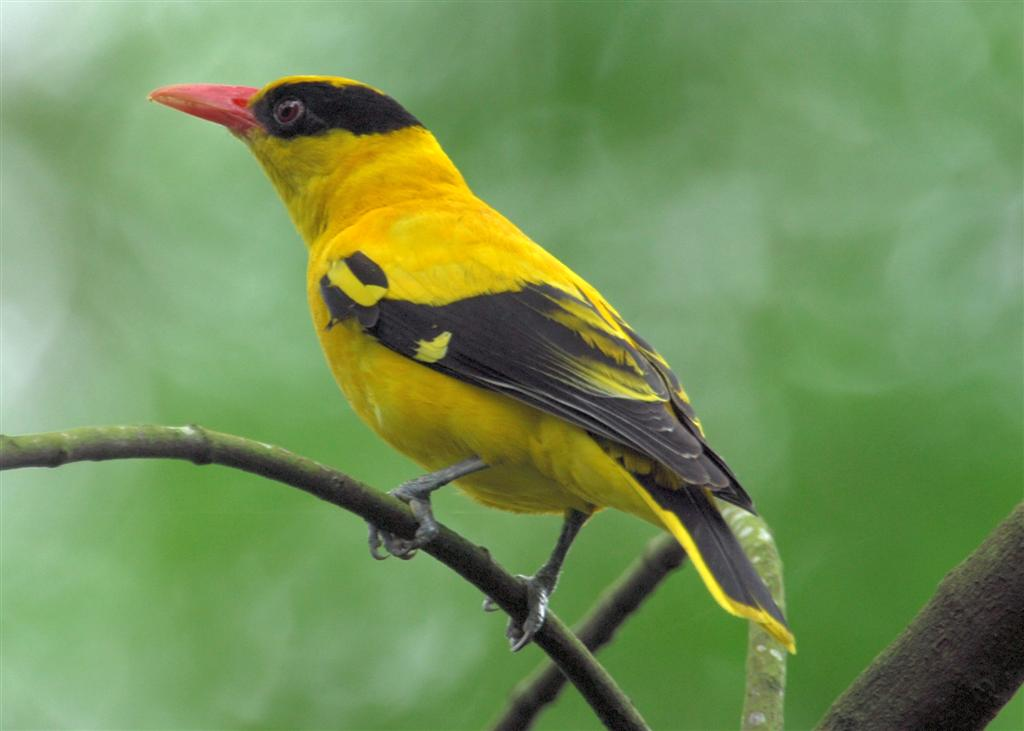
- Black-naped oriole (Oriolus chinensis)

Scientific classification
- Kingdom: Animalia
- Phylum: Chordata
- Class: Aves
- Order: Passeriformes
- Family: Oriolidae
- Genus: Oriolus; Linnaeus, 1766

Type species
- Oriolus galbula Linnaeus, 1766

Synonyms
- Analcipus; Broderipus; Mimeta; Psaropholus; Xanthonotus

= Oriolus =

Orioles

Genus of birds

Orioles are colourful Old World passerine birds in the genus Oriolus, the type genus of the corvoidean family Oriolidae. They are not closely related to the New World orioles, which are icterids (family Icteridae) that belong to the superfamily Passeroidea.

== Taxonomy and systematics ==
The genus Oriolus was erected in 1766 by the Swedish naturalist Carl Linnaeus in the 12th edition of his Systema Naturae. The type species is, by tautonomy, Oriolus galbula Linnaeus, 1766. This is a junior synonym of Coracias oriolus Linnaeus, 1758, the Eurasian golden oriole. In 1760, French ornithologist Mathurin Jacques Brisson in his Ornithologie used Oriolus as a subdivision of the genus Turdus, but the International Commission on Zoological Nomenclature ruled in 1955 that "Oriolus Brisson, 1760" should be suppressed. Linnaeus added more than a dozen additional genera when he updated his 10th edition, but he generally based new genera on those that had been introduced by Brisson in his Ornithologie. Oriolus is now the only genus for which Linnaeus's 12th edition is cited as the original publication. The name is derived from the old French word oriol, which is echoic in origin, derived from the call of the bird, but some authors have suggested origins in classical Latin aureolus meaning "golden". Various forms of "oriole" have existed in Romance languages since the 12th and 13th centuries.

=== Extant species ===
- - - szalayi
    - - melanotis
      - flavocinctus
  - sagitattus
    - - phaeochromus
      - - bouroensis
        - forsteni
- - - - - chlorocephalus
        - brachyrhynchus
      - xanthornus
    - - - - - - nigripennis
              - percivali
            - larvatus
          - monacha
        - - - - diffusus
              - - - oriolus
                  - kundoo
                - - chinensis (part)
                  - melanisticus
            - maculatus
          - auratus
      - - - hosii
          - cruentus
        - - mellianus
          - trailli
  - - xanthonotus
    - - steerei
      - - albiloris
        - isabellae

Relatedness of species within the genus: Two forms that have not been included in the sequencing and analysis are O. crassirostris, which is expected to be close to O. brachyrhynchus, and O. tenuirostris, which is expected to be close to O. diffusus

The genus contains 32 species:

Image	Common name	Scientific name	Distribution
	Brown oriole	Oriolus szalayi	New Guinea
	Dusky-brown oriole	Oriolus phaeochromus	North Maluku
	Grey-collared oriole	Oriolus forsteni	Seram
	Black-eared oriole	Oriolus bouroensis	Buru Island
	Tanimbar oriole	Oriolus decipiens	Tanimbar Islands
	Timor oriole	Oriolus melanotis	Timor, Rote and Semau Islands
	Wetar oriole	Oriolus finschi	Wetar and Atauro Islands
	Olive-backed oriole	Oriolus sagittatus	eastern Australia and south-central New Guinea.
	Green oriole	Oriolus flavocinctus	Australia and New Guinea
	Dark-throated oriole	Oriolus xanthonotus	Southeast Asia through Malay Peninsula, Sumatra, Bangka, Java and southwestern Borneo
	Ventriloquial oriole	Oriolus consobrinus	Borneo and the Philippines
	Philippine oriole	Oriolus steerii	the Philippines
	White-lored oriole	Oriolus albiloris	Luzon Island (the Philippines)
	Isabela oriole	Oriolus isabellae	Luzon
	Eurasian golden oriole	Oriolus oriolus	Europe and western Asia, and spends the winter season in central and southern Africa
	Indian golden oriole	Oriolus kundoo	Indian subcontinent and Central Asia
	African golden oriole	Oriolus auratus	Africa south of the Sahara desert
	Slender-billed oriole	Oriolus tenuirostris	eastern Himalayas to Southeast Asia
	Black-naped oriole	Oriolus chinensis	eastern Siberia, Ussuriland, northeastern China, Korea and northern Vietnam
	Green-headed oriole	Oriolus chlorocephalus	eastern Africa
	São Tomé oriole	Oriolus crassirostris	island of São Tomé
	Western oriole	Oriolus brachyrynchus	African tropical rainforest
	Ethiopian oriole	Oriolus monacha	north-eastern Africa
	Mountain oriole	Oriolus percivali	Albertine Rift montane forests, Uganda and Kenya
	Black-headed oriole	Oriolus larvatus	Africa
	Black-winged oriole	Oriolus nigripennis	African tropical rainforest
	Black-hooded oriole	Oriolus xanthornus	tropical southern Asia from India and Sri Lanka east to Indonesia
	Black oriole	Oriolus hosii	Sarawak in Borneo
	Black-and-crimson oriole	Oriolus consanguineus	Indonesia and Malaysia
	Javan oriole	Oriolus cruentus	Indonesia
	Maroon oriole	Oriolus traillii	Southeast Asia
	Silver oriole	Oriolus mellianus	southern China and winters in mainland Southeast Asia

=== Former species ===
Formerly, some authorities also considered these species (or subspecies) as species within the genus Oriolus:

- Green figbird (as Oriolus viridis)
- Brown-eared bulbul (squamiceps) (as Oriolus squamiceps)

== Distribution and habitat ==
The orioles are a mainly tropical group, although one species, the Eurasian golden oriole, breeds in temperate regions.
