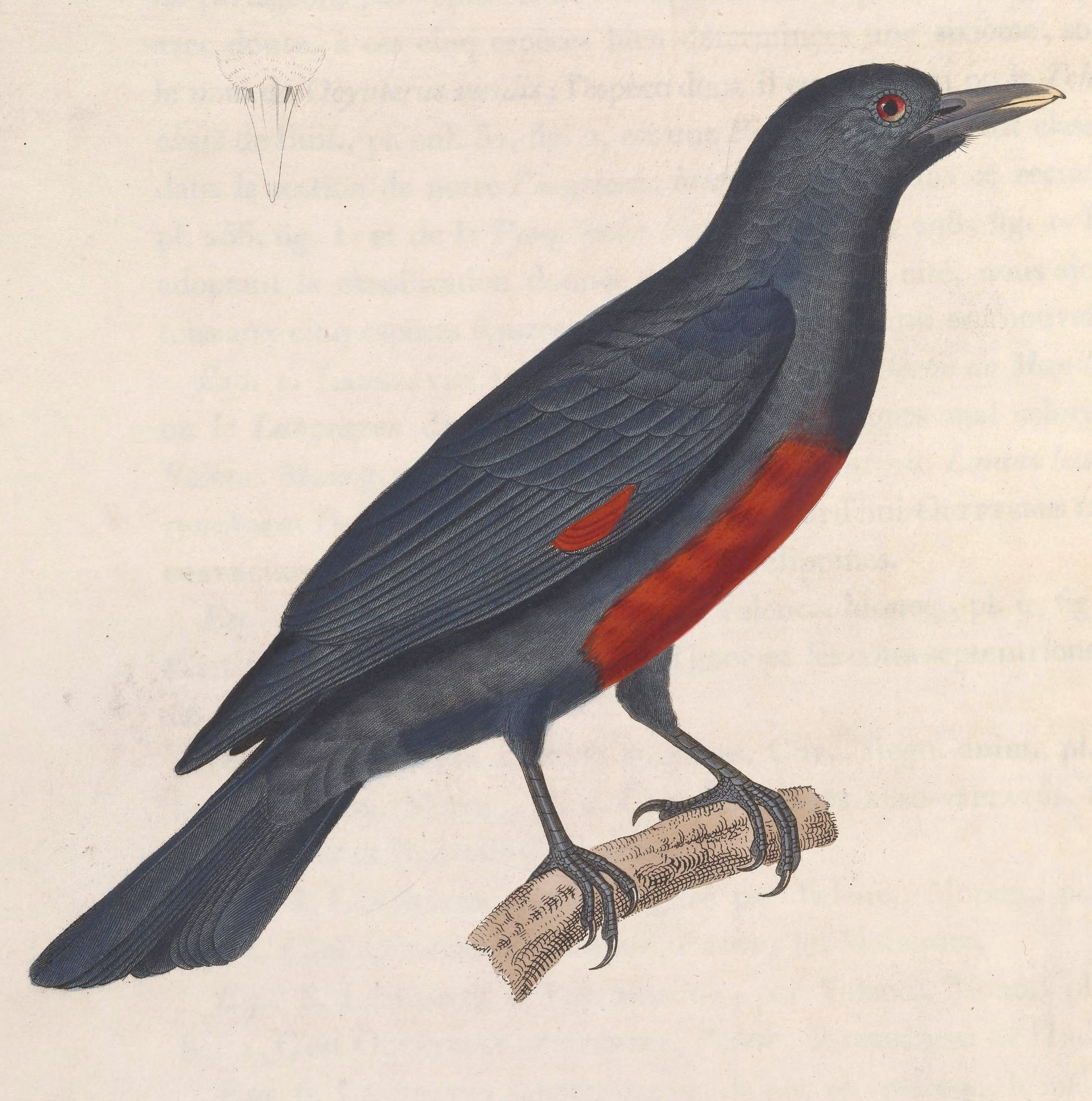

Conservation status
- Data Deficient (IUCN 3.1)

Scientific classification
- Kingdom: Animalia
- Phylum: Chordata
- Class: Aves
- Order: Passeriformes
- Family: Oriolidae
- Genus: Oriolus
- Species: O. cruentus

Binomial name
- Oriolus cruentus (Wagler, 1827)

= Javan oriole =

Species of bird

The Javan oriole (Oriolus cruentus) is a species of bird in the family Oriolidae.

It is found on Java in Indonesia where its natural habitats are subtropical or tropical moist lowland forest and subtropical or tropical moist montane forest.

Temuan people believe that its song brings bad luck.
