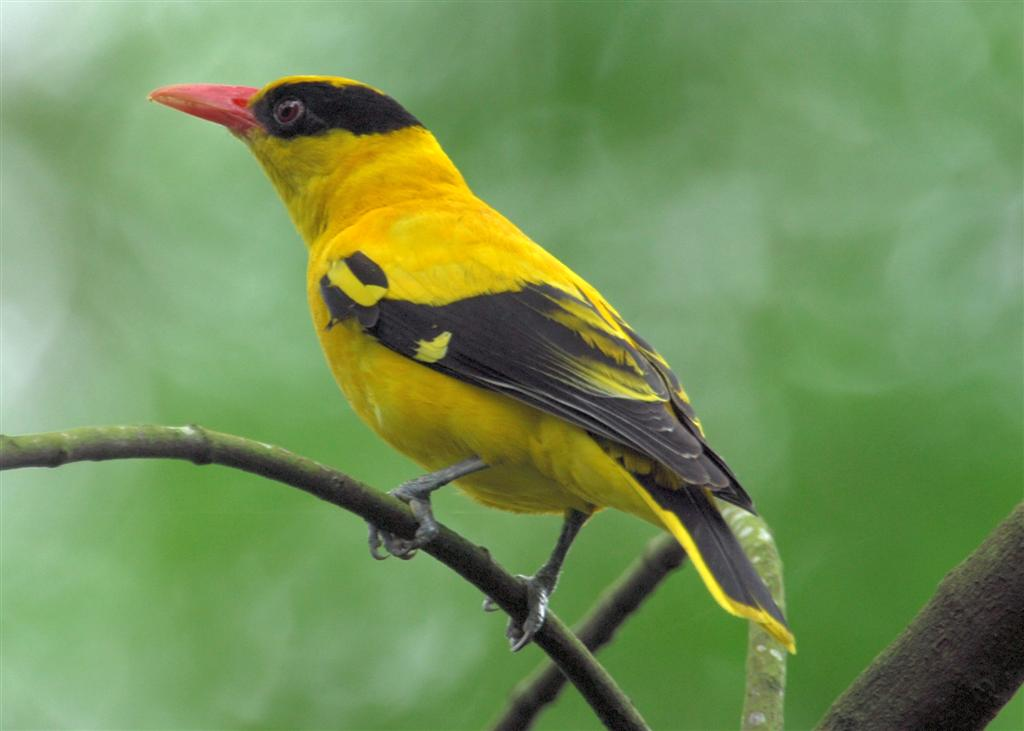
- Black-naped oriole (Oriolus chinensis)

Scientific classification
- Kingdom: Animalia
- Phylum: Chordata
- Class: Aves
- Order: Passeriformes
- Superfamily: Orioloidea
- Family: Oriolidae; Vigors, 1825

Type genus
- Oriolus Linnaeus, 1766

Genera
- See text

= Old World oriole =

Oriolidae

Family of birds

The Old World orioles (Oriolidae) are an Old World family of passerine birds. The family contains 41 species which are divided in 4 genera. The family includes two extinct species from New Zealand that are placed in the genus Turnagra.

== Taxonomy and systematics ==
The family Oriolidae comprises the piopios, figbirds, pitohuis and the Old World orioles. The piopios were added in 2011, having been formerly placed in the family Turnagridae. Several other genera have been proposed to split up the genus Oriolus. For example, the African black-headed species are sometimes placed in a separate genus, Baruffius. The family Oriolidae is not closely related to the New World orioles, despite their similar size, diet, behaviour and contrasting plumage patterns. Rather, these similarities are an example of convergent evolution.

=== Extant genera ===
There are three extant genera in the family Oriolidae:

Image	Genus	Species
	Sphecotheres Vieillot, 1816 – figbirds	Green figbird (Sphecotheres viridis); Wetar figbird (Sphecotheres hypoleucus); Australasian figbird (Sphecotheres vieilloti)
	Pitohui Lesson, 1831 – pitohuis	Northern variable pitohui (Pitohui kirhocephalus); Raja Ampat pitohui (Pitohui cerviniventris); Southern variable pitohui (Pitohui uropygialis); Hooded pitohui (Pitohui dichrous)
	Oriolus Linnaeus, 1766 – orioles	Brown oriole (Oriolus szalayi); Dusky-brown oriole (Oriolus phaeochromus); Grey-collared oriole (Oriolus forsteni); Black-eared oriole (Oriolus bouroensis); Tanimbar oriole (Oriolus decipiens); Olive-brown oriole (Oriolus melanotis ); Timor oriole (Oriolus melanotis); Wetar oriole (Oriolus finschi); Olive-backed oriole (Oriolus sagittatus); Green oriole (Oriolus flavocinctus); Dark-throated oriole (Oriolus xanthonotus); Ventriloquial oriole (Oriolus consobrinus); Philippine oriole (Oriolus steerii); White-lored oriole (Oriolus albiloris); Isabela oriole (Oriolus isabellae); Eurasian golden oriole (Oriolus oriolus); Indian golden oriole (Oriolus kundoo); African golden oriole (Oriolus auratus); Slender-billed oriole (Oriolus tenuirostris); Black-naped oriole (Oriolus chinensis); Green-headed oriole (Oriolus chlorocephalus); São Tomé oriole (Oriolus crassirostris); Western oriole (Oriolus brachyrynchus); Ethiopian oriole ( Oriolus monacha); Mountain oriole (Oriolus percivali); Black-headed oriole (Oriolus larvatus); Black-winged oriole (Oriolus nigripennis); Black-hooded oriole (Oriolus xanthornus); Black oriole (Oriolus hosii); Black-and-crimson oriole (Oriolus consanguineus); Javan oriole (Oriolus cruentus); Maroon oriole (Oriolus traillii); Silver oriole (Oriolus mellianus)

=== Extinct genera ===
There are at least two extinct genera in the family Oriolidae:

- Genus Turnagra – piopios (2 extinct species)
- Genus Longmornis – Longmornis robustirostrata

== Description ==
The orioles and figbirds are medium-sized passerines, around 20–30 cm in length, with the females only slightly smaller than the males. The beak is slightly curved and hooked, and, except in the figbirds, as long again as the head. The plumage of most species is bright and showy, although the females often have duller plumage than the males do. The plumage of many Australasian orioles mimics that of friarbirds (a genus of large honeyeaters), probably to reduce aggression against the smaller orioles.

== Distribution and habitat ==
The family is distributed across Europe, Africa, Asia, and Australia. The few temperate nesting species are migratory, and some tropical species also show seasonal movements.

== Behaviour and ecology ==
=== Breeding ===
Orioles are monogamous, breeding in territorial pairs (although the Australasian figbird, and possibly also the other figbirds, breed in loose colonies). Nesting sites may be chosen near aggressive species such as shrikes, drongos or friarbirds, which confer a degree of protection. The nest is a deep woven cup suspended like a hammock from a branch. They usually lay two or three eggs, but as many as six have been recorded.

=== Food and feeding ===
Orioles are arboreal and tend to feed in the canopy. Many species are able to survive in open forests and woodlands, although a few are restricted to closed forest. They are opportunistic omnivores, with the main components of their diet being fruit, berries, arthropods, and nectar.
