= Longmornis =

Longmornis Temporal range: Early Miocene 23–16 Ma

Scientific classification
- Domain: Eukaryota
- Kingdom: Animalia
- Phylum: Chordata
- Class: Aves
- Order: Passeriformes
- Family: Oriolidae
- Genus: †Longmornis; Boles, 1999
- Species: †L. robustirostrata

Binomial name
- †Longmornis robustirostrata Boles, 1999

Extinct genus of birds

Longmornis robustirostrata is an extinct genus and species of bird in the Old World oriole family. It was described from Early Miocene material (a complete large mandible) found at the Neville's Garden fossil site at Riversleigh in north-western Queensland, Australia. Its closest living relatives are the figbirds (Sphecotheres), which its beak most closely resembles. It was named in honour of Noel Wayne Longmore, an ornithologist of the Australian Museum, and for its broad, robustly built beak. It was a mid to large-sized passerine, comparable in size to the Australian black-faced cuckooshrike, and was presumed to be a frugivore like modern figbirds.
