= Timor oriole =

- Female

Conservation status
- Least Concern (IUCN 3.1)

Scientific classification
- Kingdom: Animalia
- Phylum: Chordata
- Class: Aves
- Order: Passeriformes
- Family: Oriolidae
- Genus: Oriolus
- Species: O. melanotis

Binomial name
- Oriolus melanotis Bonaparte, 1850

Synonyms
- Mimeta melanotis; Oriolus viridifuscus

Species of bird

The Timor oriole (Oriolus melanotis) is a species of bird in the family Oriolidae. It is endemic to the Lesser Sunda Islands, where it is found on Timor, Rote and Semau. Its natural habitats are subtropical or tropical dry forests and subtropical or tropical mangrove forests.

== Taxonomy and systematics ==
The Wetar oriole (O. finschi), found on Wetar and Atauro Islands, was originally described as a separate species but was later reclassified as a subspecies. However, more recent revisions to the IOC World Bird List have found it to be a distinct species. The two species were formerly grouped together as olive-brown oriole.
