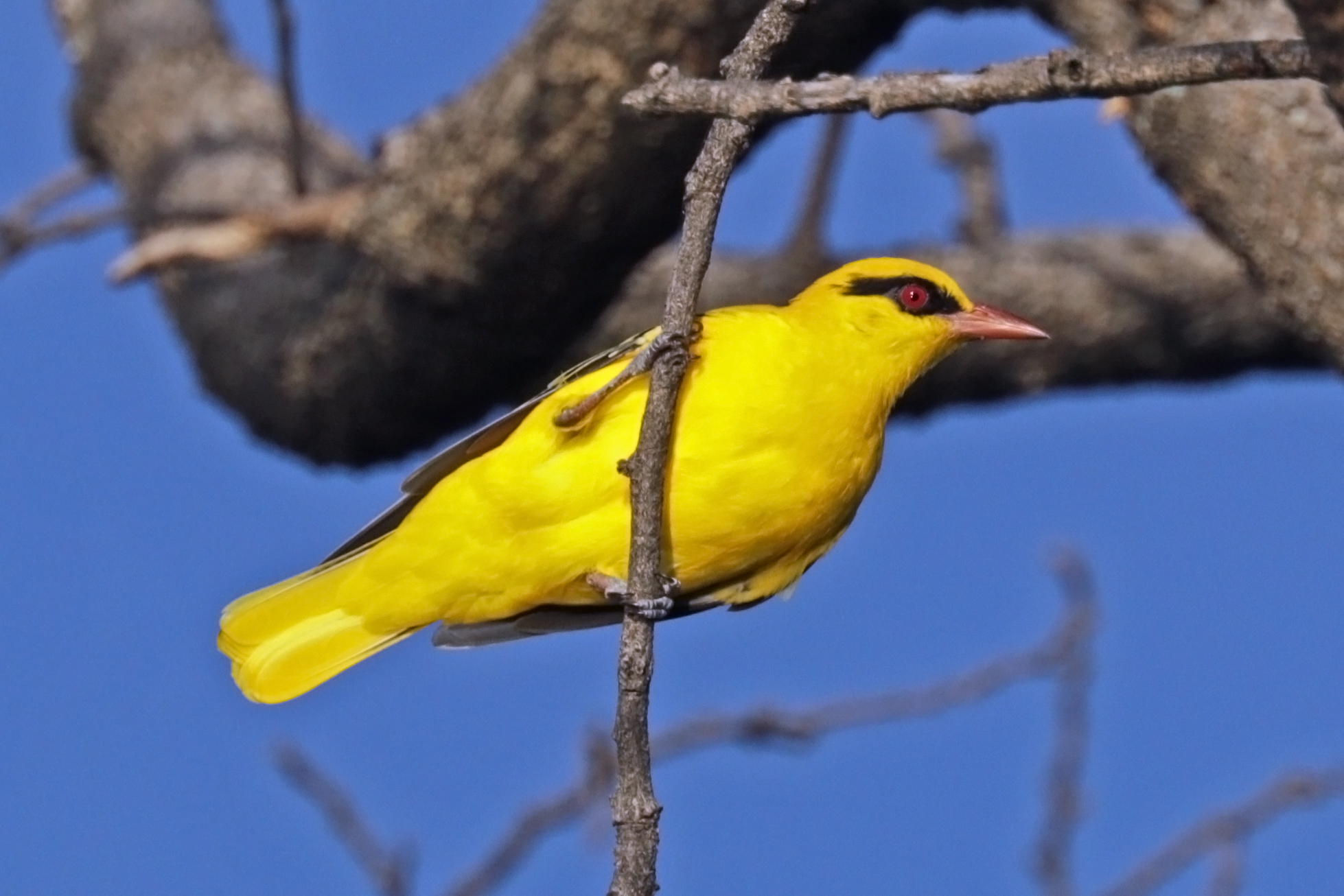
- O. a. notatus Zambezi River, Zimbabwe

Conservation status
- Least Concern (IUCN 3.1)

Scientific classification
- Kingdom: Animalia
- Phylum: Chordata
- Class: Aves
- Order: Passeriformes
- Family: Oriolidae
- Genus: Oriolus
- Species: O. auratus

Binomial name
- Oriolus auratus Vieillot, 1817

Synonyms
- Oriolus striatus

= African golden oriole =

Species of bird

The African golden oriole (Oriolus auratus), or African oriole, is a member of the oriole family of passerine birds which is a resident breeder in Africa south of the Sahara desert.

It is a bird of thick bush and other well-wooded areas. The hanging basket-shaped nest is built in a tree, and contains two eggs. The food is insects and fruit, especially figs, found in the tree canopies where the orioles spend much of their time.

== Taxonomy and systematics ==
The name "oriole" was first recorded (in the Latin form oriolus) by Albertus Magnus in about 1250, and was stated to be onomatopoeic, from the song of the golden oriole.

The New World orioles are similar in appearance to the Oriolidae, but are icterids unrelated to the Old World birds.

=== Subspecies ===
Two subspecies are recognized:

- Senegal golden oriole (O. a. auratus) - Vieillot, 1817: Found from Senegal and Gambia to western Ethiopia and southern Somalia
- South African golden oriole (O. a. notatus) - Peters, W, 1868: Originally described as a separate species. Found from Angola to central Mozambique

== Description ==
The male is striking in the typical oriole black and yellow plumage, although the plumage is predominantly yellow, with solid black only in the flight feathers and tail centre. There is a great deal of gold in the wings, which is a distinction from the Eurasian golden oriole, which winters in Africa.

The female is a drabber green bird, distinguished from the European species by more contrasting wings and black around the eye. Orioles are shy, and even the male is remarkably difficult to see in the dappled yellow and green leaves of the canopy.

The flight is somewhat like a thrush, strong and direct with some shallow dips over longer distances.

The call is a screech like a jay, but the song is a beautiful fluting fee-ooo fee-ooo, unmistakable once heard.
