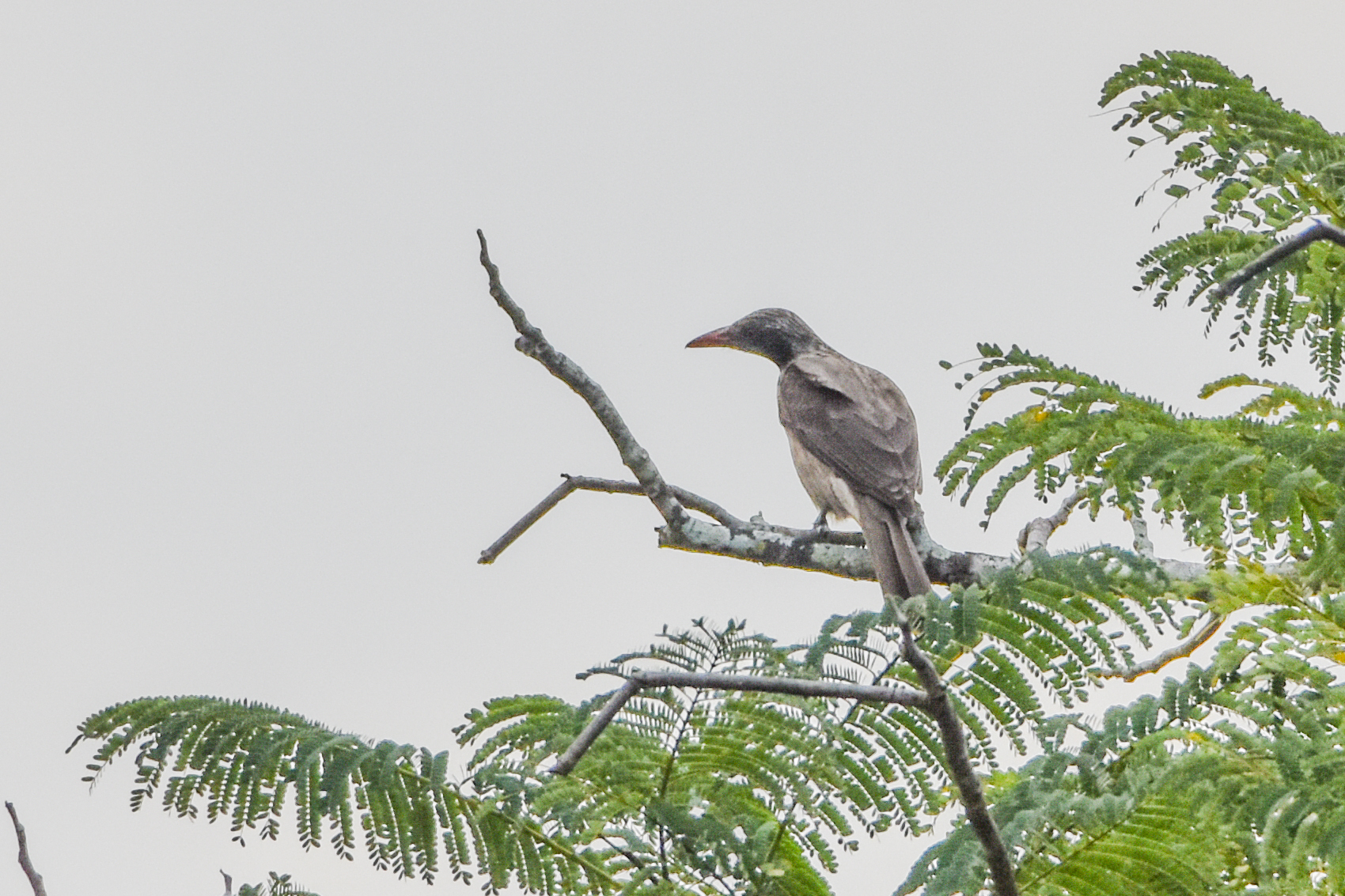

Conservation status
- Least Concern (IUCN 3.1)

Scientific classification
- Kingdom: Animalia
- Phylum: Chordata
- Class: Aves
- Order: Passeriformes
- Family: Oriolidae
- Genus: Oriolus
- Species: O. szalayi

Binomial name
- Oriolus szalayi (Madarász, 1900)

Synonyms
- Mimeta szalayi

= Brown oriole =

Species of bird

The brown oriole (Oriolus szalayi) is a species of bird in the family Oriolidae.

It is found in New Guinea. Its natural habitats are subtropical or tropical dry forests, subtropical or tropical moist lowland forests, and subtropical or tropical mangrove forests. Alternate names for the brown oriole include the New Guinea oriole and striated oriole.
