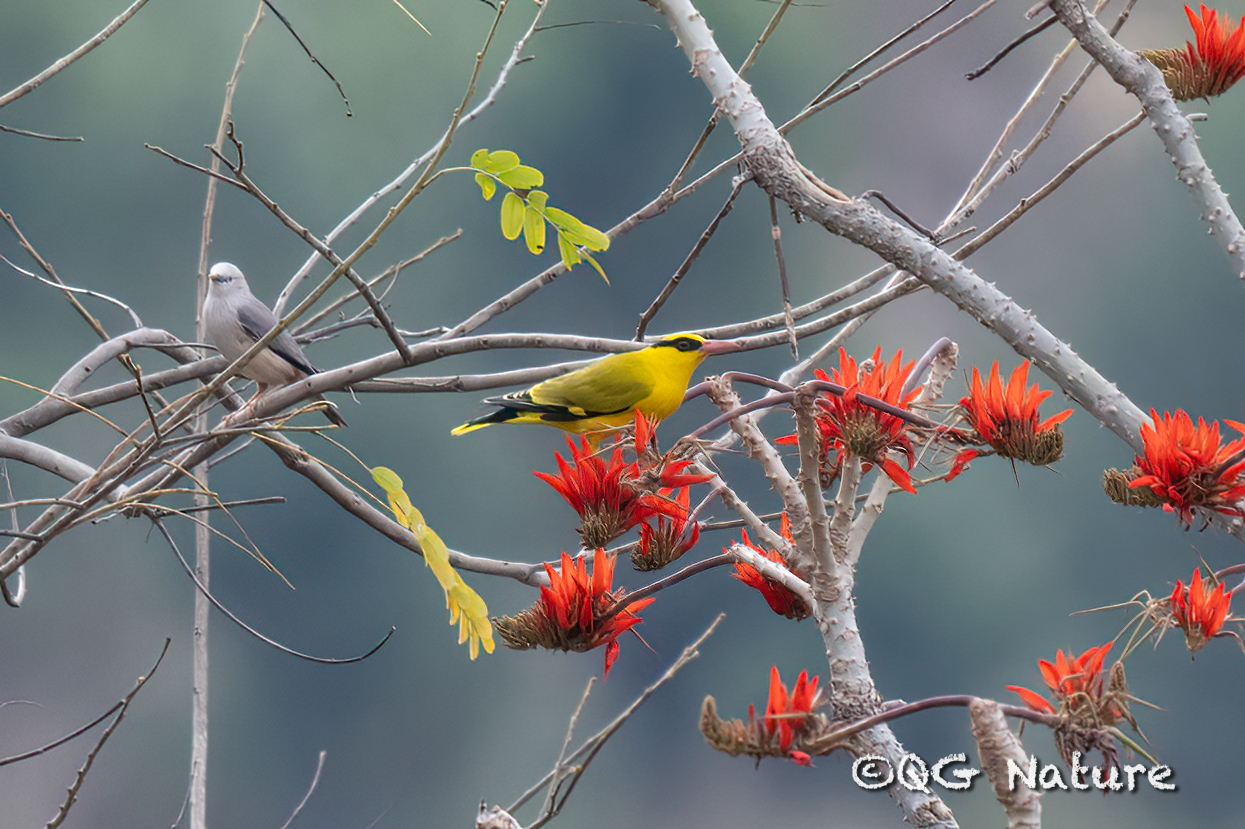
- Male
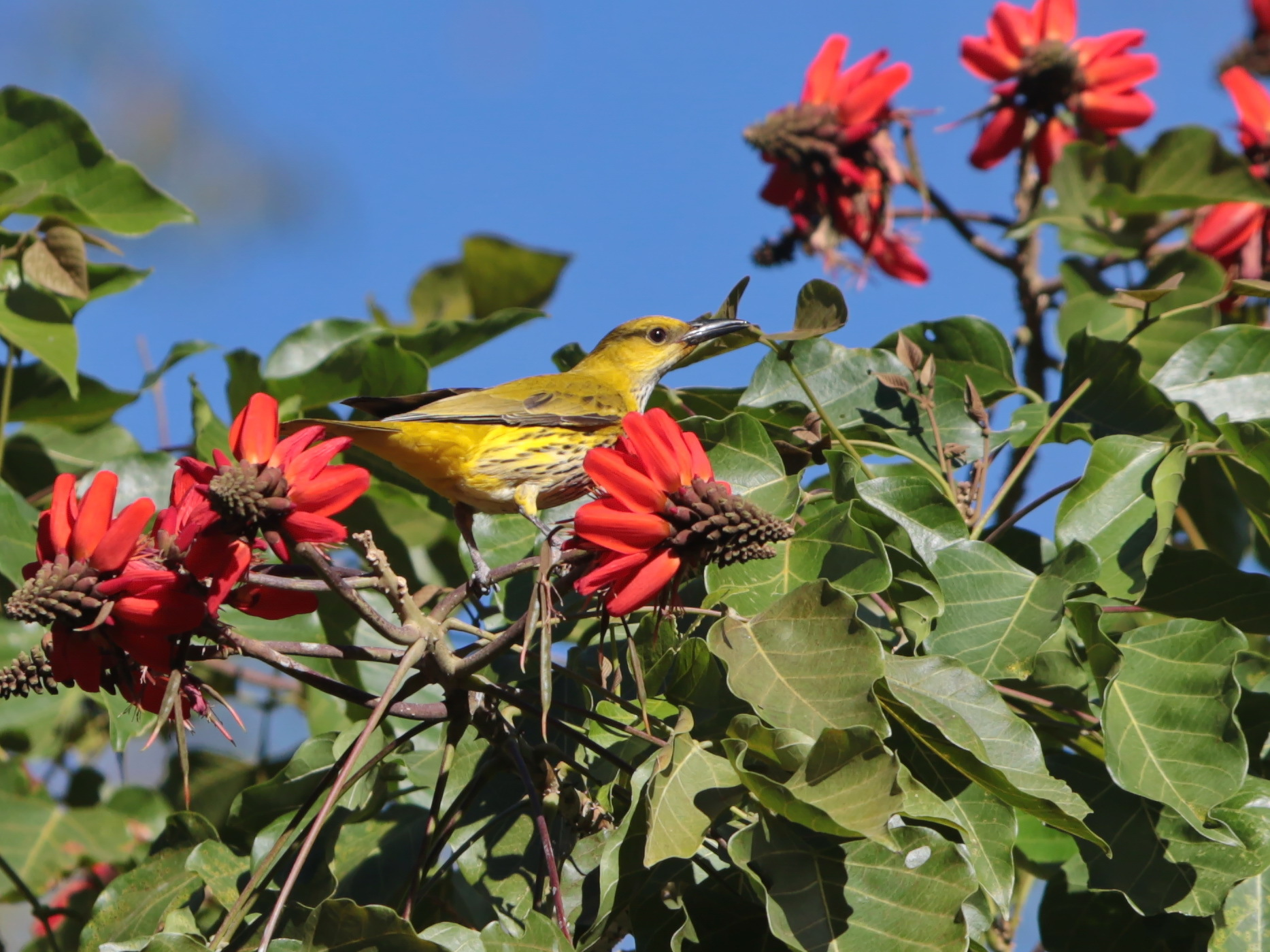
- Female

Conservation status
- Least Concern (IUCN 3.1)

Scientific classification
- Kingdom: Animalia
- Phylum: Chordata
- Class: Aves
- Order: Passeriformes
- Family: Oriolidae
- Genus: Oriolus
- Species: O. tenuirostris

Binomial name
- Oriolus tenuirostris Blyth, 1846

= Slender-billed oriole =

Species of bird

The slender-billed oriole (Oriolus tenuirostris) is a species of bird in the family Oriolidae found from the eastern Himalayas to Southeast Asia.

Its natural habitats are subtropical or tropical moist lowland forests and subtropical or tropical moist montane forests.

== Taxonomy and systematics ==
=== Subspecies ===
Two subspecies are recognized:

- O. t. invisus - Riley, 1940: Found in southern Vietnam
- O. t. tenuirostris - Blyth, 1846: Found from the eastern Himalayas to southern China and central Vietnam
