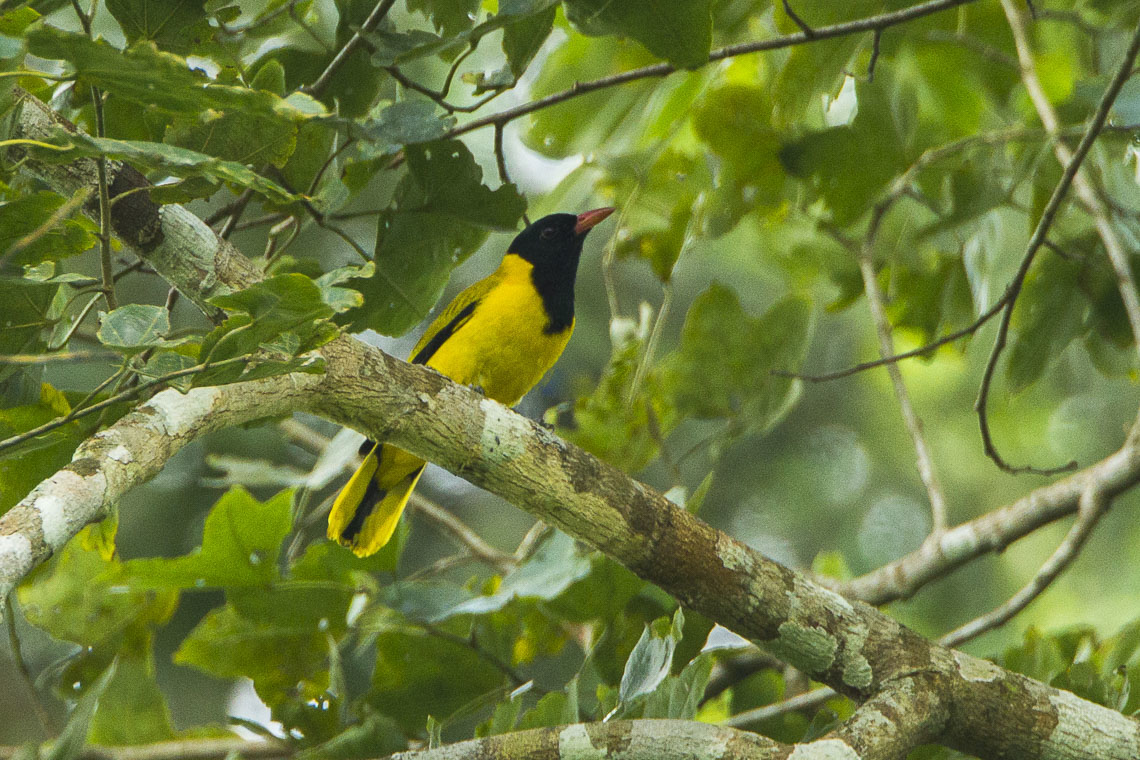

Conservation status
- Least Concern (IUCN 3.1)

Scientific classification
- Kingdom: Animalia
- Phylum: Chordata
- Class: Aves
- Order: Passeriformes
- Family: Oriolidae
- Genus: Oriolus
- Species: O. nigripennis

Binomial name
- Oriolus nigripennis Verreaux & Verreaux, 1855

= Black-winged oriole =

Species of bird

The black-winged oriole (Oriolus nigripennis) is a species of bird in the family Oriolidae. It is found in Africa from Sierra Leone and Liberia to southern South Sudan, western Uganda, central Democratic Republic of Congo and north-western Angola.

Its natural habitats are subtropical or tropical moist lowland forests and subtropical or tropical mangrove forests.

Some authorities have considered the mountain oriole to be a subspecies of the black-winged oriole.
