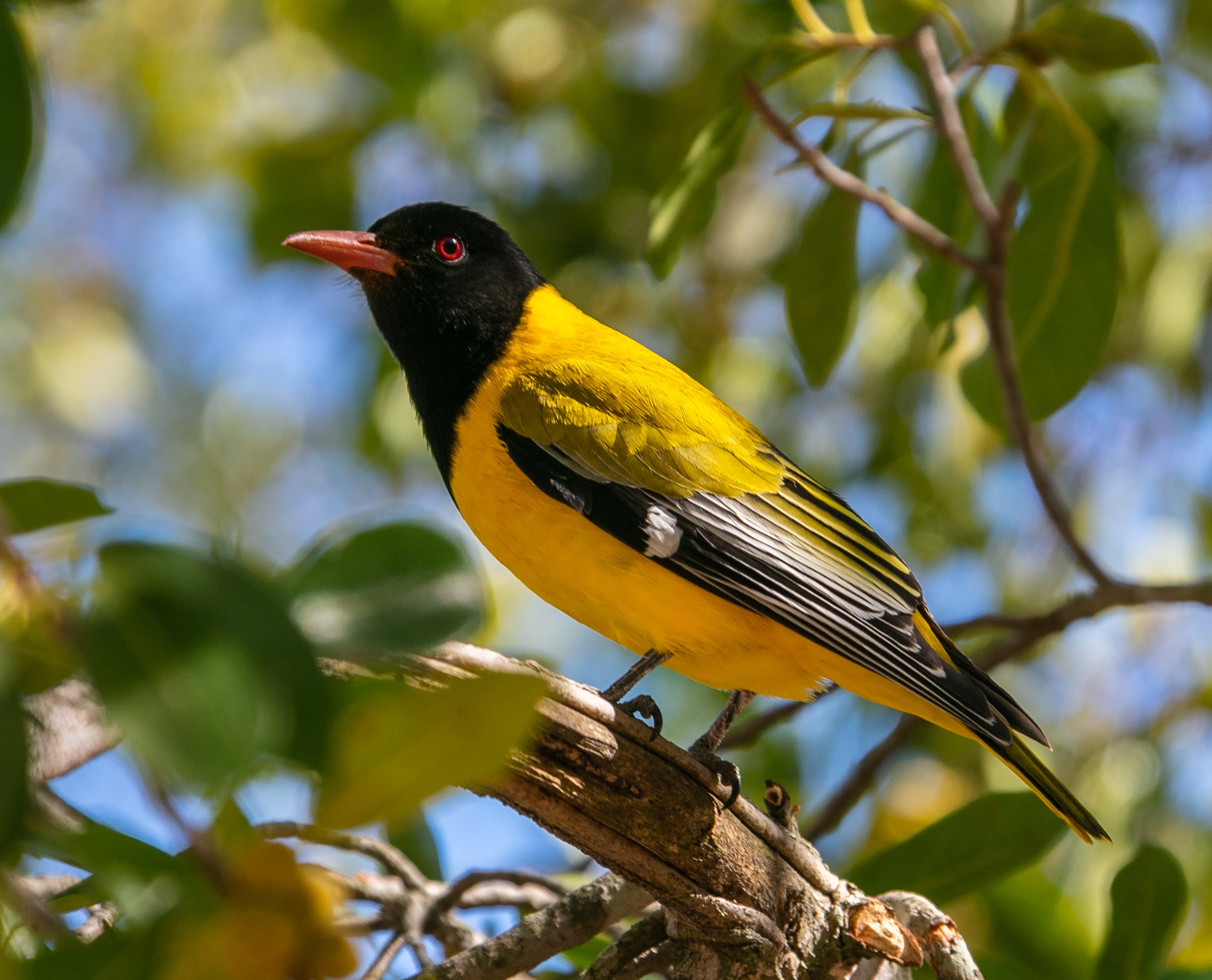

Conservation status
- Least Concern (IUCN 3.1)

Scientific classification
- Kingdom: Animalia
- Phylum: Chordata
- Class: Aves
- Order: Passeriformes
- Family: Oriolidae
- Genus: Oriolus
- Species: O. larvatus

Binomial name
- Oriolus larvatus Lichtenstein, MHC, 1823
- resident range

Audio
- Song recorded in the Masai Mara Game Reserve, Kenya

= Black-headed oriole =

Species of bird

The black-headed oriole (Oriolus larvatus) is a species of bird in the family Oriolidae. It is found in Africa and has a very striking appearance with a bright yellow body, contrasting black head and flesh-coloured beak.

== Taxonomy and systematics ==
Some authorities have considered the mountain oriole to be a subspecies of the black-headed oriole. Alternate names for the black-headed oriole include the African black-headed oriole, Eastern black-headed oriole and Eastern oriole.

=== Subspecies ===
Five subspecies are recognised:

- Oriolus larvatus rolleti – Salvadori, 1864: Originally described as a separate species. Found from southern Sudan and southern Ethiopia to eastern Democratic Republic of Congo and central Kenya
- Oriolus larvatus reichenowi – Zedlitz, 1916: Found from Somalia to eastern Tanzania
- Kenya black-headed oriole or tropical blackhead oriole (Oriolus larvatus angolensis) – Neumann, 1905: Found from Angola and Namibia to western Tanzania and northern Mozambique
- Oriolus larvatus tibicen – Lawson, 1962: Found from coastal southern Tanzania to coastal southern Mozambique
- Southern black-headed oriole (Oriolus larvatus larvatus) – Lichtenstein, MHK, 1823: Found from southern Zimbabwe to inland southern Mozambique and eastern South Africa
- Eastern blackhead oriole (Oriolus larvatus additus) – Lawson, 1969: Found in Eastern South African and southern Mozambique. Considered a synonym of O. l. tibicen and replacement name by the IOC.

== Description ==
The black-headed oriole has a bright yellow body, contrasting black head and flesh-coloured beak. The voice is a liquid-sounding warble, accompanied by imitations and whistles.

== Distribution and habitat ==
It breeds in much of sub-Saharan Africa from South Sudan and Ethiopia in the north to South Africa in the south.

It inhabits dry tropical forests, especially acacia and broad-leaved woodlands, and dense shrubland areas, where it is more often heard than seen despite the brightness of its plumage.

== Behaviour and ecology ==
The black-headed oriole forages in the canopy, feeding on small fruit as well as large insects. The young are fed mostly with caterpillars.

== Gallery ==
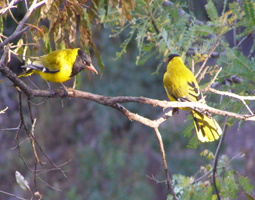
A pair in courtship ritual, riparian zone of central Waterberg, South Africa

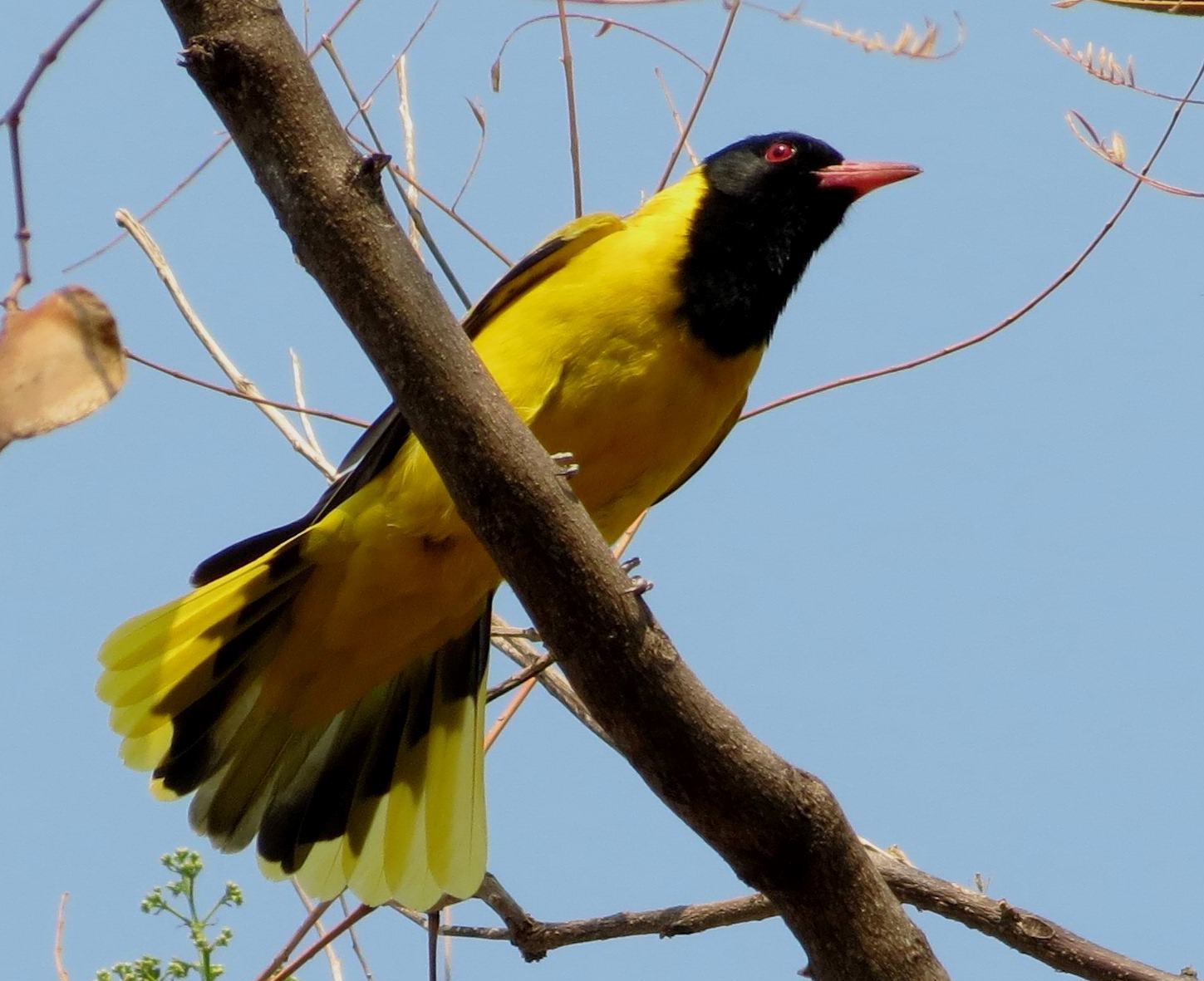
Tail-fanning is one element of oriole courtship

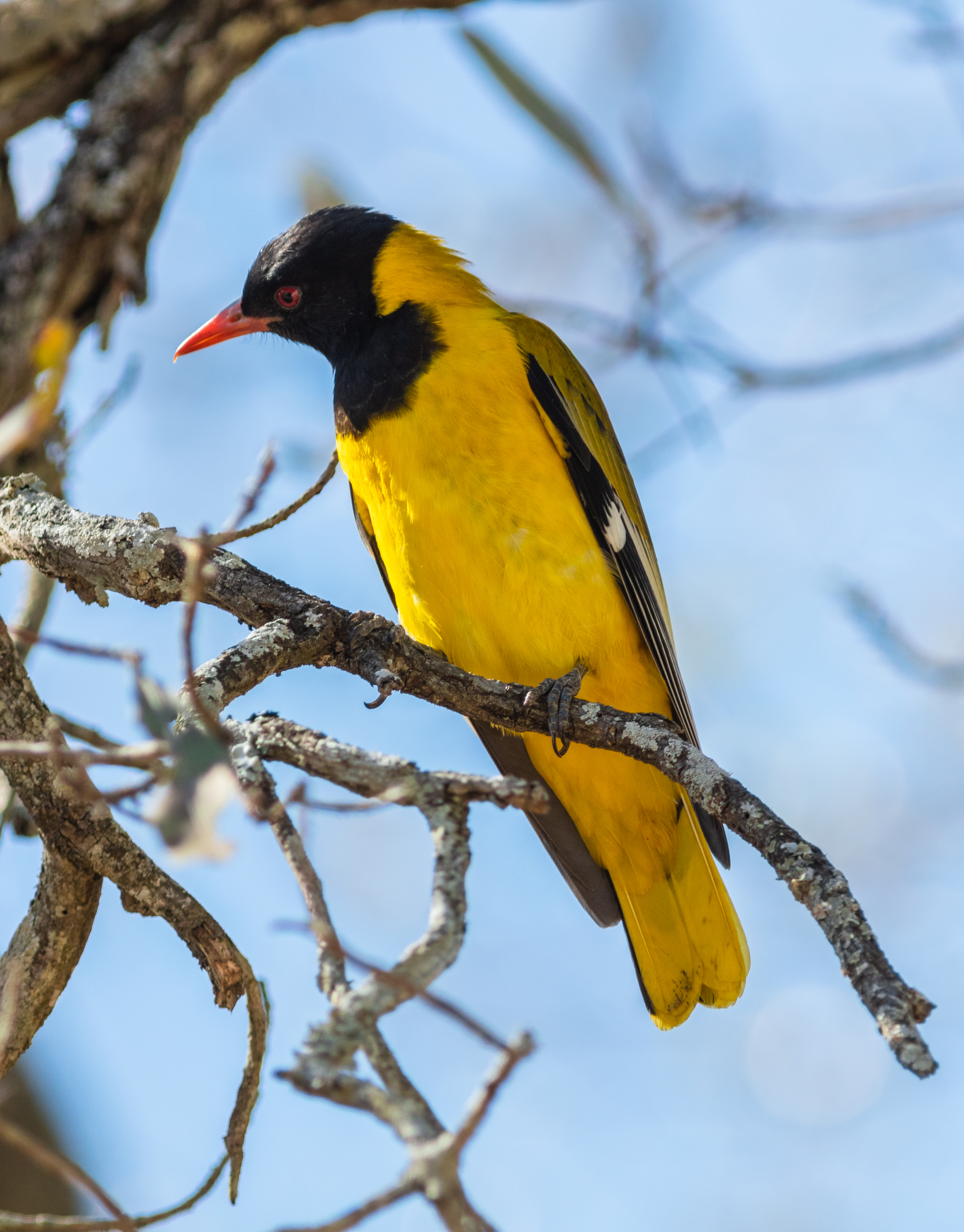
Individual in the Kruger Park, South Africa.
