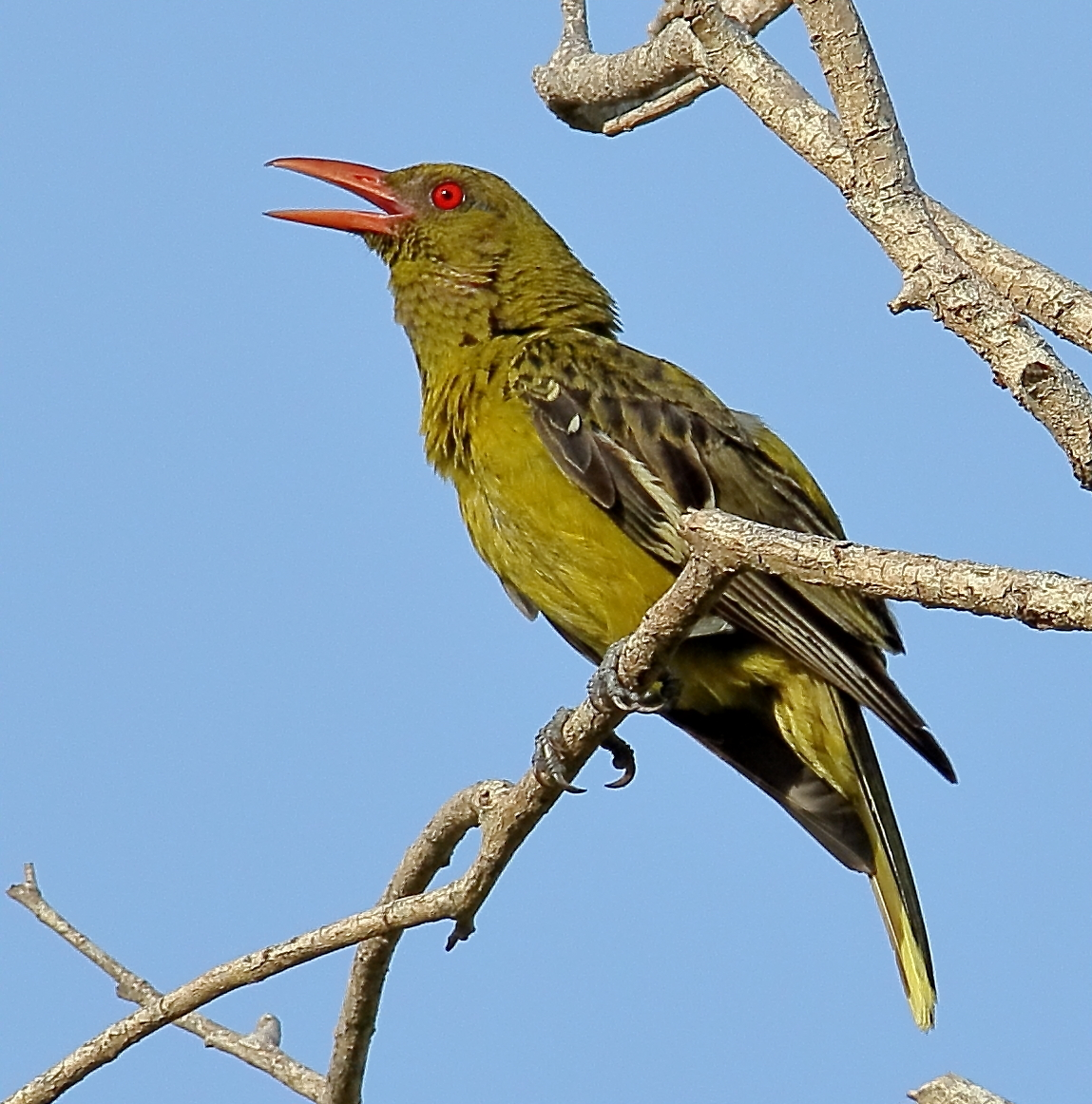

Conservation status
- Least Concern (IUCN 3.1)

Scientific classification
- Kingdom: Animalia
- Phylum: Chordata
- Class: Aves
- Order: Passeriformes
- Family: Oriolidae
- Genus: Oriolus
- Species: O. flavocinctus

Binomial name
- Oriolus flavocinctus (P.P. King, 1826)

Synonyms
- Mimetes flavocinctus

= Green oriole =

Species of bird

The green oriole or Australasian yellow oriole (Oriolus flavocinctus) is an inconspicuous inhabitant of lush tropical vegetation throughout Australia and New Guinea.

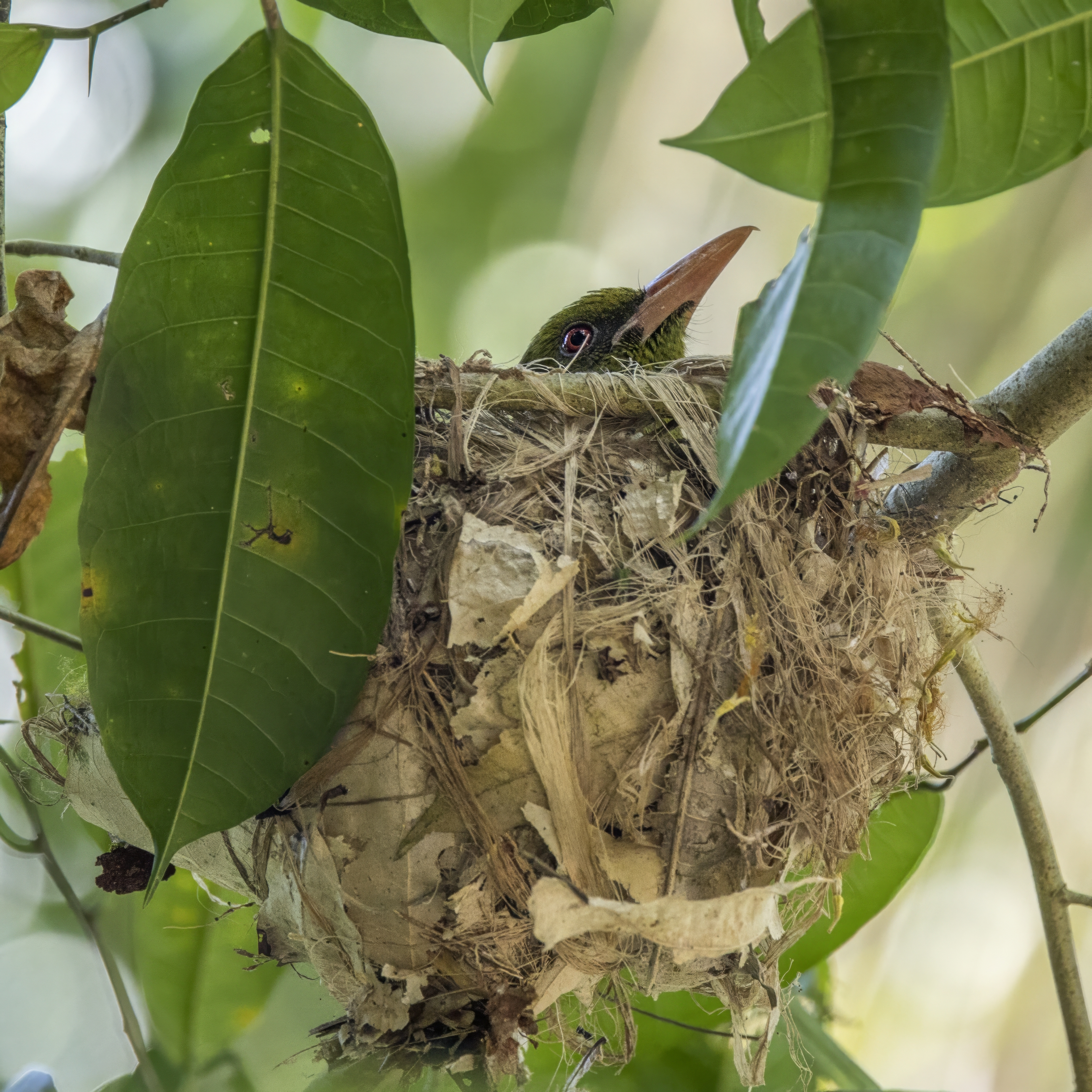
On nest, Daintree Rainforest, Queensland

== Taxonomy and systematics ==
Alternate names for the green oriole include the Australian yellow oriole, yellow oriole and yellow-bellied oriole.

=== Subspecies ===
Six subspecies are recognised:

- O. f. migrator - Hartert, 1904: Found in eastern Lesser Sundas
- O. f. muelleri - (Bonaparte, 1850): Originally described as a separate species. Found in south-central New Guinea
- O. f. flavocinctus - (King, P.P., 1826): Found in northern Australia
- O. f. tiwi - Schodde & Mason, IJ, 1999: Found on Bathurst and Melville Islands (off northern Australia)
- O. f. flavotinctus - Schodde & Mason, IJ, 1999: Found on Cape York Peninsula (north-eastern Australia)
- O. f. kingi - Mathews, 1912: Found in north-eastern Queensland (north-eastern Australia)

== Distribution and habitat ==
They are often difficult to locate, as their yellow-green plumage blends with the foliage and only their deep bubbling musical calls can be heard. They are nevertheless common in suitable habitat: rainforests, mangroves, thickets along watercourses, swamps, and lush gardens.

== Behaviour and ecology ==
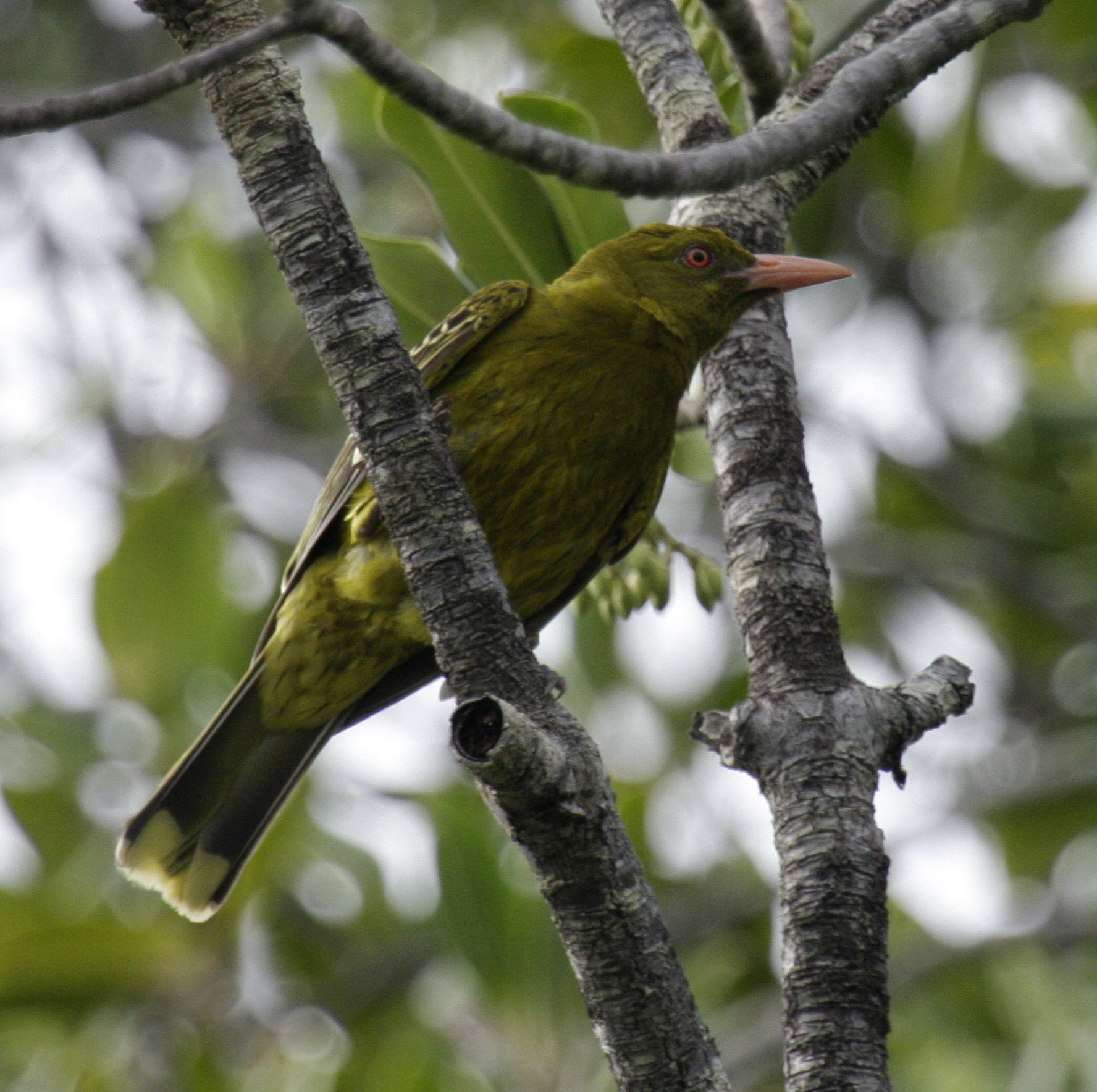
Yellow oriole, Cape York Peninsula

=== Breeding ===
Breeding takes place during the wet season (October to March). A neat, deep cup is constructed from strips of bark and vines, lined with rootlets, and slung between leafy branches, usually 5–15 m up. They typically lay two eggs.

=== Food and feeding ===
Green orioles forage slowly and methodically through the middle and upper strata of dense forests, taking fruit in the main. Typically alone or in pairs, they sometimes form small flocks in the nonbreeding season.
