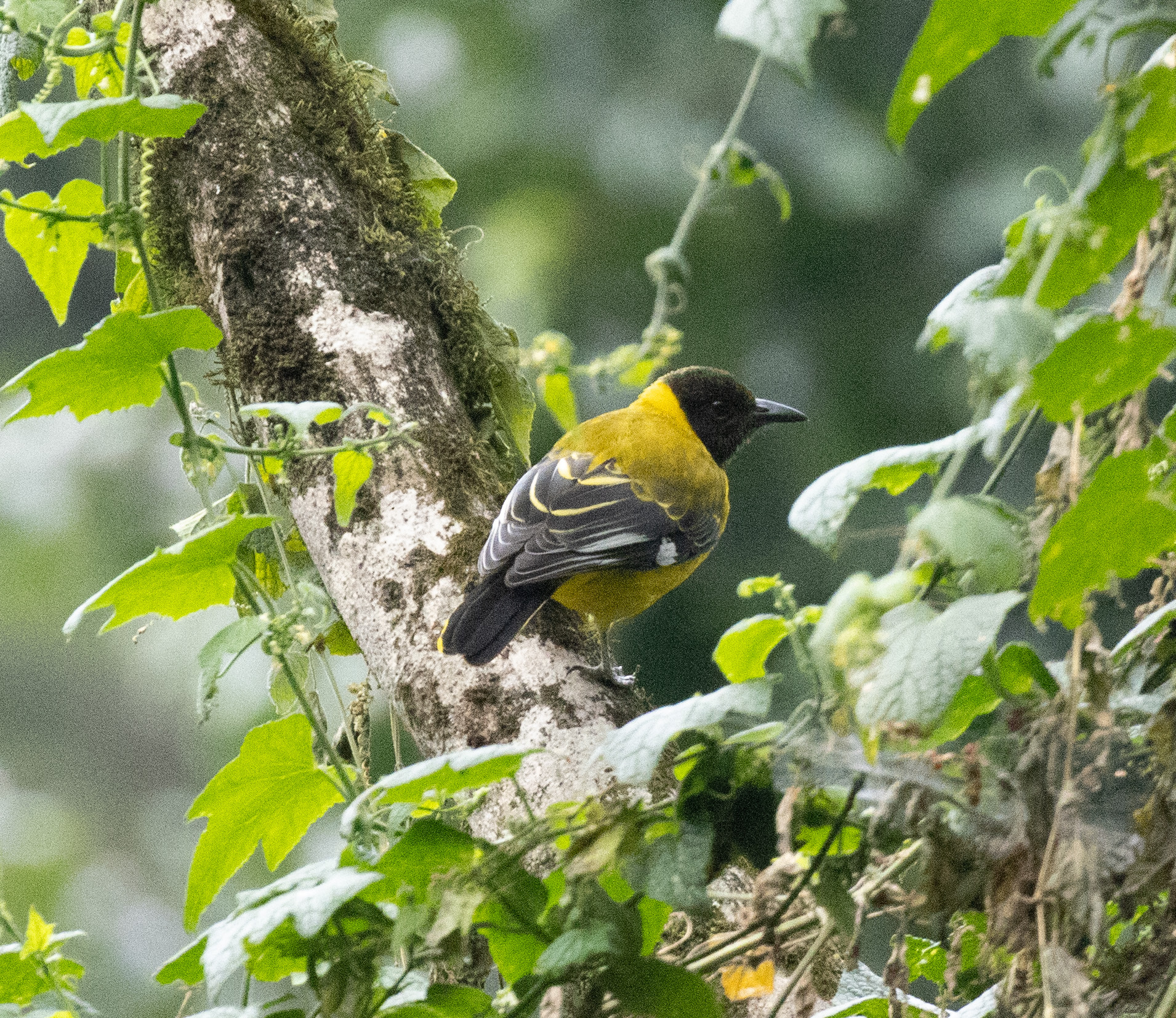

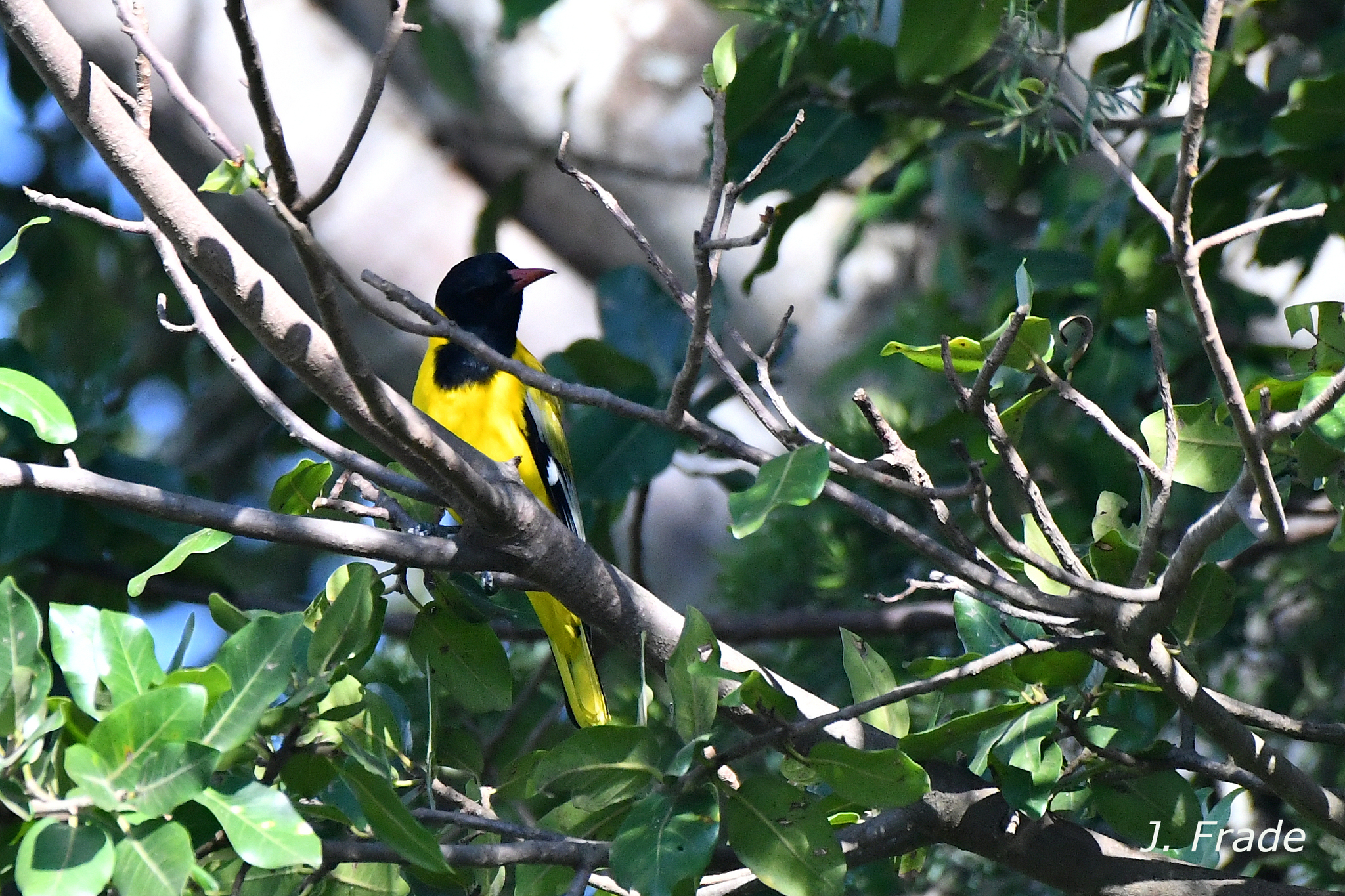

Conservation status
- Least Concern (IUCN 3.1)

Scientific classification
- Kingdom: Animalia
- Phylum: Chordata
- Class: Aves
- Order: Passeriformes
- Family: Oriolidae
- Genus: Oriolus
- Species: O. percivali

Binomial name
- Oriolus percivali Ogilvie-Grant, 1903

Synonyms
- Oriolus larvatus percivali; Oriolus nigripennis percivali

= Mountain oriole =

Species of bird

The mountain oriole (Oriolus percivali) is a bird species in the family Oriolidae. It is native to the Albertine Rift montane forests, Uganda and Kenya. Its natural habitats are subtropical or tropical moist montane forests.

== Taxonomy and systematics ==
The mountain oriole has been considered by some authorities to be a subspecies of the black-headed oriole or the black-winged oriole. Alternate names for the mountain oriole include the black-tailed oriole, montane oriole and Percival's oriole, the last name after Arthur Blayney Percival.
