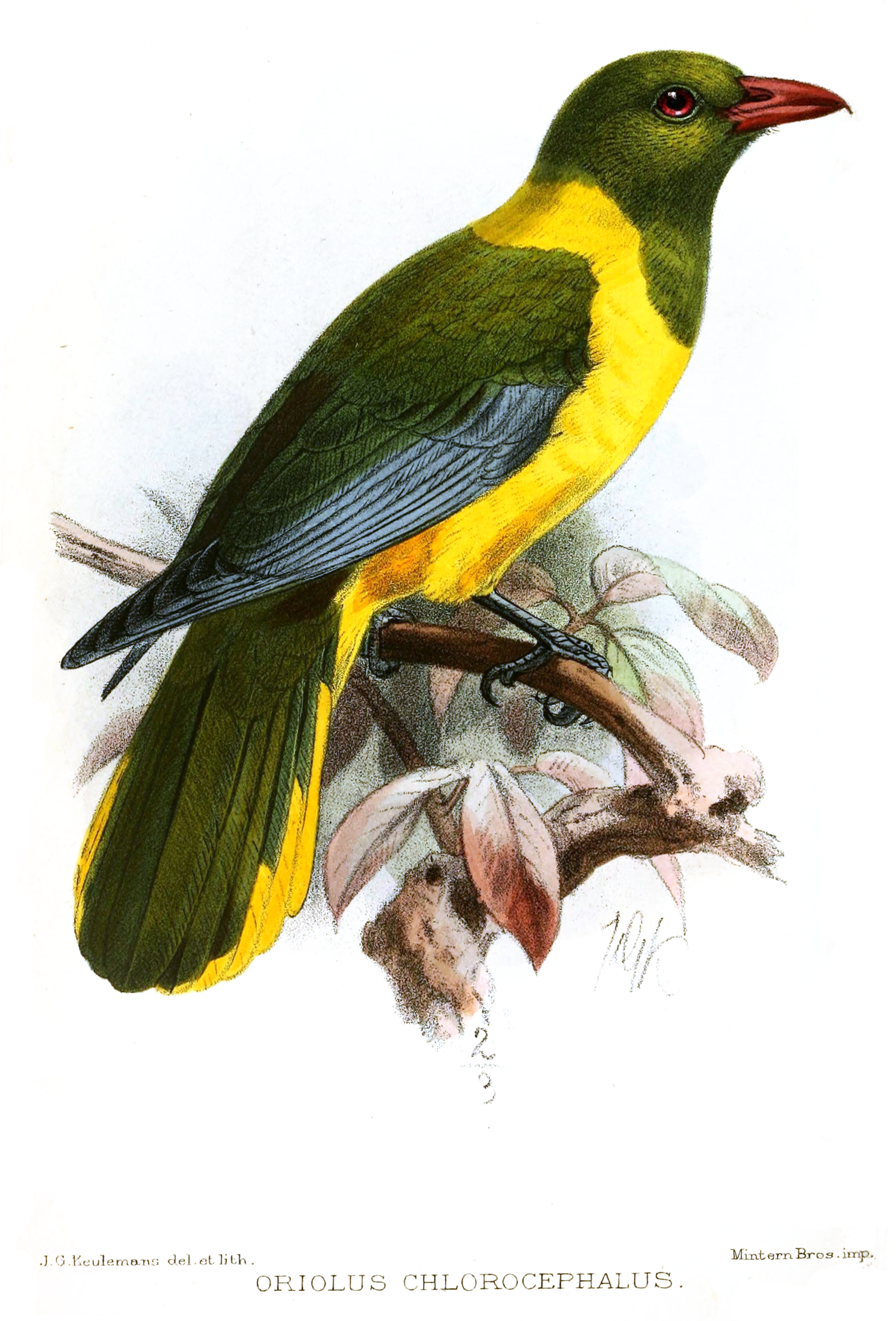

Conservation status
- Least Concern (IUCN 3.1)

Scientific classification
- Kingdom: Animalia
- Phylum: Chordata
- Class: Aves
- Order: Passeriformes
- Family: Oriolidae
- Genus: Oriolus
- Species: O. chlorocephalus

Binomial name
- Oriolus chlorocephalus Shelley, 1896

= Green-headed oriole =

Species of bird

The green-headed oriole (Oriolus chlorocephalus), or montane oriole, is a species of bird in the family Oriolidae. It is found in eastern Africa.

== Taxonomy and systematics ==
=== Subspecies ===
Three subspecies are recognized:

- O. c. amani - Benson, 1946: Found in south-eastern Kenya and eastern Tanzania
- O. c. chlorocephalus - Shelley, 1896: Found in Malawi and central Mozambique
- O. c. speculifer - Clancey, 1969: Found in southern Mozambique

== Distribution and habitat ==
Its natural habitats are subtropical or tropical, dry lowland forests and subtropical or tropical moist montane forests.

== Behaviour and ecology ==
They feed on fruit, seeds, nectar and insects or insect larvae.

== Gallery ==
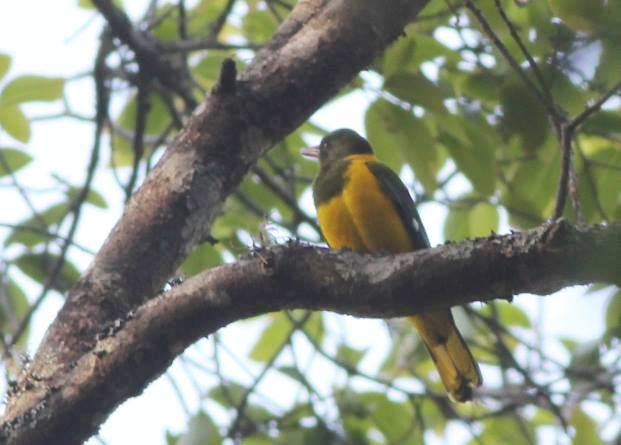
O. c. speculifer is endemic to Mount Gorongosa, Mozambique

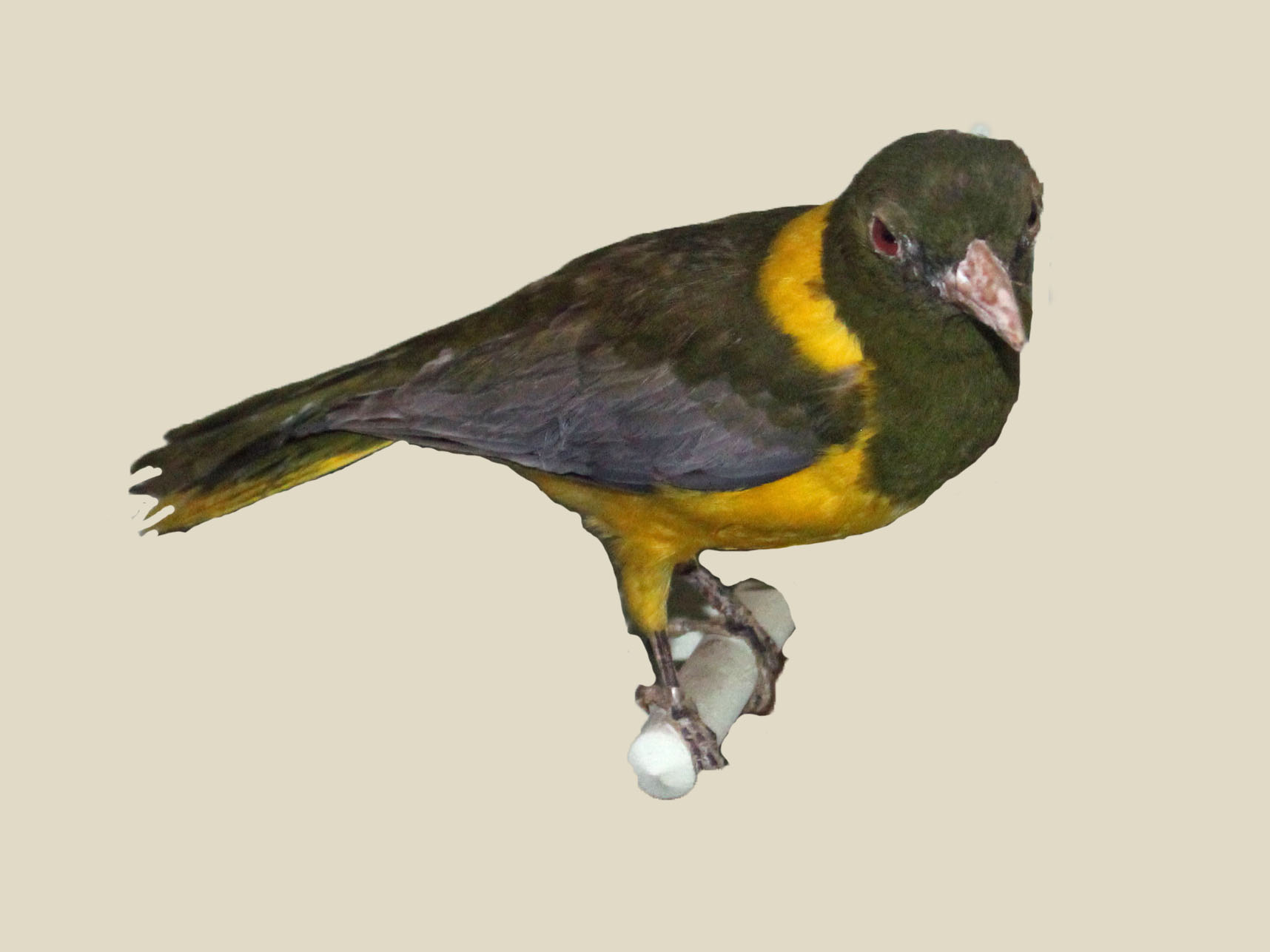
O. c. amani specimen at Nairobi National Museum
