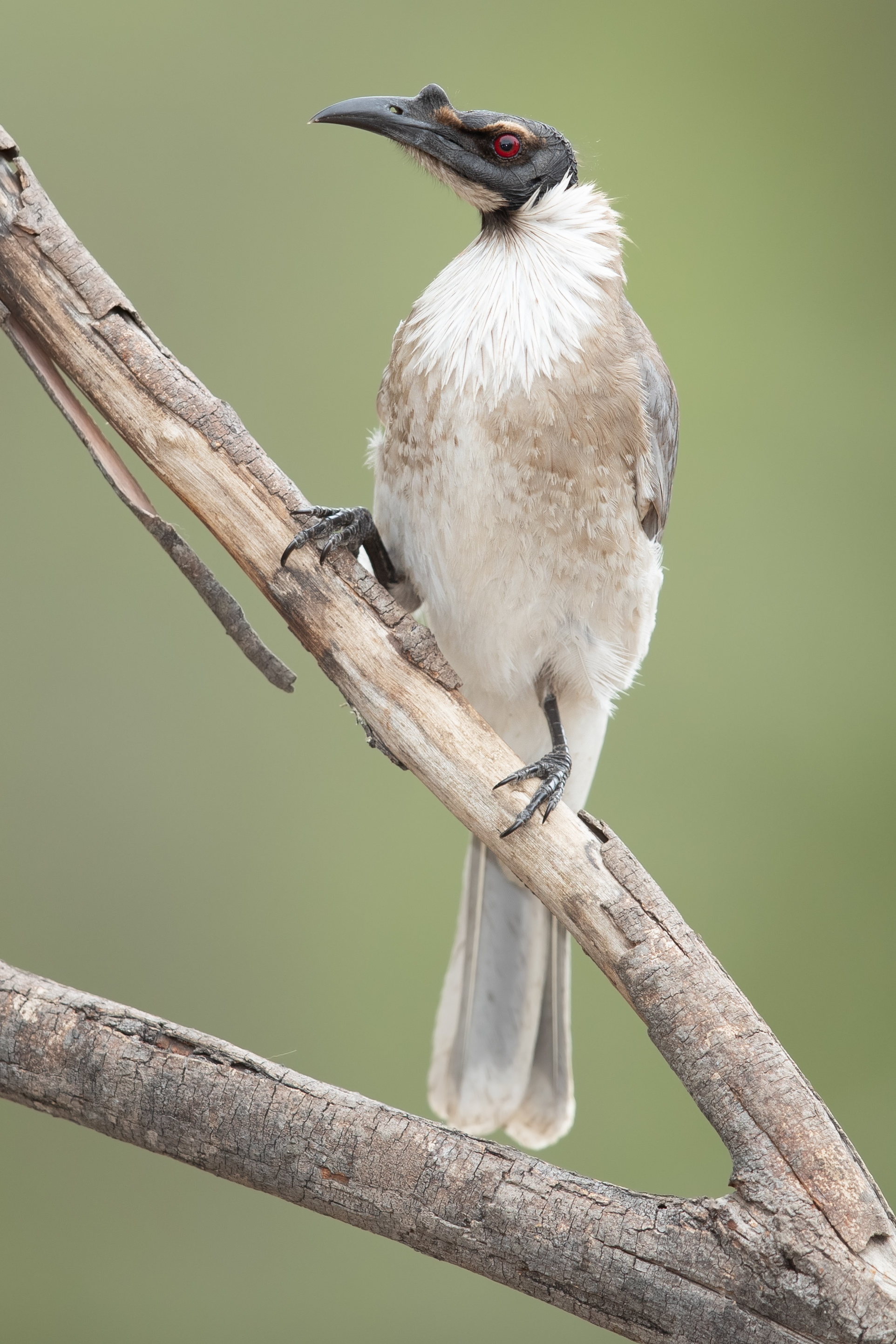

Conservation status
- Least Concern (IUCN 3.1)

Scientific classification
- Kingdom: Animalia
- Phylum: Chordata
- Class: Aves
- Order: Passeriformes
- Family: Meliphagidae
- Genus: Philemon
- Species: P. corniculatus

Binomial name
- Philemon corniculatus (Latham, 1790)
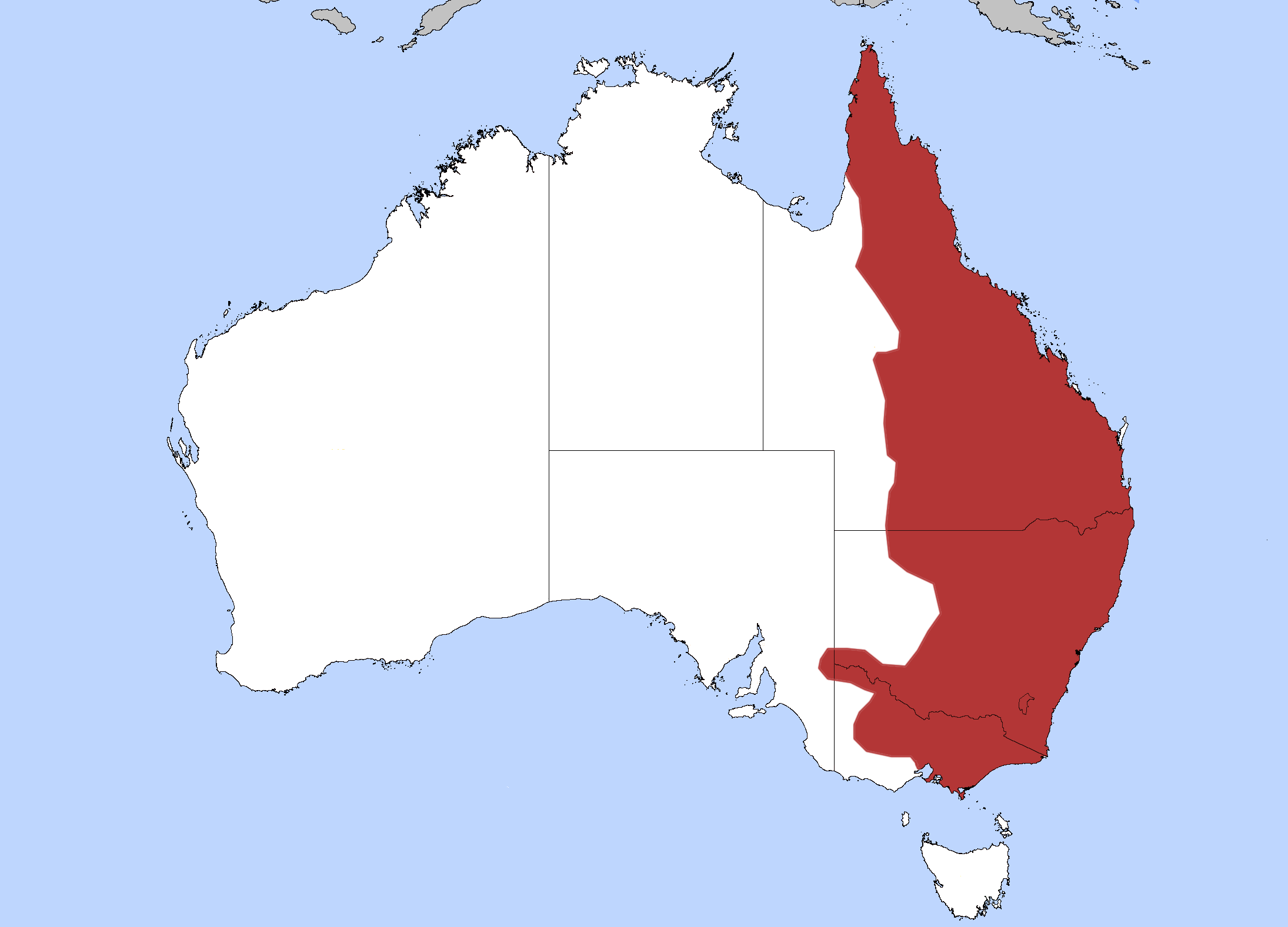
- Distribution of the noisy friarbird in Australia

= Noisy friarbird =

Species of bird

The noisy friarbird (Philemon corniculatus) is a passerine bird of the honeyeater family Meliphagidae native to southern New Guinea and eastern Australia. It is one of several species known as friarbirds whose heads are bare of feathers. It is brown-grey in colour, with a prominent knob on its bare black-skinned head. It feeds on insects and nectar.

== Taxonomy ==
The noisy friarbird was first described by ornithologist John Latham in 1790. The generic name is from the Ancient Greek philēmōn 'affectionate, kissing'. Its specific epithet is derived from the Latin corniculum '(having a) little horn'. It is sometimes known as a leatherhead. Wirgan was a name used by the local Eora and Darug inhabitants of the Sydney basin.

Molecular study shows its closest relative to be the silver-crowned friarbird within the genus Philemon. DNA analysis has shown honeyeaters to be related to the Pardalotidae (pardalotes), Acanthizidae (Australian warblers, scrubwrens, thornbills, etc.), and Maluridae (Australian fairy-wrens) in the large superfamily Meliphagoidea.

The Yuwaalaraay people of northern New South Wales use the name dhaguway to refer to this species.

== Description ==
Measuring 31–36 cm (12–14 in) in length, the noisy friarbird is a large honeyeater with dull brownish grey upperparts and paler brown-grey underparts. Its black head is completely bald apart from tufts of feathers under the chin and along the eyebrow. It can be distinguished by its rounded knob above the black bill, which is visible at distance. It has dark blue-black legs and red eyes.

As its name suggests, it is noisy; one of its calls has been likened to "four o'clock".

== Distribution and habitat ==
The natural range is from the vicinity of Lakes Entrance and the Murray valley in Victoria, north through New South Wales and Queensland to Cape York. In New Guinea, it is restricted to the Trans-Fly in the south of the island where it is locally abundant.

== Behaviour ==
In southern parts of eastern Australia the species is migratory, moving north to overwinter and returning south in the spring. Large aggregations of noisy friarbirds are possible, often in association with little friarbirds. At such times, the constant cackling and chattering of the noisy friarbird can fill the forest with sound. The calls are used to identify an individual's feeding territory, and also announce the presence of food sources worth defending to other birds—not necessarily friarbirds alone. Their diet consists of nectar, insects, and fruit. The consumption of commercially grown fruit, such as grapes and berries, can bring noisy friarbirds into direct conflict with humans who may regard them as pests under those circumstances. They are aggressively protective of their nests, and are known to swoop.

=== Breeding ===
Breeding may occur from July to January, with one or two broods during this time. The nest is a large, deep cup with an inverted lip or rim, made of bark and grass hanging from a horizontal branch, 1–3 metres above the ground, and usually well-hidden. Two to four (rarely five) eggs are laid, measuring 22 by 33 millimetres (0.87 in × 1.30 in), and buff- to pale-pink splotched with darker pink-brown or purplish colours.

== Gallery ==
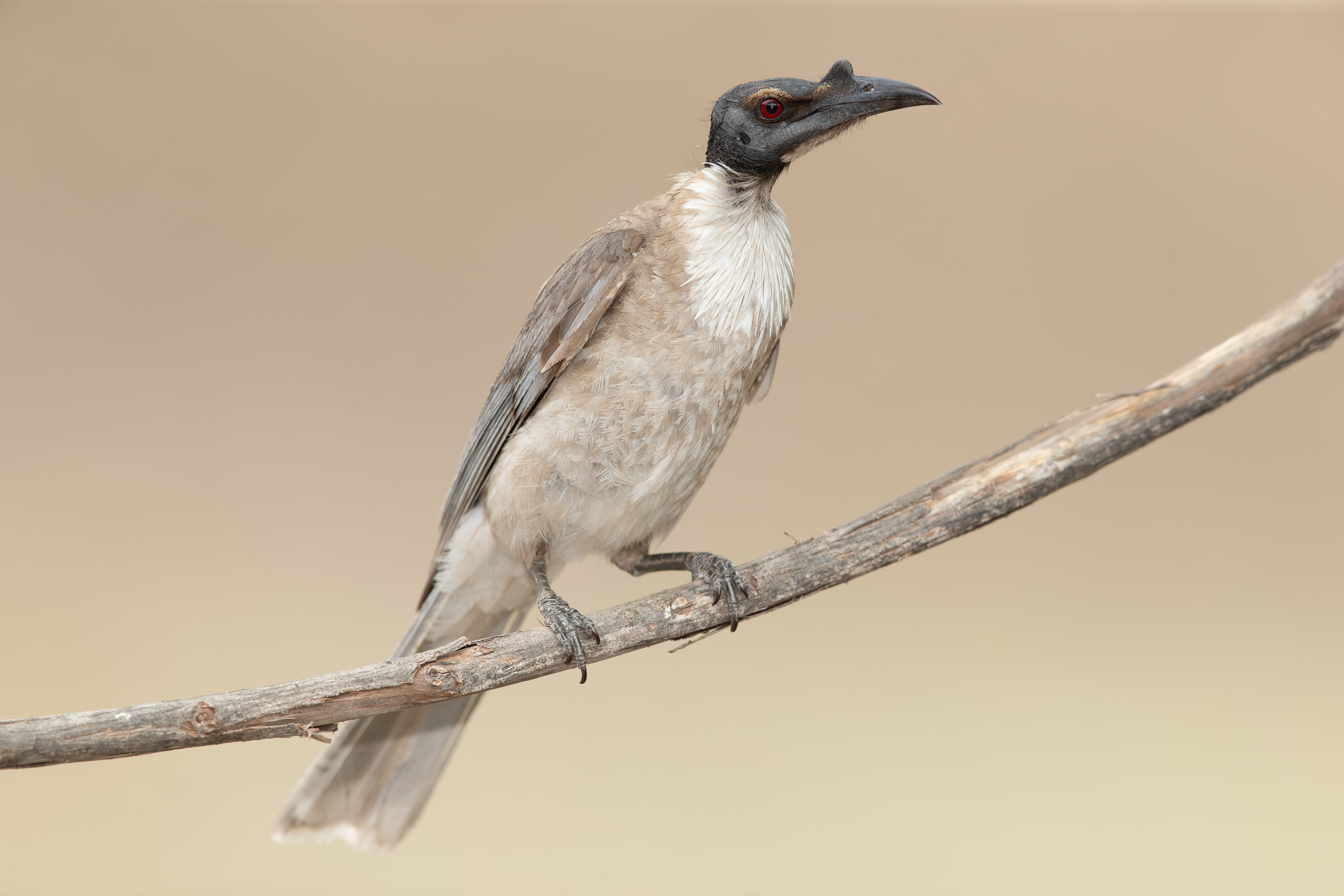
Adult in New South Wales

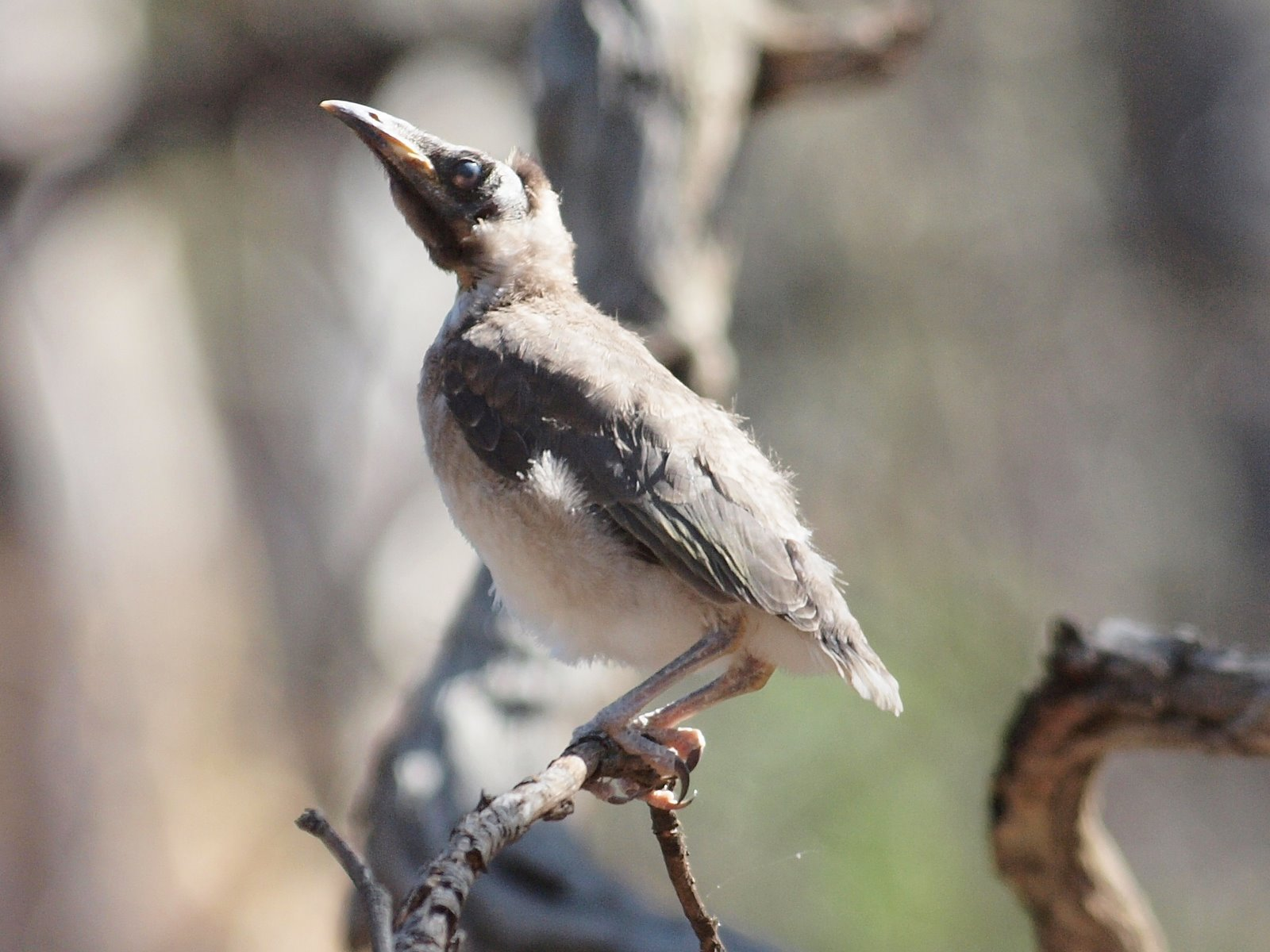
Juvenile in Canberra, Australia

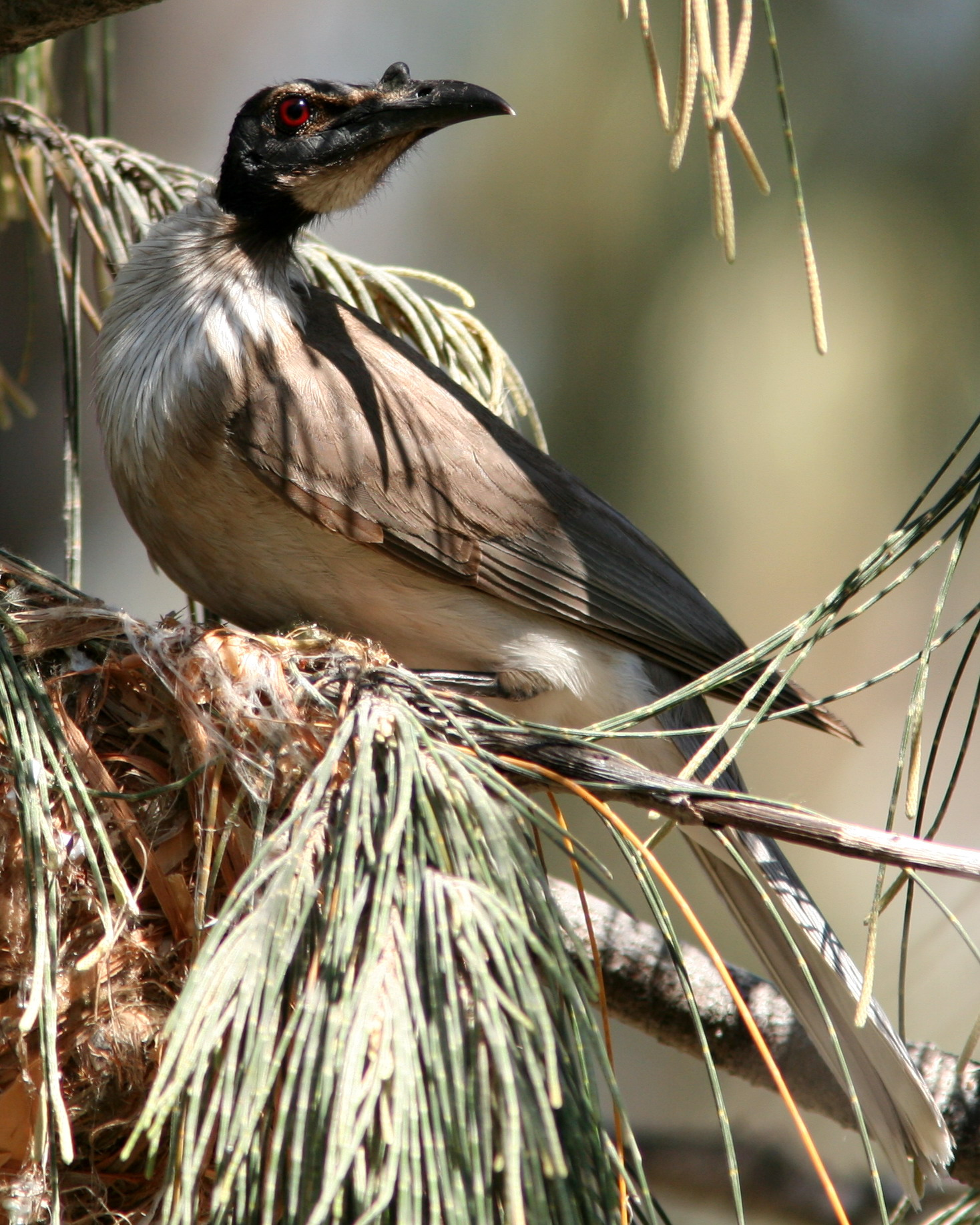
Adult by nest

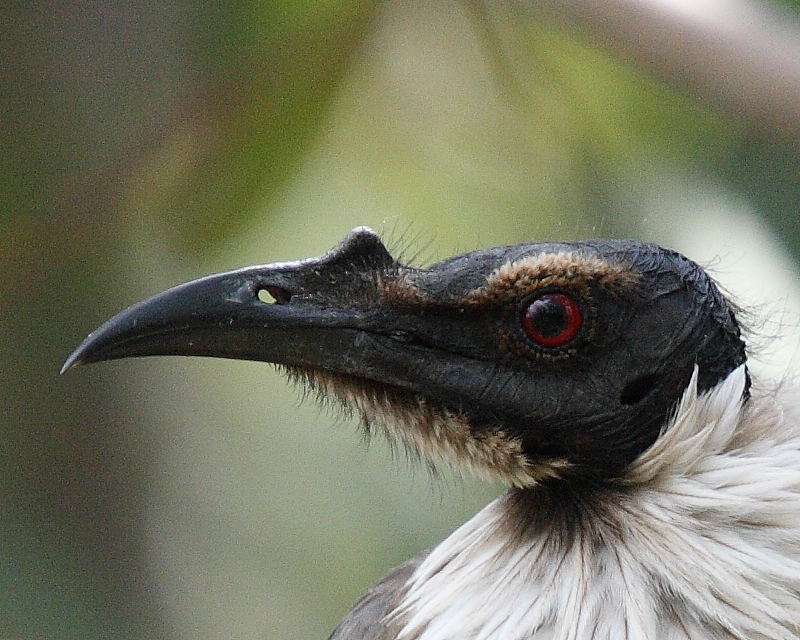
Head
