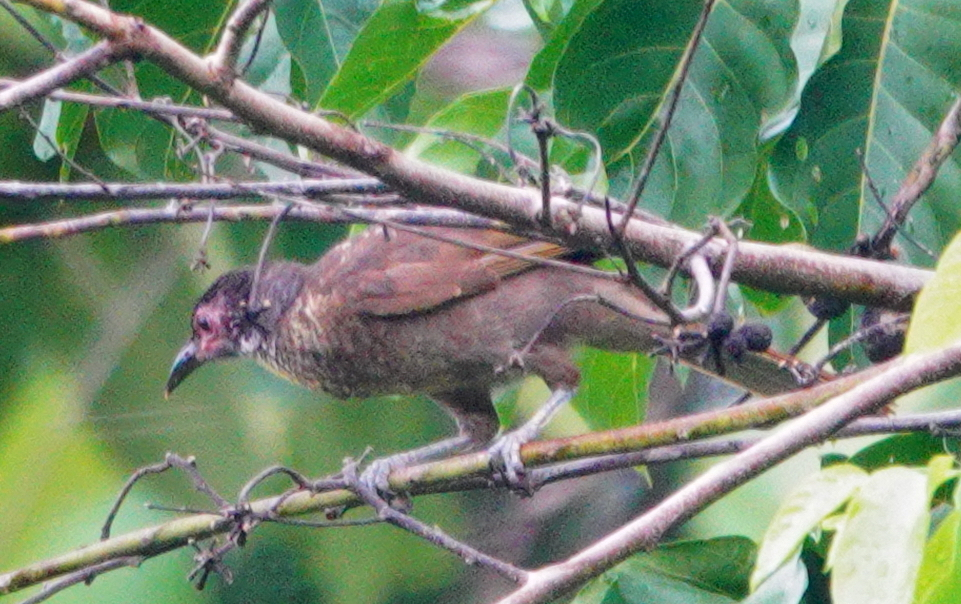

Conservation status
- Near Threatened (IUCN 3.1)

Scientific classification
- Kingdom: Animalia
- Phylum: Chordata
- Class: Aves
- Order: Passeriformes
- Family: Meliphagidae
- Genus: Philemon
- Species: P. fuscicapillus

Binomial name
- Philemon fuscicapillus (Wallace, 1862)

= Morotai friarbird =

Species of bird

The Morotai friarbird or dusky friarbird (Philemon fuscicapillus) is a species of friarbird in the honeyeater family Meliphagidae. It is a dark brown bird with pale undersides. The area around the eye is bare and pink. It is around 30 cm long. The species is mimicked by the dusky-brown oriole, which is almost identical in appearance, a situation that has arisen in many species of orioles and friarbirds that exist in the same habitat. This is thought to reduce aggression by the friarbirds against the smaller orioles. It is endemic to the island of Morotai (there are also unproven records on Bacan) in North Maluku, Indonesia.

Its natural habitat is tropical moist lowland forests and tropical moist shrubland. The species is tolerant of habitat degradation and has been observed living in coconut plantations. It is probably threatened by habitat loss, as much of the remaining forest in its range is threatened with logging, but more research is needed.
