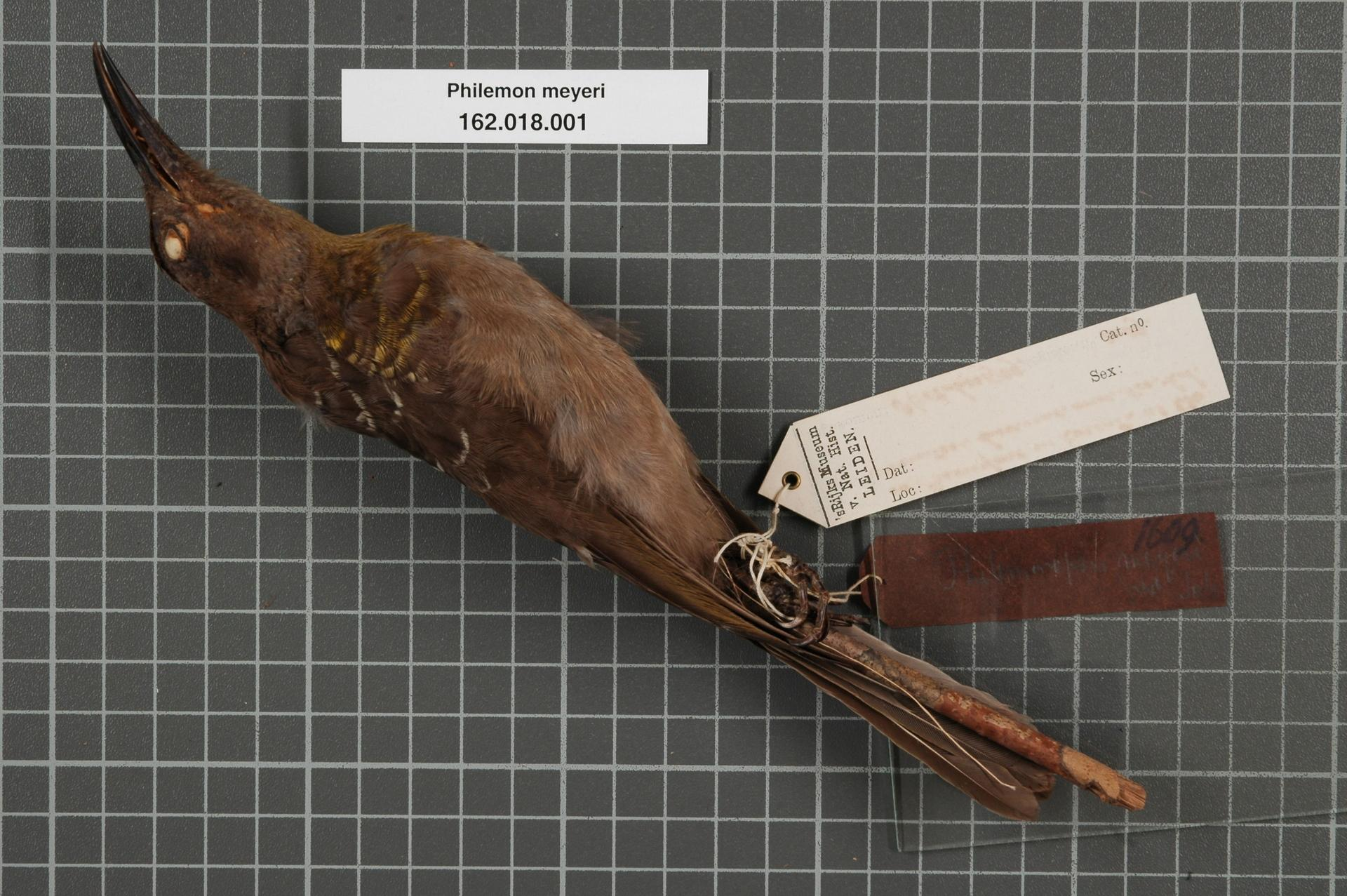

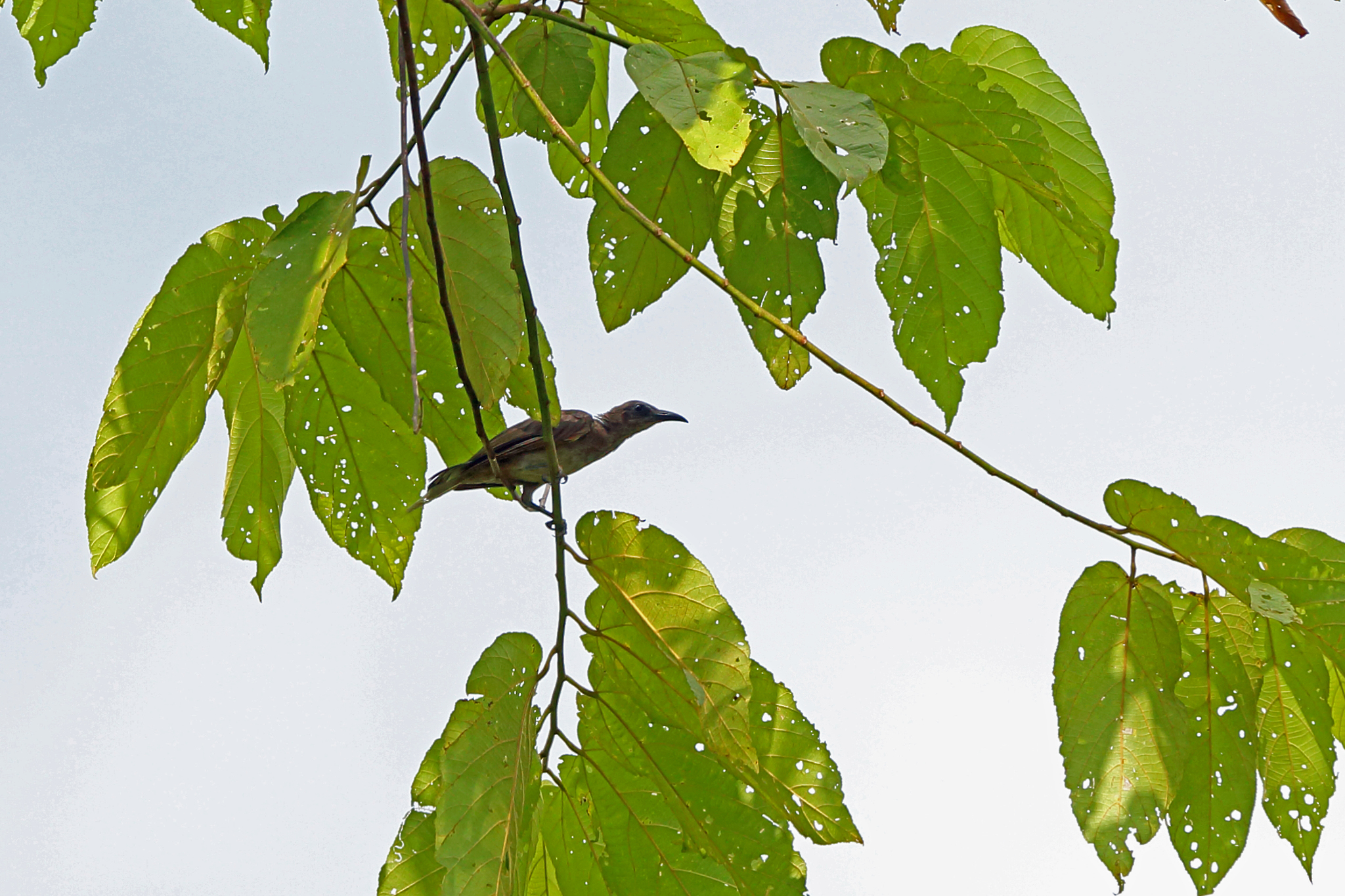

Conservation status
- Least Concern (IUCN 3.1)

Scientific classification
- Kingdom: Animalia
- Phylum: Chordata
- Class: Aves
- Order: Passeriformes
- Family: Meliphagidae
- Genus: Philemon
- Species: P. meyeri

Binomial name
- Philemon meyeri Salvadori, 1878

= Meyer's friarbird =

Species of bird

Meyer's friarbird (Philemon meyeri) is a species of bird in the family Meliphagidae. It is found throughout New Guinea. Its natural habitat is subtropical or tropical moist lowland forests.

The common name commemorates Adolf Bernard Meyer (1840–1911), a German anthropologist and ornithologist who collected in the Dutch East Indies.
