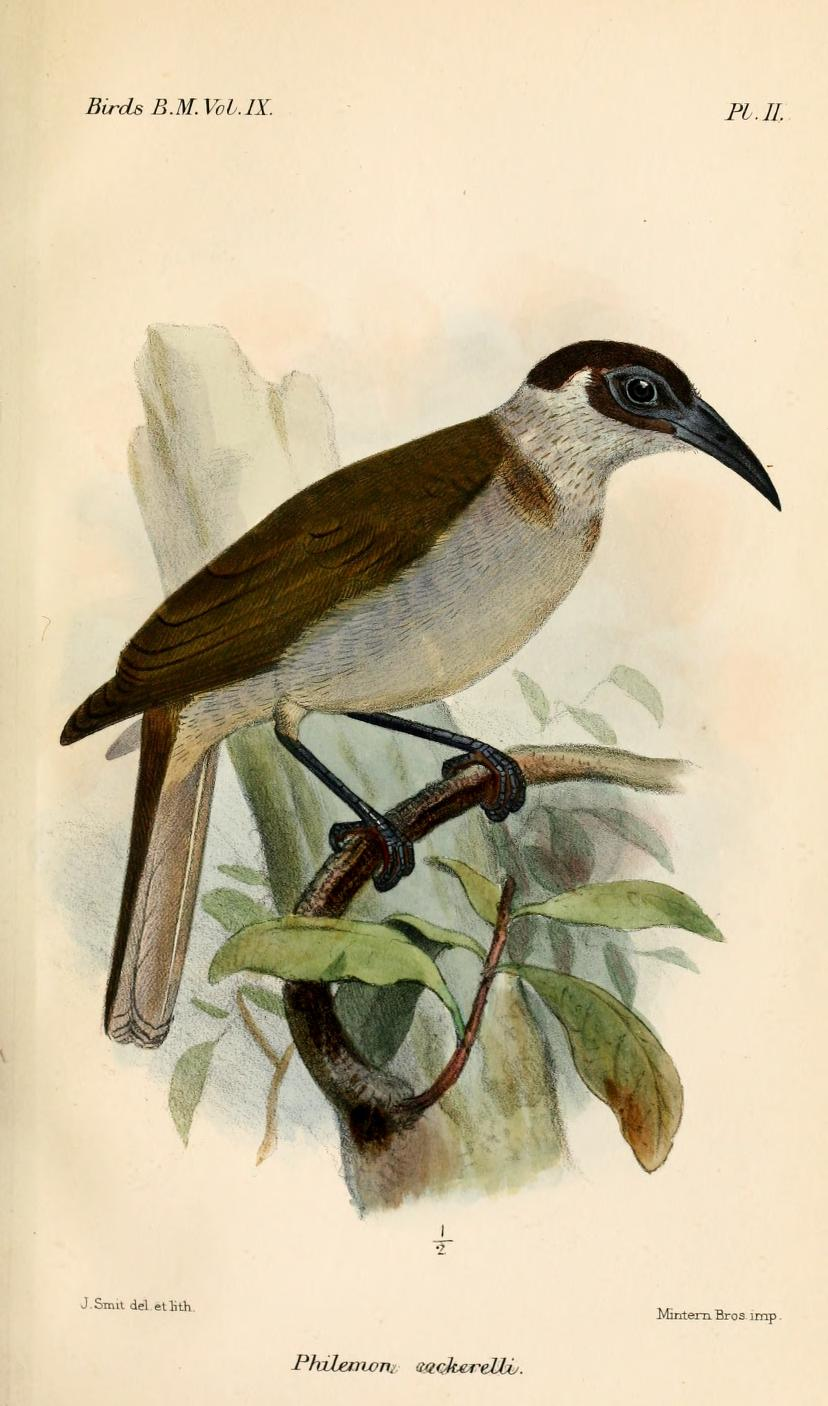

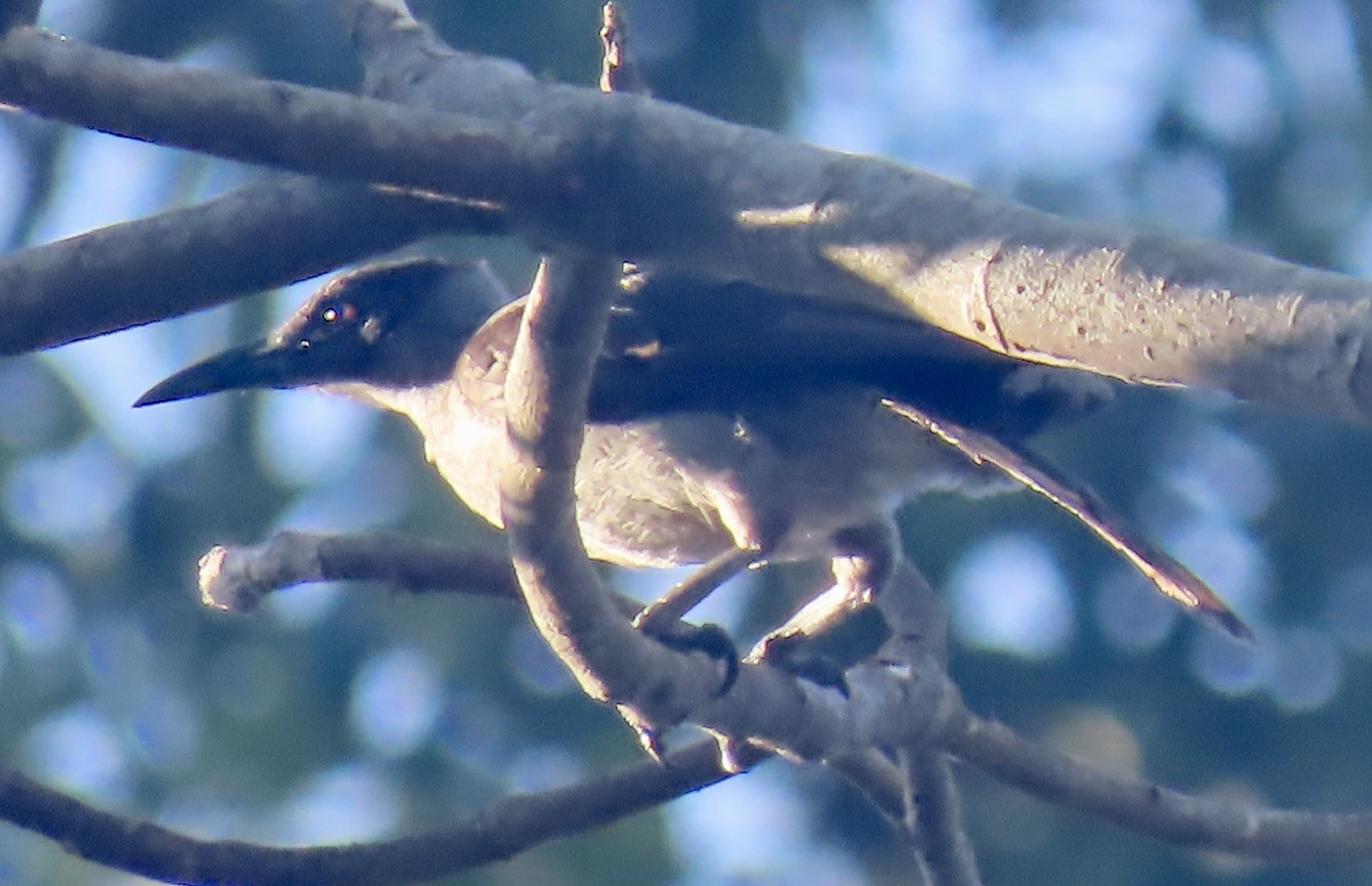

Conservation status
- Least Concern (IUCN 3.1)

Scientific classification
- Kingdom: Animalia
- Phylum: Chordata
- Class: Aves
- Order: Passeriformes
- Family: Meliphagidae
- Genus: Philemon
- Species: P. cockerelli

Binomial name
- Philemon cockerelli Sclater, PL, 1877

= New Britain friarbird =

Species of bird

The New Britain friarbird (Philemon cockerelli) is a species of bird in the family Meliphagidae. It is endemic to Papua New Guinea.

Its natural habitats are subtropical or tropical moist lowland forests and subtropical or tropical moist montane forests.
