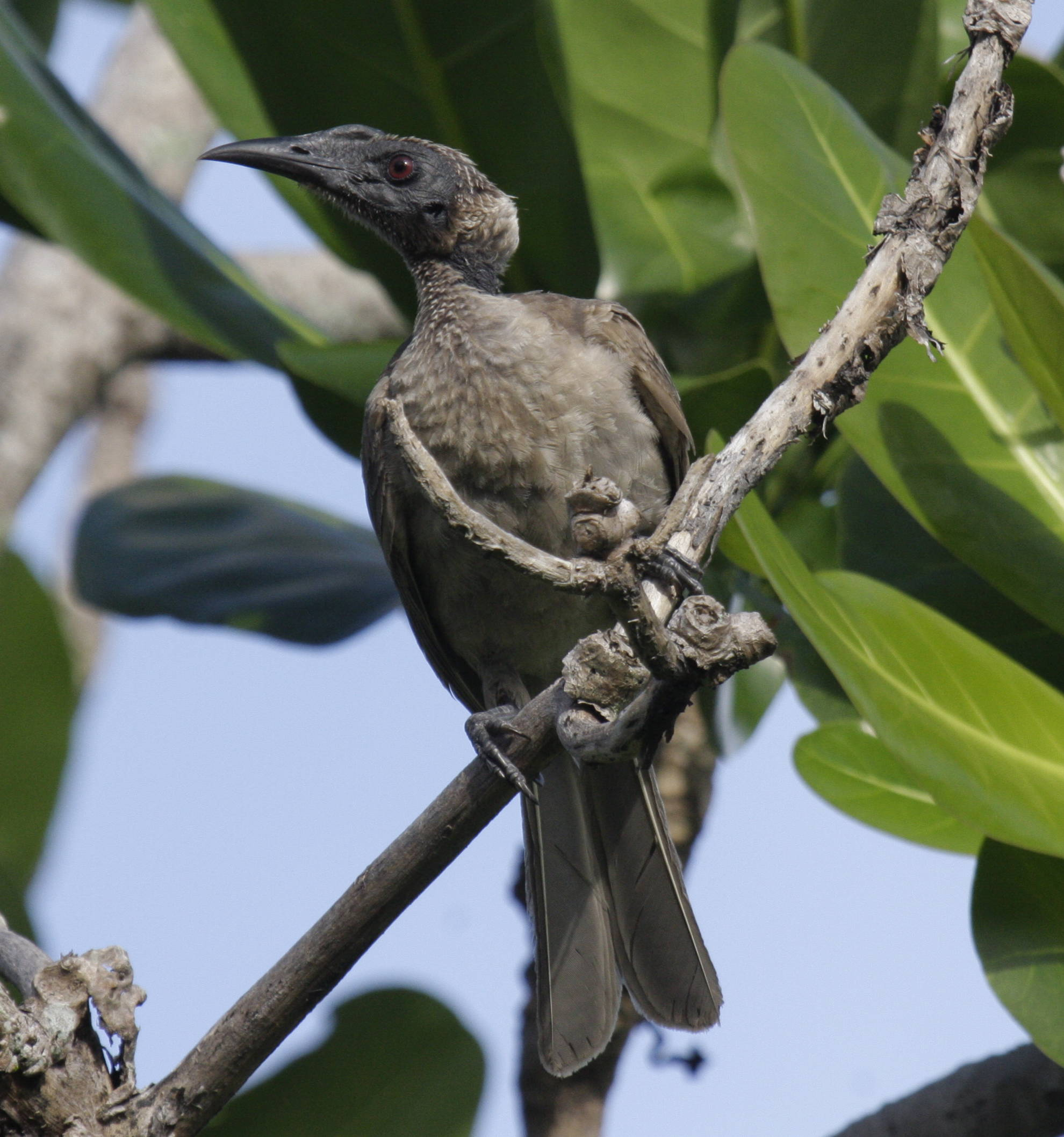

Conservation status
- Least Concern (IUCN 3.1)

Scientific classification
- Kingdom: Animalia
- Phylum: Chordata
- Class: Aves
- Order: Passeriformes
- Family: Meliphagidae
- Genus: Philemon
- Species: P. buceroides

Binomial name
- Philemon buceroides (Swainson, 1838)

= Helmeted friarbird =

Species of bird

The helmeted friarbird (Philemon buceroides) is part of the Meliphagidae family. The helmeted friarbird, along with all their subspecies, is commonly referred to as "leatherhead" by the birding community.

== Taxonomy ==
The helmeted friarbird was formally described in 1838 by the English zoologist William Swainson under the binomial name Philedon buceroides. The specific epithet combines the genus Buceros that was introduced in 1758 by Carl Linnaeus for the hornbills with the Ancient Greek -οιδης/-oidēs meaning "resembling". Swainson believed that his specimen had come from Australia (New Holland) but this was an error and in 1916 the Austrian ornithologist Carl Eduard Hellmayr designated the island of Timor as the type locality. The helmeted friarbird is now one of 17 friarbirds placed in the genus Philemon that was introduced in 1816 by the French ornithologist Louis Pierre Vieillot.

Ten subspecies are recognised:

- P. b. jobiensis (Meyer, AB, 1874) – Yapen (Geelvink Bay islands, northwest New Guinea) and north New Guinea
- P. b. novaeguineae (Müller, S, 1842) – Raja Ampat Islands (northwest of New Guinea), Bird south Head (northwest New Guinea) and south, southeast New Guinea (New Guinea friarbird)
- P. b. aruensis (Meyer, AB, 1884) – Aru Islands (southwest of New Guinea)
- P. b. subtuberosus Hartert, EJO, 1896 – D'Entrecasteaux Archipelago and Trobriand Islands (east of southeast New Guinea)
- P. b. tagulanus Rothschild & Hartert, EJO, 1918 – Tagula Island (central Louisiade Archipelago, east of southeast New Guinea)
- P. b. neglectus (Büttikofer, 1891) – Lombok to Sumba and Flores (west, central Lesser Sunda Islands)
- P. b. buceroides (Swainson, 1838) – Sawu to Timor and Wetar (east Lesser Sunda Islands)
- P. b. yorki Mathews, 1912 – northeast Australia (hornbill friarbird)
- P. b. gordoni Mathews, 1912 – coastal Top End, north Northern Territory and Melville I. (Tiwi Islands, north of Northern Territory; far central north Australia)
- P. b. ammitophilus Schodde & Mason, IJ & McKean, 1979 – interior Top End, north Northern Territory (central north Australia)

The subspecies P. b. novaeguineae and P. b. yorki have sometimes been considered as separate species, as the New Guinea friarbird and the hornbill friarbird respectively.

== Description ==
The helmeted friarbird has a dark gray face with red eyes. This bird is a gray-brown bird with a fading white as it comes toward the chest. As the spotted chest approaches the feet, it starts to tint darker until it gets to the feet. The bird ranges from 32 to 36 centimeters weighing in at 127-179g for males and 92-112g for females. The average male measures about 38 cm, and is the largest subspecies of the 4 helmeted friarbirds found in Australia.

== Distribution and habitat ==
The helmeted friarbird is most prominently abundant in the Northern Territory coasts of Australia and Indonesia. The specific habitat of the friarbird varies based on the subspecies; however, they are mainly found in subtropical or tropical dry forests, lowland forests, and mangrove forests. While building nests, the friarbirds typically use bark, leaves and stems to create a sturdy structure. They will also use sticks for extra support and grass for comfort. They tend to build their nests close to a body of water and high in trees to avoid harm.

== Behaviour ==
The helmeted friarbird is very vocal with loud "squawks" that can be heard from afar. They are known for sounding like keeyo-keoway or kowee ko keeyo which can be repeated up to a dozen times. In addition, they also vocalize kurr-rk frequently which they slowly repeat from eight to ten times. The friarbird typically is more vocal in the morning and during storms and is quiet throughout the rest of the time. There are only slim differences between the male and female as well.

=== Breeding ===
Breeding for the helmeted friarbird most commonly happens throughout the months of September to February, occasionally throughout the months of February to May and October to December, but never in the months of May and July.

While breeding the helmeted friarbird typically lays 2-4 eggs at a time; however, they can lay up to 5 at a time. The incubation period only takes 15-18 days.

The lifespan of a helmeted friarbird is roughly 5-7 years. The helmeted friarbird's population has currently been evaluated as stable; however, it is suspected that within the next 10 years the population will decrease by 10%, therefore ultimately classifying the species as vulnerable.

The friarbird is quickly becoming closer to extinction with a decrease of ten percent after every generation. With the average lifespan only being five to seven years, this species is in danger. Unfortunately, the current population is unknown but we do know that it is declining by that ten percent.

=== Food and feeding ===
The helmeted friarbird eats a variety of food. The main source of their nutrients includes nectar, fruits and seeds. Occasionally, they will eat invertebrates, and on a rare occasion they will eat lizards; however, the basics of their diet vary according to their location. They will often congregate in feeding parties of 10 to 30 around flowering trees and shrubs.
