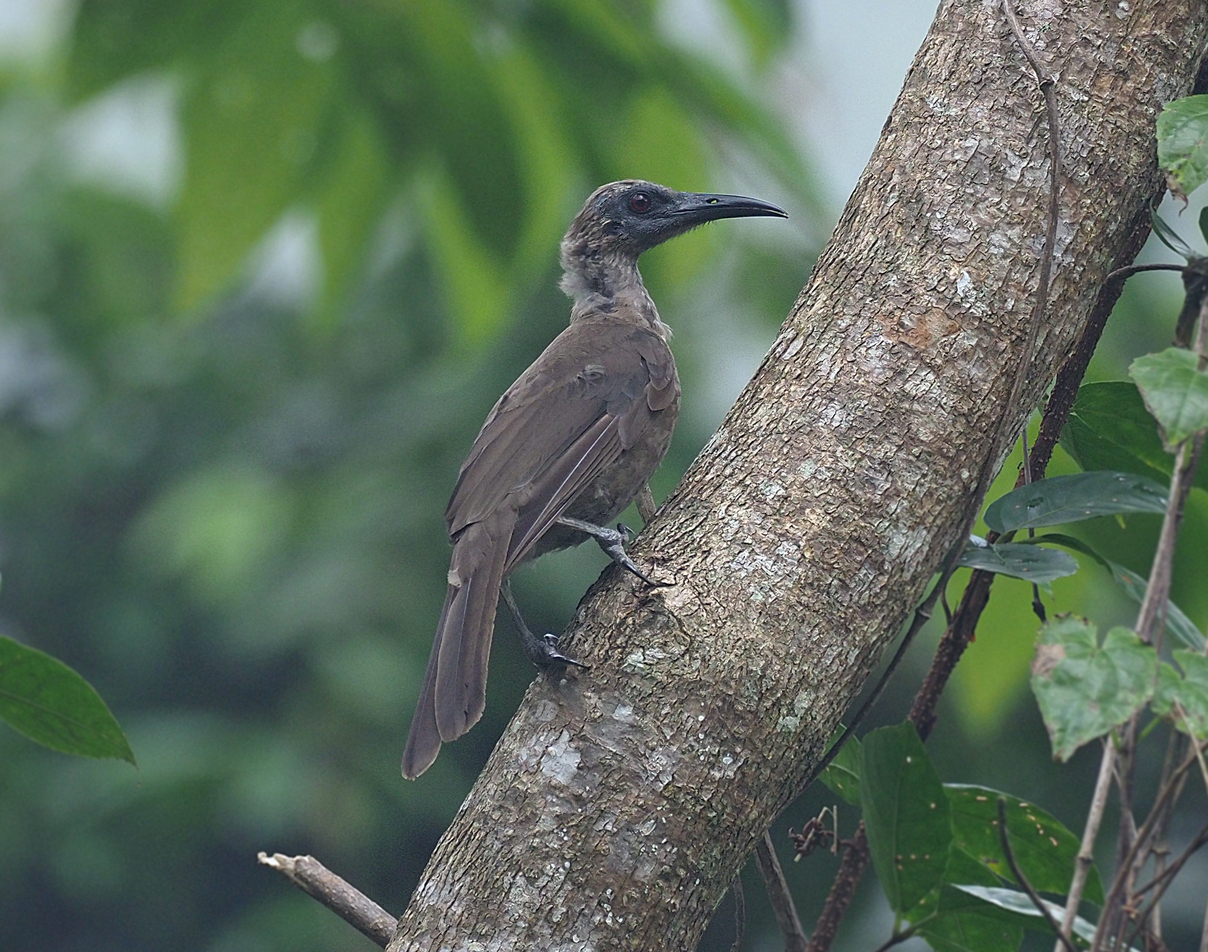

Conservation status
- Least Concern (IUCN 3.1)

Scientific classification
- Kingdom: Animalia
- Phylum: Chordata
- Class: Aves
- Order: Passeriformes
- Family: Meliphagidae
- Genus: Philemon
- Species: P. moluccensis

Binomial name
- Philemon moluccensis (Gmelin, JF, 1788)
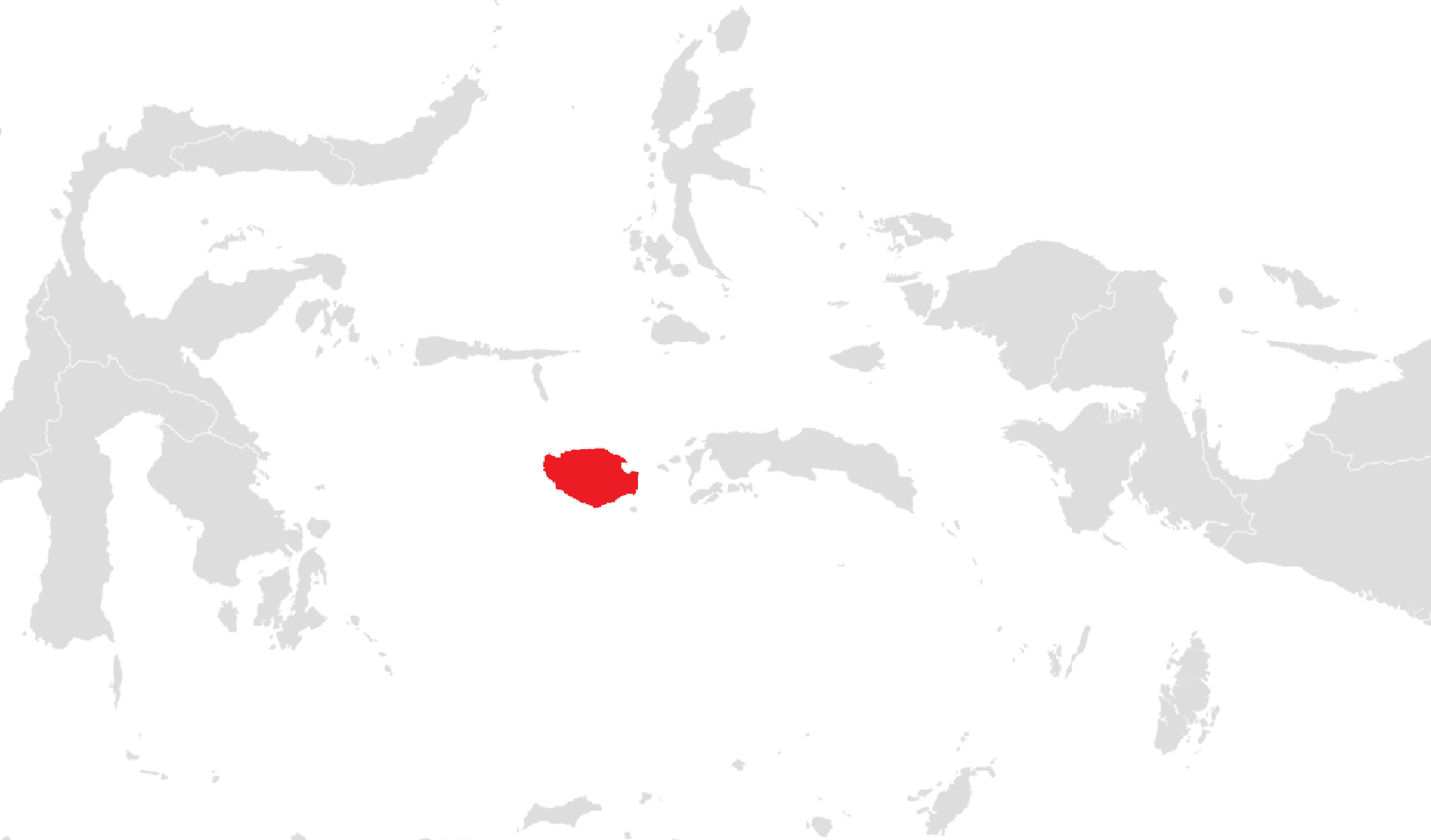

= Buru friarbird =

Species of bird

The Buru friarbird or black-faced friarbird (Philemon moluccensis) is a species of bird in the family Meliphagidae. It is endemic to the island of Buru in the Maluku Islands, Indonesia.

Its natural habitats are subtropical or tropical moist lowland forests and subtropical or tropical moist montane forests.

== Taxonomy ==
The Buru friarbird was formally described in 1788 by the German naturalist Johann Friedrich Gmelin in his revised and expanded edition of Carl Linnaeus's Systema Naturae. He placed it with the bee-eaters in the genus Merops and coined the binomial name Merops moluccensis. Gmelin based his description on "Le Polochion" that had been described by the French polymath Comte de Buffon in 1779 and the "Moluccan bee-eater" that had been described by the English ornithologist John Latham in 1782. Latham had examined a specimen belonging to the Leverian Museum in London. The Buru friarbird is now one of 18 honeyeaters placed in the genus Philemon that was introduced in 1816 by the French ornithologist Louis Pierre Vieillot. The species is monotypic: no subspecies are recognised.

The Buru friarbird was formerly considered to be conspecific with the Tanimbar friarbird (Philemon plumigenis) with the common name "black-faced friarbird". The Buru friarbird is more similar in appearance to the Seram friarbird (Philemon subcorniculatus) than it is to the Tanimbar friarbird.
