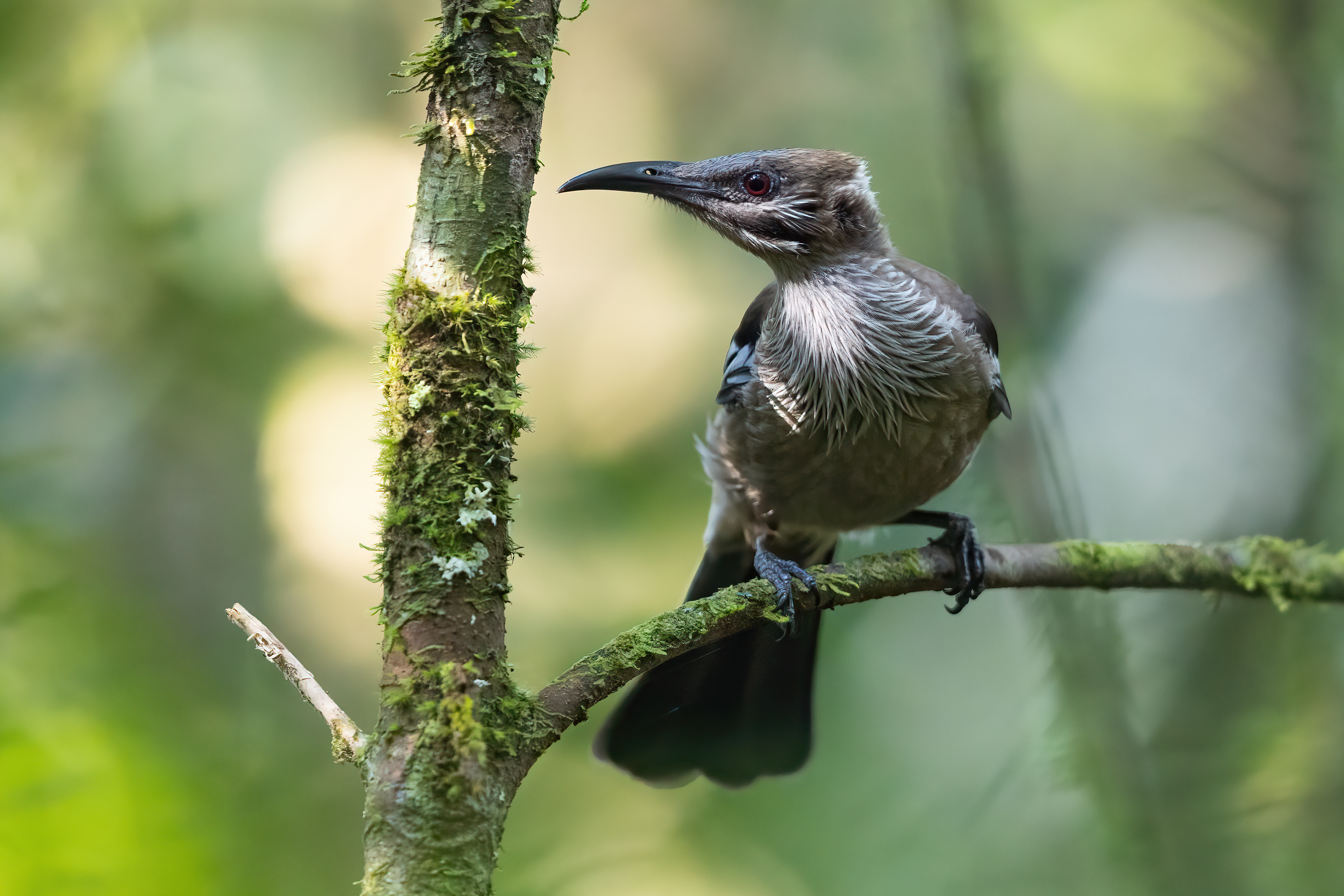

Conservation status
- Least Concern (IUCN 3.1)

Scientific classification
- Kingdom: Animalia
- Phylum: Chordata
- Class: Aves
- Order: Passeriformes
- Family: Meliphagidae
- Genus: Philemon
- Species: P. diemenensis

Binomial name
- Philemon diemenensis (Lesson, 1831)

= New Caledonian friarbird =

Species of bird

The New Caledonian friarbird (Philemon diemenensis) is a species of bird in the honeyeater family Meliphagidae.

The New Caledonian friarbird is a large honeyeater, measuring 27 to 32 cm (11–13 in). Males are slightly heavier than females on average, 69–84 g (2.4–3.0 oz) in contrast to 53–62 g (1.9–2.2 oz).

The New Caledonian friarbird is endemic to New Caledonia, where it is found on Grande Terre, Île des Pins and the Loyalty Islands. On these islands it is found in native forests and open country, and will also frequent disturbed habitat and human modified habitats such as gardens.

The diet of the New Caledonian friarbird is composed of nectar, insects and fruits. Insects may be taken on the wing, and larger prey items brought back to a branch to be battered before eating. Like other honeyeaters, it is an aggressive and bold species that will chase other species of birds including birds of prey, parrots and crows. Little is known about their breeding behavior. Their breeding season is from October to December, during which two eggs are laid into a cup nest made of sticks and leaves.
