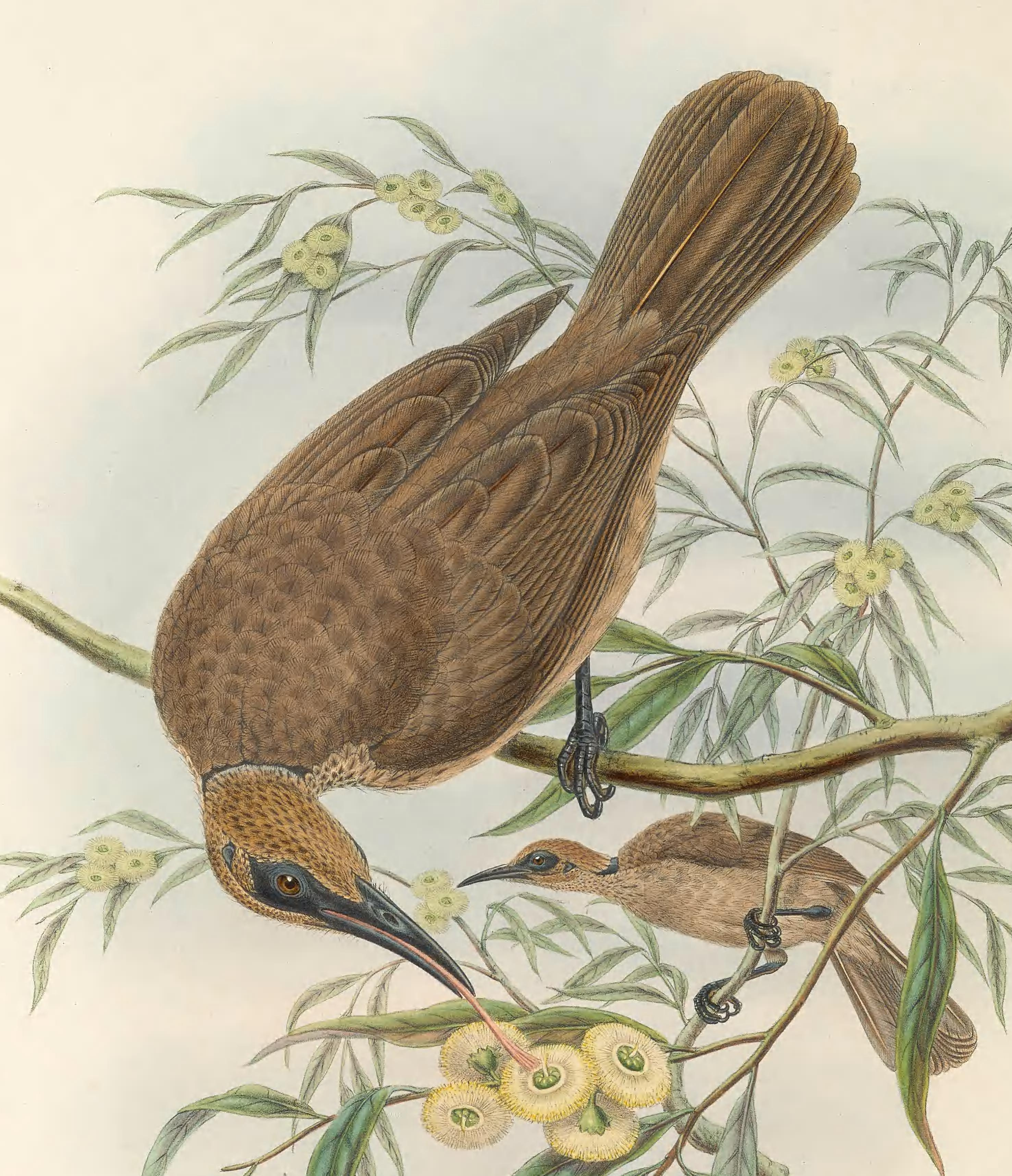

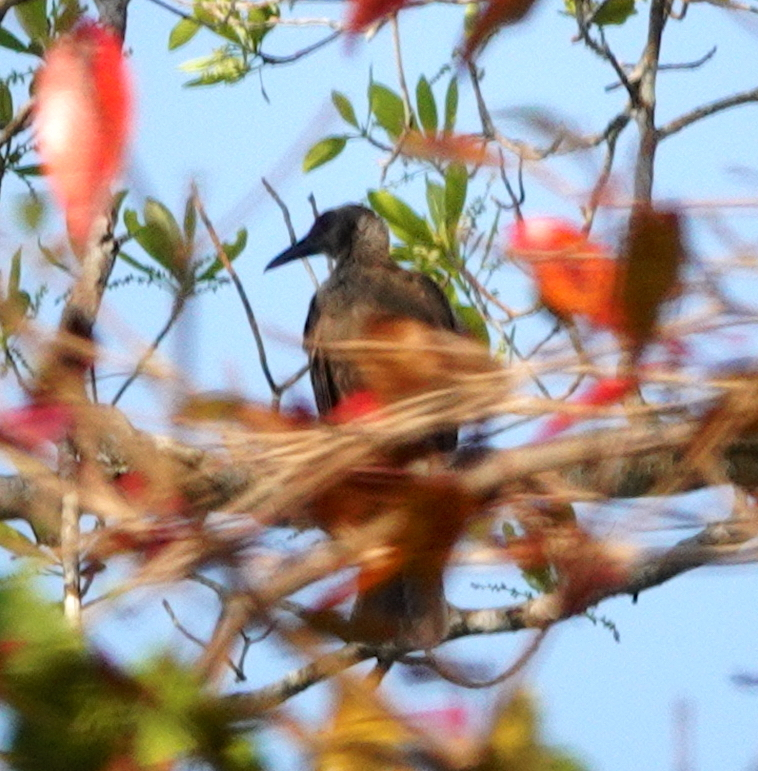

Conservation status
- Least Concern (IUCN 3.1)

Scientific classification
- Kingdom: Animalia
- Phylum: Chordata
- Class: Aves
- Order: Passeriformes
- Family: Meliphagidae
- Genus: Philemon
- Species: P. plumigenis

Binomial name
- Philemon plumigenis (GR Gray, 1858)

= Tanimbar friarbird =

Species of bird

The Tanimbar friarbird (Philemon plumigenis) is a species of bird in the family Meliphagidae. It is endemic to the Kai and Tanimbar Islands, Indonesia.

Its natural habitats are subtropical or tropical moist lowland forests and subtropical or tropical moist montane forests.

It was first described by the English ornithologist George Robert Gray in 1858 under the binomial name Tropidorhynchus plumigenis. The specific epithet is from the Latin pluma meaning plume and genis meaning cheeks.

The Tanimbar friarbird was split from the Buru friarbird that occurs on the island of Buru following the publication in 2007 of a study by Frank Rheindt and Robert Hutchinson.
