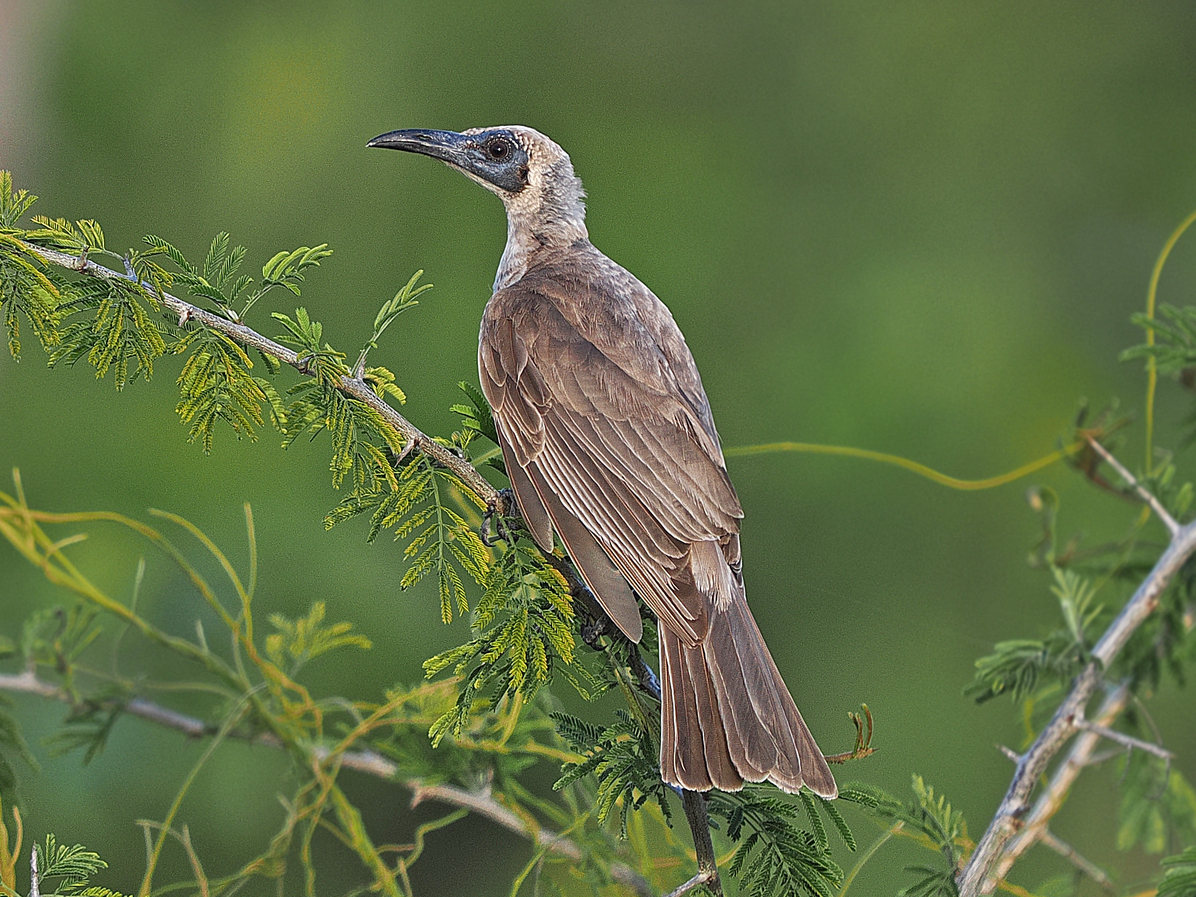

Conservation status
- Least Concern (IUCN 3.1)

Scientific classification
- Kingdom: Animalia
- Phylum: Chordata
- Class: Aves
- Order: Passeriformes
- Family: Meliphagidae
- Genus: Philemon
- Species: P. kisserensis

Binomial name
- Philemon kisserensis Meyer, 1884

= Grey friarbird =

Species of bird

The grey friarbird (Philemon kisserensis) is a species of bird in the family Meliphagidae. It is endemic to the southern Moluccas: Kisar, Leti and Moa islands.
