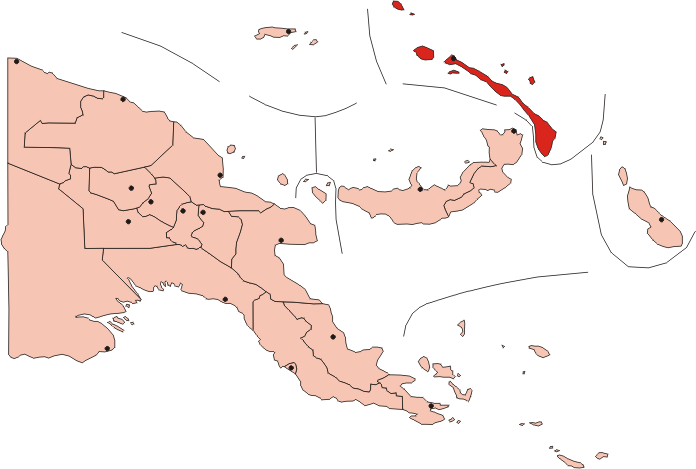

Conservation status
- Least Concern (IUCN 3.1)

Scientific classification
- Kingdom: Animalia
- Phylum: Chordata
- Class: Aves
- Order: Passeriformes
- Family: Meliphagidae
- Genus: Philemon
- Species: P. eichhorni

Binomial name
- Philemon eichhorni Rothschild & Hartert, 1924

= New Ireland friarbird =

Species of bird

The New Ireland friarbird (Philemon eichhorni) is a species of bird in the family Meliphagidae. It is endemic to Papua New Guinea.

Its natural habitats are the central and southern montane forests, where it is only rarely observed. The first audio recordings were obtained by a dedicated ornithological expedition to the Hans Meyer Range in 2026. The species had been lost to science for 15 years prior to these records.
