= Brass's friarbird =

Conservation status
- Least Concern (IUCN 3.1)

Scientific classification
- Kingdom: Animalia
- Phylum: Chordata
- Class: Aves
- Order: Passeriformes
- Family: Meliphagidae
- Genus: Philemon
- Species: P. brassi

Binomial name
- Philemon brassi Rand, 1940

Species of bird

Brass's friarbird (Philemon brassi) is a species of bird in the family Meliphagidae. It is endemic to West Papua, Indonesia.

Its natural habitats are subtropical or tropical moist lowland forests and swamps. It is threatened by habitat loss.

The common name and Latin binomial commemorate the Australian botanist, Leonard J. Brass (1900-1971), who worked for the Queensland Herbarium .
