= Children's Zoo at Celebration Square =

Zoo in Saginaw, Michigan, US

Saginaw Children's Zoo

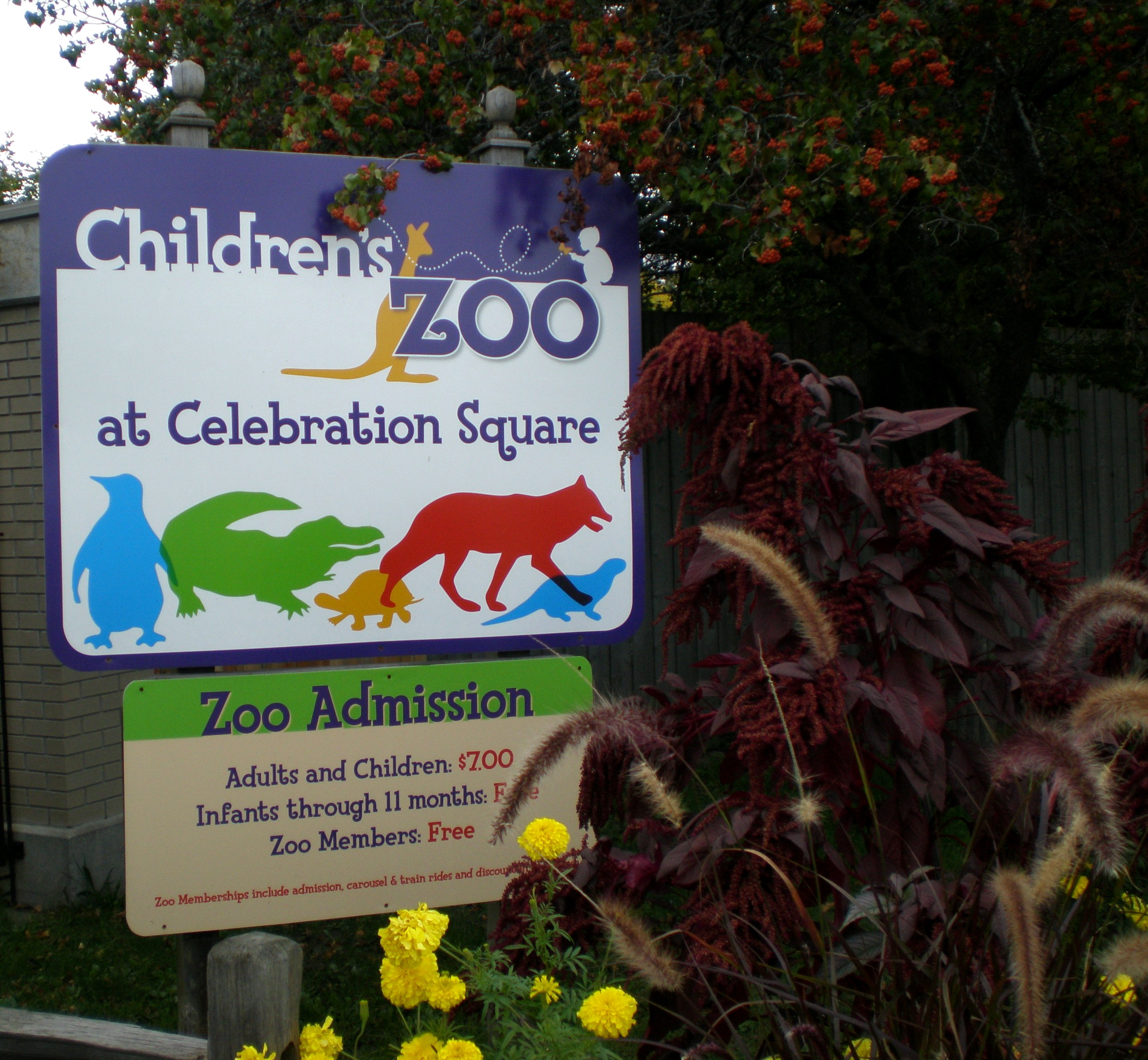
- Entrance sign at zoo
- Interactive map of Saginaw Children's Zoo
- 43°24′43″N 83°57′07″W
- Location: Saginaw, Michigan
- No. of animals: 150
- Memberships: AZA
- Public transit: STARS
- Website: www.saginawzoo.com

The Saginaw Children's Zoo, officially known as the Children's Zoo at Celebration Square, is a zoo located in Saginaw, Michigan. It is open during the months of May through September, and part-time in April and October.

Saginaw Children's Zoo is an accredited member of the Association of Zoos and Aquariums (AZA).

== Exhibits and other facilities ==
Mammals at the zoo include alpaca, pygmy goats, black-tailed prairie dog, miniature horse, cotton-top tamarin, Mexican grey wolf, North American river otter, eastern grey kangaroo, Hoffmann's two-toed sloth, white-throated capuchin, Virginia opossum, miniature pig, rabbits, and more.

Birds at the zoo include African penguin, bald eagle, barred owl, scarlet macaw, Indian peafowl, sun conure, masked bobwhite, domestic chicken, domestic duck, blue-faced honeyeater, zebra finch, salmon-crested cockatoo, and emu.

Reptiles and amphibians at the zoo include American alligator, boa constrictor, leopard tortoise, sulcata tortoise, Kenyan sand boa, spotted turtle, painted wood turtle, eastern box turtle, royal python, red-eared slider, uromastyx and tiger salamander.

The Iberschoff Special is the miniature train at the Children's Zoo. It was first opened in 1967 with the help of contributions from the Carl H. Iberschoff estate. The train, which resembles a vintage 1880 locomotive, is a model S-24 from the Allan Herschell Company. Due to lack of spare parts for maintenance and general repair, and concerns for the state of the track, the train was closed for the 2007 season. The track was rebuilt in 2008, and the locomotive went through a major rebuild, to reopen for the 2008 season. A tunnel removed in the initial renovation was replaced in 2009, and future plans include completely replacing the aging train.

The Carousel was constructed over an 18-month period at a cost of about $750,000 and 40,000 volunteer hours, and opened for riders on July 18, 1998. The carousel figures were carved by the Tri-City Wood Carvers, and were designed to resemble carousel figures from the early 1900s. The figures are all hollow to allow for expansion and contraction of the wood. Two chariot benches were provided for those who wish to sit rather than ride on an animal. Animals in the carousel include rabbits, many types of horse and pony, zebras, a sea monster, and fish. The Carousel includes carved rounding boards and framed artwork depicting local historical scenes.

Fossil Find was opened in 1998. It provides an area where children can dig for dinosaur bones and learn about prehistoric animals.

The Animal Stars building opened in 2005, and provided a place where visitors could view some of the zoo's educational animals when the animals are not working in a show. This building is now an office for Zoo employees.

The Wetland Experience, which opened in 2006, is a natural wetland ecosystem with plants and fish native to Michigan wetlands. It includes an underwater viewing area and a crawl-through "beaver dam."

== Education ==
The zoo provides many educational opportunities including family classes, one-, two-, or three-day zoo camps, various theme days, and a zoo outreach program. The Zoo Crew program lets teenagers 13 through 18 volunteer and learn about how a zoo works. Shows at the zoo amphitheater and keeper talks, demonstrations, and animal feedings throughout the day offer additional information to interested visitors.
