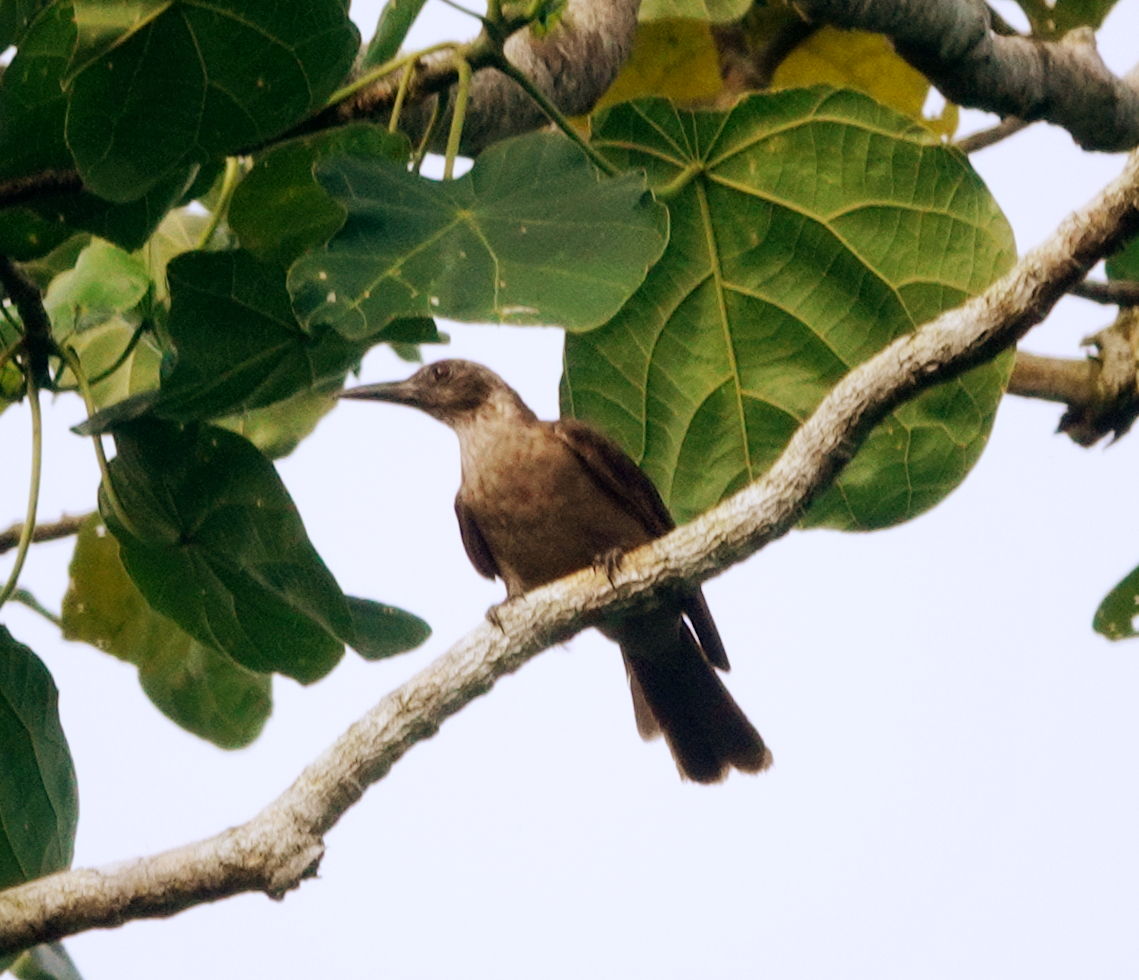

Conservation status
- Least Concern (IUCN 3.1)

Scientific classification
- Kingdom: Animalia
- Phylum: Chordata
- Class: Aves
- Order: Passeriformes
- Family: Oriolidae
- Genus: Oriolus
- Species: O. bouroensis

Binomial name
- Oriolus bouroensis (Quoy & Gaimard, 1832)

Synonyms
- Philedon bouroensis

= Black-eared oriole =

Species of bird

The black-eared oriole (Oriolus bouroensis), or Buru oriole, is a species of bird in the family Oriolidae. It is native to Buru island.

Its natural habitats are subtropical or tropical moist lowland forests, subtropical or tropical mangrove forests, and subtropical or tropical moist montane forests.

The black-eared oriole was originally described in the genus Philemon. Until 2008, the Tanimbar oriole was classified as a subspecies of the black-eared oriole. Some authorities have not yet recognized this split.
