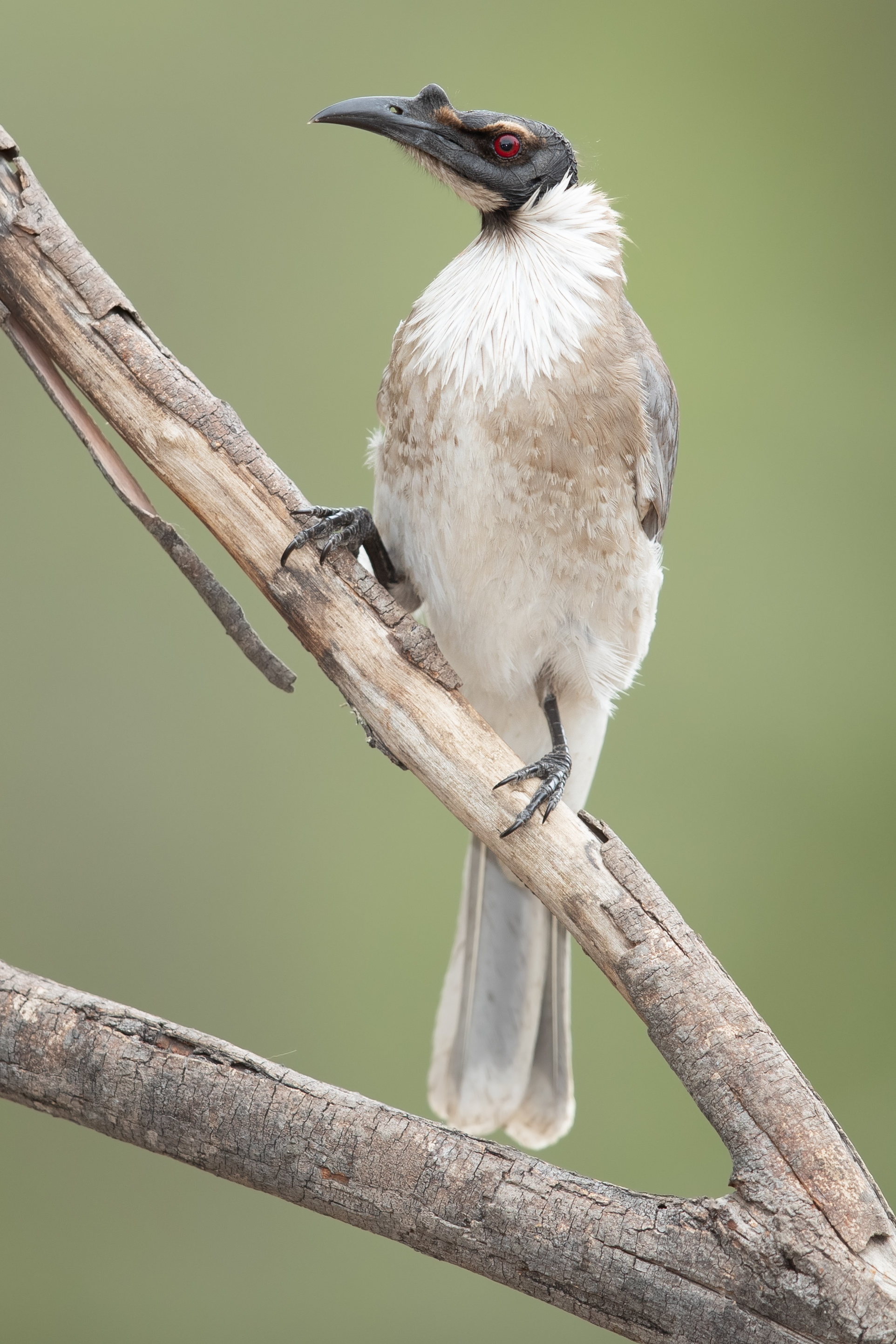
- Noisy friarbird, Philemon corniculatus

Scientific classification
- Kingdom: Animalia
- Phylum: Chordata
- Class: Aves
- Order: Passeriformes
- Family: Meliphagidae
- Genus: Philemon; Vieillot, 1816

Type species
- Merops moluccensis Gmelin, JF, 1788

= Friarbird =

Friarbirds

Genus of birds

The friarbirds, also called leatherheads, are a group of 18 relatively large honeyeaters in the genus Philemon. Additionally, the single member of the genus Melitograis is called the white-streaked friarbird. Friarbirds are found in Australia, Papua New Guinea, eastern Indonesia, and New Caledonia. They eat nectar, insects and other invertebrates, flowers, fruit, and seeds.

The friarbirds generally have drab plumage. They derive their name from the circular pattern at the crown of their heads and their neutral coloring, which makes them resemble friars. In many instances, their plumage is mimicked by smaller orioles, which use the aggressive nature of the friarbirds to avoid aggression themselves.

== Taxonomy ==
The genus Philemon was introduced in 1816 by the French ornithologist Louis Pierre Vieillot. Vieillot did not specify a type species but this was designated as the Buru friarbird by George Gray in 1840. The genus name is from Ancient Greek philēmōn meaning "affectionate" or "kissing".

The genus contains the following 16 species:

Image	Name	Common name
	Philemon meyeri	Meyer's friarbird
	Philemon brassi	Brass's friarbird
	Philemon citreogularis	Little friarbird
	Philemon kisserensis	Grey friarbird
	Philemon inornatus	Timor friarbird
	Philemon fuscicapillus	Morotai friarbird
	Philemon subcorniculatus	Seram friarbird
	Philemon moluccensis	Buru friarbird
	Philemon plumigenis	Tanimbar friarbird
	Philemon buceroides	Helmeted friarbird
	Philemon cockerelli	New Britain friarbird
	Philemon eichhorni	New Ireland friarbird
	Philemon albitorques	Manus friarbird
	Philemon argenticeps	Silver-crowned friarbird
	Philemon corniculatus	Noisy friarbird
	Philemon diemenensis	New Caledonian friarbird

Formerly, some authorities also considered the black-eared oriole (as Philedon bouroensis) a species within the genus Philemon.
