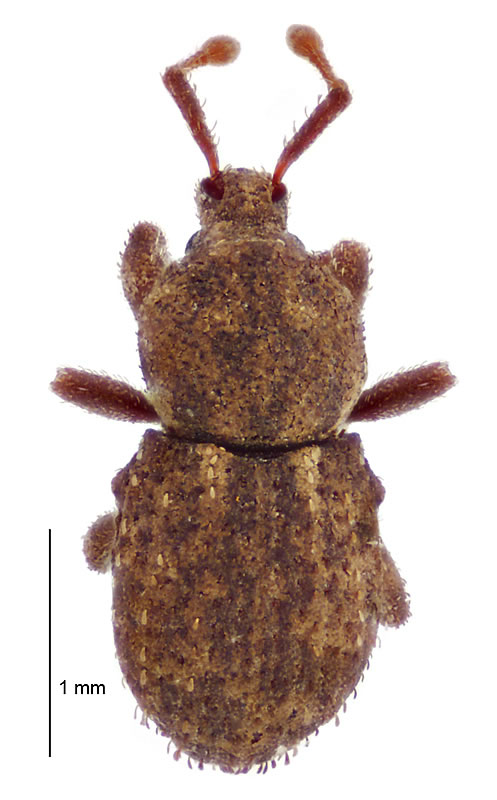
- Dorsal view of a Mandalotus

Scientific classification
- Kingdom: Animalia
- Phylum: Arthropoda
- Class: Insecta
- Order: Coleoptera
- Suborder: Polyphaga
- Infraorder: Cucujiformia
- Family: Curculionidae
- Subfamily: Entiminae
- Genus: Mandalotus; Erichson, 1842

= Mandalotus =

Genus of beetles

Mandalotus is a genus of weevils in the family Curculionidae. The species are considered crop pests in Australia.
