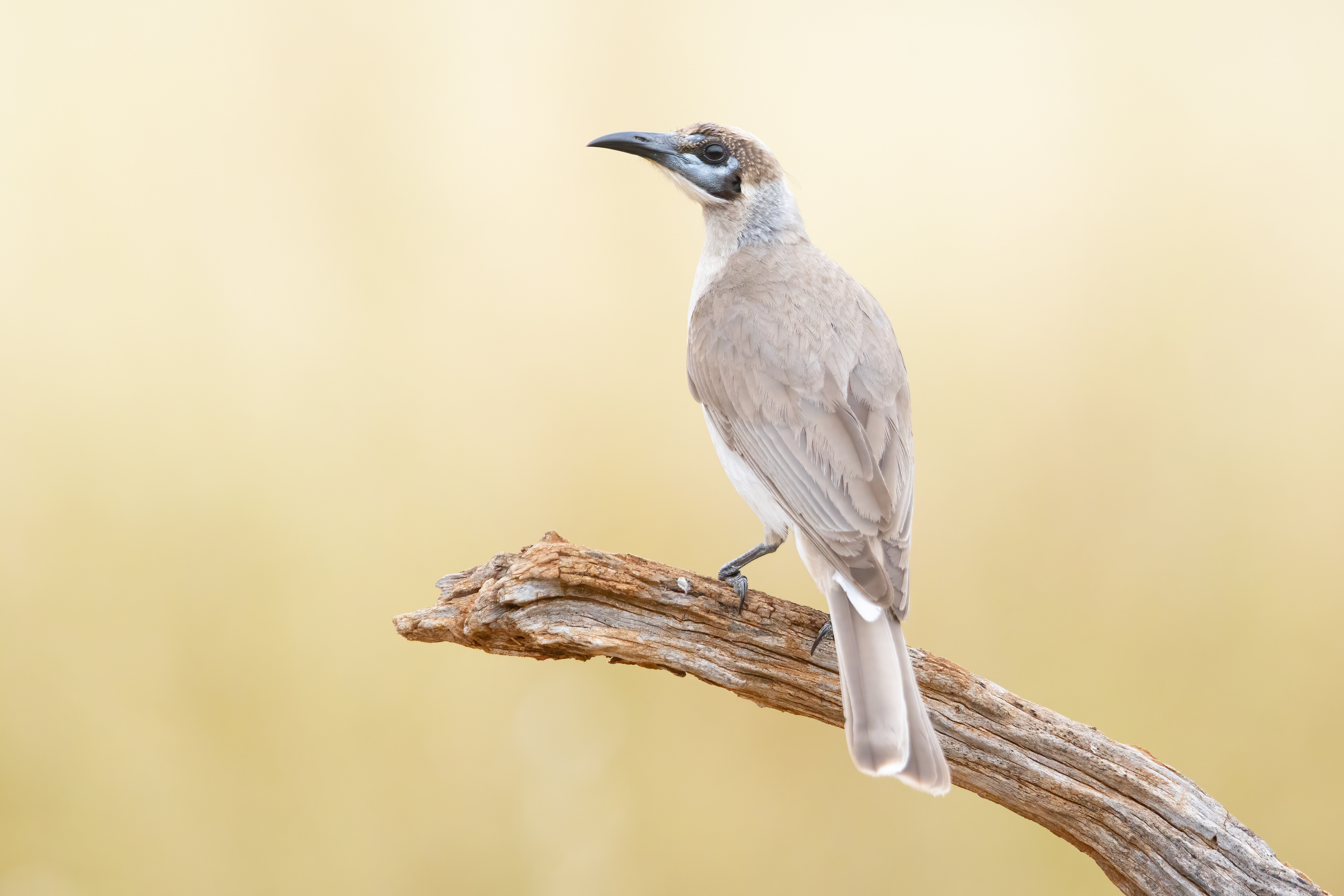

Conservation status
- Least Concern (IUCN 3.1)

Scientific classification
- Kingdom: Animalia
- Phylum: Chordata
- Class: Aves
- Order: Passeriformes
- Family: Meliphagidae
- Genus: Philemon
- Species: P. citreogularis

Binomial name
- Philemon citreogularis (Gould, 1837)

= Little friarbird =

Species of bird

The little friarbird (Philemon citreogularis), also known as the little leatherhead or yellow-throated friarbird, is the smallest of the friarbirds within the Philemon genus. It is found throughout northern and eastern Australia as well as southern Papua New Guinea. It lives a very prominent life, whereby it can easily be seen chasing other honeyeaters, and also it is very vocal. However, the little friarbird is usually spotted high up in trees, rarely being seen on the ground.

== Description ==
The little friarbird ranges from 25–30 centimetres (9.8–11.8 in) in length. The average size tends to be 27 centimetres (11 in) with an average weight of 67 grams (2.4 oz). Although males and females tend to be very similar in appearance, males are larger.

The little friarbird can be easily distinguished from other friarbirds by the absence of a casque (a prominent ridge or bump present on the beak). Another key recognisable feature is the bare blue skin present under the eye which widens over the cheek. (The bare blue skin can vary from grey to black in tone.) Dark feathers are present both above and below the blue skin. The top of the head and body are a dark grey-brown with a dull white fringe present on the nape which flows around to a wide patch on the side of the neck. Fine silky white feathers are present under the chin with silvery white streaks flowing down the breast merging to pale grey for the underbody of the little friarbird.

The little friarbird also has a black curved bill, dark brown eyes with bluish black legs. Its flight characteristics involve wing-beats which are shallow and quivering in nature. The tail is clearly square-cut when spread with slight pale tips present on the tail feathers.

=== Juveniles ===
Juvenile little friarbirds tend to have a paler appearance with a lighter facial skin. The chin, throat and, in some cases, upper breast tend to appear as a washed yellow with yellow spots on the side of the breast. The term 'citreogularis' is frequently used to describe young birds which have a yellow fore-neck. The tail feathers also tend to appear with a shallower cut, unlike those of adult little friarbirds.

=== Voice ===
The little friarbird has a very distinct voice consisting of a repeated liquid mellow "gee-wit" or "chewip". When breeding, the song is extended and includes chattering scoldings. A common sequence may be paraphrased as "rackety-crookshank".

== Diet ==
The little friarbird has been observed feeding alone, in pairs and small flocks. However, they are rarely seen feeding on the ground as they prefer to remain in the trees and feed with other honeyeaters in mixed groups. They feed on nectar, blossoms, fruit, invertebrates, and sometimes flowers and seeds.

== Distribution and habitat ==
The little friarbird is present most predominantly in northern Australia with seasonal movements to south-east Australia. They have been witnessed from the district of Broome in Western Australia through the Kimberleys into the northern portion of the Northern Territory. They have been sighted throughout most of Queensland going as far inland as Mount Isa and Opalton. In summer, they also spread throughout the south-east of Australia inhabiting the states of New South Wales, Victoria and South Australia, and the Australian Capital Territory.

The little friarbird has been sighted along the Murray River and throughout the Riverina within New South Wales. In Victoria, the little friarbird is seen in the north-central region of the state, and near prominent bodies of water, such as Hattah Lakes. Sightings occur as far as Morgan on the Murray River in South Australia. They are also present in southern Papua New Guinea and on several islands adjacent to Australia.

The little friarbird is found most predominantly around water bodies. They can be seen in swamp woodlands, mangroves, shrub communities, open forests and woodlands dominated by Eucalyptus tree species. They also inhabit orchards, vineyards and gardens during a good flowering season. They may also inhabit arid zones, but only where water bodies extend well into the area.

== Breeding ==
Little friarbirds form monogamous pairs to breed. Breeding records vary with the earliest being witnessed in July through to the latest in February. Pairs share the role of building the nest which is a deep open cup that is flimsy and able to be seen through (eggs are visible). The nest comprises a large variety of materials including bark fiber, fine grass, spiders' web, rootlets, and hair. The nest is usually built over a water body low in tree branches, 2–10 meters high, and suspended from twigs or within dropped foliage. A clutch usually consist of 2–3 eggs (sometimes 4), which tend to be an oval to tapered oval shape, averaging 20 by 27 millimetres (0.79 in × 1.06 in) in size. The eggs appear chestnut in colour and can be a whitish pink to salmon red, or spotted purplish-red to purple. Up to 2 broods can be raised within a single breeding season with the female being the sole incubator of the eggs. A single nesting period tends to take 14 days within which 13 days of incubation occurs. During the breeding season, the little friarbird is often parasitized by the common koel (Eudynamys scolopacea), a common cuckoo species.

== Gallery ==
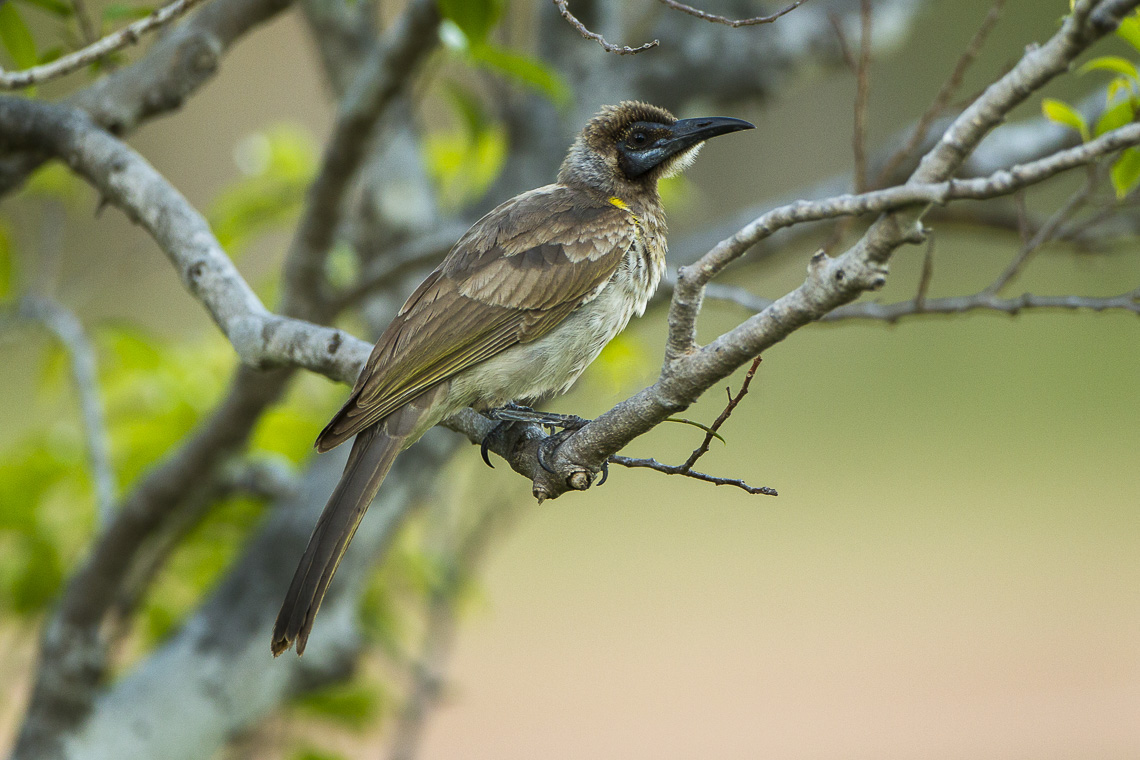
Little friarbird, Darwin, Northern Territory
