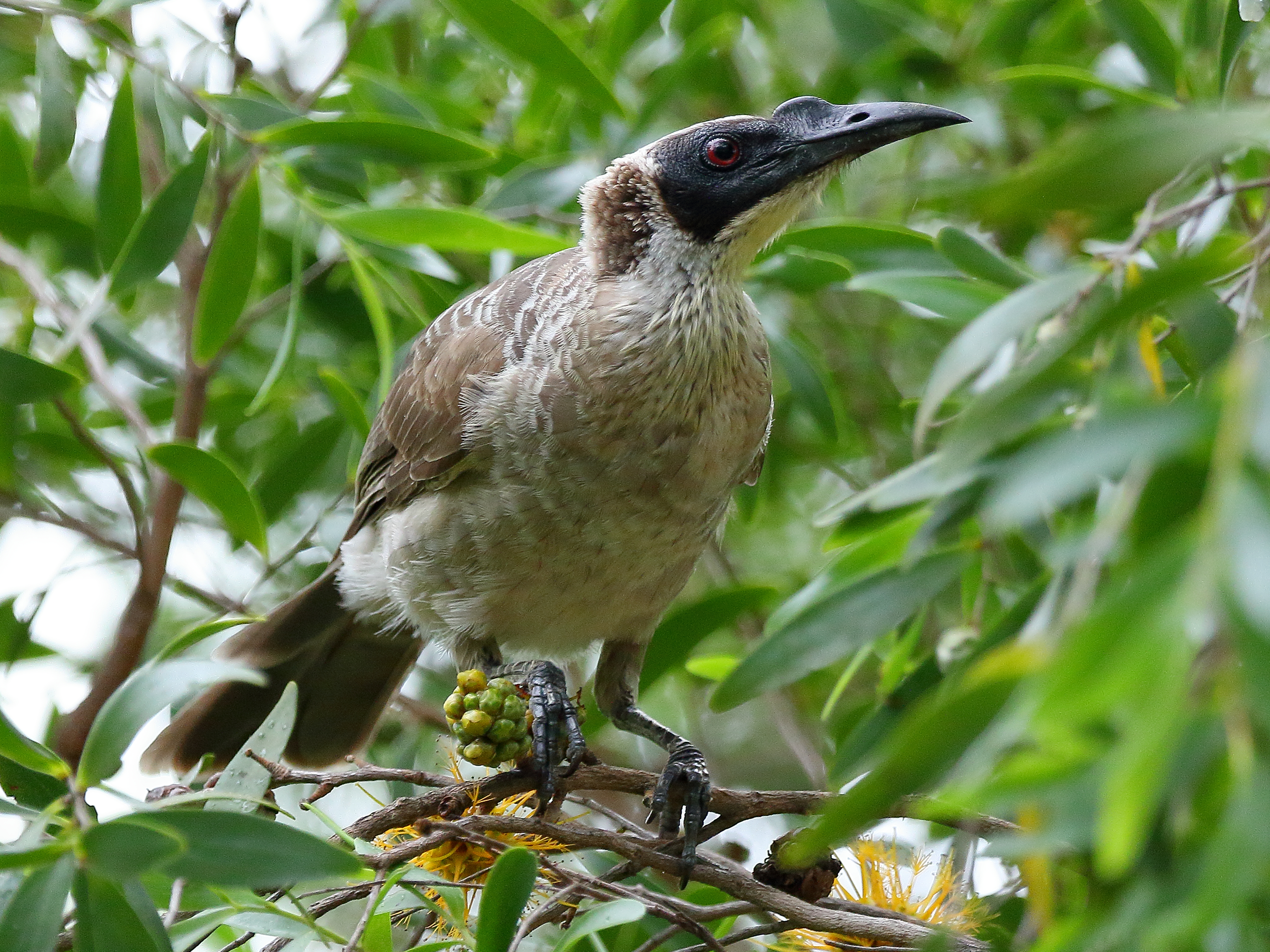

Conservation status
- Least Concern (IUCN 3.1)

Scientific classification
- Kingdom: Animalia
- Phylum: Chordata
- Class: Aves
- Order: Passeriformes
- Family: Meliphagidae
- Genus: Philemon
- Species: P. argenticeps

Binomial name
- Philemon argenticeps (Gould, 1840)

= Silver-crowned friarbird =

Species of bird

The silver-crowned friarbird (Philemon argenticeps) is a species of bird in the family Meliphagidae.It is endemic to northern Australia, including Queensland.

Its natural habitats are subtropical or tropical dry forests and subtropical or tropical mangrove forests.
