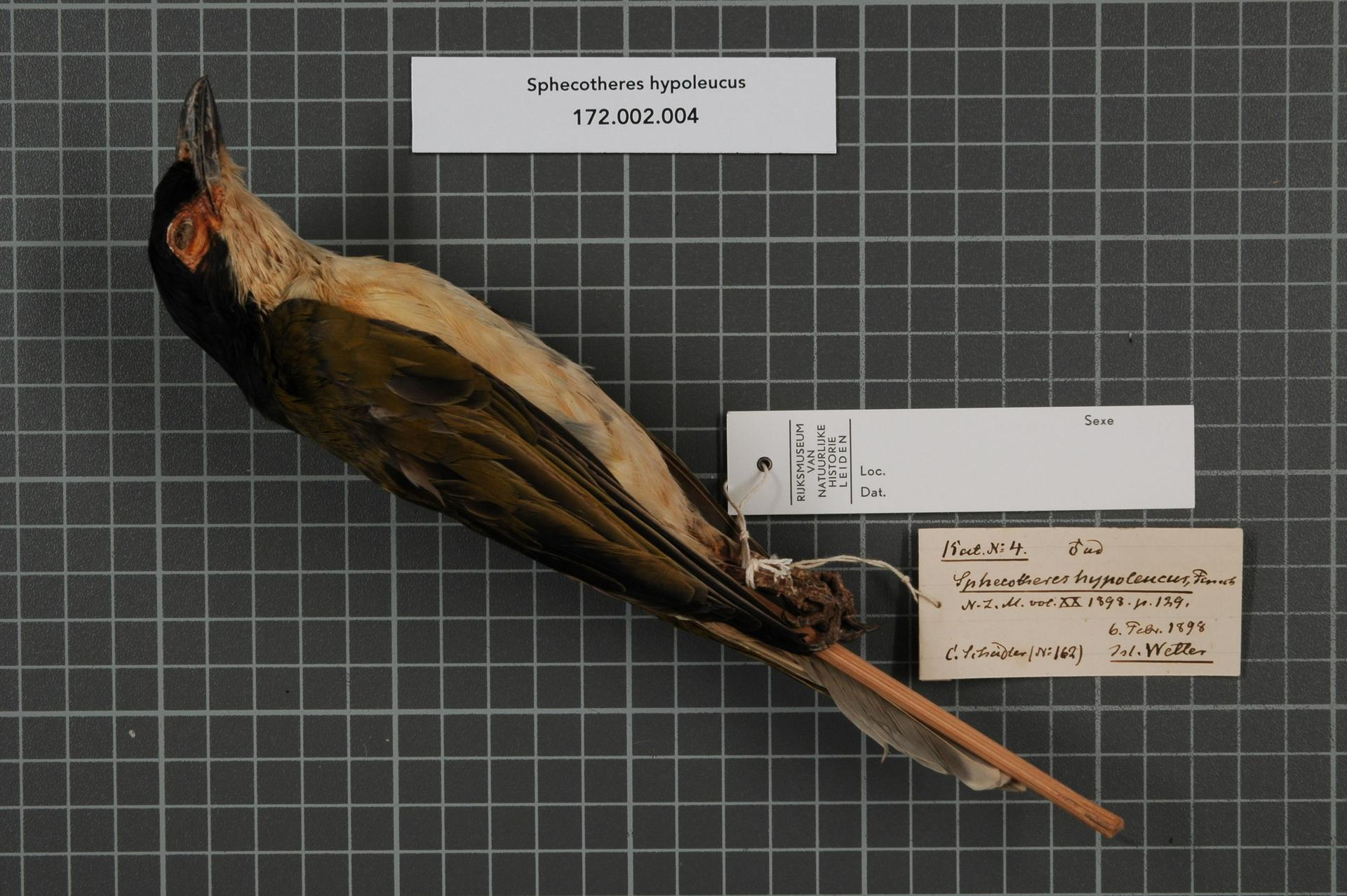

Conservation status
- Least Concern (IUCN 3.1)

Scientific classification
- Kingdom: Animalia
- Phylum: Chordata
- Class: Aves
- Order: Passeriformes
- Family: Oriolidae
- Genus: Sphecotheres
- Species: S. hypoleucus

Binomial name
- Sphecotheres hypoleucus Finsch, 1898

Synonyms
- Sphecotheres viridis hypoleucus

= Wetar figbird =

Species of bird

The Wetar figbird (Sphecotheres hypoleucus) is a species of bird in the family Oriolidae. It is endemic to forest, woodland and scrub on the Indonesian island of Wetar. The Wetar figbird remains poorly known, and although threatened by habitat loss, recent population estimates are greater than originally estimated, resulting in it being now listed as Least Concern by BirdLife International and the IUCN. The Wetar figbird resembles the better known Australasian figbird, but is much smaller and the male has entirely white underparts. Formerly, it has been considered a subspecies of the green figbird, but they are now classified as two separate species.
