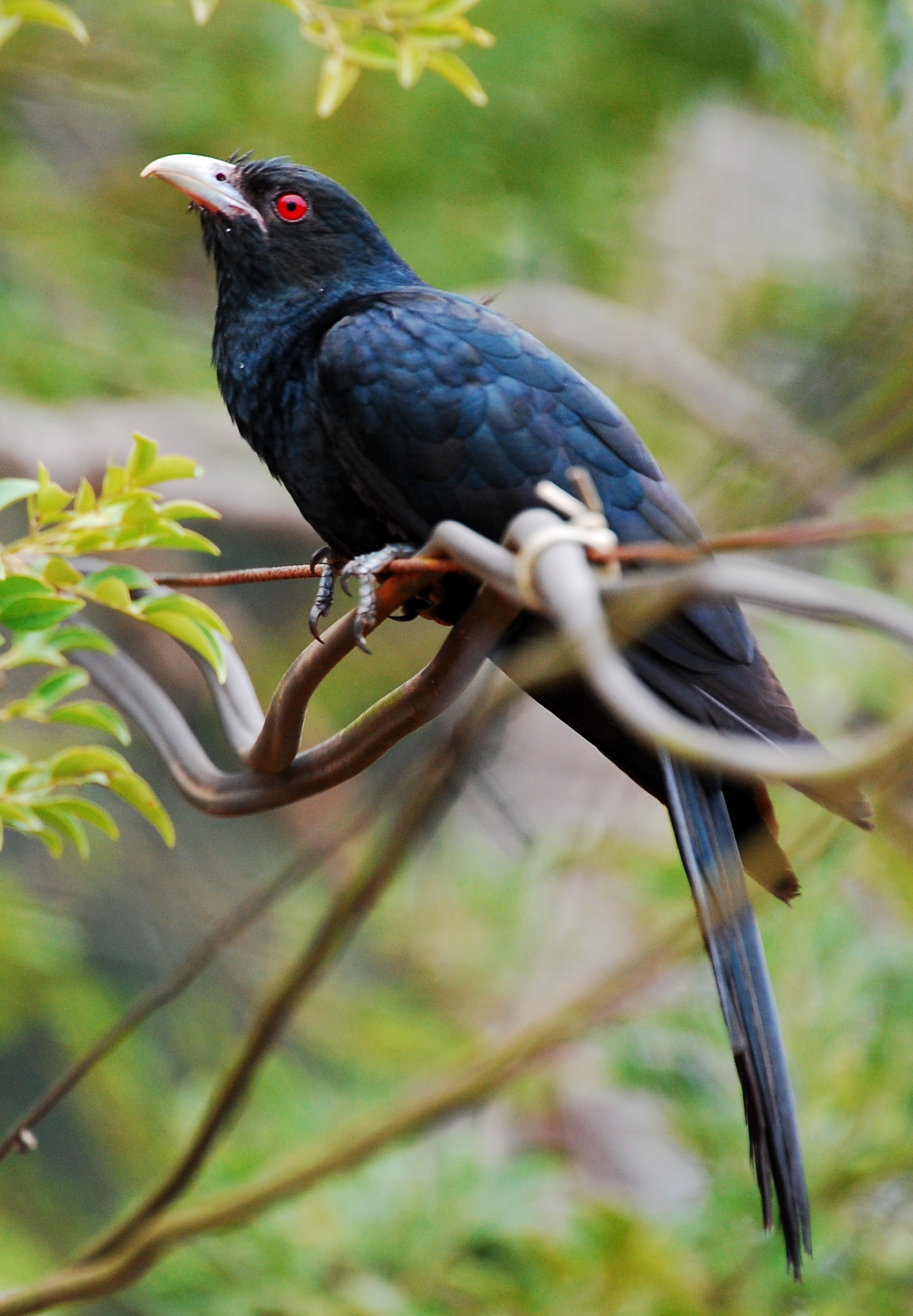
- Male (nominate race)
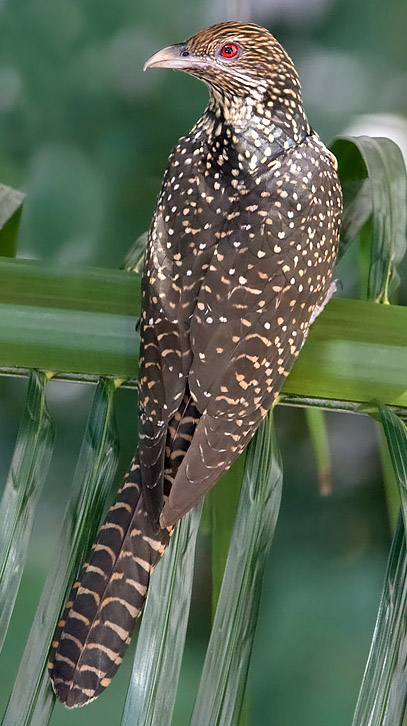
- Female (nominate race) Asian Koel (recorded in Kochi, India) Male Asian Koel (recorded in Chon Buri, Thailand) Asian koel. (recorded in Sri Lanka)

Conservation status
- Least Concern (IUCN 3.1)

Scientific classification
- Kingdom: Animalia
- Phylum: Chordata
- Class: Aves
- Order: Cuculiformes
- Family: Cuculidae
- Genus: Eudynamys
- Species: E. scolopaceus

Binomial name
- Eudynamys scolopaceus (Linnaeus, 1758)
- The distribution of Asian koel in black

Synonyms
- Cuculus scolopaceus Linnaeus, 1758; Cuculus honoratus Linnaeus, 1766

= Asian koel =

Species of bird

The Asian koel (Eudynamys scolopaceus) is a member of the cuckoo family of birds, the Cuculidae. It is found in the Indian subcontinent, China, and Southeast Asia. It forms a superspecies with the closely related black-billed koels, and Pacific koels which are sometimes treated as subspecies. The Asian koel, like many of its related cuckoo kin, is a brood parasite that lays its eggs in the nests of crows and other hosts, who raise its young. They are unusual among the cuckoos in being largely frugivorous as adults. The name koel is echoic in origin with several language variants. The bird is a widely used symbol in Indian, Pakistani and Nepali poetry.

== Taxonomy ==
In 1747, the English naturalist George Edwards included an illustration and a description of an Asian koel in the second volume of his A Natural History of Uncommon Birds book. He used the English name "The Brown and Spotted Indian Cuckow". Edwards based his hand-coloured etching on a specimen from Bengal that belonged to the London silk-pattern designer and naturalist Joseph Dandridge. When in 1758 the Swedish naturalist Carl Linnaeus updated his Systema Naturae for the tenth edition, he placed the Asian koel with the other cuckoos in the genus Cuculus. Linnaeus included a brief description, coined the binomial name Cuculus scolopaceus and cited Edwards' work. The Asian koel is now placed in the genus Eudynamys that was introduced in 1827 by the English naturalists Nicholas Vigors and Thomas Horsfield. The genus name Eudynamys combines the Ancient Greek eu meaning "fine" with dunamis meaning "power" or "strength". The specific epithet scolopaceus is Modern Latin meaning "snipe-like" from Latin scolopax meaning "snipe" or "woodcock".

The species has variations within its wide range with several island populations and a number of taxonomic variations have been suggested. The black-billed koel (E. melanorhynchus) of the Sulawesi region and the Pacific koel of Australasia are sometimes considered conspecific with the Asian koel in which case the "combined" species is known as the common koel. Due to differences in plumage, colour of bill and voice, the three are increasingly treated as separate species. Alternatively, only the black-billed koel has been considered as a separate species, or the Asian koel has included all subspecies otherwise included in the Pacific koel, except for the subspecies breeding in Australia, which then has the name Australian koel (E. cyanocephalus).

The Asian koel has several geographic forms that have well marked plumage differences or have been geographically isolated with little gene flow. The following is a list of named subspecies with their distributions and synonyms as given by Payne:

- E. s. scolopaceus (Linnaeus, 1758) – Pakistan, India, Nepal, Bangladesh, Sri Lanka, Laccadives and Maldives
- E. s. chinensis Cabanis and Heine, 1863 – Southern China and Indochina, except the Thai-Malay Peninsula
- E. s. harterti Ingram, C 1912 – Hainan
- E. s. malayana Cabanis and Heine, 1863 – Thai-Malay Peninsula, Lesser Sundas and Greater Sundas, except Sulawesi. May include the race dolosa described from the Andaman and Nicobar Islands
- E. s. mindanensis (Linnaeus, 1766) – (includes E. s. paraguena) (Hachisuka, 1934) from Palawan, and E. s. corvina (Stresemann, 1931) from Halmahera, the Philippines (including Palawan and the Babuyan Islands), islands between Mindanao and Sulawesi, and North Maluku, except the Sula Islands

== Description ==
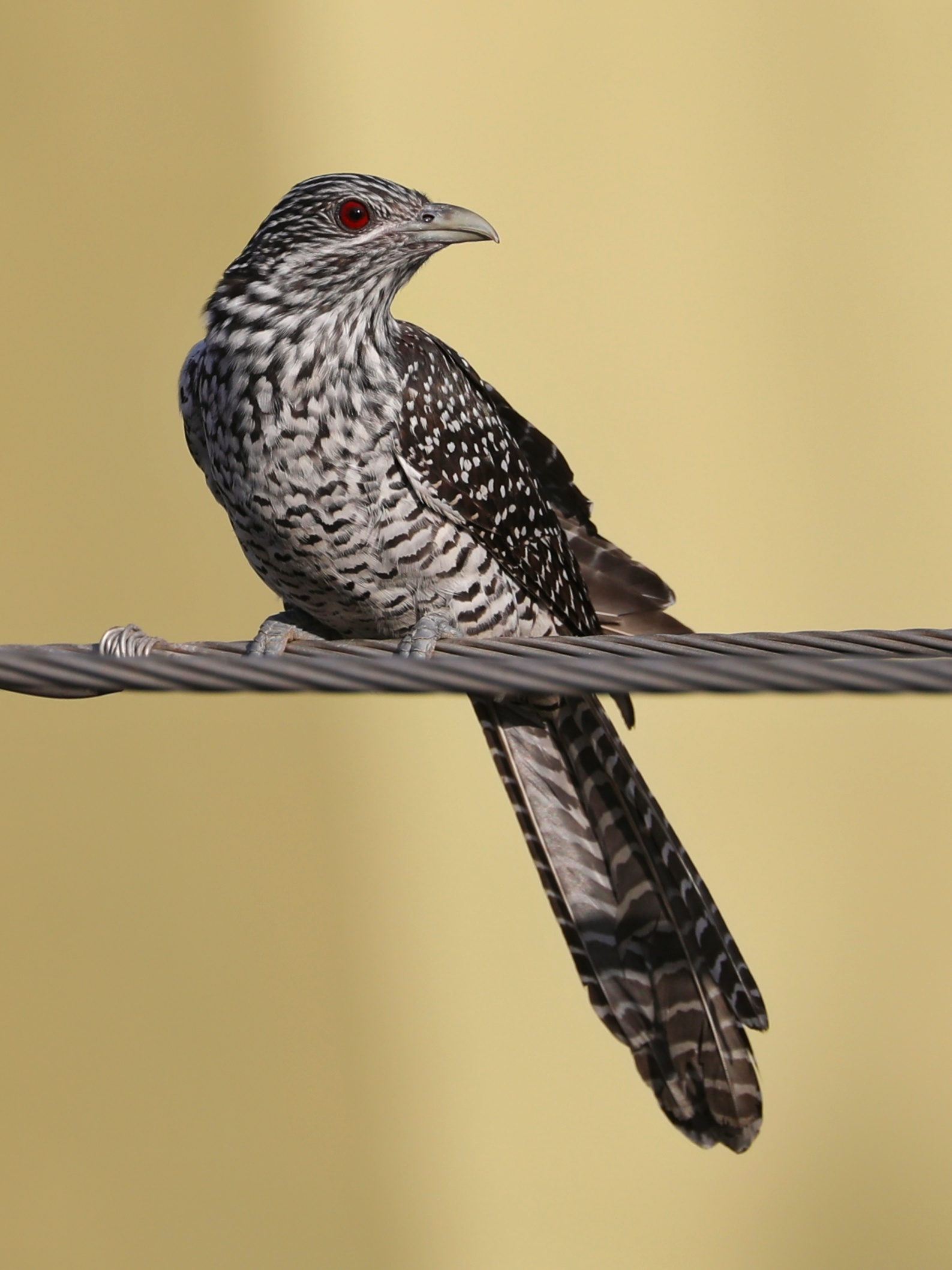
A female of the nominate subspecies

The Asian koel is a large and long-tailed cuckoo measuring 39–46 cm (15–18 in) and weighing 190–327 g (6.7–11.5 oz). The male of the nominate race is glossy bluish-black, with a pale greenish grey bill, the iris is crimson, and it has grey legs and feet. The female of the nominate race is brownish on the crown and has rufous streaks on the head. The back, rump and wing coverts are dark brown with white and buff spots. The underparts are whitish, but is heavily striped. The other subspecies differ in colouration and size. The upper plumage of young birds is more like that of the male and they have a black beak. They are very vocal during the breeding season (March to August in the Indian Subcontinent), with a range of different calls. The familiar song of the male is a repeated koo-Ooo. The female makes a shrill kik-kik-kik... call. Calls vary across populations.

They show a pattern of moult that differs from those of other parasitic cuckoos. The outer primaries show a transilient (alternating) ascending moult (P9-7-5-10-8-6) while the inner primaries are moulted in stepwise descending order (1-2-3-4).(Payne citing Stresemann and Stresemann 1961)

== Distribution and habitat ==
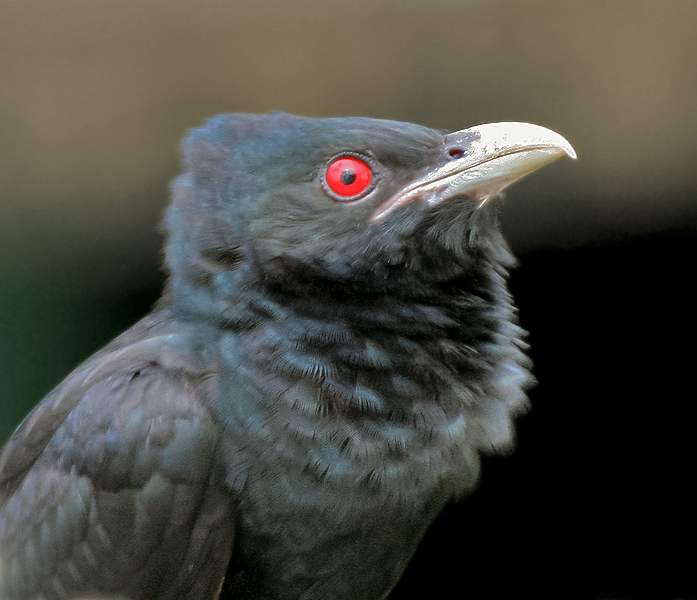
Adult male of nominate race (West Bengal, India) showing the crimson iris. Young birds have dark irides.

The Asian koel is a bird of light woodland and cultivation. It is a mainly resident breeder in tropical southern Asia from Iran, Pakistan, India, Bangladesh, Maldives, and Sri Lanka to southern China and the Greater Sundas. They have great potential in colonizing new areas, and were among the pioneer birds to colonize the volcanic island of Krakatau. They first arrived in Singapore in the 1980s and became very common birds.

Some populations may make long-distance movements being found in places like Australia.

== Behaviour ==
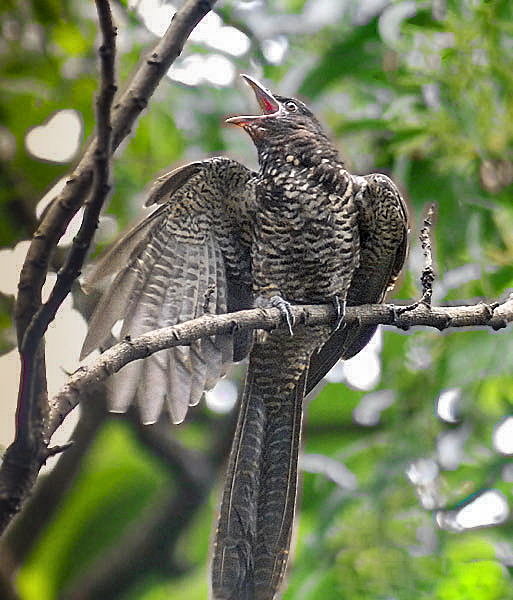
Immature female (nominate race) begging for food.

The Asian koel is a brood parasite, and lays its single egg in the nests of a variety of birds, including the jungle crow, and house crow. In Sri Lanka before 1880 it was only known to parasitize the jungle crow, later shifting to the house crow. A study in India found 5% of Corvus splendens and 0.5% of Corvus macrorhynchos nests parasitized.

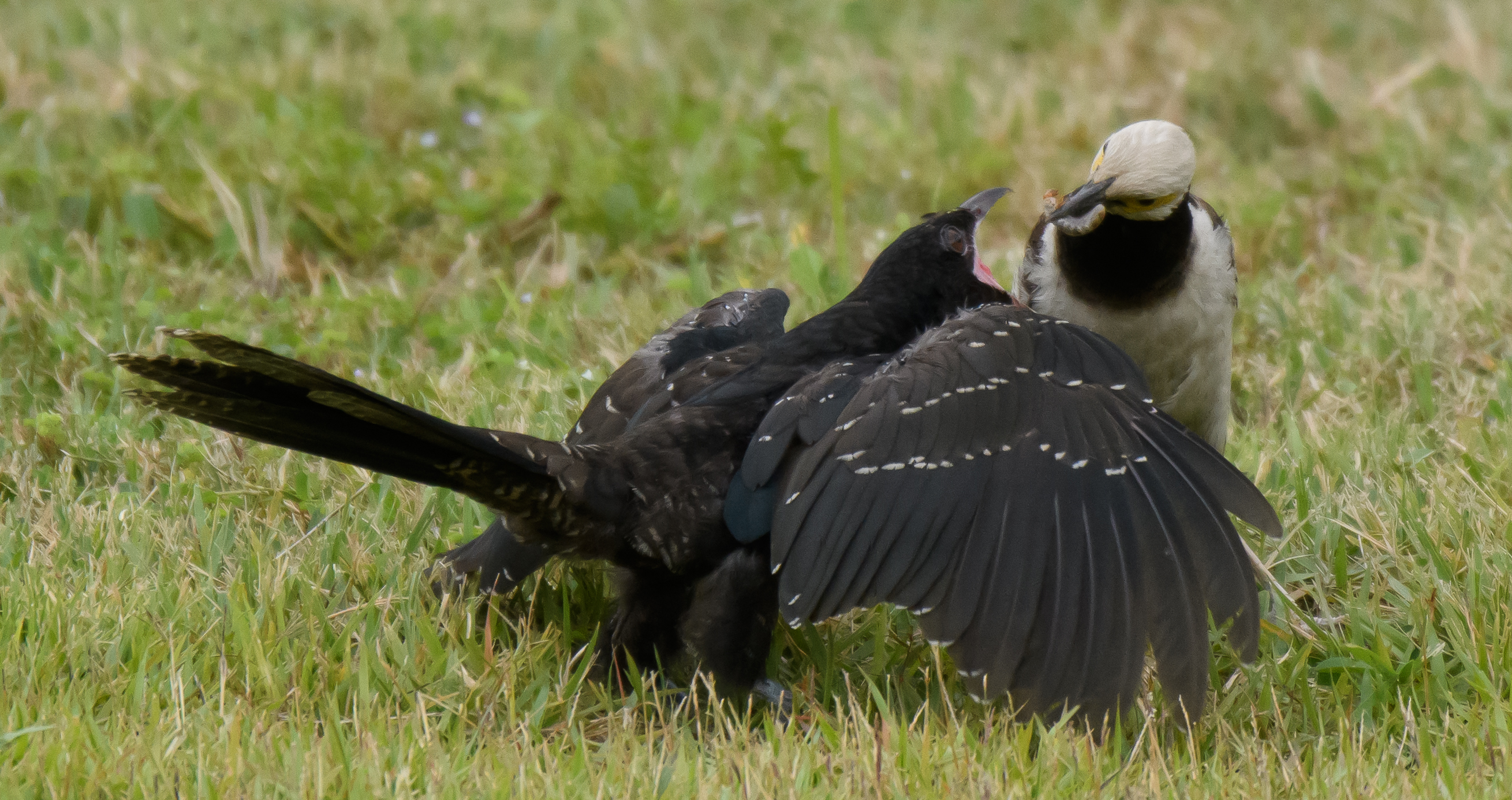
An Asian koel being fed by a black-collared starling.

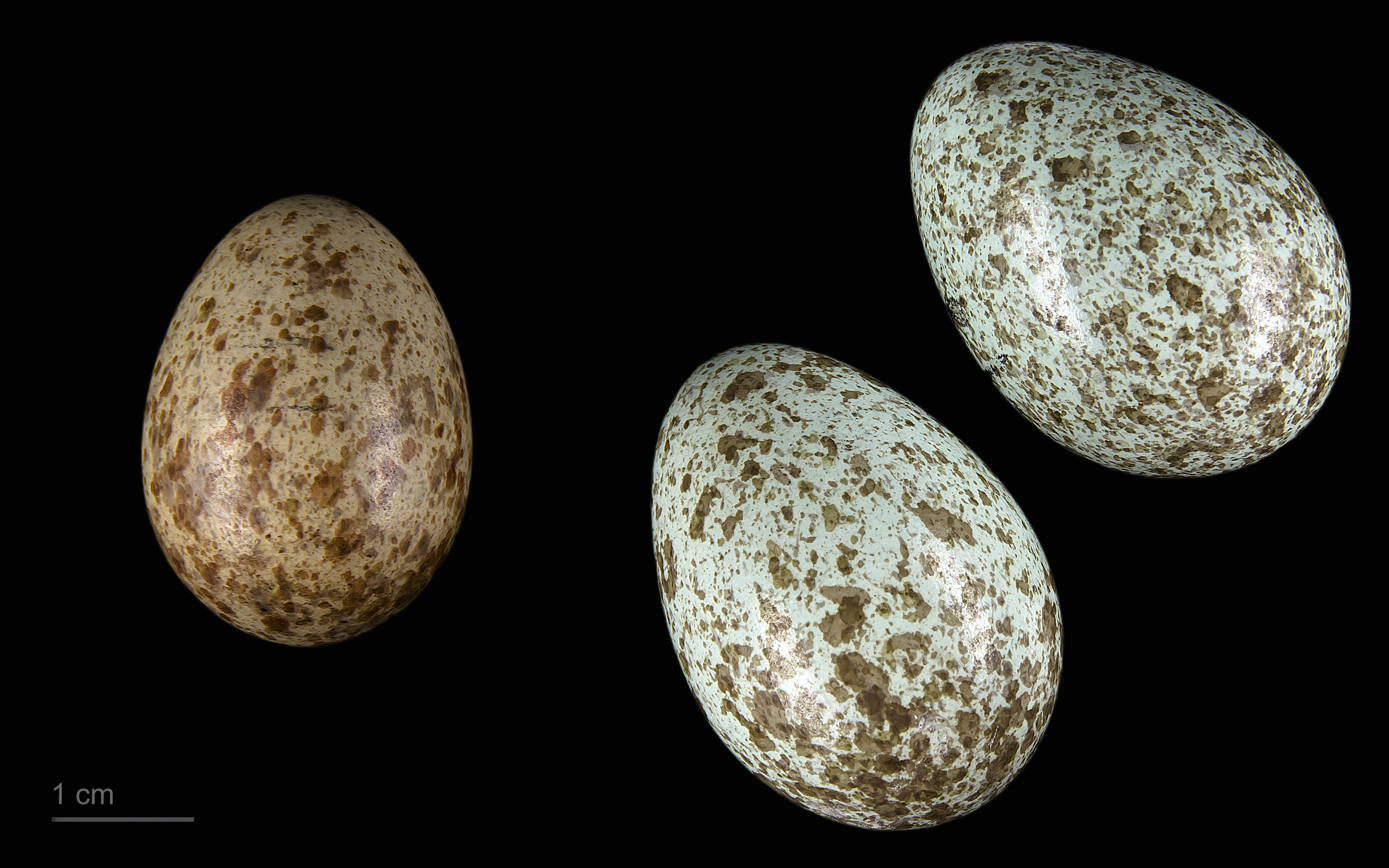
Eudynamys scolopaceus in a clutch of Corvus splendens - MHNT

In Bangladesh, they parasitise long-tailed shrike (Lanius schach), common myna (Acridotheres tristis) and house crows (Corvus splendens) at about 35.7, 31.2 and 10.8% rates respectively. Host nests at low heights and nearer to fruit trees tended to be preferred by koels. In Southern Thailand and the Malay Peninsula, koels have shifted host from crows to mynas (Acridotheres sp.) as the latter became more common in the late 1900s. A record exists of black drongo raising a koel, and other hosts recorded include the European magpie and possibly the black-headed oriole. In the Philippines, Asian Koels have been found to parasitize the cavity nest of Coletos (Sarcops calvus). Males may distract the hosts so that the female gets a chance to lay an egg in the nest. More often however, the female visits the nest of the host alone. The koel is not known to lay eggs in an empty host nest and a study in Pakistan found that the first koel eggs were laid, on average, within one and half days of the laying of the host's first egg. The chicks of the koel hatched about 3 days ahead of the host chicks. Koels usually lay only an egg or two in a single nest but as many as seven to eleven eggs have been reported from some host nests. A female may remove a host egg before laying. Eggs hatch in 12 to 14 days. The young koel does not always push out eggs or evict the host chicks, and initially calls like a crow. The young fledge in 20 to 28 days. Unlike some other cuckoos, the young do not attempt to kill the host chicks, a trait that is shared with the channel-billed cuckoos which are also largely frugivorous as adults. Some scholars, Rebecca Kilner in particular, have suggested that koels, like some other brood parasites, do not evict the host chicks as a result of higher costs which might outweigh the benefits of evicting nestmates. A small parasite may not be able to evict large host eggs or chicks from a deep Corvid nest without risking starvation and possibly accidental self-eviction. An alternative hypothesis that retaining host chicks might benefit the koel chicks did not gain much support. Adult female parents have been known to feed young koels in the nests of the hosts, a behaviour seen in some other brood parasitic species as well. Adult males have however not been noted to feed fledglings.

The Asian koel is omnivorous, consuming a variety of insects, caterpillars, eggs and small vertebrates. Adults feed mainly on fruit. They will sometimes defend fruiting trees that they forage in and chase away other frugivores. They have been noted to be especially important in the dispersal of the sandalwood tree (Santalum album) in India. Large seeded fruits are sometimes quickly regurgitated near the parent tree while small seeded fruits are ingested and are likely to be deposited at greater distances from the parent tree. They have a large gape and are capable of swallowing large fruits including the hard fruit of palms such as Arenga and Livistona. They have been known to occasionally take eggs of small birds.

They feed on the fruits of Cascabela thevetia which are known to be toxic to mammals.

A number of parasites of the species have been described, including malaria-like protozoa, lice and nematodes.

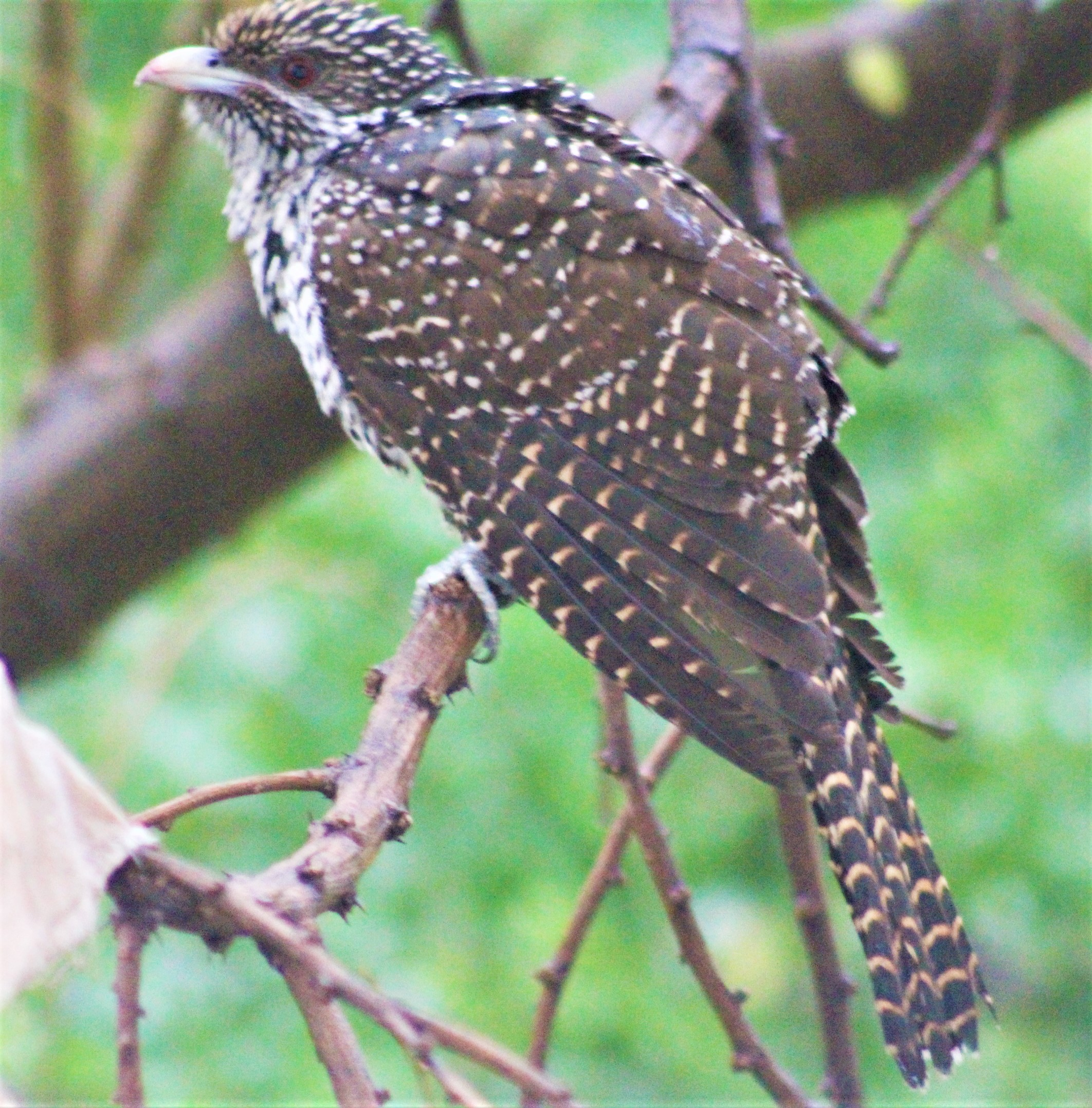
Eudynamys scolopaceus scolopaceus, India

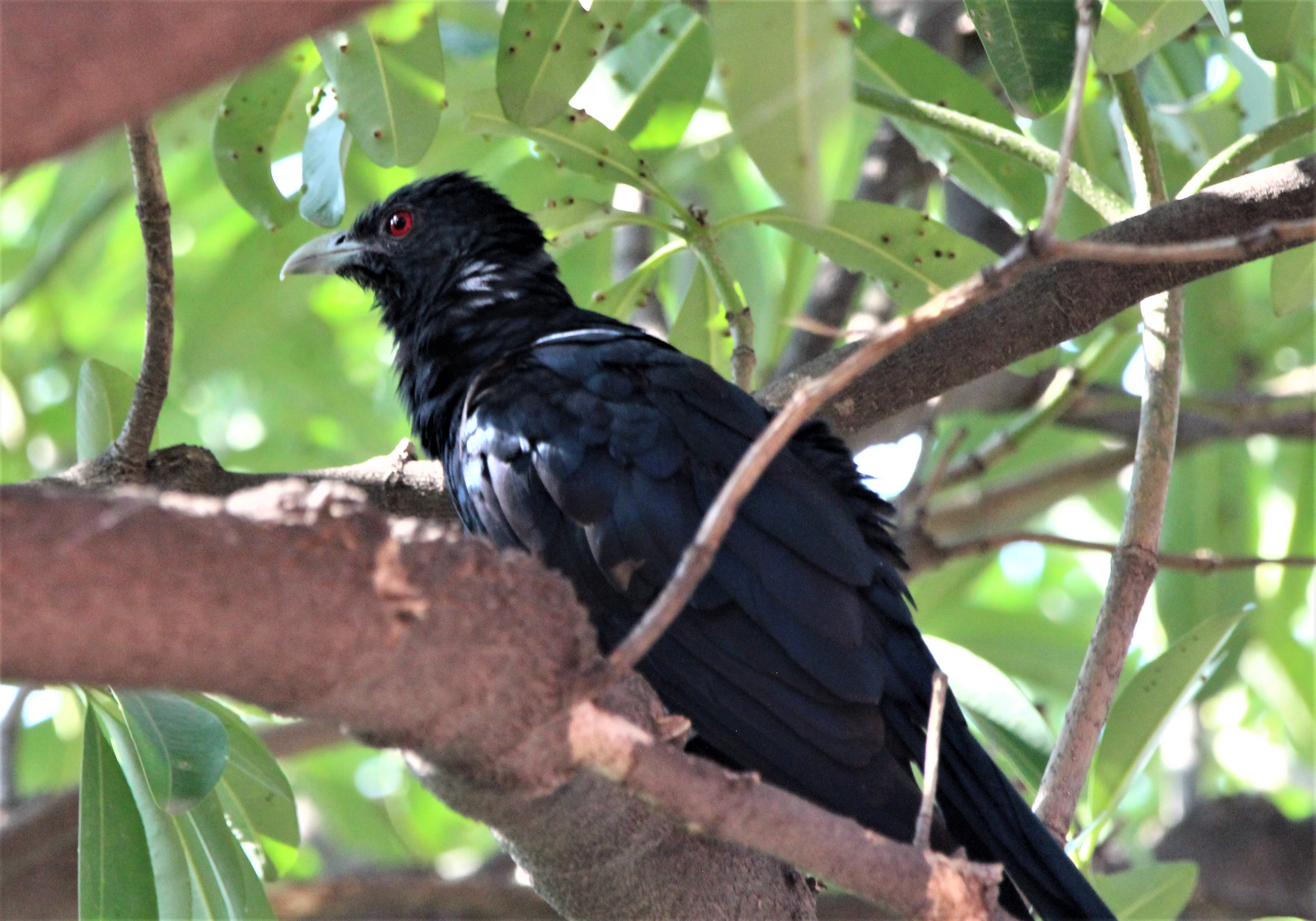
Asian koel at Chandigarh.

== In culture ==
The word "koel" is onomatopoeic in origin. The Sanskrit name of "Kokila" and words in several Indian languages are similarly echoic. Being familiar birds with loud calls, references to them are common in folklore, myth and poetry. It is traditionally held in high regard for its song and revered in the Manusmriti, with a decree protecting them from harm. The Vedas, Sanskrit literature dated to about 2000 BC referred to it as Anya-Vapa which has been translated as "that which was raised by others" (or "sown for others to reap"). This has been interpreted as the earliest written reference to brood parasitism. It has been chosen as the state bird by the Indian union territory of Puducherry.

These birds were once very popular in India as cagebirds. Feeding even on boiled rice, these hardy birds lived in captivity for as long as 14 years.

In Sri Lanka, Koel has an unbreakable bond with the Sinhalese New Year as according to the beliefs, the call of koels signify the arrival of the new year in the month of April.
