= Stormbird =

Stormbird may refer to:

- Pacific koel, a bird colloquially referred to as a 'storm bird' or 'stormbird' in Australia
- Storm Bird (horse) (1978–2004), a Canadian-bred thoroughbred racehorse
- Stormbirds Football Club Football Federation Northern Territory
- Sturmvogel, Stormbird Messerschmitt Me 262
- Stormbird, a 2013 novel by Conn Iggulden, the first of four books in the Wars of the Roses series
- Stormbirds (video game) redirects to THQ Digital Studios UK
