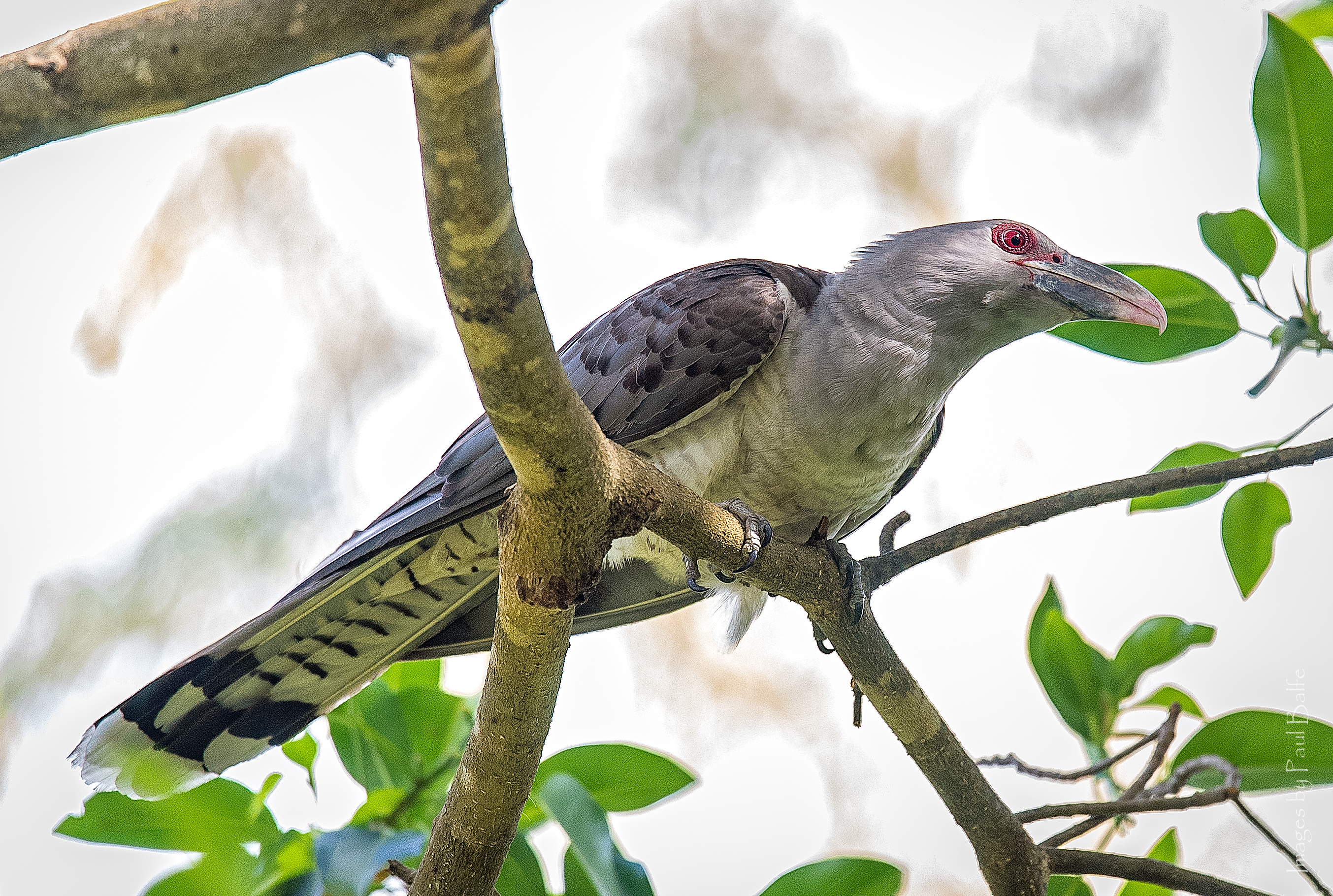
- Channel-billed cuckoo in a fig tree

Conservation status
- Least Concern (IUCN 3.1)

Scientific classification
- Kingdom: Animalia
- Phylum: Chordata
- Class: Aves
- Order: Cuculiformes
- Family: Cuculidae
- Genus: Scythrops; Latham, 1790
- Species: S. novaehollandiae

Binomial name
- Scythrops novaehollandiae Latham, 1790

Synonyms
- Scythrops psittaceus Kerr, R. 1792; Scythrops australasiae Shaw, 1812; Scythrops australis Swainson, 1837; Cuculus praesagus Bonaparte, 1850

= Channel-billed cuckoo =

Species of bird

The channel-billed cuckoo (Scythrops novaehollandiae) is a species of cuckoo in the family Cuculidae. It is monotypic within the genus Scythrops. The species is the largest brood parasite in the world, and the largest cuckoo.

It is found in Australia, New Guinea and Indonesia; additionally, it is vagrant in New Caledonia and New Zealand. The species is migratory over part of its range. There are three subspecies, one migratory, the other two resident. The species is listed as least concern by the IUCN.

== Taxonomy ==
Captain Arthur Phillip wrote of this (at the time) mysterious bird—calling it the 'psittaceous hornbill'—in his 1789 work The voyage of Governor Phillip to Botany Bay, consulting with ornithologist John Latham and deliberating that it had features of a parrot, hornbill or toucan, though conceding there were no toucans in the region. He gave it the name Scythrops novaehollandiae in 1790. Its generic name is derived from the Ancient Greek skuthro-/σκυθρο- 'angry' or 'sullen', and ops/ωψ 'face', 'eye' or 'countenance'. The specific epithet novaehollandiae means of New Holland, hence Australian. John White, the surgeon-general of the First Fleet to New South Wales, wrote A Journal of a Voyage to New South Wales in 1790, including this bird, which he termed 'anomalous hornbill".

Three subspecies are recognised: the nominate Scythrops novaehollandiae novaehollandiae of Australia, New Guinea and the Moluccas, Scythrops novaehollandiae fordi in Sulawesi, and Scythrops novaehollandiae schoddei in the Bismarck Archipelago.

The only member of the genus Scythrops, the species is most closely related to the long-tailed cuckoo (Urodynamis taitensis), which breeds in New Zealand and winters in the Pacific islands, according to Sorenson and Payne (2005).

"Channel-billed cuckoo" has been designated as the official common name for the species by the International Ornithologists' Union (IOC). Latham gave it the name "channel-bill" after a groove in its upper mandible

== Description ==
The world's largest cuckoo, the channel-billed cuckoo measures between 56–70 cm (22–28 in) long, with a 88–107 cm (35–42 in) wingspan, and weighing between 560–935 g (1.235–2.061 lb). 24 adults were found to have averaged 684 g (1.508 lb) in body mass. According to a manual on avian body masses, another species of cuckoo, the buff-headed coucal, may have a mean body mass some 11% higher than the channel-billed cuckoo. The bill is bi-coloured, with a grey base becoming straw-coloured at the tip. The bill is large slightly curved and reminiscent of the bills of hornbills; in fact, the bird is sometimes erroneously referred to as a hornbill. The plumage of the adult is pale grey on the head, chest, belly and back, becoming paler and barred lower down on the belly. The wings are darker grey with dark tips on the feathers. The tail is dark grey on top and barred underneath with a black band and white tip at the end. The feet and legs are black, and the eye is surrounded by prominent red skin. While most other very large cuckoos are rather terrestrial (i.e. roadrunners or the genus Neomorphus), the channel-billed cuckoo is fairly arboreal and is capable both in trees and on the ground. The channel-billed cuckoo is a strong flier, with a distinctive, almost hawk-like cross-shaped (cruciform) flight silhouette. There is some sexual dimorphism in both plumage and dimensions, the female having a smaller bill and paler, more barred undersides.

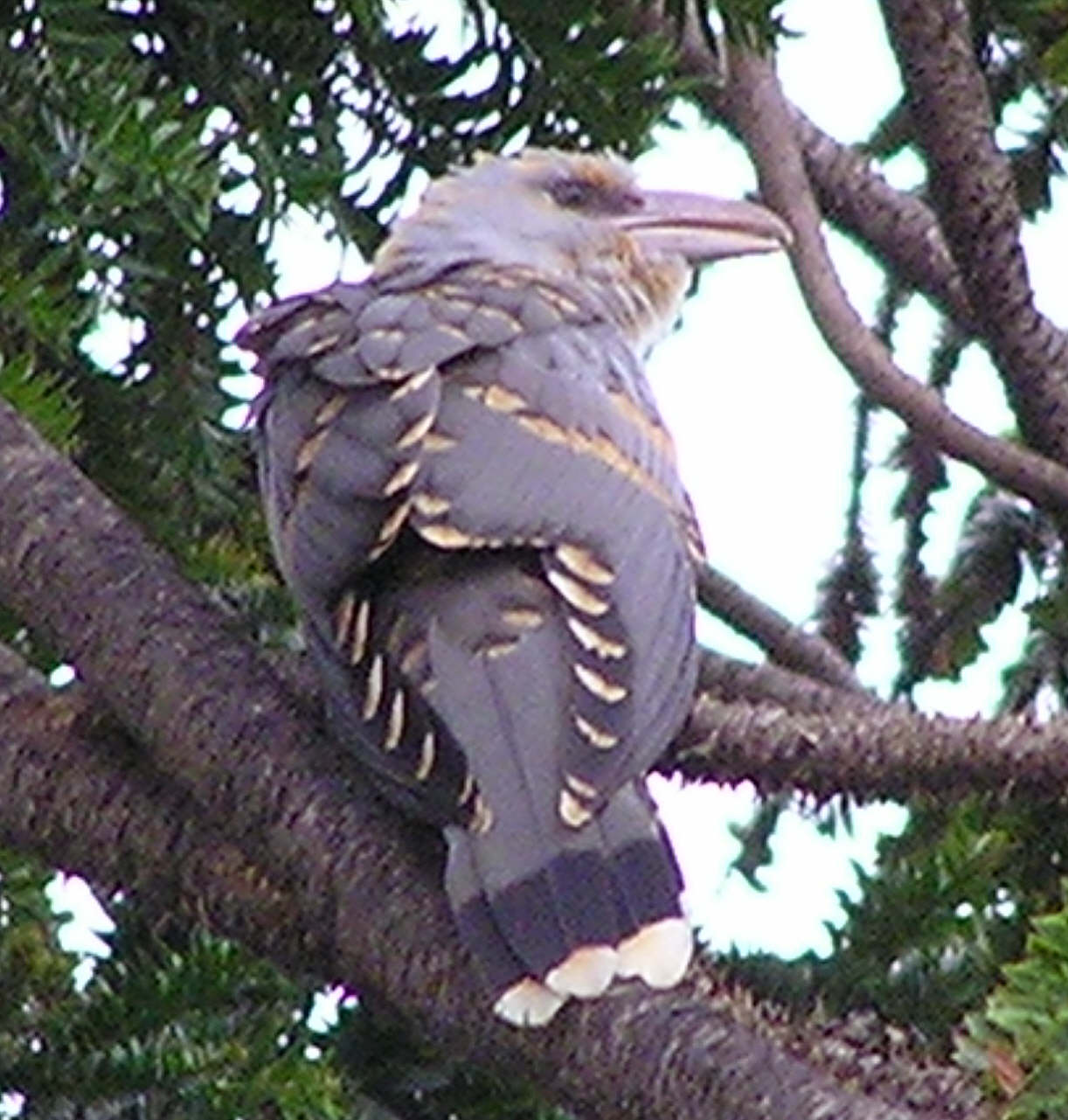
A juvenile, displaying the pale tipped feathers on the wings. In adults the tips are dark.

The juvenile is similar to the adult but has pale tips to the feathers of the wings, and the rest of the plumage is buff instead of pale grey. The bill is less massive and dirty pink in colour, and the skin around the eye is not red.

== Distribution and habitat ==
The channel-billed cuckoo has a widespread distribution across northern and eastern Australia, New Guinea, the Bismarck Archipelago, and the islands of eastern Indonesia as far west as Sulawesi. The species is a permanent resident in the Bismarck Archipelago, Flores and Sulawesi. Elsewhere within its range it is migratory. Birds breeding in Australia range from north eastern Western Australia through the Northern Territory and Queensland down into eastern New South Wales as far as Sydney. In recent years, the breeding range of these cuckoos appears to have extended further down the south coast of NSW. A few stragglers reach the eastern tip of Victoria, but are not thought to breed there. Vagrant birds have reached New Zealand and New Caledonia.

After the breeding season, in March and April, birds breeding in Australia begin to migrate northwards to their wintering grounds in New Guinea and Indonesia. Birds breeding in New South Wales begin leaving earlier, in February and March. The migration route is across the Torres Strait, travelling individually or in small groups. From New Guinea they migrate across the nearby islands as far as Timor and the Moluccas. It is not known if the species breeds in New Guinea, as some birds are present there all year. Migrating channel-billed cuckoos begin to return to Australia in August and September.

== Behaviour ==
The channel-billed cuckoo is often shy, remaining hidden in tree canopies feeding on fruit and most active in early morning and evening. Its loud raucous call makes it more often heard than seen. Other birds such as crows harass and chase it when they encounter it. Miner birds and crows and some other species also swoop them.

=== Breeding ===
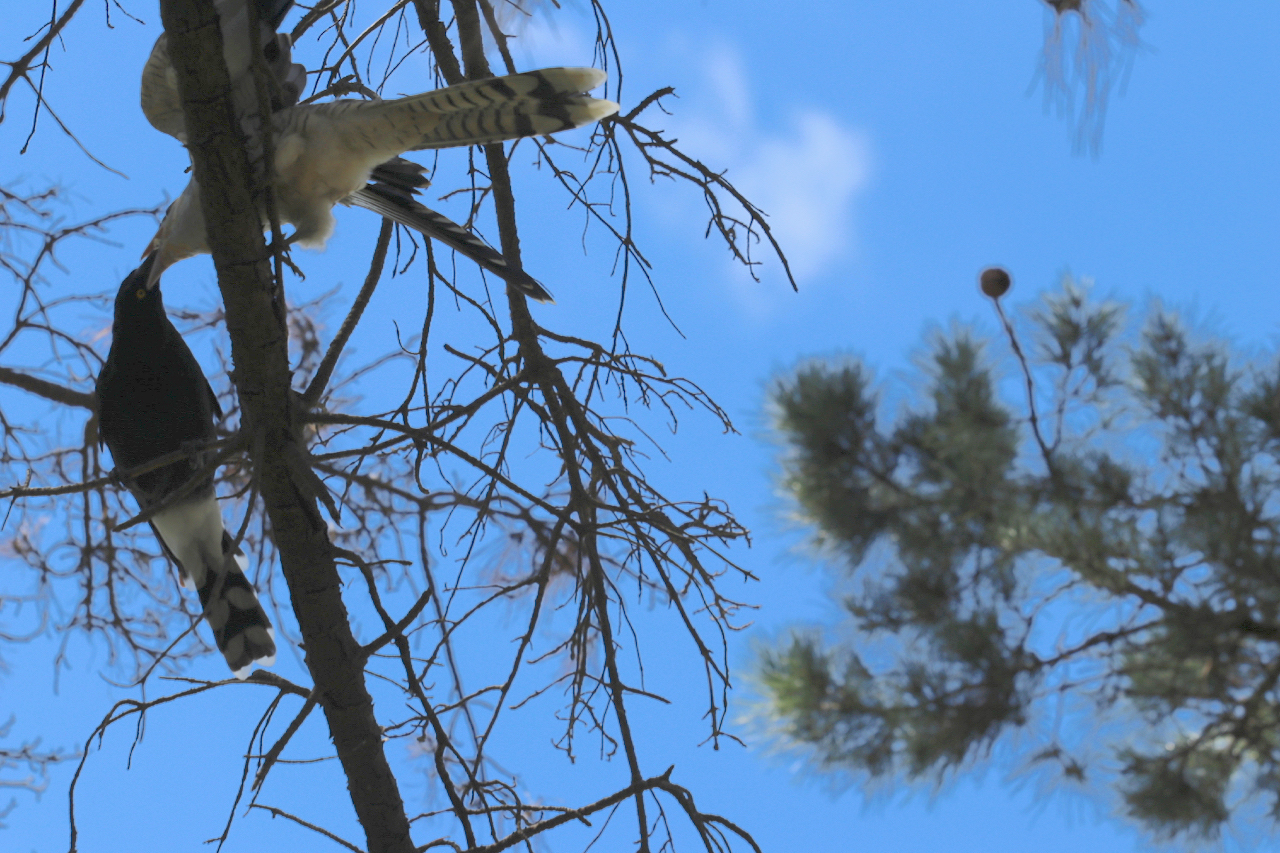
Channel-billed cuckoo juvenile being fed by the pied currawong (Strepera graculina) that raised it.

Channel-billed cuckoos are brood parasites; instead of raising their own young, they lay eggs in the nests of other birds. They are thought to form pair bonds for the duration of a breeding season. Their mating behaviour has been described as involving calling and gift-giving, with the male presenting items of food such as insects to the female. Pairs also work together in order to aid the laying of eggs in host nests; the male will fly over the nest in order to provoke the nest occupants into a mobbing response, whereupon the female will slip into the nest and lay an egg. Alternatively the pair may work together by attacking an incubating bird, driving it off the nest and allowing the female to lay.

The host species varies depending on the location; the most commonly targeted hosts are ravens, currawongs, butcherbirds and Australian magpies. Several eggs can be laid in a single nest, sometimes by different females. Often resembling those of currawongs and magpies (but not ravens), the eggs vary in colour and pattern, measuring 48 x 32 mm. They can be a reddish- or yellowish-brown to dull white, with darker brown splotches. The incubation period for this species is unknown. Upon hatching the chicks are altricial, being blind and naked. Unlike many other cuckoos, the chicks of the channel-billed cuckoo do not eject the other host eggs upon hatching or kill the host's chicks, but these seldom survive as the cuckoo chick is able to monopolise the supply of food. The chicks are fully feathered within four weeks, and leave the nest to clamber about on the branches, although chicks are fed for a number of weeks by the host parents after fledging.

=== Diet ===
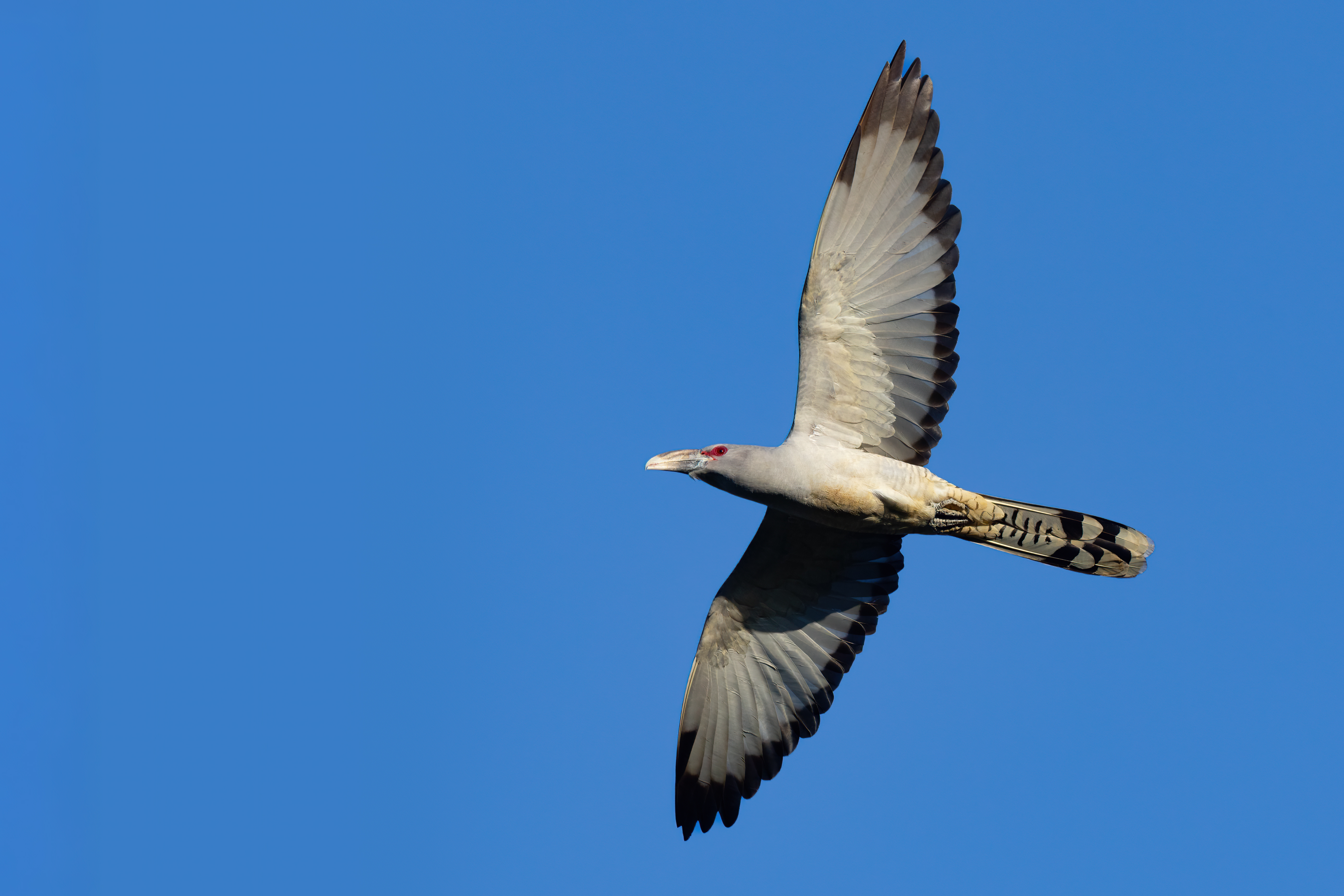
The channel-billed cuckoo's distinctive cross-shaped silhouette in flight

Unusually for cuckoos, which generally take insect prey, but like the closely related koels, fruit forms a major part of the diet of channel-billed cuckoos. Fruits taken include those of several species of Ficus, including Moreton Bay fig (F. macrophylla), Port Jackson fig (F. rubiginosa), cluster fig (F. racemosa), strangler fig (F. watkinsiana) and sweet sandpaper fig (F. opposita), the fruits of trees in the mistletoe family Loranthaceae as well as the fruits of the introduced black mulberry (Morus nigra). Also taken are insects, including beetles, butterflies and grasshoppers, and the nestlings and eggs of birds, including apostlebirds, magpie-larks and noisy miners. Birds typically feed in the canopy of large trees, sometimes in groups and occasionally with other fruit eating birds such as Australasian figbirds and cuckoo-shrikes.

== Relationship with humans ==
Channel-billed cuckoo juvenile being fed by the pied currawong (Strepera graculina) that raised it.

In northern Australia their migration coincides with the beginning of the rainy season, leading to the species being given a range of colloquial names such as storm-bird, flood-bird or rain-bird. The frugivorous habits of the species, coupled with its raptor-like appearance, have also resulted in it being known as the fig hawk.

The channel-billed cuckoo is not considered threatened by human activities, and as such is listed as least concern by the IUCN. In fact, it has benefited from human activities; along with the Australian koel its numbers have increased in some parts of its range due to increases in host species caused by extensive planting of gardens around Australian cities.

== Cited texts ==
- Higgins, P.J. (1999). Handbook of Australian, New Zealand and Antarctic Birds. Volume 4: Parrots to Dollarbird. Melbourne, Victoria: Oxford University Press. ISBN 978-0-19-553071-1.
- Payne, Robert B. (2005). The Cuckoos. Oxford: Oxford University Press. ISBN 978-0-19-850213-5.
