= Flora and fauna of Karachi =

The flora and fauna of Karachi, Sindh, Pakistan.

Flora is the plant life occurring in a particular region or time, generally the naturally occurring or indigenous—native plant life. The corresponding term for animal life is fauna. Flora, fauna and other forms of life such as fungi are collectively referred to as biota. Bacterial organisms, algae, and other organisms are sometimes referred to as flora, so that for example the terms bacterial flora and plant flora are used separately.

Fauna is all of the animal life of any particular region or time. The corresponding term for plants is flora. Flora, fauna and other forms of life such as fungi are collectively referred to as biota.

== Avifauna ==
1. Pied cuckoo - papiya, Chatak, Shah bulbul
2. Pitta - navrang, shumchala
3. Koel - kokila
4. Cattle egret - gochandi khao, doria bgala
5. Peafowl - mayur, mor
6. Baya weaver - baya, son-chiti
7. Oriental dwarf kingfisher - meni ponman
8. Bulbul - kamera bulbul, pahari bulbul
9. Magpie robin - dominga, shaiyar
10. Coppersmith - kathhora, chota basant, tambat

Also crows, pigeons, doves, sparrows, parrots, hawks, eagles and seagulls.
