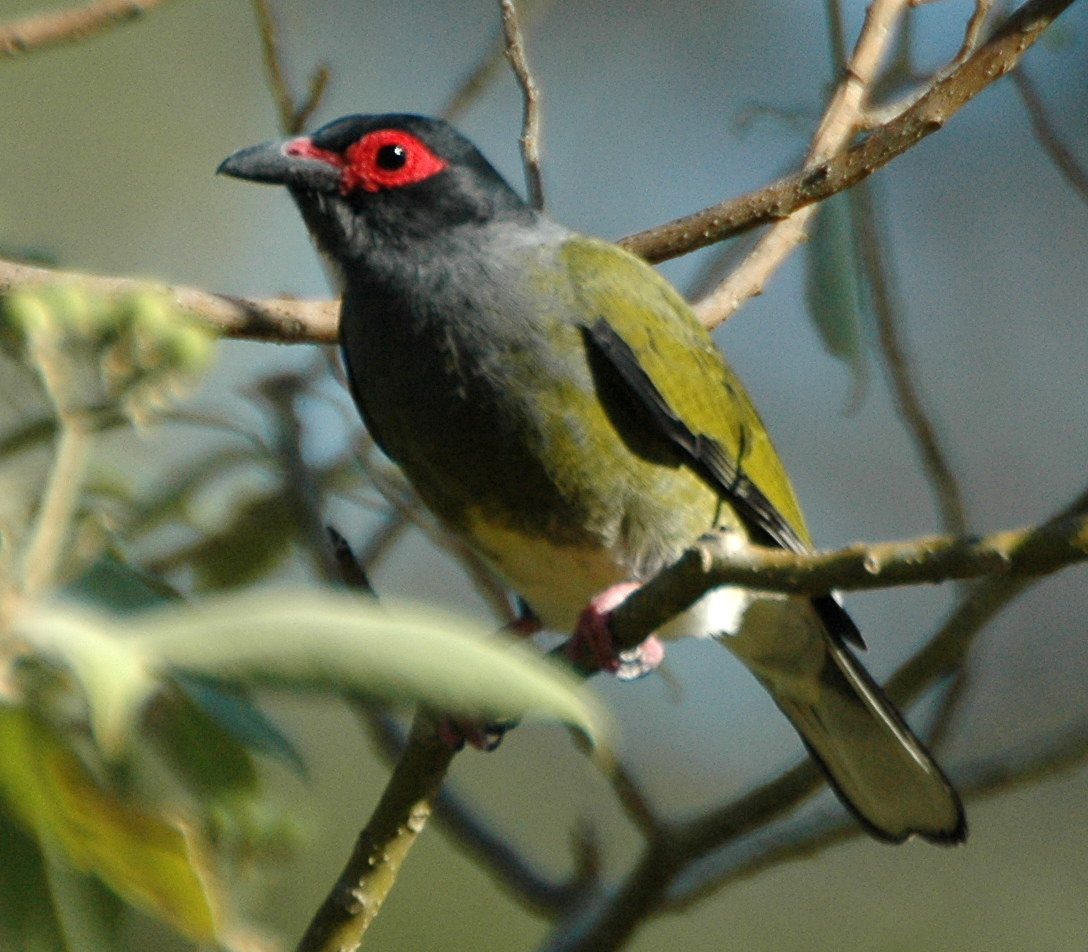
- Australasian figbird (Sphecotheres vieilloti)

Scientific classification
- Kingdom: Animalia
- Phylum: Chordata
- Class: Aves
- Order: Passeriformes
- Family: Oriolidae
- Genus: Sphecotheres; Vieillot, 1816

Type species
- Sphecotheres viridis Vieillot, 1816

Species
- See text

Synonyms
- Picnorhamphus Rosenberg, 1867; Sphecotera

= Figbird =

Genus of birds

The figbirds are a genus (Sphecotheres) in the family of Old World orioles found in wooded habitats in Australia, New Guinea, and the Lesser Sundas.

== Taxonomy and systematics ==
Formerly, the three species have been considered conspecific, but all major authorities now consider them as separate species. The split is primarily based on differences in measurements, plumage, and biogeography.

=== Species ===
Three species are recognized:

Image	Common name	Scientific name	Distribution
	Green figbird	Sphecotheres viridis	Indonesian islands of Roti and Timor
	Wetar figbird	Sphecotheres hypoleucus	Indonesian island of Wetar
	Australasian figbird	Sphecotheres vieilloti	northern and eastern Australia, southern New Guinea, and the Kai Islands

== Description ==
They are strongly sexually dimorphic, with males having olive-green upperparts, a black head, and (uniquely for the family) distinct bright red facial skin. Females are drab-coloured, being dull brownish above, and white below with strong dark streaking. They have greyish facial skin, and a greyish-black bill.

== Behaviour and ecology ==
Compared to the "typical" Old World orioles of the genus Oriolus, the figbirds are more frugivorous (though they also take some small insects, nectar, and seeds) and gregarious, even breeding in small, loose colonies (at least for the Australasian figbird; the nesting habits are still unknown for the other two species).
