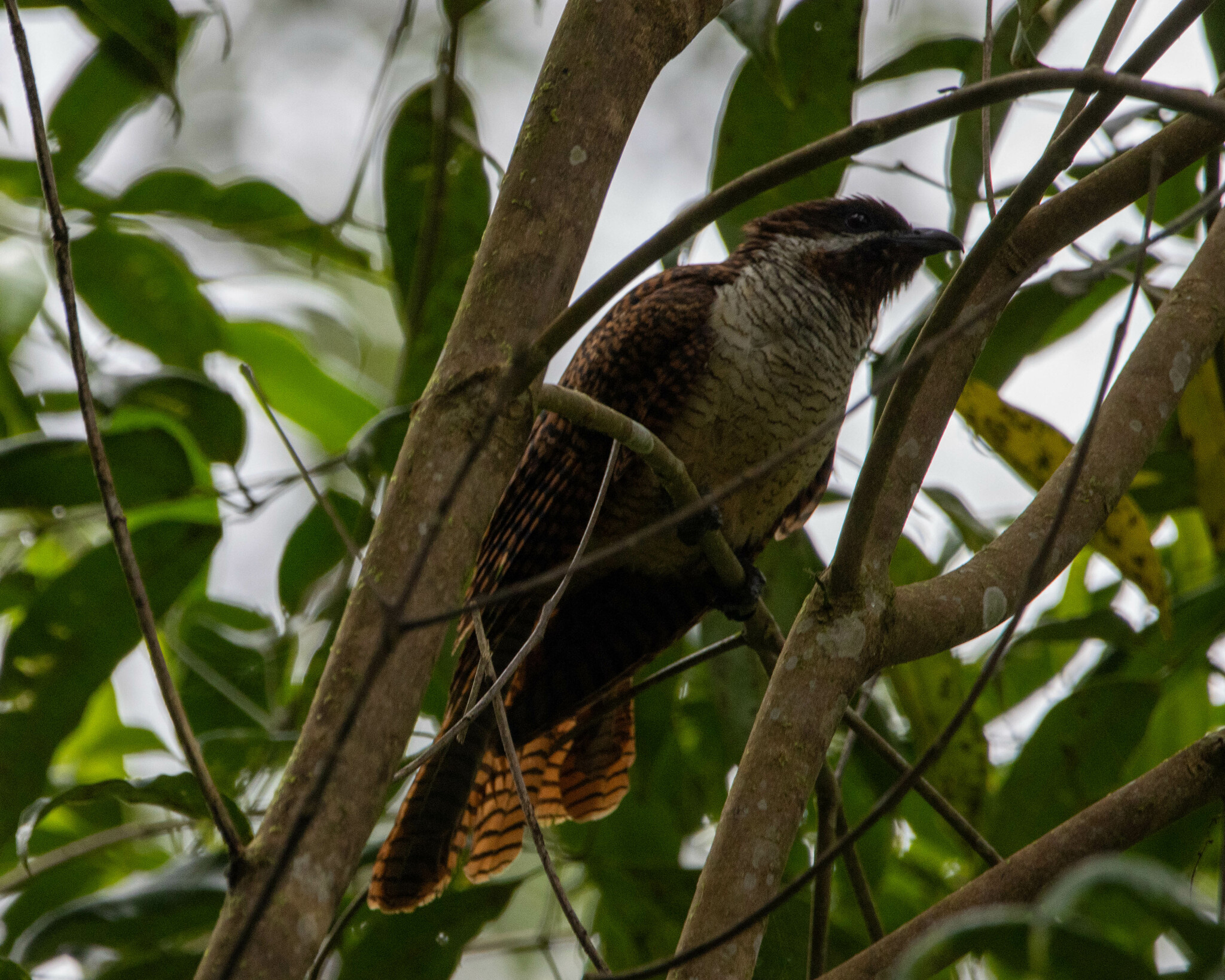
- Female
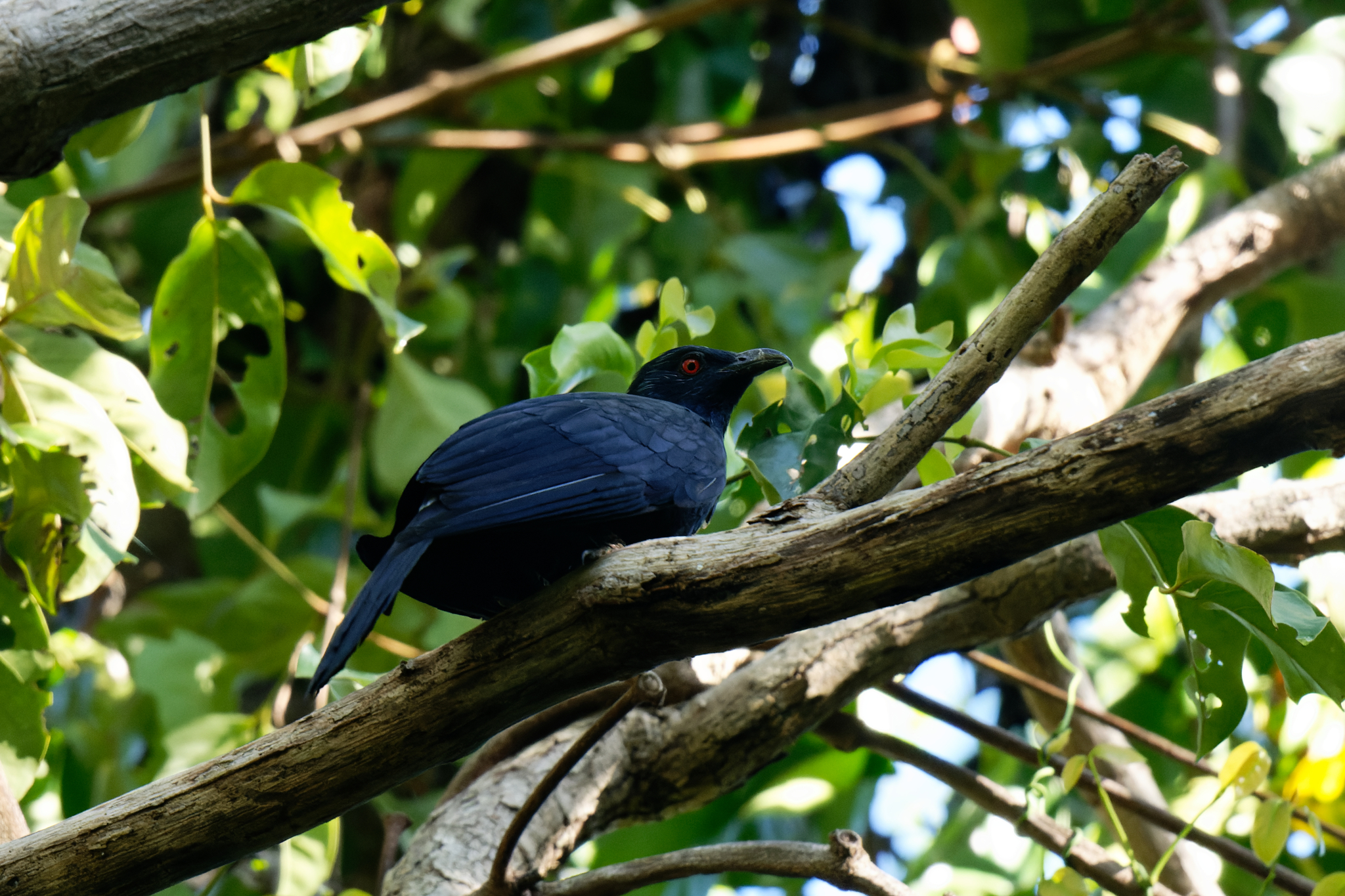
- Male

Conservation status
- Least Concern (IUCN 3.1)

Scientific classification
- Kingdom: Animalia
- Phylum: Chordata
- Class: Aves
- Order: Cuculiformes
- Family: Cuculidae
- Genus: Eudynamys
- Species: E. melanorhynchus

Binomial name
- Eudynamys melanorhynchus Müller, 1843

Synonyms
- Eudynamys melanorhyncha

= Black-billed koel =

Species of bird

The black-billed koel (Eudynamys melanorhynchus) is a species of cuckoo in the family Cuculidae. It is endemic to forest and woodland on the Indonesian islands of Sulawesi, Sula, Banggai, Togian and other smaller nearby islands. It has often been considered conspecific with E. scolopaceus, but they are increasingly treated as separate species. Unlike the black-billed koel, all other members of the common koel complex have a pale bill. The black billed koel voice a typical "koel!" call, or a short series of rising and falling "woo" notes.

The IUCN regards E. melanorhynchus as a synonym of E. orientalis, whereas the International Ornithologists' Union regards it as a valid species.
