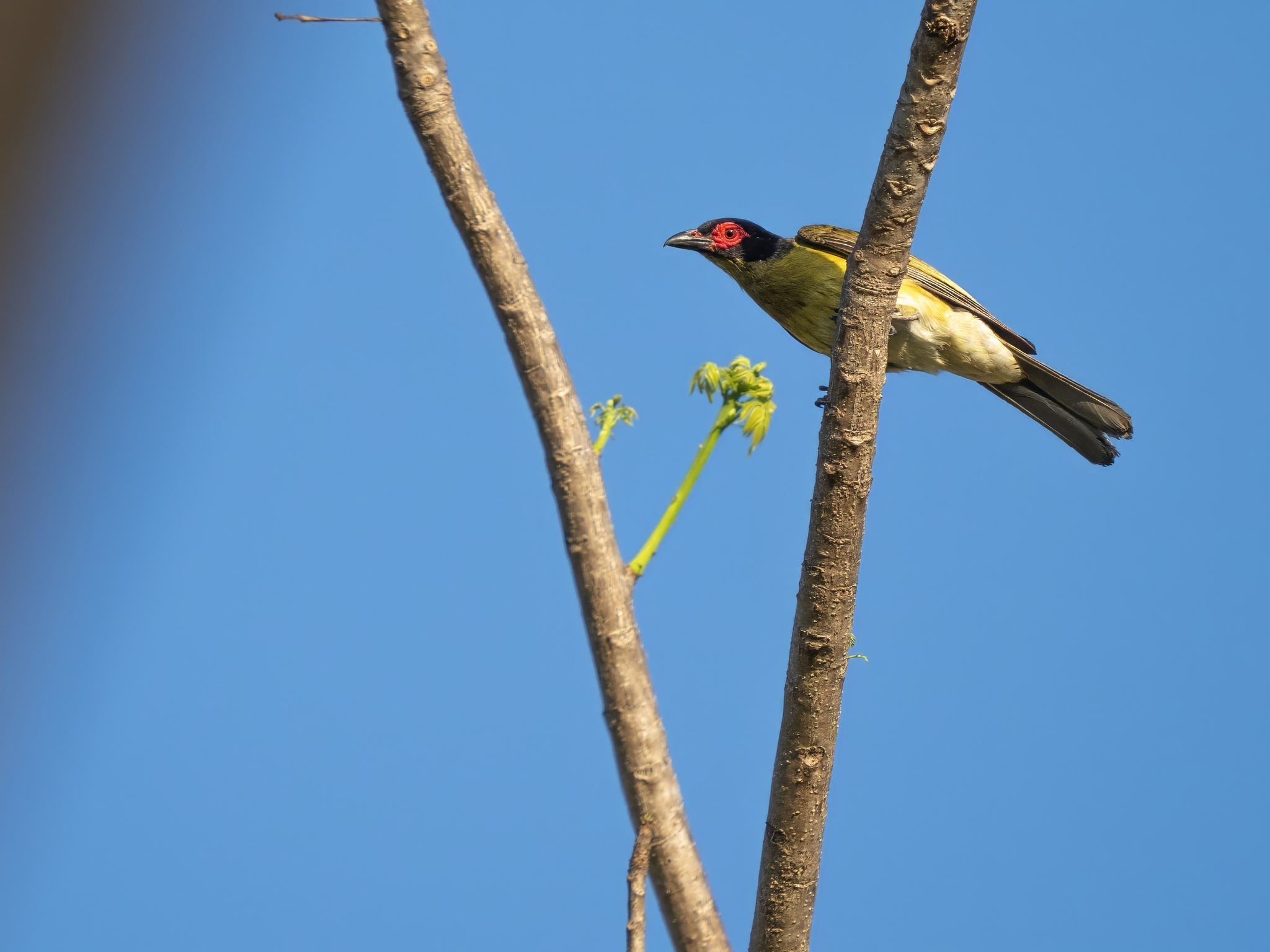

Conservation status
- Least Concern (IUCN 3.1)

Scientific classification
- Kingdom: Animalia
- Phylum: Chordata
- Class: Aves
- Order: Passeriformes
- Family: Oriolidae
- Genus: Sphecotheres
- Species: S. viridis

Binomial name
- Sphecotheres viridis Vieillot, 1816

Synonyms
- Oriolus viridis; Sphecotera viridis

= Green figbird =

Species of bird

The green figbird or Timor figbird (Sphecotheres viridis) is a species of bird in the family Oriolidae. It is endemic to forest, woodland, mangrove, and scrub on the Indonesian islands of Rote and Timor. It is moderately common, so is considered to be of least concern by BirdLife International and the IUCN.

== Taxonomy and systematics ==
Formerly, some authorities have classified the green figbird in the genus Oriolus. It has sometimes included the two other figbirds as subspecies, in which case the combined species simply was known as "figbird", but today, all major authorities consider them as separate species.

== Description ==
It resembles the more widespread Australian figbird, but is smaller, and except for the paler crissum (around the cloaca), the male is entirely yellow-olive below (including the throat).
