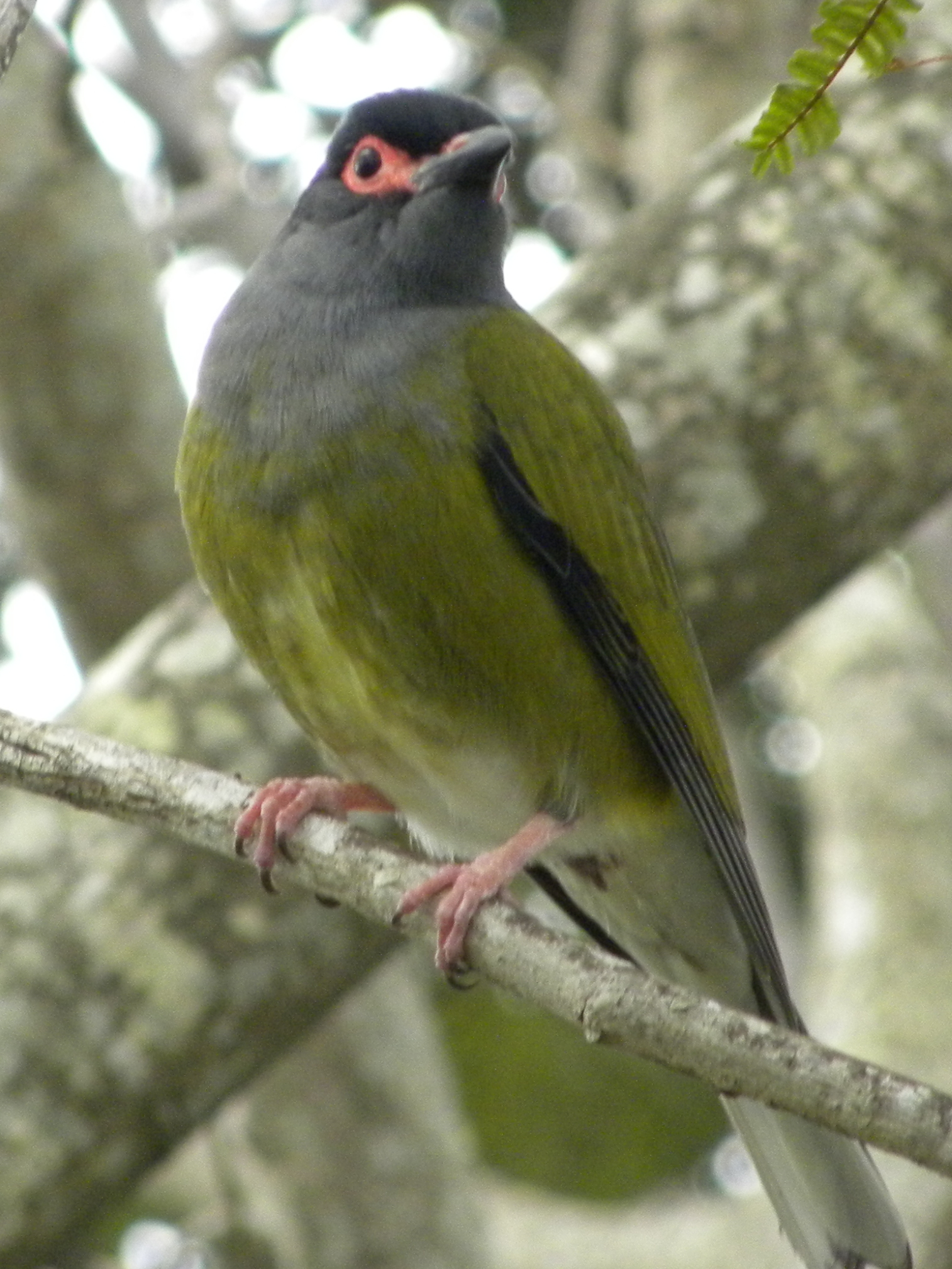

Conservation status
- Least Concern (IUCN 3.1)

Scientific classification
- Kingdom: Animalia
- Phylum: Chordata
- Class: Aves
- Order: Passeriformes
- Family: Oriolidae
- Genus: Sphecotheres
- Species: S. vieilloti

Binomial name
- Sphecotheres vieilloti Vigors & Horsfield, 1827

Synonyms
- Oriolus viridis vieilloti; Sphecotheres viridis vieilloti

= Australasian figbird =

Species of bird in the family Oriolidae

The Australasian figbird (Sphecotheres vieilloti), also known as the green figbird (not to be confused with the Timor figbird), is a conspicuous, medium-sized passerine bird native to a wide range of wooded habitats in northern and eastern Australia, southern New Guinea, and the Kai Islands. It is common in large parts of its range, and occurs in numerous protected areas. Consequently, it is rated as least concern by BirdLife International and the IUCN.

== Taxonomy and systematics ==
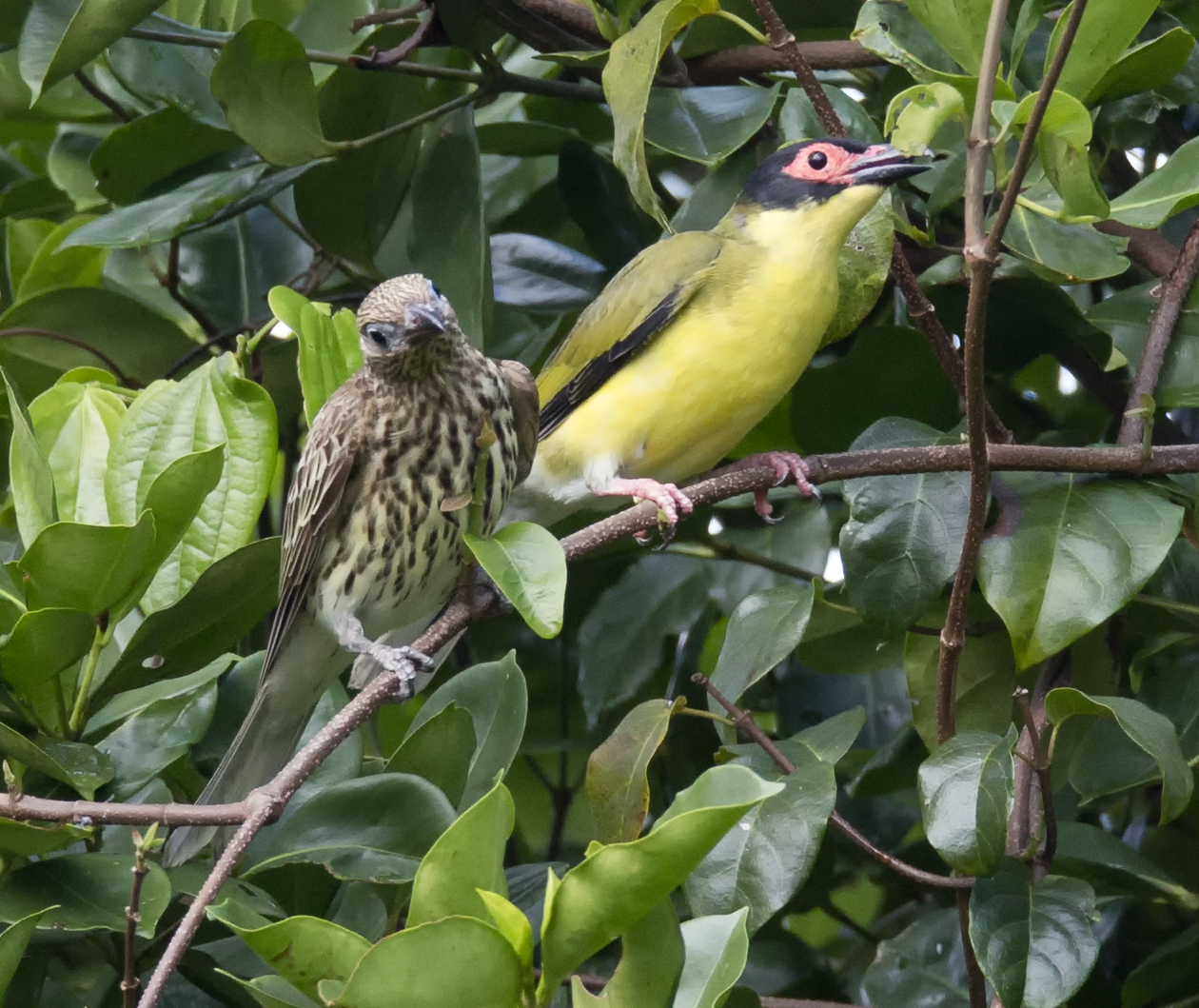
A pair in Queensland, Australia (female on left; yellow variant on right)

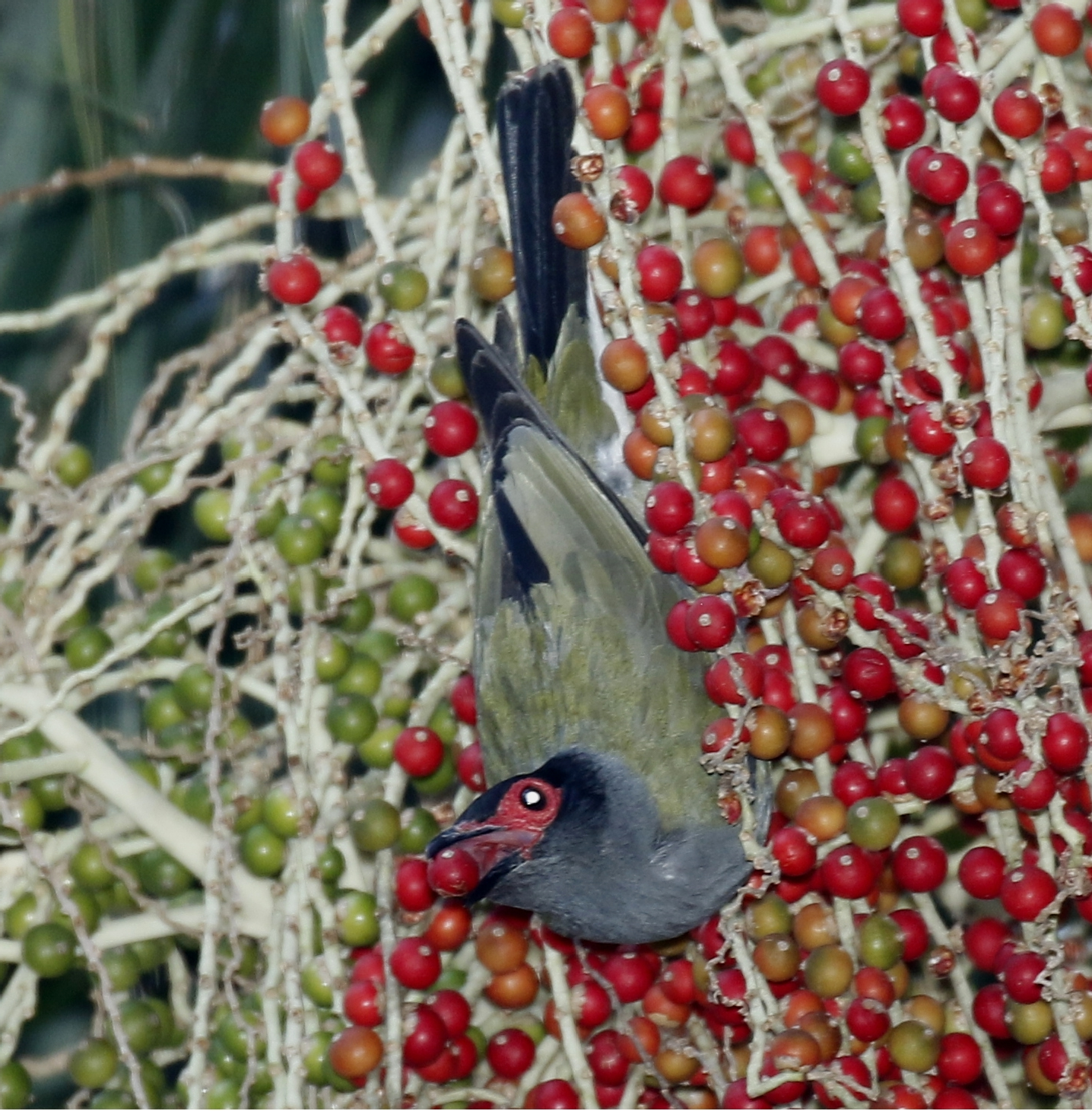
Green variant - City Botanic Gardens - Brisbane, Australia

Formerly, the Australasian figbird was considered as a subspecies of the green figbird and referred to as simply the figbird, a name still commonly used in Australia, where the Australasian figbird is the only figbird present. The Australasian figbird was split from the green figbird primarily based on differences in measurements, plumage, and biogeography. Additionally, the Australasian figbird has sometimes been split into two separate species, the more northern, yellow figbird (S. flaviventris) and the green or southern figbird (S. vieilloti), but the two intergrade widely where they come into contact, supporting the view that they are part of a single biological species.

=== Subspecies ===
Five subspecies are recognized:

- S. v. salvadorii – Sharpe, 1877: Originally described as a separate species. Found in south-eastern New Guinea
- S. v. cucullatus – (Rosenberg, HKB, 1866): Originally described as a separate species. Found on Kai Islands (off south-western New Guinea). Possibly a junior synonym of S. v. flaviventris
- S. v. ashbyi – Mathews, 1912: Found in northern Western Australia and Northern Territory, Australia
- Yellow figbird (S. v. flaviventris) – Gould, 1850: Originally described as a separate species. Alternatively named the northern figbird. Found in north-eastern Australia and Torres Strait Islands
- S. v. vieilloti – Vigors & Horsfield, 1827: Found in eastern Australia

== Description ==
The Australasian figbird has a total length of 27.0–29.5 cm (10.6–11.6 in) and a jizz comparable to that of other orioles. With a body mass of around 111 to 130 g (3.9 to 4.6 oz), it is probably the largest of the Old World orioles. It is sexually dimorphic, and the racial differences are almost entirely limited to the male. Males of all subspecies have a black tail with broad white tips to the outer rectrices, white crissum (the undertail coverts surrounding the cloaca), blackish primaries, a black head, distinct bright red facial skin, a black bill with a red base, and pinkish legs. In the nominate subspecies, the body is largely olive-green, and the throat, neck and chest are grey. The subspecies cucullatus, ashbyi and flaviventris are yellowish olive-green above, and bright yellow below (including the throat). The last subspecies, salvadorii, resembles previous, but with a grey throat, collar and chest similar to the nominate subspecies, thereby giving it an intermediate appearance not unlike some hybrids between the nominate and flaviventris subspecies in Australia.

Females are drab-coloured, being dull brownish above, and white below with strong dark streaking. They have greyish facial skin, and a greyish-black bill. Juveniles resemble females, but the streaking below is typically not as strong. The other orioles in its range, the brown and olive-backed orioles, are superficially similar, but have entirely red bills when adult.

Australasian figbirds make a large number of different short calls, and are also able to mimic the voices of other birds, for example parrots and other species of orioles. The song consists of a series of simple whistles.

== Behaviour and ecology ==
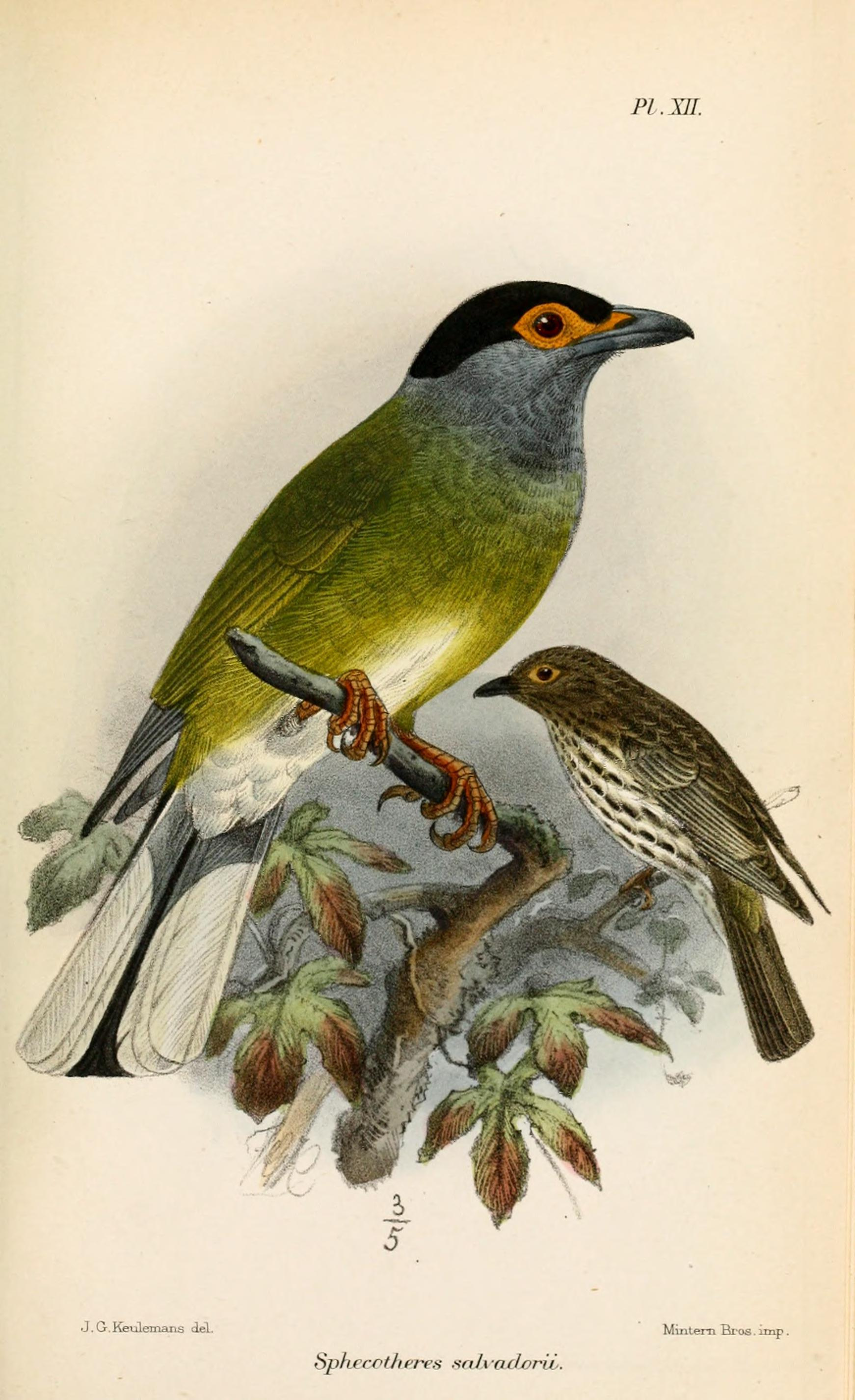
Subspecies S. v. salvadorii, illustration by Keulemans, 1877

As suggested by their name, Australasian figbirds are largely frugivorous, but also take small insects, nectar and small seeds. While largely a resident species (although the southern population may be migratory), it is nomadic in response to the availability of food.

Unlike most orioles, Australasian figbirds are gregarious, often forming flocks of 20 to 40 birds during the nonbreeding season, and even breeding in small, loose colonies. The flimsy, saucer-shaped nest is made from plant material, and usually placed relatively high in a tree. The clutch of two to four eggs is incubated by both sexes, and typically hatches after 16–17 days. It has been recorded nesting near the aggressive spangled drongo and helmeted friarbird, possibly gaining an advantage as they keep potential nest predators away. Australasian figbirds sometimes fall victim to nest parasitism by Pacific koels.

Male at Rush Creek, south-east Queensland, Australia
