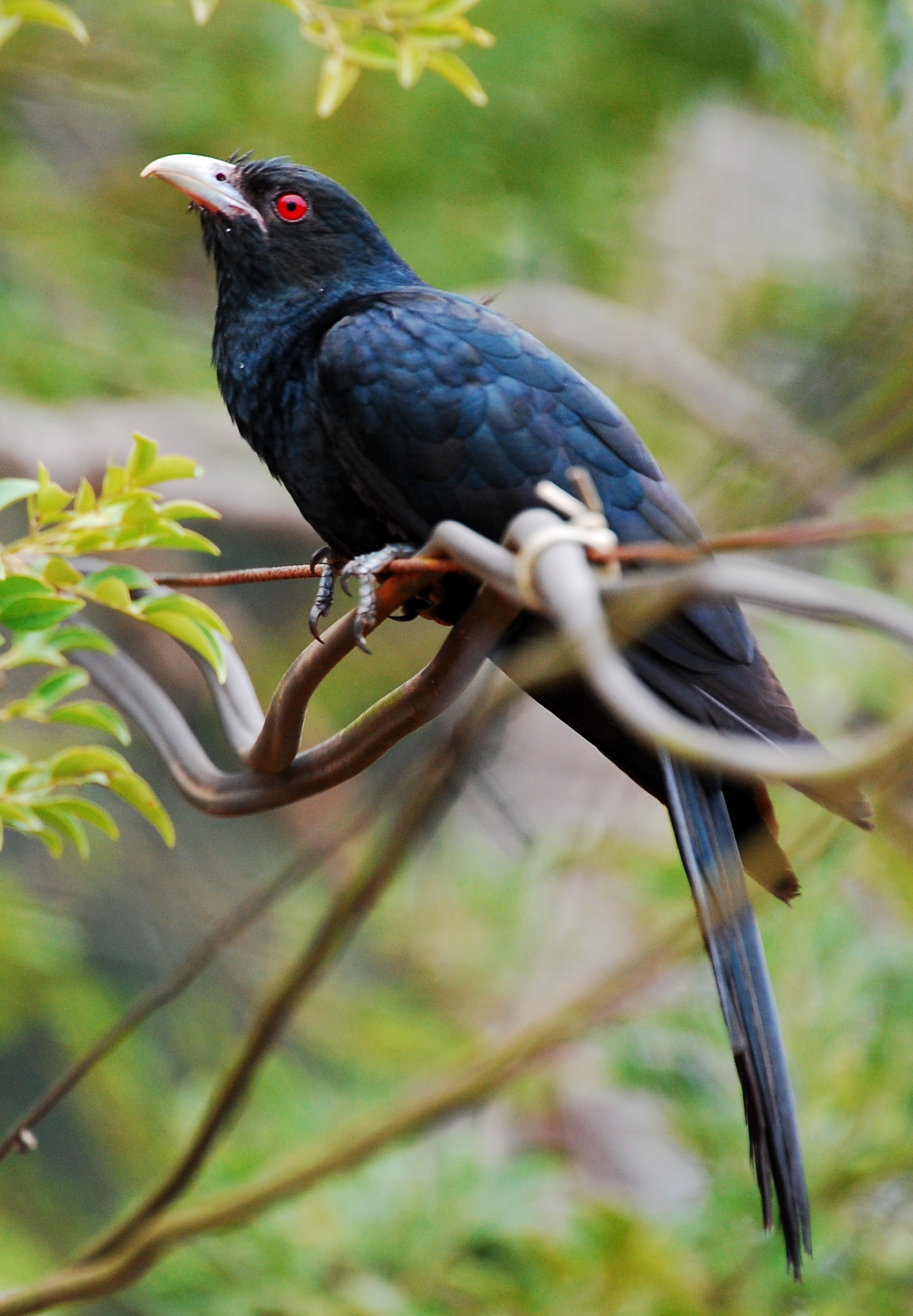
- Male Asian koel
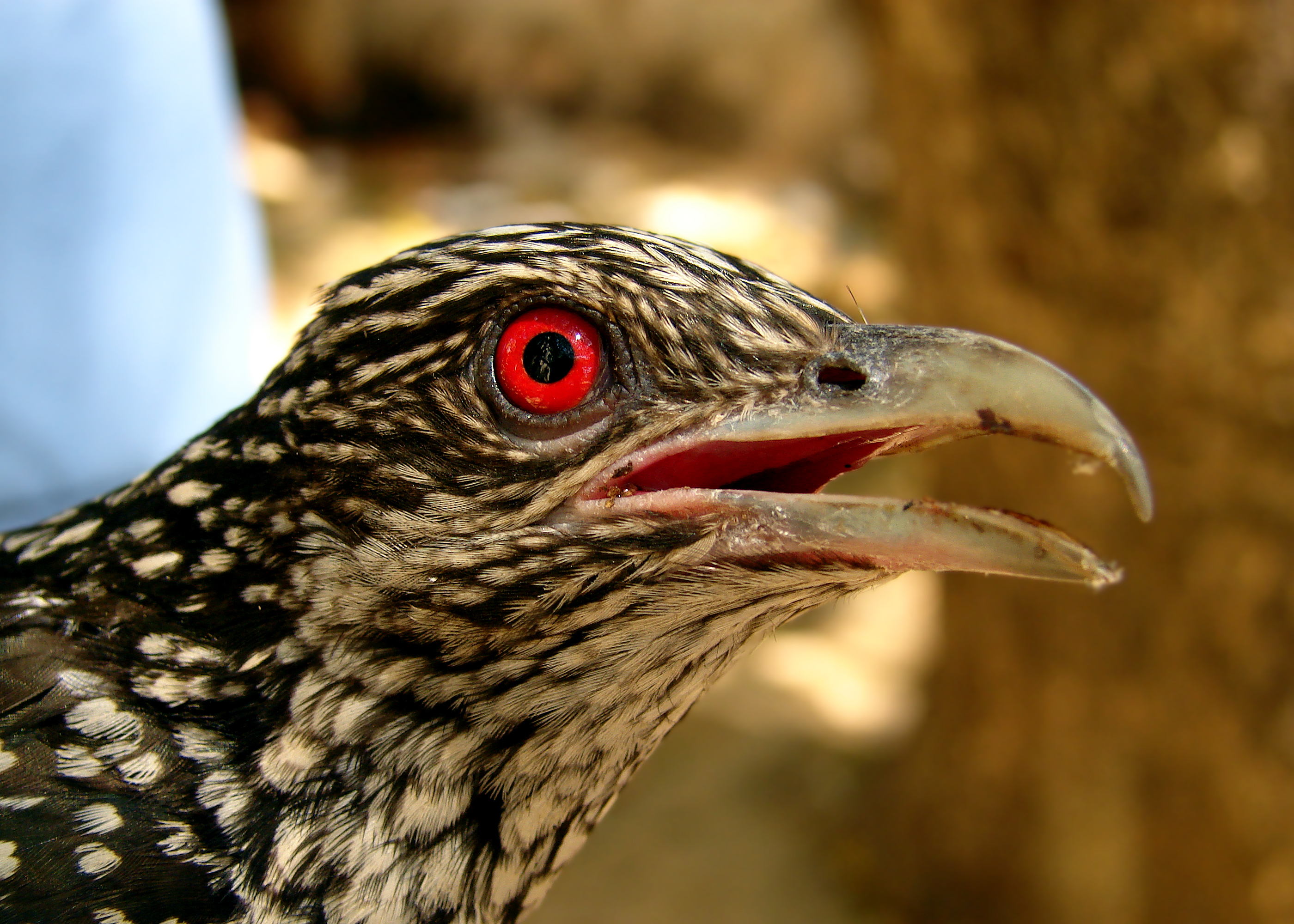
- Female Asian koel

Scientific classification
- Kingdom: Animalia
- Phylum: Chordata
- Class: Aves
- Order: Cuculiformes
- Family: Cuculidae
- Subfamily: Cuculinae
- Genus: Eudynamys; Vigors & Horsfield, 1827

Type species
- Cuculus orientalis (Pacific koel) Linnaeus, 1766

Species
- Eudynamys melanorhynchus Eudynamys scolopaceus Eudynamys orientalis

= Koel =

Genus of birds

The true koels, Eudynamys, are a genus of cuckoos from Asia, Australia and the Pacific. They are large sexually dimorphic cuckoos that eat fruits and insects and have loud distinctive calls. They are brood parasites, laying their eggs in the nests of other species.

== Taxonomy ==
The genus Eudynamys was introduced in 1827 by the English naturalists Nicholas Vigors and Thomas Horsfield. The name combines the Ancient Greek eu meaning "fine" with dunamis meaning "power" or "strength". The type species was designated as the Pacific koel by George Robert Gray in 1840.

A molecular genetic study by Sorenson and Payne (2005) found that the closest relative of Eudynamys is the dwarf koel (Microdynamis parva), and beyond that the thick-billed cuckoo (Pachycoccyx audeberti). They found that the long-tailed cuckoo (Urodynamis taitensis) of New Zealand and the Pacific, which had earlier been placed in Eudynamys as E. taitensis and sometimes called the long-tailed koel, was more distantly related, along with other members of the tribe Cuculini, including the white-crowned cuckoo (Cacomantis leucolophus), also known as the white-crowned koel. However, not all the evidence for the relationships was very strong and further research was required.

=== Species ===
The taxonomy of the common koel complex is difficult and remains a matter of dispute. Some recognize only a single species (common koel, Eudynamys scolopaceus, with melanorhynchus and orientalis as subspecies); some recognize two species (common koel, Eudynamys scolopaceus, with orientalis as a subspecies, and black-billed koel, Eudynamys melanorhynchus); and others recognize three species. Common koel may therefore refer to:

Genus Eudynamys – Vigors & Horsfield, 1827 – three species
Common name	Scientific name and subspecies	Range	Size and ecology	IUCN status and estimated population
Asian koel Male Female	Eudynamys scolopaceus Linnaeus, 1758 Five subspecies: E. s. scolopaceus (Linnaeus, 1758); E. s. chinensis Cabanis and Heine, 1863; E. s. harterti Ingram, C 1912; E. s. malayana Cabanis and Heine, 1863; E. s. mindanensis (Linnaeus, 1766) – (includes E. s. paraguena) (Hachisuka, 1934)	Shown in black: Pakistan, India, Bangladesh and Sri Lanka to southern China, Singapore, Ryukyu Islands in southern Japan and the Greater Sundas	Size: Habitat: Diet:	LC
Black-billed koel	Eudynamys melanorhynchus Müller, 1843	Shown in dark blue: Indonesian islands of Sulawesi, Sula, Banggai, Togian	Size: Habitat: Diet:	LC
Pacific koel Male Female	Eudynamys orientalis (Linnaeus, 1766) Eight subspecies: E. o. orientalis (Linnaeus, 1766); E. o. picatus Müller, S, 1843; E. o. rufiventer (Lesson, RP, 1830) (includes minimus); E. o. hybrida Diamond, 2002; E. o. salvadorii Hartert, EJO, 1900; E. o. alberti Rothschild & Hartert, EJO, 1907; E. o. cyanocephalus (Latham, 1801); E. o. subcyanocephalus Mathews, 1912	Shown in light blue: Wallacea east to the Solomon Islands and south to northern and eastern Australia	Size: Habitat: Diet:	LC

=== Sexual dimorphism ===
The female koel's plumage is banded and speckled in shades of brown. The evolutionary function is to camouflage her approach to her host's nest and enable her brood parasitism to go undetected. Noisy miner and wattle birds have been observed feeding their fledglings. The male's sexually dimorphic plumage is black, like a raven. They are of a similar size to ravens and are known to have territories that overlap with ravens. They have also been observed being mobbed by noisy miners and wattle birds in the same way as ravens (egg predators) are. The male koel may be a raven mimic enabling the female to approach the host's nest, either deliberately or opportunistically, while the host flock is engaged in (distracted) mobbing the male.
