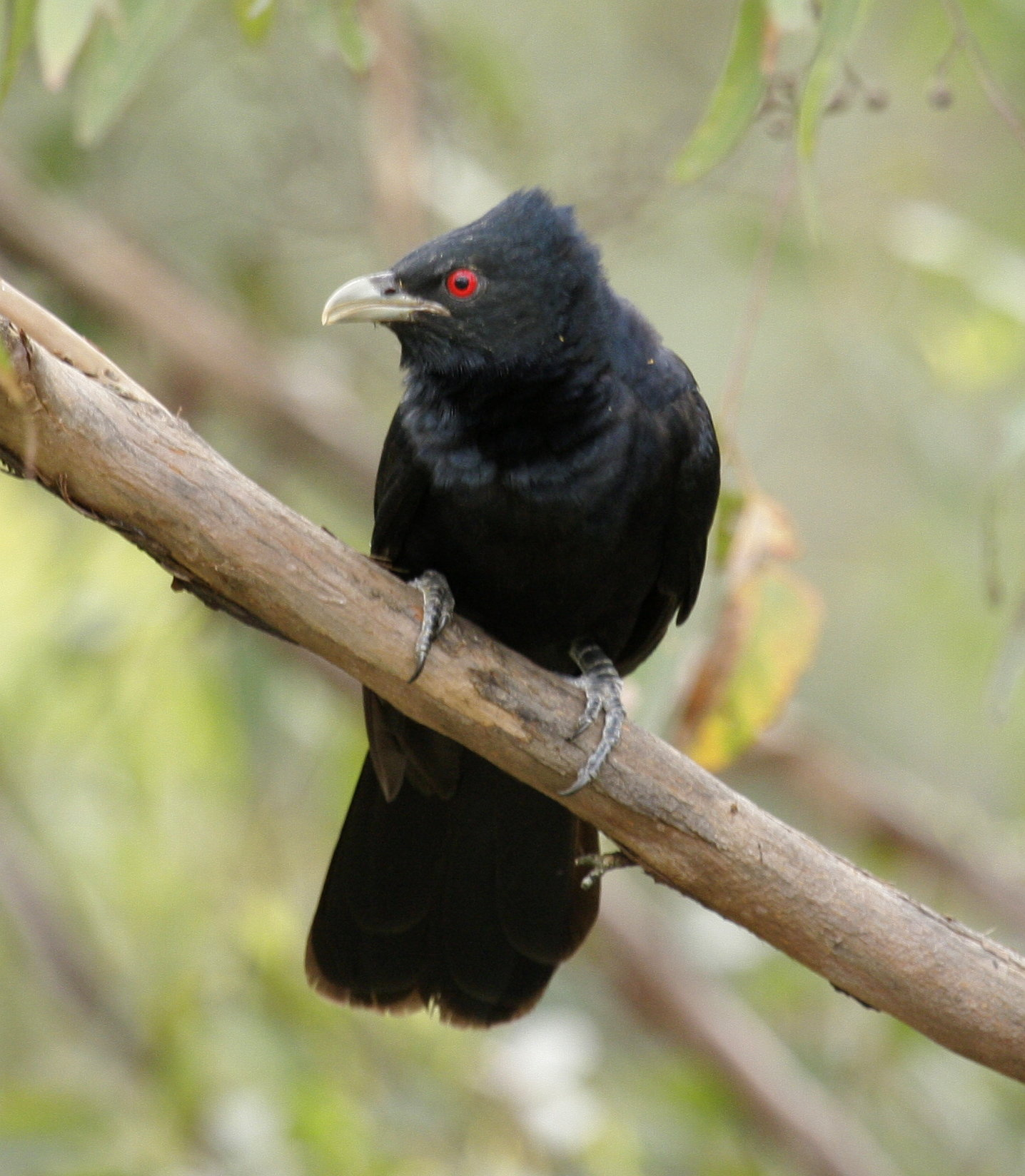
- Male
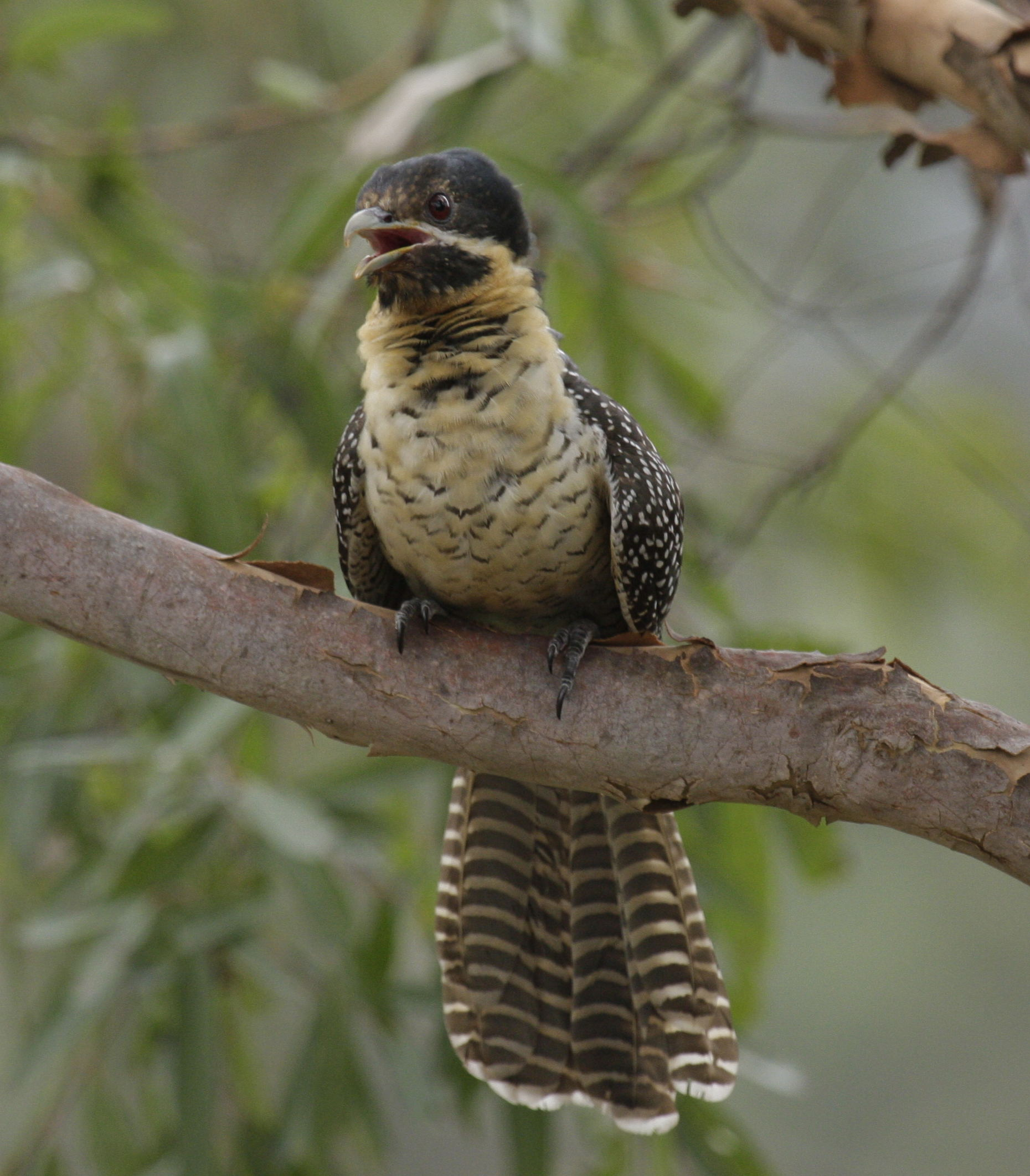
- Female

Conservation status
- Least Concern (IUCN 3.1)

Scientific classification
- Kingdom: Animalia
- Phylum: Chordata
- Class: Aves
- Order: Cuculiformes
- Family: Cuculidae
- Genus: Eudynamys
- Species: E. orientalis

Binomial name
- Eudynamys orientalis (Linnaeus, 1766)
- Distribution of the Pacific koel in turquoise (also outside the map in southeast Australia)

Synonyms
- Cuculus orientalis Linnaeus, 1766

Audio
- Pacific koel call in suburban Adelaide, South Australia

= Pacific koel =

Species of bird

The Pacific koel (Eudynamys orientalis), also known as the eastern koel or formerly common koel, is a species of cuckoo in the family Cuculidae. In northern Australia, it is colloquially known as the rainbird or stormbird.

== Taxonomy ==
The Pacific koel was formally described by Swedish naturalist Carl Linnaeus in 1766 in the 12th edition of his Systema Naturae. He placed it with the cuckoos in the genus Cuculus and coined the binomial name Cuculus orientalis. Linnaeus based his account on the "le Coucou noir des Indes" that had been described and illustrated in 1760 by French zoologist Mathurin Jacques Brisson in his multivolume work Ornithologie. The type locality is Ambon Island, one of the Maluku Islands of Indonesia. The Pacific koel is now placed in the genus Eudynamys that was introduced in 1827 by naturalists Nicholas Vigors and Thomas Horsfield. It was formerly considered to be conspecific with the Asian koel (Eudynamys scolopaceus) and the black-billed koel (Eudynamys melanorhynchus).

Eight subspecies are recognised:

- E. o. orientalis (Linnaeus, 1766) – central Moluccas
- E. o. picatus Müller, S, 1843 – Sumba to Timor (Lesser Sunda Islands) and south Moluccas
- E. o. rufiventer (Lesson, RP, 1830) – New Guinea and west, north satellites (includes minimus)
- E. o. hybrida Diamond, 2002 – Crown, Long and Tolokiwa (west of New Britain) and Credner Islands (east of New Britain, southeast Bismarck Archipelago)
- E. o. salvadorii Hartert, EJO, 1900 – New Ireland, New Britain and satellites (east Bismarck Archipelago)
- E. o. alberti Rothschild & Hartert, EJO, 1907 – Buka to Makira group (Solomon Islands)
- E. o. cyanocephalus (Latham, 1801) – central east Queensland to south New South Wales (central east, southeast Australia)
- E. o. subcyanocephalus Mathews, 1912 – northeast Western Australia to central east Queensland (north Australia)

In Australia, it is also known as the rain bird or stormbird.

== Description ==
The Pacific koel can be identified by its black plumage, often tinted with blue and green, and red eyes. The species is sexually dimorphic; the female has brown plumage along the back with white spots and the underbelly is often cream coloured with fine black stripes. Young birds resemble the female, but have dark eyes.

== Distribution and habitat ==
It is found in forest, woodland, plantations, and gardens from Wallacea east to the Solomon Islands and south to northern and eastern Australia. The Pacific koel has not been rated by IUCN, but the Australian koel (here included in the Pacific koel) is considered to be of least concern.

== Behaviours ==
Pacific koels are a brood parasites. In Australia, their hosts are mainly large honeyeaters (especially noisy friarbirds and red wattlebirds). Unlike in other parasitic cuckoos, the young do not attempt to kill the host chicks. This trait is shared with the channel-billed cuckoo, which – as in the Pacific koel – are largely frugivorous as adults. A study of vocalization noted that the duetting behaviour may indicate the possibility of short-term pair bonding in its otherwise polygynous mating system.

In Australia, the presence of the species is regarded as a sign of the arrival of spring and the rainy season. It is also viewed as a nuisance due to the males' incessant calling throughout the day and night. The calls indicate the start of breeding season, and males call repeatedly to mark their territories or communicate their availability to other females.

== Gallery ==
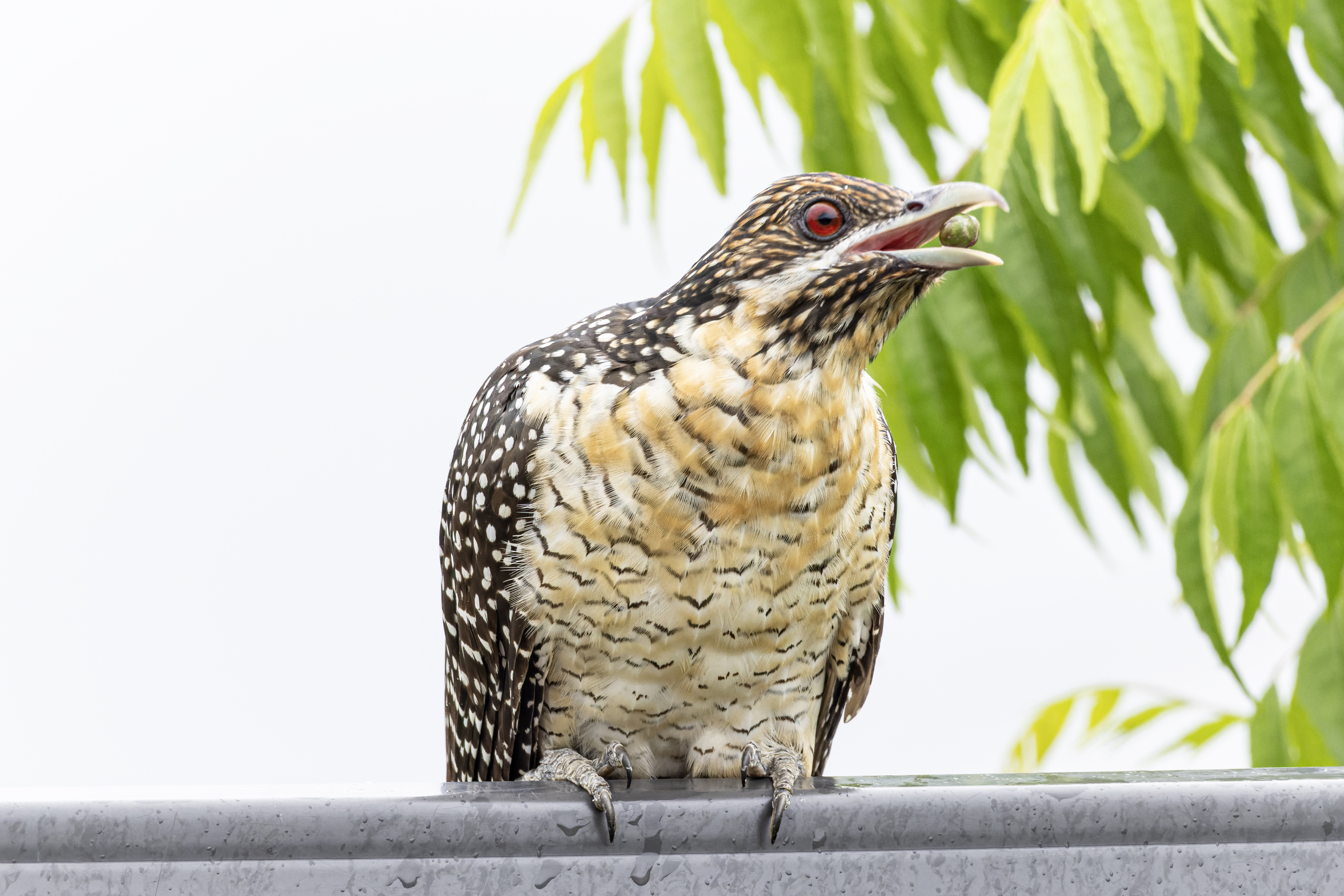
Female Pacific koel having a snack

Female, then male feeding on fruit in southeast Queensland, Australia

Juvenile being fed, Gympie, Queensland, Australia
