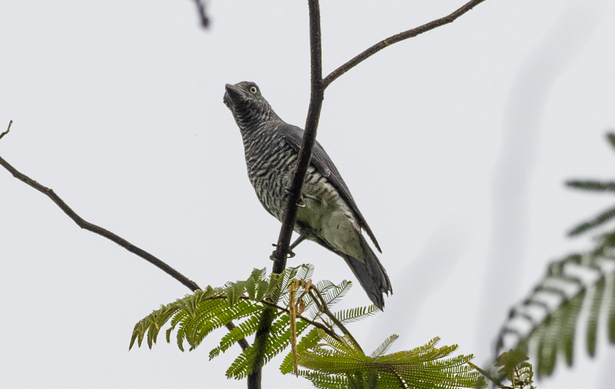
- Female ssp. kochii

Conservation status
- Not evaluated (IUCN 3.1)

Scientific classification
- Kingdom: Animalia
- Phylum: Chordata
- Class: Aves
- Order: Passeriformes
- Family: Campephagidae
- Genus: Coracina
- Species: C. kochii

Binomial name
- Coracina kochii (Kutter, 1882)

= Mindanao cuckooshrike =

Species of bird

The Mindanao cuckooshrike (Coracina kochii) is a passerine bird in the family Campephagidae that is found only in the Philippines on the islands of Bohol, Samar, Leyte, Mindanao and Basilan. The species was formerly considered to be a subspecies of the bar-bellied cuckooshrike.

== Description and taxonomy ==
This species is described as a largecuckooshrike with pale gray eyes, gray upperparts and mantle and a barred belly and rump.. This species exhibits sexual dimorphism in which the male has a black mask and a plainer throat while the female has a striped face and throat. The Mindanao cuckooshrike was formally described in 1882 by the German ornithologist Friedrich Kutter based on specimens collected on the island of Mindanao in the Philippines. He coined the binomial name Graucalus kochii. The specific epithet was chosen to honour the German collector and museum director Gottlieb von Koch (1849–1914). The species was formerly treated as conspecific with the bar-bellied cuckooshrike (Coracina striata) but was promoted to species status based on the differences in morphology and vocalizations.

Two subspecies are recognised:

- C. k. kochii (Kutter, 1882) – Mindanao group (south Philippines)
- C. k. boholensis Rand & Rabor, 1959 – East Visayas (central east Philippines); has heavier barring on rear underparts.

== Ecology and behavior ==
This cuckooshrike usually lives in small groups or in mixed-species foraging flocks with other cuckooshrikes and other species such as the Philippine oriole, Black-bibbed cicadabird and Philippine leafbird.

As a newly split species, not much is known about this species itself but based on information about the Bar-bellied cuckooshrike it is also pressumed to mainly eats insects, including caterpillars, mantises, and dragonflies, and figs. Breeds from April to May. Nest described as a shallow cup of moss, leaves, roots and mud around 20 meters above the ground. Lays 2 pale gray eggs. Only the female has been observed feeding the chicks.

== Habitat and conservation status ==
Its natural habitat is tropical moist lowland and montane forests up to 2,000 meters above sea level. It is typically found in the canopy.

This species has yet to be assessed by the International Union for Conservation of Nature. However, this species is likely declining. This species' main threat is habitat loss with wholesale clearance of forest habitats as a result of logging, agricultural conversion and mining activities occurring within the range. The most affected part of its range is Bohol which only has 4% forest cover remaining.

Occurs in a few protected areas in Rajah Sikatuna Protected Landscape in Bohol and Samar Island Natural Park in Samar, Pasonanca Natural Park and Mount Apo on Mindanao but actual protection and enforcement from illegal logging and hunting are lax.
