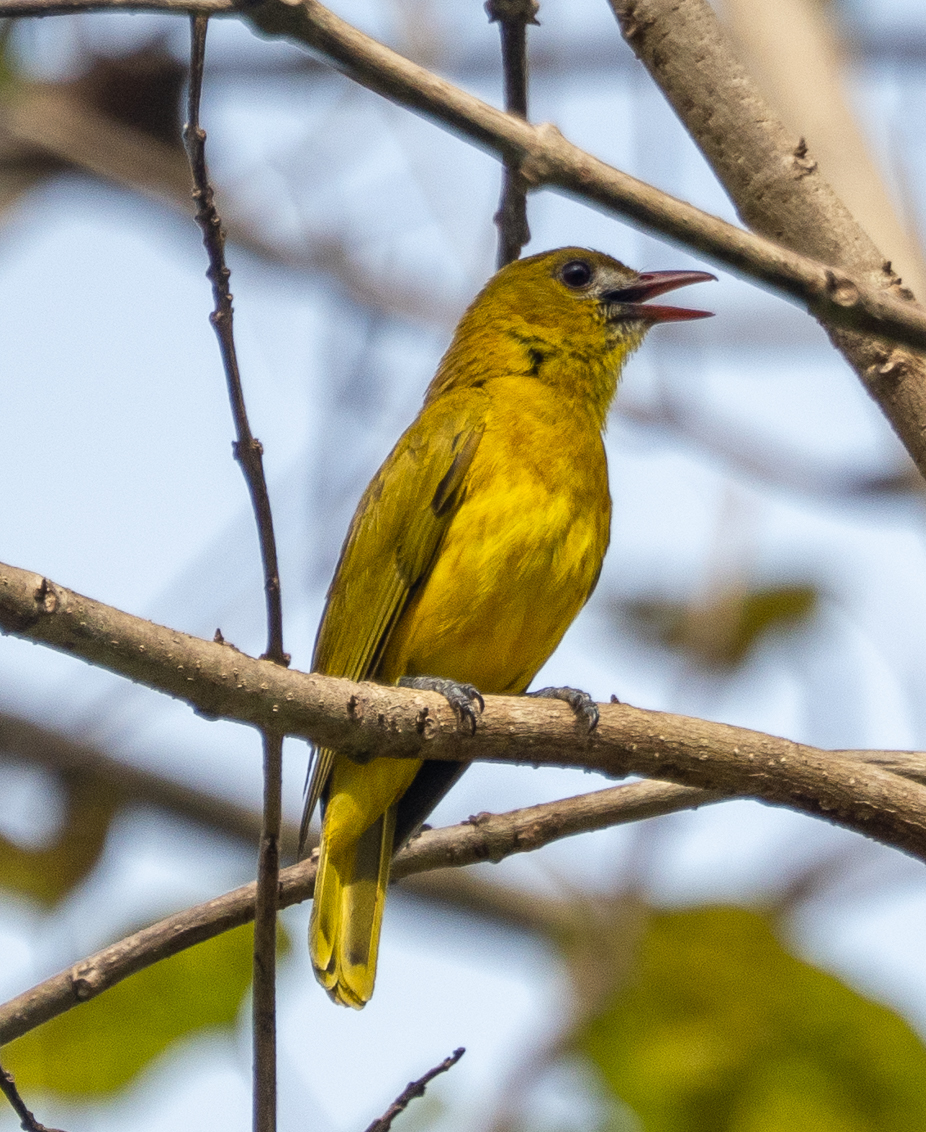

Conservation status
- Least Concern (IUCN 3.1)

Scientific classification
- Kingdom: Animalia
- Phylum: Chordata
- Class: Aves
- Order: Passeriformes
- Family: Oriolidae
- Genus: Oriolus
- Species: O. albiloris

Binomial name
- Oriolus albiloris Ogilvie-Grant, 1894

Synonyms
- Oriolus steerii albiloris

= White-lored oriole =

Species of bird

The white-lored oriole (Oriolus albiloris) is a species of bird in the family Oriolidae. It is endemic to Luzon island (Philippines). It was formerly conspecific with the Philippine oriole but has since been separated as its own species. It was also formerly theorized that the critically endangered Isabela oriole was this species until it was rediscovered and proven otherwise.

== Description ==
Ebird describes this as "A medium-sized bird of lowland forest and edge in the lowlands and lower mountains on Luzon. Overall yellow in color, slightly darker on the wings and tail, with a reddish bill and a white mark between the bill and the brown eye. Similar to the Isabela Oriole, but slightly smaller, and distinguished by the red bill and the white spot in front of the eye. Gives a whistled song typical of orioles: a medium-pitched whistled phrase of 2-3 notes, usually repeated.

== Ecology and behavior ==
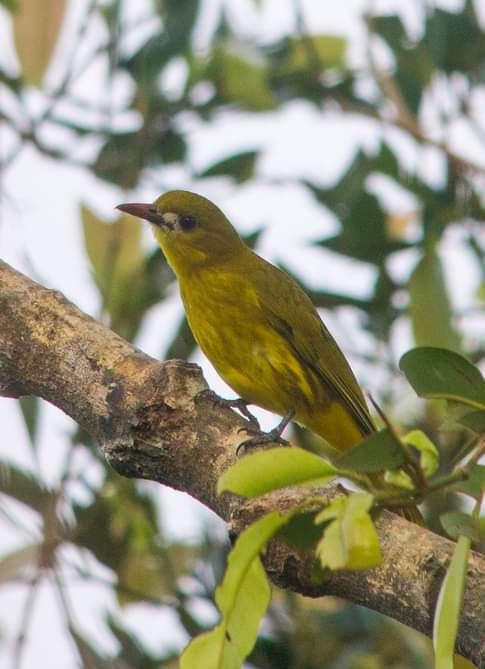

There is no known information on its diet but is believed to follow a similar diet to other orioles which consist of fruit and Typically seen alone, in pairs or small groups in the middle storey to the canopy. It is seen in mixed flocks with other birds such as bar-bellied cuckooshrikes, black-and-white trillers, Isabela oriole, blackish cuckooshrikes and other forest birds.

Nothing is known about its breeding habits except birds in breeding condition with enlarged gonads have been collected from May to June. A sub-adult bird was also seen in August.

== Habitat and conservation status ==
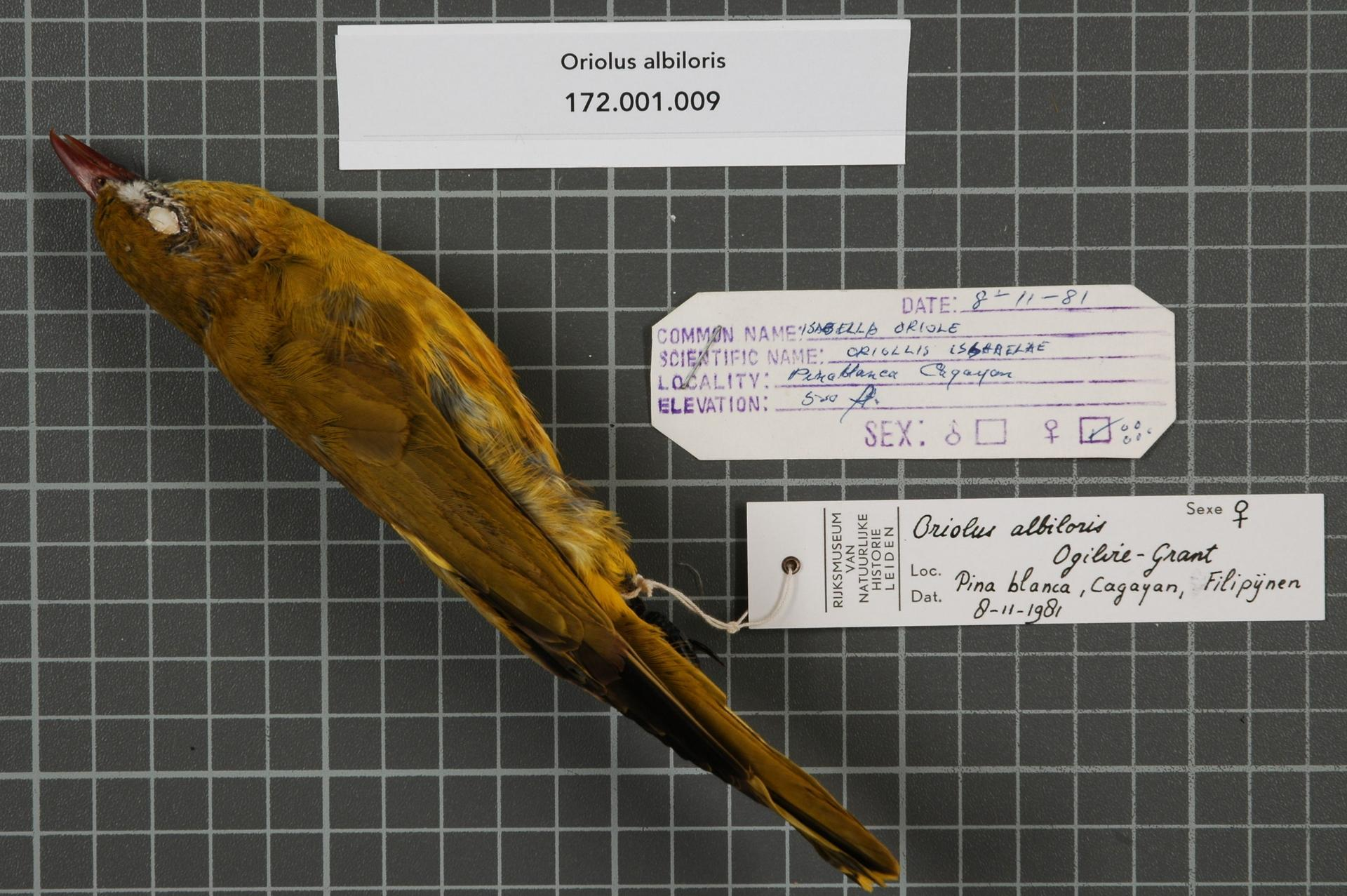
A specimen in the Naturalis Biodiversity Center

Its natural habitat is tropical moist lowland forest up to 1,200 metres (3,900 ft) and forages in the canopy.

It is currently classified as least-concern by the International Union for Conservation of Nature but its population is said to be declining. Despite not being a threatened species, it is still rarely observed by birdwatchers and rare across its range. Its threats are mainly habitat loss due to deforestation for lumber, mining and farmlands. There are no known targeted conservation actions for this bird, but it will indirectly benefit from the conservation of other North Luzon species like the Critically Endangered Isabela oriole.

It occurs in a few protected areas such as Northern Sierra Madre Natural Park and Bataan National Park but despite this legal protection, enforcement is lax and these areas continue to be deforested.
