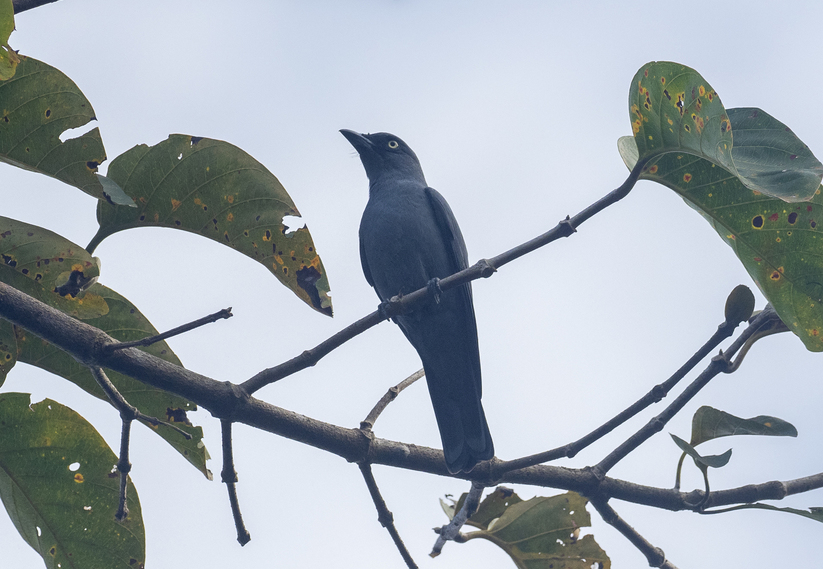

Conservation status
- Not evaluated (IUCN 3.1)

Scientific classification
- Kingdom: Animalia
- Phylum: Chordata
- Class: Aves
- Order: Passeriformes
- Family: Campephagidae
- Genus: Coracina
- Species: C. mindorensis

Binomial name
- Coracina mindorensis (Steere, 1890)

= Mindoro cuckooshrike =

Species of bird

The Mindoro cuckooshrike (Coracina mindorensis) is a passerine bird in the family Campephagidae that is endemic to the islands of Mindoro and Tablas in the Philippines. The species was formerly considered to be a subspecies of the bar-bellied cuckooshrike.

== Description and taxonomy ==
This species is described as a large cuckooshrike with pale gray eyes and its plummage is almost uniform gray with a black mask reaching the forehead and lores. This species exhibits sexual dimorphism as females have some slight barring on the underwing.

The Mindoro cuckooshrike was formally described in 1890 by the American ornithologist Joseph Beal Steere based on a specimen collected on the island of Mindoro in the Philippines. He coined the binomial name Artamides mindorensis. It was formerly treated as a subspecies of the bar-bellied cuckooshrike (Coracina striata) but was promoted to species status based on the significant differences in vocalizations and plumage. The species is monotypic: no subspecies are recognised.

== Ecology and behavior ==
This cuckooshrike usually lives in small groups or in mixed-species foraging flocks with other cuckooshrikes such as the Black-bibbed cicadabird.

As a newly split species, not much is known about this species itself but based on information about the Bar-bellied cuckooshrike it is also presumed to mainly eats insects, including caterpillars, mantises, and dragonflies, and figs. Breeds from April to May. Nest is described as a shallow cup of moss, leaves, roots and mud around 20 meters above the ground. Lays 2 pale gray eggs. Only the female has been observed feeding the chicks.

== Habitat and conservation status ==
Its natural habitat is tropical moist lownland and montane forests up to 2,000 meters above sea level. It is typically found in the canopy.

This species has yet to be assessed by the International Union for Conservation of Nature. However, this species is likely declining and possibly threatened as a large majority of Mindoro and Romblon endemic birds are threatened species. This species' main threat is habitat loss with wholesale clearance of forest habitats as a result of legal and illegal logging, and conversion into farmlands through Slash-and-burn and other methods. The species does not occur at high density even within the little remaining forest cover on Tablas. On Mindoro, by 1988, extensive deforestation had reduced forest cover to a mere 120 km^{2}, most of which are in the highlands. The lowland forest that does remain is highly fragmented. Slash-and-burn cultivation, occasional selective logging and rattan collection threaten the forest fragments that still support the species. Dynamite blasting for marble is an additional threat to forest at Puerto Galera

Occurs in a few protected areas in the Dubduban Watershed in Tablas, Mount Halcon, Mounts Iglit–Baco Natural Park, Mount Calavite and the Siburan Forest Reserve but actual protection and enforcement from illegal logging and hunting are lax.
