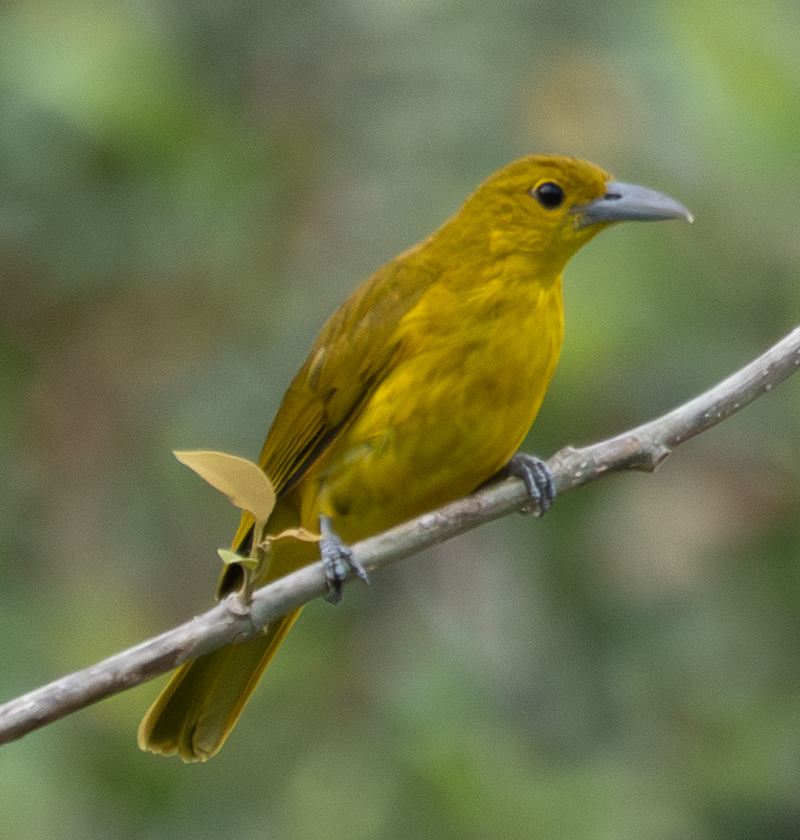

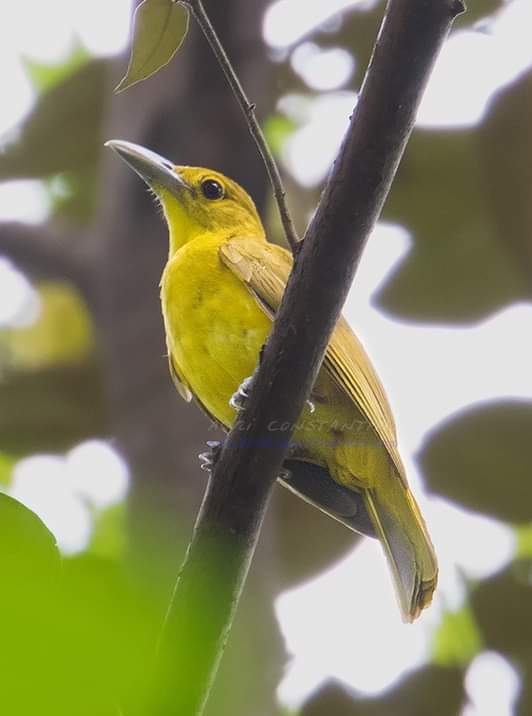

Conservation status
- Critically Endangered (IUCN 3.1)

Scientific classification
- Kingdom: Animalia
- Phylum: Chordata
- Class: Aves
- Order: Passeriformes
- Family: Oriolidae
- Genus: Oriolus
- Species: O. isabellae

Binomial name
- Oriolus isabellae Ogilvie-Grant, 1894
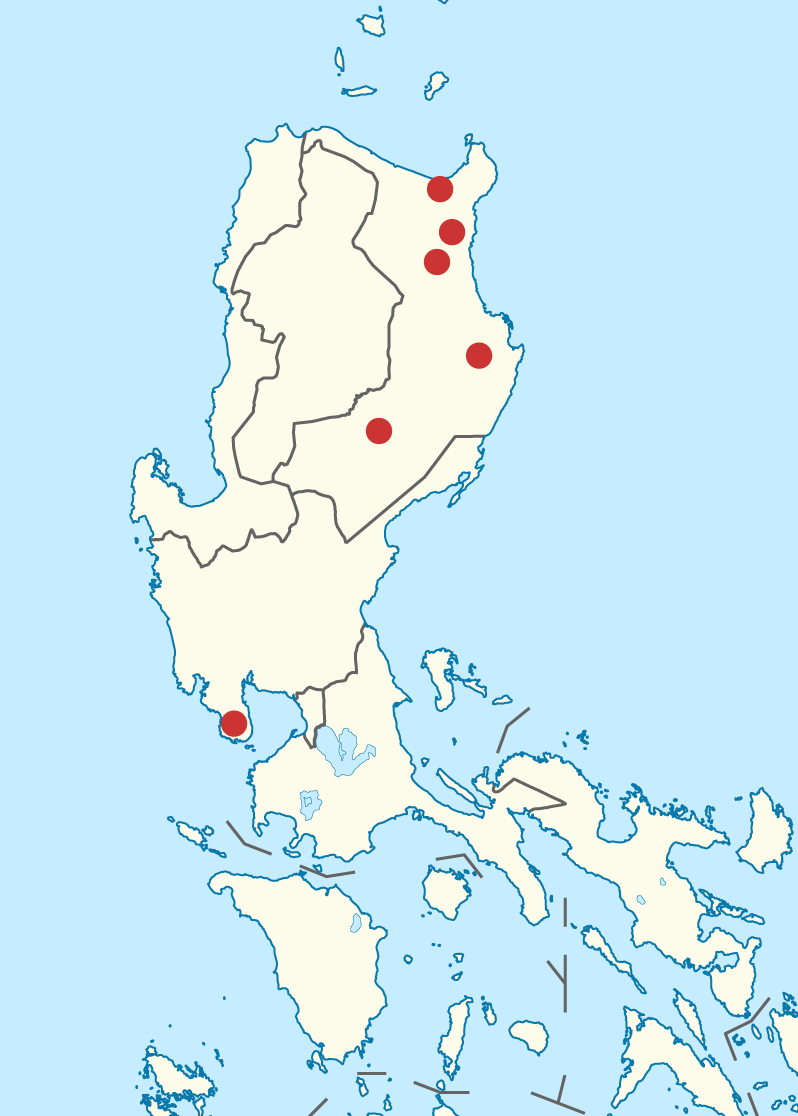
- Known locations of sightings or collections

= Isabela oriole =

Species of bird

The Isabela oriole (Oriolus isabellae) is a species of the oriole family endemic to Luzon in the Philippines. It is an oriole identified by its yellowish green plumage and a very large gray bill. This species was presumed to be extinct for many years until its rediscovery in December 1993 near Diffun, Quirino, and in Mansarong in September 1994. Additional sightings were made in San Mariano, Isabela. and Baggao, Cagayan Valley It It is found in moist lowland forest up to 440 masl. It is critically endangered with estimates of just 50 to 250 mature individuals remaining. It is threatened by habitat loss and hunting.

== Description and taxonomy ==
It is a medium sized bird of the lowland forest of Northern Luzon. It is primarily yellow with a hint of olive on its upper parts. Its bill is large and silver.

This species has multiple class. One call is a repeated whistle with descending first note followed by a quick rising second note. It also has a rattling call.

The Isabela oriole is commonly confused with the much more common white-lored orioles and black-naped orioles. It is differentiated by its extremely large grey bill, uniform olive-yellow plumage and lack of white on its lores.

The Isabela oriole is most closely related to the white-lored oriole. Both species are closely related to the paraphyletic Philippine oriole. The Isabela oriole is sometimes considered to form a superspecies with the dark-throated oriole and the Philippine oriole. Alternate names for the Isabela oriole include the green-lored oriole and olive-lored oriole.

== Ecology and behavior ==
Feeds mostly on fruit but also insects such as larvae and caterpillars. Typically seen alone, in pairs or small groups in the middle storey to the canopy. It is seen in mixed flocks with other birds such as bar-bellied cuckooshrikes, black-and-white trillers, blackish cuckooshrikes and other forest birds.

Breeding believed to occur during April to June. In 2022, the first record and photographs of a juvenile were released.

== Distribution and habitat ==
The Isabela oriole is now confined to the lowland forests in the Northern Sierra Madre mountain range in Luzon. It is frequently seen in the canopy and middle storeys of forests and also forest edge or patches up to 440 masl.

It has not been recorded in Bataan province since 1947 despite an intensive search done in 2014.

== Conservation status ==
The Isabela oriole has a known population of about 50-250 mature individuals and is assessed as Critically Endangered based on its extremely small and fragmented population. Organisations such as Buhay-Ilang, ORIS Project and the Mabuwaya Foundation are working to conserve them with educational programs and festivals celebrating this bird. The oriole is now a Flagship species for the North Sierra Madre National Park.

Since 2015, a research and conservation project for the Isabela Oriole has been implemented in Baggao by the Mabuwaya Foundation. Information, education and communication, community consultations are held in Baggao with the local government, the Department of Environment and Natural Resources and local residents. Plans are underway to declare the oriole site in Baggao a Critical Habitat and to encourage ecotourism.

Under the Philippine law RA9147, it is completely illegal to hunt these birds or to capture and keep them as pets. As it is crically endangered species on the Philippine Red List, any violations have harsher punishments including "imprisonment of a minimum of six (6) years and one (1) day to twelve (12) years and/or a fine of One hundred thousand pesos (100,000.00) to One million pesos (1,000,000.00), if inflicted or undertaken against species listed as critical"
