= Paul Robert Kollibay =

German lawyer and ornithologist (1863–1919)

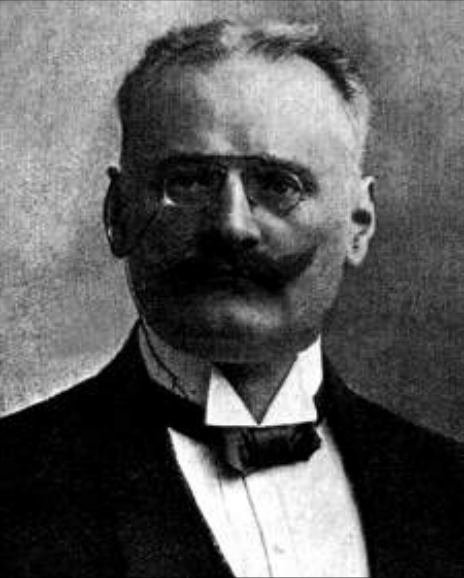
Paul Robert Kollibay

Paul Robert Kollibay (4 July 1863 – 5 November 1919) was a German lawyer and ornithologist. He specialised in the birds of Upper Silesia and his collection of bird skins is held at the museum of the University of Wroclaw.

Born in Gorzów Śląski, then called Landsberg, Upper Silesia, Kollibay was the son of a district judge. He went to the local elementary school and then the Gymnasium in Neustadt where he met Friedrich Kutter (1834–1891) who influenced his interests in birds. He went to Breslau to study law and completed school in 1885. Kollibay became a notary in 1897, a Judicial Councillor in 1910, and a board member of the Bar association in 1917.

His work on birds began in 1879, with studies of the species in the Prussian Province of Silesia which was published in 1906 with supplements in 1909 and later updated by Anton Reichenow. He became a specialist on the swifts of the region and was honoured in a subspecies Apus apus kollibayi described by Victor von Tschusi which is now considered synonymous to the nominate form. He was a member of the German Ornithological Society and the British Ornithologists' Union. A few subspecies Carduelis carduelis paropanisi, Galerida cristata subtaurica, Pisorhina leucotis granti were described by Kollibay. Kollibay's collection of 3200 bird skins was purchased by the zoological museum of Breslau University but many specimens were destroyed during the Second World War.
