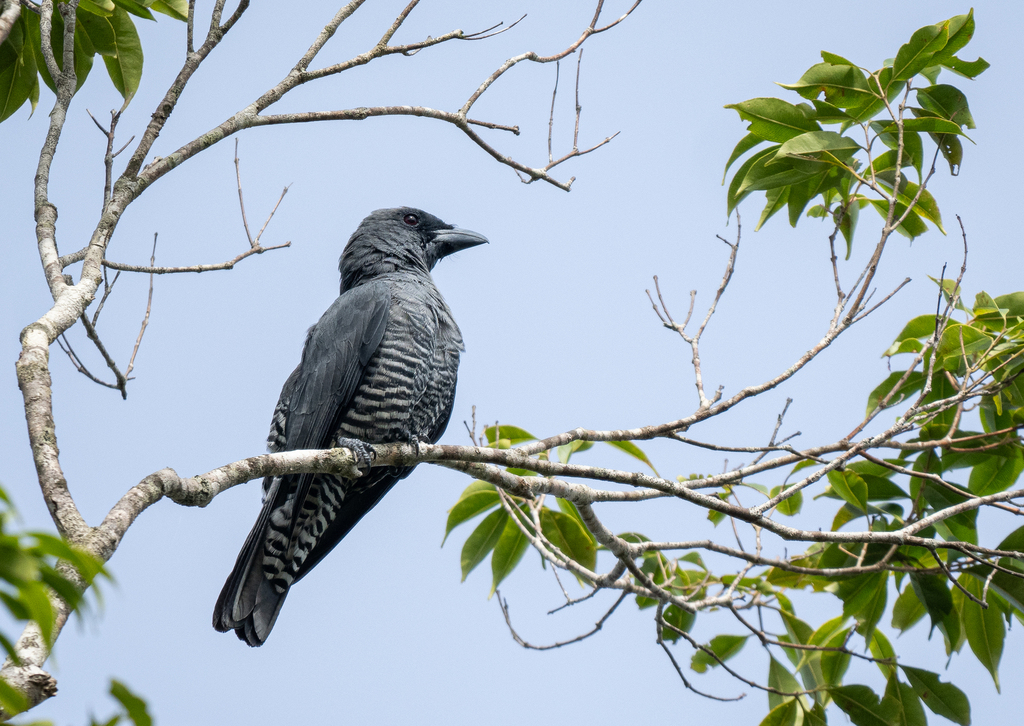
- Male
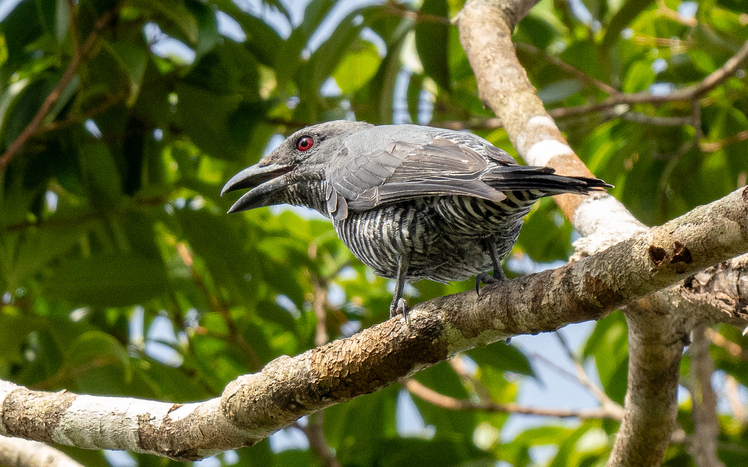
- Female

Conservation status
- Not evaluated (IUCN 3.1)

Scientific classification
- Kingdom: Animalia
- Phylum: Chordata
- Class: Aves
- Order: Passeriformes
- Family: Campephagidae
- Genus: Coracina
- Species: C. panayensis

Binomial name
- Coracina panayensis (Steere, 1890)

= Visayan cuckooshrike =

Species of bird

The Visayan cuckooshrike (Coracina panayensis) is a passerine bird in the family Campephagidae that is found on the western Visayas of the Philippines on the islands of Panay, Negros, Masbate, Guimaras and Ticao Island. The species was formerly considered to be a subspecies of the bar-bellied cuckooshrike.

== Description and taxonomy ==
This species is described a large plain coloured cuckooshrike with red eyes and barring belly and rump. This species is sexual dimorphic. The male has all gray upperparts with a black mask. The female has a less distinct black mask and fine black and gray barring on the throat and breast.

Its call is described as a 2 to 4 harsh rising notes. Another call is a slow wavering and rasping call.

The Visayan cuckooshrike was formally described in 1890 by the American ornithologist Joseph Beal Steere based on a specimen collected on the island of Panay in the Philippines. He coined the binomial name Artamides panayensis. It was formerly treated as a subspecies of the bar-bellied cuckooshrike (Coracina striata) but was promoted to species status based on the differences in morphology and vocalizations. The species is monotypic: no subspecies are recognised.

== Ecology and behavior ==
This cuckooshrike usually lives in small groups or in mixed-species foraging flocks with other cuckooshrikes such as the White-winged cuckooshrike.

As a newly split species, not much is known about this species itself but based on information about the Bar-bellied cuckooshrike it is also presumed to mainly eats insects, including caterpillars, mantises, and dragonflies, and figs. Nothing is known about this species' breeding habits.

== Habitat and conservation status ==
Its natural habitat is tropical moist lownland and montane forests up to 2,000 meters above sea level. It is typically found in the canopy.

This species has yet to be assessed by the International Union for Conservation of Nature. However, this species may possibly be threatened as its range is greatly deforested. This species' main threat is habitat loss with wholesale clearance of forest habitats as a result of logging, agricultural conversion and mining activities occurring within the range. Negros Island is one of the most deforested areas in the country due to its sugar industry and logging with most of its forests being totally lost before the 21st century. Forest cover on Negros and Panay is just 3% and 6% respectively and these figures are still declining. There are no recent records on Masbate, Guimaras and Ticao Island. These islands have even less forest than Negros and Panay.

It occurs in a few protected areas within Mt. Kanlaon Natural Park and Northern Negros Natural Park; however, protection and enforcement against deforestation is lax. It also occurs in the proposed Central Panay Mountain Range Park which contains the largest block of remaining forest in the Western Visayas, and the tourist destination of Twin Lakes (Mount Talinis). Both sites benefit from conservation funding but are still under threat by deforestation.
