= Sulu cuckooshrike =

Conservation status
- Not evaluated (IUCN 3.1)

Scientific classification
- Kingdom: Animalia
- Phylum: Chordata
- Class: Aves
- Order: Passeriformes
- Family: Campephagidae
- Genus: Coracina
- Species: C. guillemardi

Binomial name
- Coracina guillemardi (Salvadori, 1886)

Species of bird

The Sulu cuckooshrike (Coracina guillemardi) is a passerine bird in the family Campephagidae that is found in the Sulu Archipelago of the Philippines. The species was formerly considered to be a subspecies of the bar-bellied cuckooshrike.

It was briefly listed as a lost species by the Search for Lost Birds as it was last documented in 2008. This species was photographed in 2025 and again in 2026.

== Description and taxonomy ==
This species is described as a large cuckooshrike with pale gray eyes and its plummage is almost uniform gray with a black mask reaching the forehead and lores. Among all Philippine bar-bellied cuckooshrikes this species does not have any obvious barring and is larger.

The Sulu cuckooshrike was formally described in 1886 by the Italian zoologist Tommaso Salvadori based on a specimen collected on the island of Lapac in the Sulu Archipelago of the Philippines. He coined the binomial name Graucalus guillemardi where the specific epithet was chosen to honour the naturalist and traveller Francis Guillemard. The species was formerly treated as a subspecies of the bar-bellied cuckooshrike (Coracina striata) but was promoted to species status based on the differences in morphology and vocalizations. The species is monotypic: no subspecies are recognised.

== Ecology and behavior ==
This cuckooshrike usually lives in small groups or in mixed-species foraging flocks with other cuckooshrikes such as the Black-bibbed cicadabird.

As a newly split species, not much is known about this species itself but based on information about the Bar-bellied cuckooshrike it is also presumed to mainly eats insects, including caterpillars, mantises, and dragonflies, and figs. Breeds from April to May. Nest described as a shallow cup of moss, leaves, roots and mud around 20 meters above the ground. Lays 2 pale gray eggs. Only the female has been observed feeding the chicks.

== Habitat and conservation status ==
Its natural habitat is tropical moist lowland forests. It is typically found in the canopy.

This species has yet to be assessed by the International Union for Conservation of Nature. However, this species is likely declining. Almost all birds endemic to the Sulu archipelago are threatened and this is likely the case for this species. This species' main threat is habitat loss with wholesale clearance of forest habitats as a result of logging, agricultural conversion and mining activities occurring within the range.
