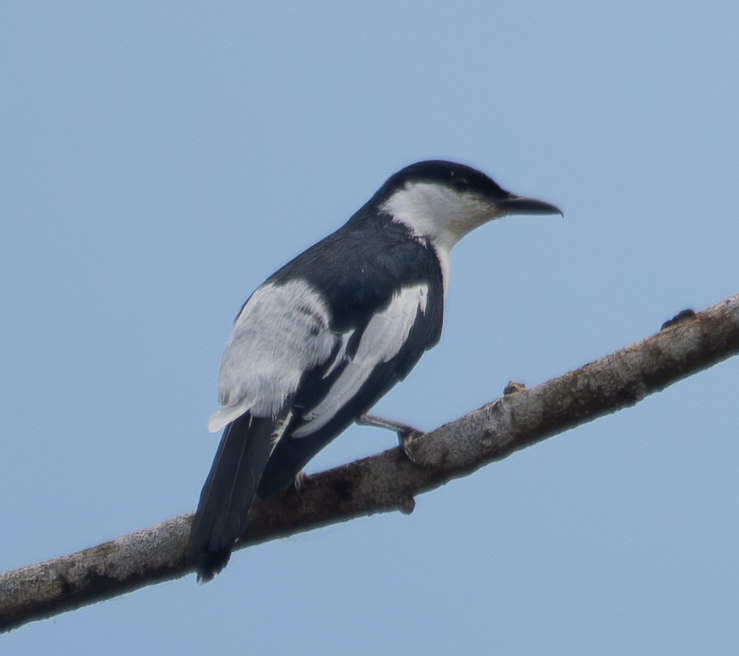
- Male northern black-and-white triller of the subspecies melanoleuca in Cagayan Valley
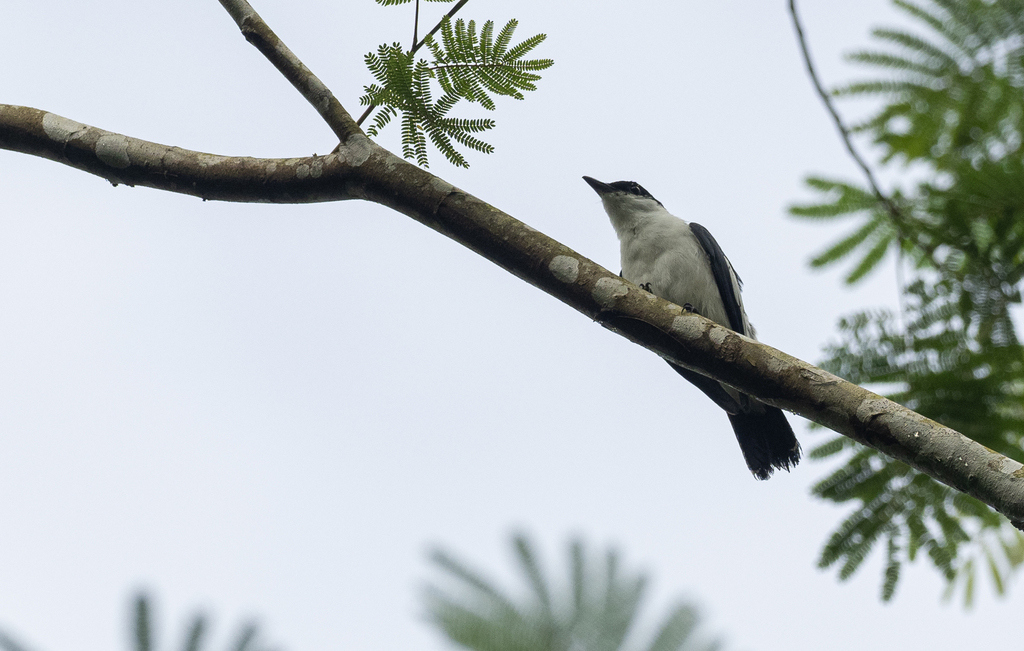
- Male southern black-and-white triller of the subspecies minor in Sultan Kudarat

Conservation status
- Least Concern (IUCN 3.1)

Scientific classification
- Kingdom: Animalia
- Phylum: Chordata
- Class: Aves
- Order: Passeriformes
- Family: Campephagidae
- Genus: Lalage
- Species: L. melanoleuca

Binomial name
- Lalage melanoleuca (Blyth, 1861)

= Black-and-white triller =

Species of bird

The black-and-white triller (Lalage melanoleuca) is a species of bird in the family Campephagidae. It is endemic to the Philippines. Its natural habitat is tropical moist lowland forests.

== Description ==
They are sexually dimorphic in which males have the eponymous black bib and overall darker plumage with the females lighter and having "bibs" of either gray or white depending on the subspecies.

=== Subspecies ===
Two subspecies are recognized:

- L. m. melanoleuca — Known as the northern black-and-white triller; found on Luzon, Mindoro and Semirara Island
- L. m. minor — Known as the southern black-and-white triller; found on Samar, Leyte, Bohol and Mindanao

No known differences between the males of Southern and Northerns. Northern females have white underparts with a barred throat and chest, while southern females have a gray throat and chest with faint barring below.

The Handbook of the Birds of the World and International Union for Conservation of Nature recognize these 2 subspecies as separate species.

== Ecology and behavior ==
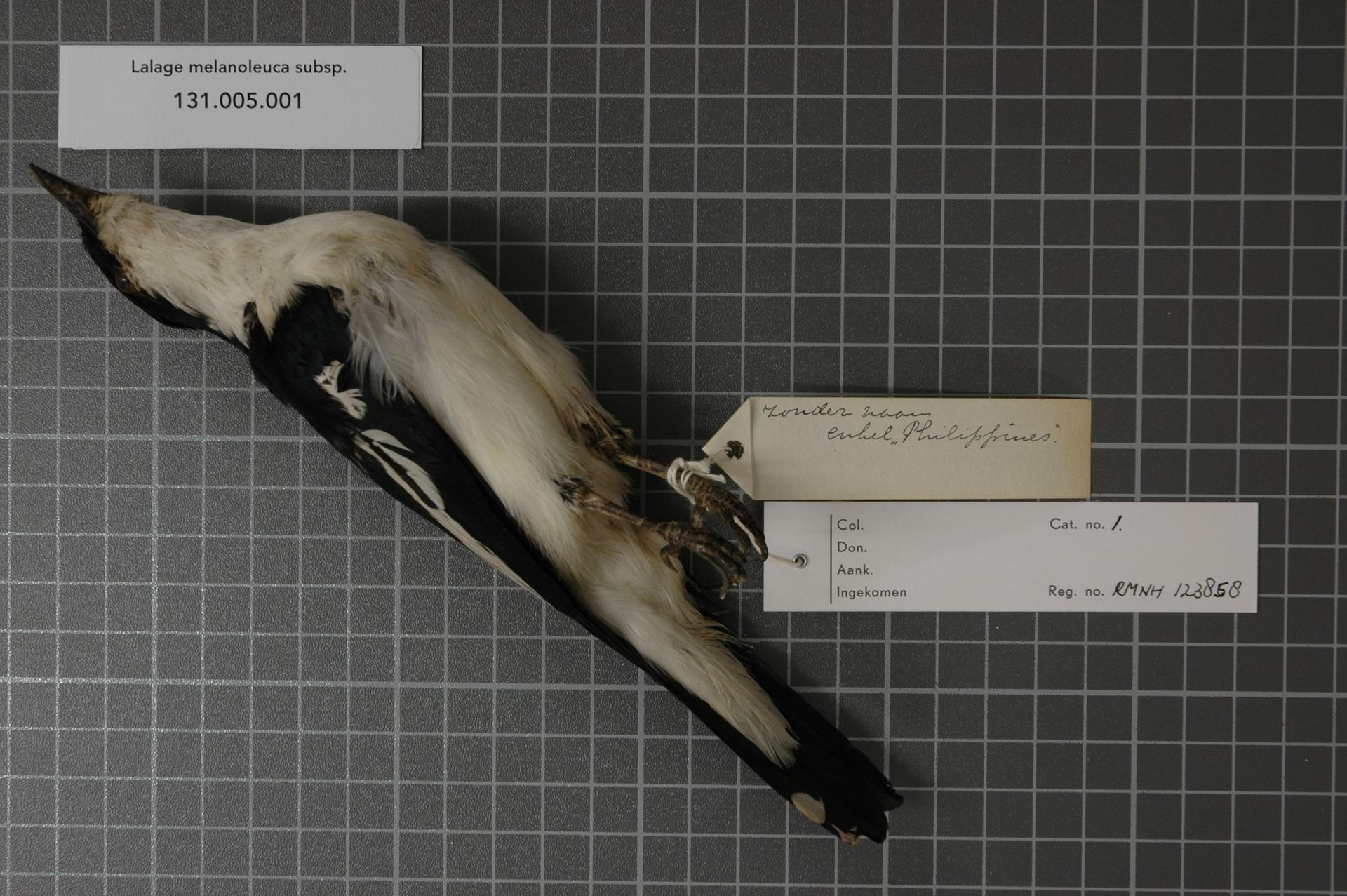
A skin from the Naturalis Biodiversity Centre

Its diet has not yet been recorded but it is presumed to feed on insects. Occurs singly, in small groups or with mixed-species flocks of other medium sized birds like bar-bellied cuckooshrike, Philippine oriole, black-bibbed cicadabird and Philippine leafbird. Typically forages in the canopy.

There is barely any information about its breeding habits and nesting. Breeding season believed to fall around March to May as juveniles have been seen in May.

== Habitat and conservation status ==
Its natural habitats at tropical moist lowland primary forest and secondary forest up to 1,000 meters above sea level for the Northern subspecies and 600 meters above sea level for the Southern.

The IUCN Red List has assessed this bird, both Southern and Northern, as least-concern species although it is uncommon in all parts of its range and is poorly known. More studies are recommended to better understand this species, population and conservation status.
