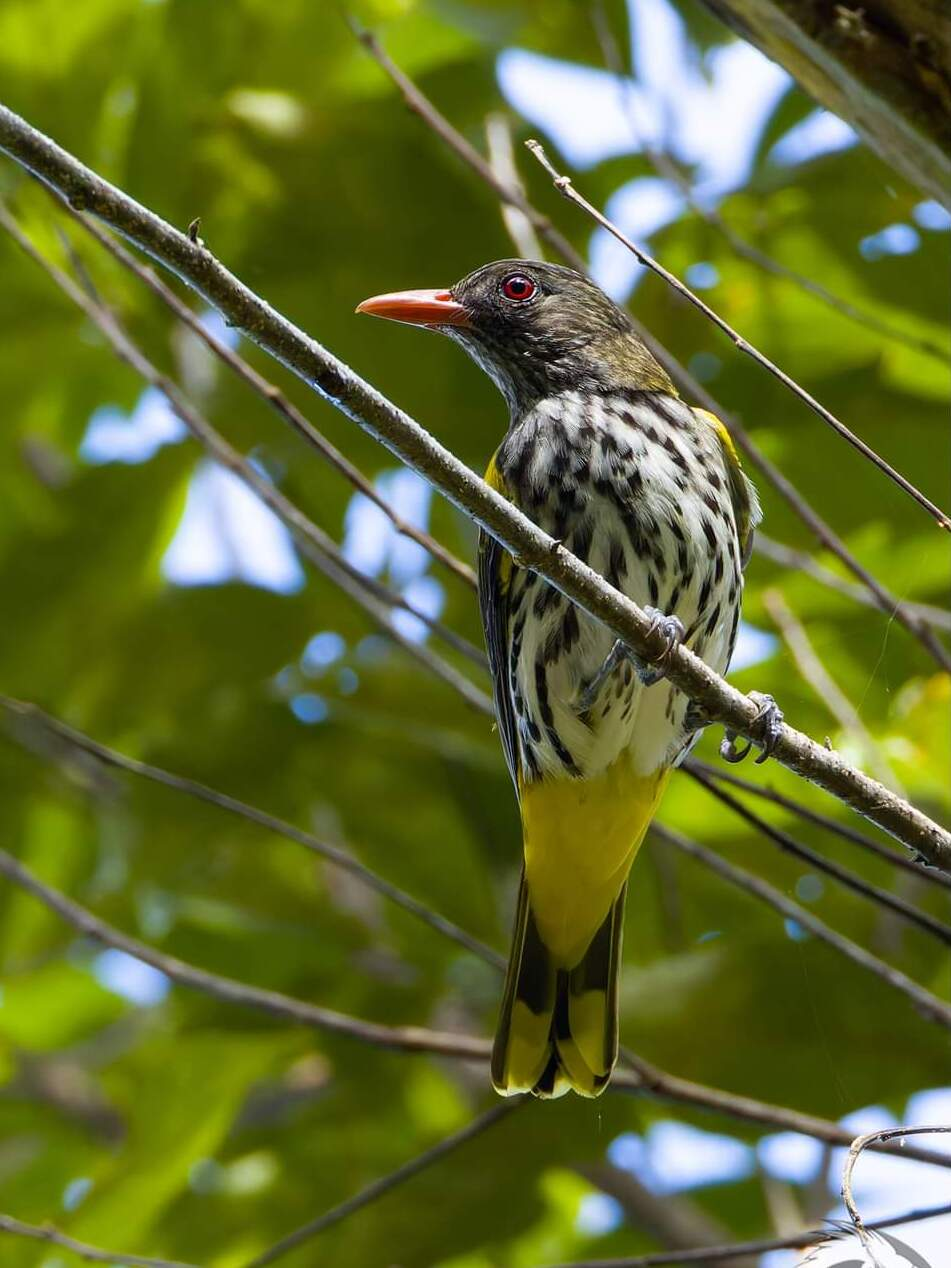
- ssp. persuasus

Conservation status
- Least Concern (IUCN 3.1)

Scientific classification
- Kingdom: Animalia
- Phylum: Chordata
- Class: Aves
- Order: Passeriformes
- Family: Oriolidae
- Genus: Oriolus
- Species: O. consobrinus

Binomial name
- Oriolus consobrinus Wardlaw-Ramsay, 1880

= Ventriloquial oriole =

Species of bird

The ventriloquial oriole (Oriolus consobrinus) is a species of bird in the family Oriolidae.

It is found in Southeast Asia through Borneo and on the islands of Palawan and Culion in the Philippines. Its natural habitat is subtropical or tropical moist lowland forests where it is threatened by habitat loss.

The ventriloquial oriole was formerly considered to be conspecific with the dark-throated oriole (Oriolus xanthonotus).

== Description and taxonomy ==
Two subspecies are recognized:

- O. c. consobrinus - Ramsay, RGW, 1880: Originally described as a separate species. Found on Borneo and offlying islets
- O. c. persuasus - Bangs, 1922: Found in Palawan and Culion

== Habitat and conservation status ==
Its natural habitat is tropical moist lowland forest up to 500 meters.

It has been assessed by the International Union for Conservation of Nature as a least-concern species but populations are declining due to habitat loss. This species is somewhat tolerant of habitat loss but the complete conversion of forest into palm oil plantations have caused a slow decline in this species.
