= Friedrich Kutter =

Silesian ornithologist and physician (1834–1891)

Friedrich Kutter (1 October 1834 – 7 March 1891) was a German physician and ornithologist who was among the early adopters of evolutionary thinking in oology, the study of birds' eggs. He served as a president of the German Ornithological Society in 1890-1891.

== Biography ==
Kutter was born in Grünberg in Silesia where his father was a well-known physician. He went to school in Sorau and studied medicine at the Friedrich Wilhelms Institute in Berlin, where he graduated in 1856. He then worked as a regimental physician in the 1st Cavalry (Uhlan) regiment stationed at various times in Berlin, Głogów, Poznań, Prudnik and Kassel, with active wartime service across Europe during the Austro-Prussian and Franco-Prussian wars and received several war medals including an Iron Cross, and an Order of the Red Eagle.

From an early age he was interested in birds and was a collector of eggs. He was among the early members of the German Ornithological Society which produced the journal Naumannia from 1851 under the leadership of the pastor August Carl Eduard Baldamus. Another journal, the Journal for Ornithology was begun by Jean Cabanis in 1853 in Berlin and Kutter became a contributor to this during his medical studies years in Berlin and became acquainted with Bernard Altum, Alfred Hausmann, Karl Bolle, Theobald Krüper, and Carl Vangerow. Kutter took an evolutionary view within oology. He travelled to the Philippines and collected specimens from there which were examined by Cabanis. Butio kutteri was named after him by Cabanis but this is now a junior synonym for Gorsachius melanolophus. Kutter described a species of cuckooshrike, now the subspecies Coracina striata kochii in 1882.

Kutter died suddenly of a cardiac arrest and is buried in Zielona Góra.
