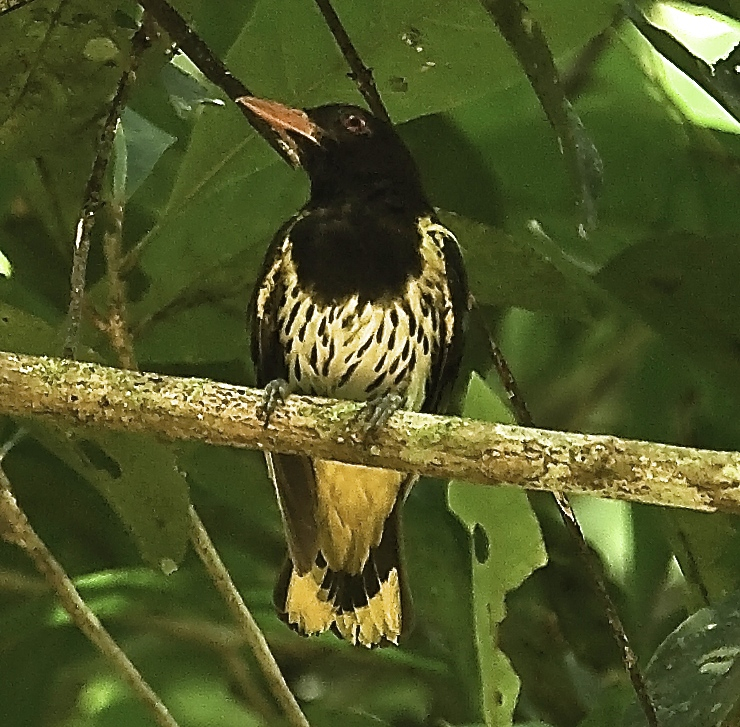

Conservation status
- Near Threatened (IUCN 3.1)

Scientific classification
- Kingdom: Animalia
- Phylum: Chordata
- Class: Aves
- Order: Passeriformes
- Family: Oriolidae
- Genus: Oriolus
- Species: O. xanthonotus

Binomial name
- Oriolus xanthonotus Horsfield, 1821

= Dark-throated oriole =

Species of bird

The dark-throated oriole (Oriolus xanthonotus) is a species of bird in the family Oriolidae.

It is found in Southeast Asia through the Malay Peninsula, Sumatra, Bangka), Java and southwestern Borneo. Its natural habitat is subtropical or tropical moist lowland forests where it is threatened by habitat loss.

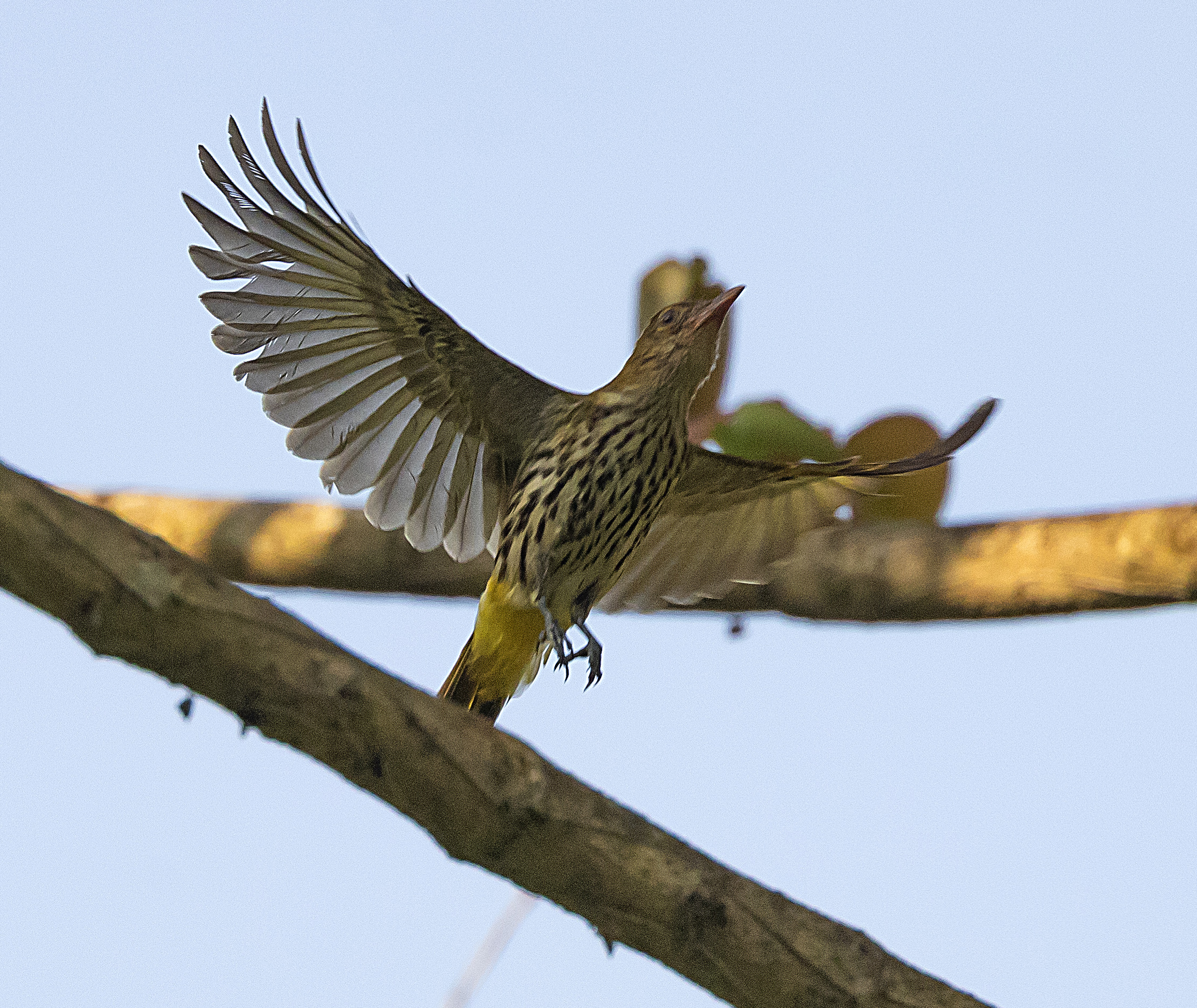
Dark-throated Oriole (Female)

== Taxonomy ==
The dark-throated oriole was formerly considered to be conspecific with the ventriloquial oriole (Oriolus consobrinus). The dark-throated oriole is sometimes considered to form a superspecies with the Philippine oriole and the Isabela oriole. Alternate names for the dark-throated oriole include the black-headed oriole, black-throated oriole and Malaysian oriole. The alternate name 'black-headed oriole' should not be confused with the species of the same name, Oriolus larvatus.

Two subspecies are recognized:

- O. x. xanthonotus - Horsfield, 1821: Found on the Malay Peninsula, Sumatra, Java and south-western Borneo
- O. x. mentawi - Chasen & Kloss, 1926: Found on the Mentawai Islands archipelago off the west coast of Sumatra, in Indonesia.
