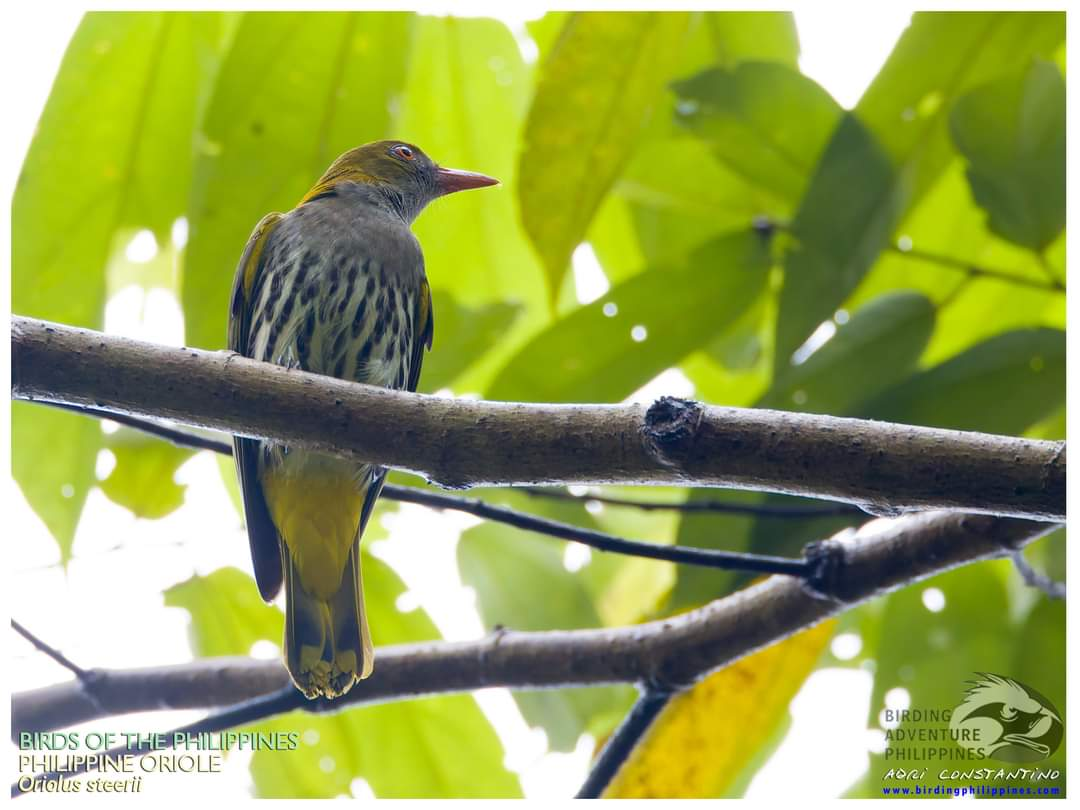

Conservation status
- Least Concern (IUCN 3.1)

Scientific classification
- Kingdom: Animalia
- Phylum: Chordata
- Class: Aves
- Order: Passeriformes
- Family: Oriolidae
- Genus: Oriolus
- Species: O. steerii

Binomial name
- Oriolus steerii Sharpe, 1877

Synonyms
- Broderipus acrorhynchus; Oriolus acrorhynchus; Oriolus xanthonotus steerii; Xanthonotus steerii

= Philippine oriole =

Species of bird

The Philippine oriole (Oriolus steerii) or grey-throated oriole is a species of bird in the family Oriolidae. It is endemic to the Philippine found on Mindanao and most of the Visayan Islands.

Its natural habitat is tropical moist lowland forests. The species is fairly common throughout its range, but the Cebu race (O. s. assimilis) was last sighted in 1906 and is now classified as extinct.

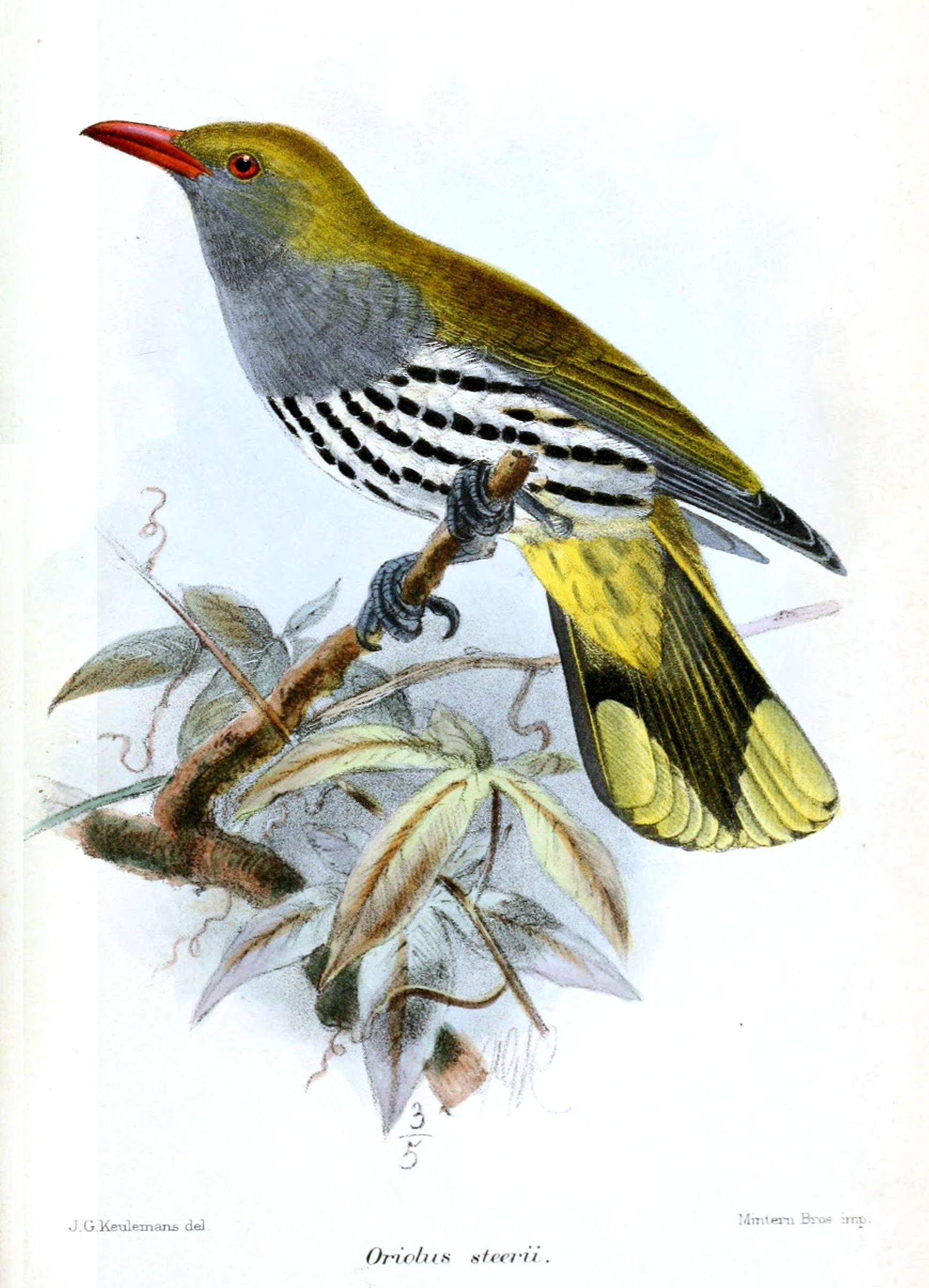

== Description and taxonomy ==
First described by Richard Bowdler Sharpe in 1877, the Philippine oriole is a member of the genus Oriolus. Some authorities have considered it to be conspecific with, or as a subspecies of, the dark-throated oriole. These two species may form a superspecies with the Isabela oriole.

=== Subspecies ===
Five subspecies are recognized:

- O. s. samarensis - Steere, 1890: Found on Samar, Leyte, Bohol and eastern Mindanao
- †Cebu dark-throated oriole (O. s. assimilis) - Tweeddale, 1878: Originally described as a separate species. Formerly found on Cebu
- O. s. steerii - Sharpe, 1877: Found on Masbate and Negros
- O. s. basilanicus - Ogilvie-Grant, 1896: Found on Basilan and western Mindanao
- O. s. cinereogenys - Bourns & Worcester, 1894: Found in the Sulu Archipelago

== Ecology and behavior ==
Its diet has not yet been recorded but it is presumed to feed on insects, fruits, nectar and berries. Occurs singly, in small groups or with mixed-species flocks of other medium sized birds like Bar-bellied cuckooshrike, Black-bibbed cicadabird and Philippine leafbird.

There is no information about its breeding habits and nesting.

== Habitat and conservation status ==
This species habitat is primary and secondary forest up to 1,200 meters above sea level.

IUCN has assessed this bird as least-concern species with the population believed to be stable. However, deforestation in the Philippines continues throughout the country due to slash and burn farming, mining, illegal logging and habitat conversion. This species is still trapped for the pet trade.

It is found in multiple protected areas such as Pasonanca Natural Park, Rajah Sikatuna Protected Landscape, Northern Negros Natural Park and Samar Island Natural Park but like all areas in the Philippines, protection is lax and deforestation continues despite this protection on paper.
