= Theobald Johannes Krüper =

German ornithologist and entomologist

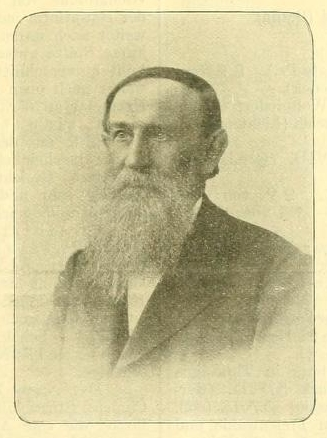

Theobald Johannes Krüper (30 June 1829 – 4 April 1917) was a German ornithologist and entomologist who worked mainly as a curator at the University of Athens museum. He collected extensively in Iceland and in southern and central Europe including in the Balkans. Krüper's nuthatch (Sitta krueperi) was named for him by August von Pelzeln.

== Biography ==
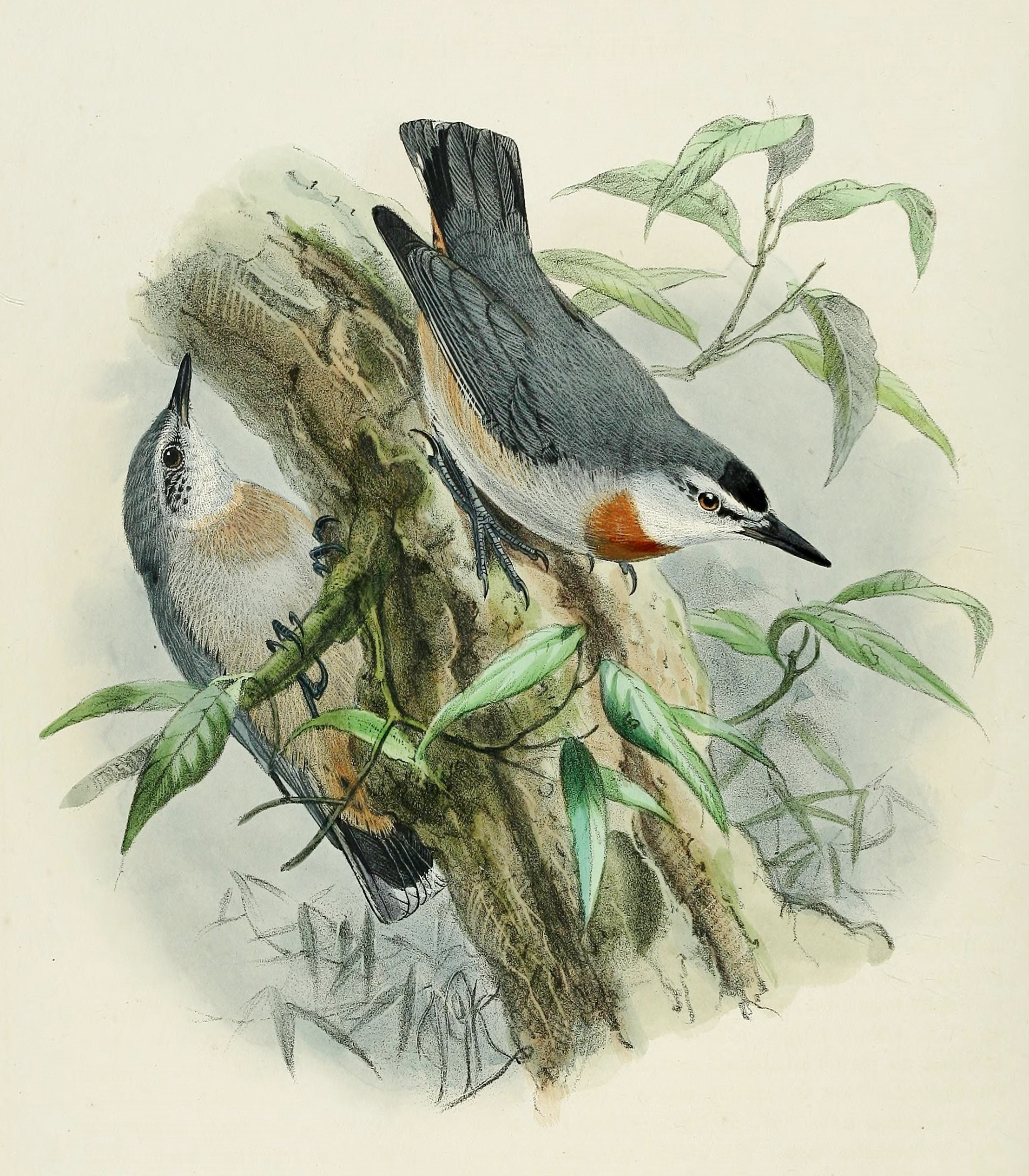
Painting of Krüper's nuthatch

Krüper was born in Ückermünde in Pomerania where his father was a merchant. He went to the local schools before going to high school in 1844 to Stettin after which he went to the University of Berlin. As a child he began collecting butterflies and birds eggs and peaked at high school after meeting Carl August Dohrn. The lepidopterist Erich Martin Hering also inspired him and Martin Carl Heinrich von Lichtenstein, privy councillor in Berlin entrusted Krüper with the egg collections at the museum offering him a position to deal with the mollusc collections. Von Lichtenstein's death in 1857 prevented this. Otto Staudinger who was also studying in Berlin became a close and lifelong friend of Krüper. In 1856 he explored northern Iceland while Staudinger spent time in the southern part. In 1855 he travelled with natural history dealer Keitel from Berlin. He visited Iceland again in 1856 and Gotland in 1857 where he also obtained fossils. In 1872 he became a curator at the University Museum in Athens. He then collected extensively in the Mediterranean region covering Macedonia, Smyrna, Constantinople and the Kyllene Mountains. He published extensively in the journals Naumannia and the Journal für Ornithologie. Krüper lived with an Athenian woman from 1864 but at the time of his death in Athens they were childless and his collections were transferred to the Athens museum.

Some of his collections also went to "Otto Staudinger - Andreas Bang-Haas" and Wilhelm Schlüter from which they were sold on to several institutions including Museum für Naturkunde in Berlin and the now Slovak National Museum in Bratislava.

Krüper's nuthatch (Sitta krueperi) was named for him by August von Pelzeln. The millipede genus Krueperia was named for him by Karl Wilhelm Verhoeff in 1900.

Dr. Krüper died in Athens on April 4, 1917, and he is now buried at the First Cemetery of Athens.
