= Joseph Beal Steere =

American ornithologist

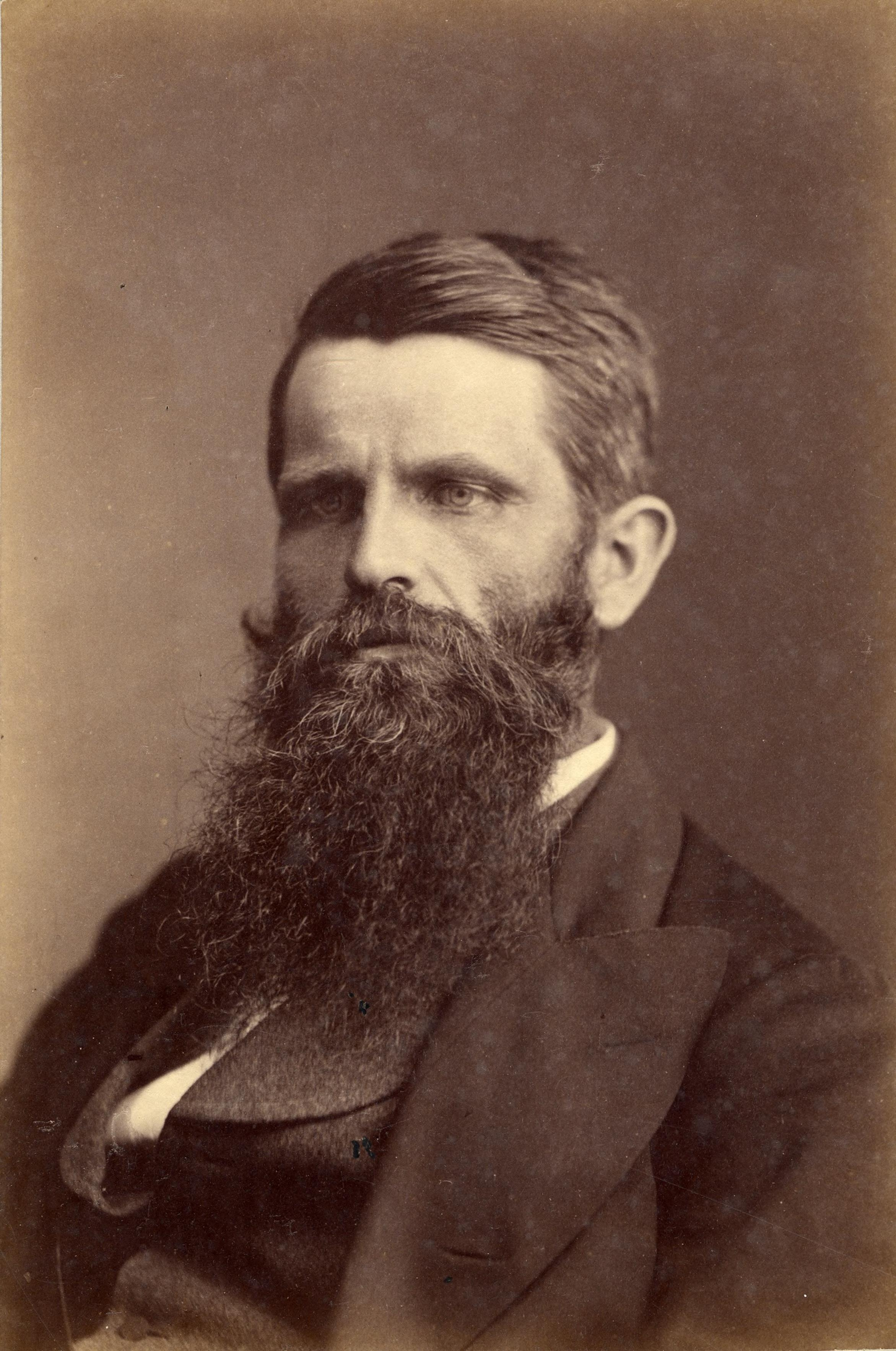
- Professor Joseph Beal Steere
- Born: 9 February 1842; Lenawee County, Michigan
- Died: 7 December 1940 (aged 98); Ypsilanti, Michigan
- Education: University of Michigan
- Scientific career
- Fields: Zoology, Ornithology, Botany

Joseph Beal Steere (9 February 1842 – 7 December 1940) was an American ornithologist.

== Life and career ==
Steere was born in Rollin, Michigan, the son of William Millhouse and Elizabeth Cleghorn (Beal) Steere. He received a B.A. from the University of Michigan in 1868 and a B. of Law in 1870.

Shortly after his graduation he entered upon an extensive tour to make collections for the University Museum. His mother's cousin, Rice A. Beal—owner and publisher of the Ann Arbor Courier—agreed to pay for the expedition if Steere would write letters from his journey to be published in the Courier. He spent about eighteen months on the Amazon River and its tributaries, making collections in zoology, botany, and archaeology. He crossed the Andes and continued his collections in various parts of Peru. He then sailed for China and the island of Formosa (Taiwan). He went on another scientific expedition in 1887 to the Philippines where he made an extensive collection of birds, shells, and other natural objects. From there he continued his journey to the Moluccas, and finally returned home by way of the Suez Canal, London, and Liverpool, after an absence of five years.

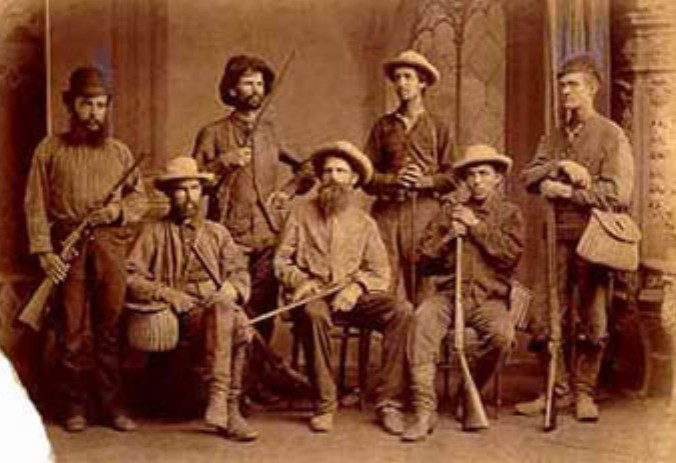
Joseph B. Steere (bottom row center) and his students prior to their 1887 Philippine expedition

In 1875, he received an honorary PhD from the University of Michigan and commenced work as a professor. He held the following positions: Assistant Professor of Paleontology (1876–1877); Assistant Professor of Zoology and Paleontology (1877–1879); Professor of Zoology and Curator of the Museum (1879–1881); and Professor of Zoology (1881–1894). He resigned from the university in 1894 at the request of the Regents possibly because his outspoken stance on temperance had angered the local German community in Ann Arbor.

He married Helen F. Buzzard on 30 September 1879.

He took one final excursion in 1901, leading a group of students to the Amazon to collect specimens for the Smithsonian Institution.

Steere described a number of new birds. He is commemorated in the scientific names of a number of birds, including: Steere's liocichla, Liochicla steerii; the wattled broadbill, Eurylaimus steerii; the black-hooded coucal, Centropus steerii; and the azure-breasted pitta, Pitta steerii.

A species of lizard, Parvoscincus steerei, is named in his honor.

== Publications ==
- Steere, J. B., 1890. "A List of Birds and Mammals Collected by the Steere Expedition to the Philippines, with New Species."
- Steere, J. B., 1903. Narrative of a visit to Indian tribes of the Purus River, Brazil. A. Rept. U. S. natl Mus., Washington, D. C. 1903: 359–393.
- Steere, J. B., 1927. The archeology of the Amazon. Univ. Michigan off. Publs 29 (9, Pt. 2): 20–26.
- Steere, J. B., 1949. Tribos do Purus. Sociologia, São Paulo 11 (2): 64–78, 212–222.
