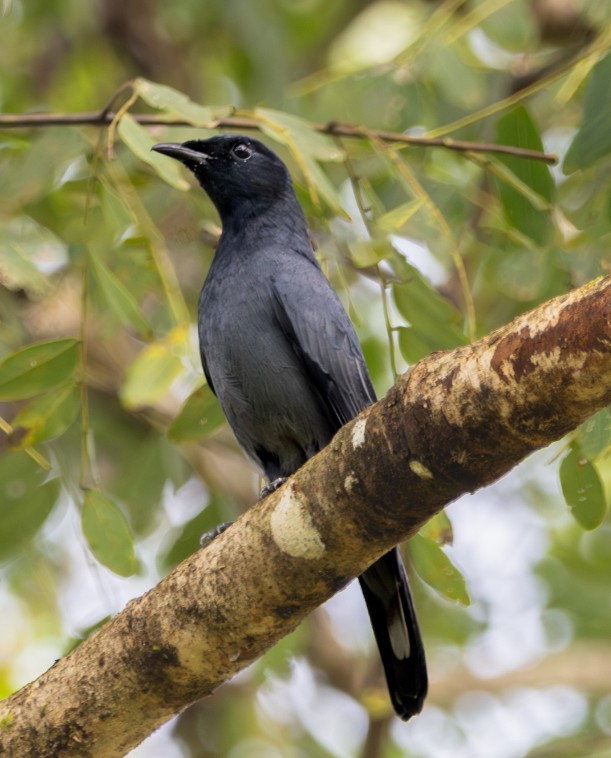
- A male ssp. elusum
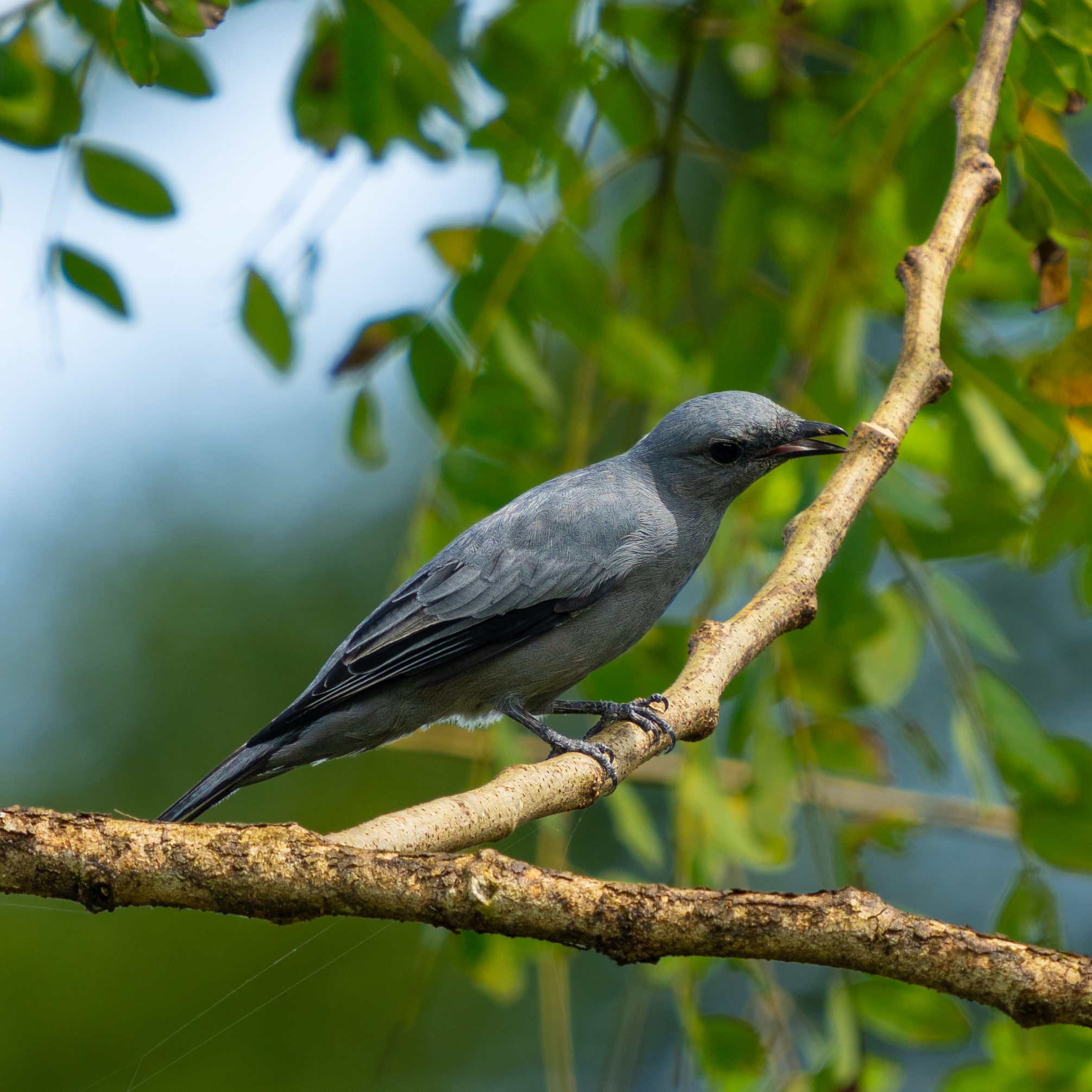
- A female ssp. elusum

Conservation status
- Vulnerable (IUCN 3.1)

Scientific classification
- Kingdom: Animalia
- Phylum: Chordata
- Class: Aves
- Order: Passeriformes
- Family: Campephagidae
- Genus: Edolisoma
- Species: E. mindanense

Binomial name
- Edolisoma mindanense (Tweeddale, 1879)

Synonyms
- Coracina mindanensis

= Black-bibbed cicadabird =

Species of bird

The black-bibbed cicadabird or black-bibbed cuckooshrike (Edolisoma mindanense) is a species of bird in the family Campephagidae. It is endemic to the Philippines. The species is elusive and poorly known. This species has five subspecies that differ considerably in plummage, it is possible that this may actually be a species complex and consists of multiple species.

The black-bibbed cicadabird is thought to be restricted to tropical moist lowland forest. It is threatened by habitat loss.

== Description and taxonomy ==
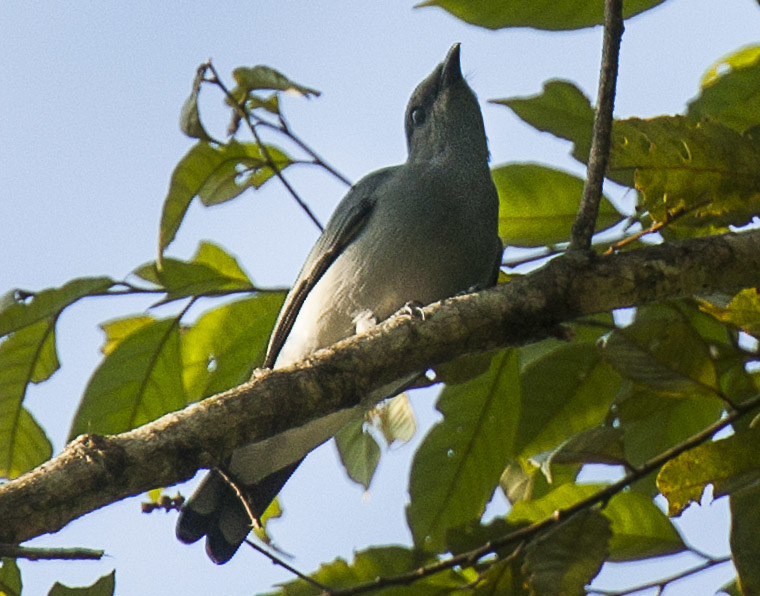
A male ssp. mindanense

This is a medium sized bird found in the lowland and foothill forests of Midnanao and East Visayas.They are sexually dimorphic in which males have the eponymous black bib and overall darker plumage with the females lighter and having "bibs" of either gray or white depending on the subspecies.

Its voice is described as a sharp single note and a downslurred whistle repeated in short intervals.

=== Subspecies ===
Five subspecies are recognized:

- E. m. lecroyae (Parkes, KC, 1971) – Luzon (northern Philippines)
- E. m. elusum McGregor, RC, 1905 – Mindoro (Philippines)
- E. m. ripleyi (Parkes, KC, 1971) – Philippines (Bohol, Samar, Biliran, and Leyte)
- E. m. mindanense (Tweeddale, A, 1879) – southern Philippines (Mindanao and Basilan)
- E. m. everetti Sharpe, RB, 1893 – Sulu Archipelago (Bongao, Jolo, Lapac, and Tawitawi)

Subspecies appear to fall into two plumage sets, mindanense and ripleyi are pale gray on males and pale grey to whitish on belly and rump on the females, Subspecies lecroyae, elusum and everetti are much darker gray in males and slaty gray on females. These considerable differences in plummage may one day lead these birds to be split but will need further study.

== Ecology and behavior ==
Its diet has not yet been recorded but it is presumed to feed on insects. Occurs singly, in small groups or with mixed-species flocks of other medium sized birds like Bar-bellied cuckooshrike, Philippine oriole and Philippine leafbird. It is often inconspicuous and quiet. Typically forages in the canopy.

There is no information about its breeding habits and nesting.

== Habitat and conservation status ==
Its natural habitats at tropical moist lowland primary forest and secondary forest up to 1,000 meters above sea level.

The IUCN Red List has assessed this bird as vulnerable with the population being estimated at 2,500 to 9,999 mature individuals. Extensive lowland deforestation on all islands in its range is the main threat. Most remaining lowland forest that is not afforded protection leaving it vulnerable to both legal and Illegal logging, conversion into farmlands through Slash-and-burn and mining. Its preference for low altitudes suggests that it must have suffered population losses with the loss of lowland forest in the Philippines.

Due to its still unclear taxonomy and numerous subspecies which may be classified as its own species, this species complex may even be more threatened than originally though, the Luzon subspecies lecroyae, East Visayan ripleyi and the Mindoro subspecies elusum are extremely rare while Mindanao nominate is still considered generally uncommon. The Sulu everetti is practically unknown. Due to its preference for the canopy, fairly drab color and similar appearance to other cuckooshrikes and trillers and relative silence, this species may possibly be overlooked.

Occurs in a few protected areas in Northern Sierra Madre Natural Park and Bataan National Park on Luzon, the Siburan Prison Penal Colony Forest Reserve and Mt. Iglit-baco National Park on Mindoro, Pasonanca Natural Park in Mindanao, Rajah Sikatuna Protected Landscape in Bohol and Samar Island Natural Park but actual protection and enforcement from illegal logging and hunting are lax. A large portion, around two-thirds, of EBird records by birdwatchers are in the former PICOP Logging Concession in Bislig which has now faced considerable illegal logging and has no protections against encroachment and land conversion. While there is Observer bias this area still represents an important habitat for this bird.

Conservation actions proposed are further surveys to better understand distribution and population status in remaining habitat. It is also recommended that protection in existing protected areas be improved and other key habitats be formally protected.
